= List of prime ministers of Ukraine =

The prime minister of Ukraine (Ukrainian: Прем'єр-міністр України, Prem'ier-ministr Ukrayiny) is Ukraine's head of government presiding over the Cabinet of Ministers of Ukraine, which is the highest body of the executive branch of the Ukrainian government. Unlike the president of Ukraine, who is directly elected by popular vote every five years, the prime minister is appointed by the president upon ratification of the candidate by the parliament, Verkhovna Rada.

The post of prime minister was originally introduced in the Ukrainian People's Republic, which was initially a parliamentary republic without a head of state, and was later headed by a collective organ, the Directorate. During the Soviet period, the post of head of state was de-facto held by the First Secretary of the Communist Party of Ukraine, making the position of prime minister largely ceremonial. Since Ukraine's independence from the Soviet Union in 1991, there have been 20 prime ministers. The longest-serving prime minister of Ukraine was Denys Shmyhal, who kept that post from 2020 to 2025.

The office is currently held by Serhii Koretskyi after his nomination was approved by the Verkhovna Rada on 14 July 2026.

== List of officeholders ==
=== Ukrainian People's Republic (1917–1918) ===
No.	Portrait	Name (Birth–Death)	Term of office			Political party	Government(s)	Cabinet Composition	Head of state	Ref.
No.	Portrait	Name (Birth–Death)	Took office	Left office	Time in office	Political party	Government(s)	Cabinet Composition	Head of state	Ref.
Head of the General Secretariat
1		Volodymyr Vynnychenko; Володимир Винниченко (1880–1951)	28 June 1917	26 August 1917	59 days	USDP	Vynnychenko I	USDRP • UPSR • Fareynikte • Bund • AKP • UPSF	Mykhailo; Hrushevsky; Михайло; Грушевський (1917–1918)	
–		Dmytro Doroshenko; Дмитро Дорошенко (1882–1951) acting	27 August 1917	31 August 1917	4 days	UPSF	Doroshenko	USDRP • UPSR • Fareynikte • Bund • AKP • UPSF	Mykhailo; Hrushevsky; Михайло; Грушевський (1917–1918)	
(1)		Volodymyr Vynnychenko; Володимир Винниченко (1880–1951)	1 September 1917	22 January 1918	143 days	USDRP	Vynnychenko II	USDRP • UPSF • UPSR • Fareynikte • UPSI • Bund • AKP • NSP	Mykhailo; Hrushevsky; Михайло; Грушевський (1917–1918)	
Chairman of the Council of People's Ministers
1		Volodymyr Vynnychenko; Володимир Винниченко (1880–1951)	22 January 1918	31 January 1918	9 days	USDRP	Vynnychenko II	USDRP • UPSF • UPSR • Fareynikte • UPSI • Bund • AKP • NSP	Mykhailo; Hrushevsky; Михайло; Грушевський (1917–1918)	
2		Vsevolod Holubovych; Всеволод Голубович (1885–1939)	31 January 1918	29 April 1918	88 days	UPSR	Holubovych	UPSR • UPSI • USDRP	Mykhailo; Hrushevsky; Михайло; Грушевський (1917–1918)	

=== Ukrainian State (1918) ===
No.	Portrait	Name (Birth–Death)	Term of office			Political party	Government(s)	Cabinet Composition	Hetman	Ref.
No.	Portrait	Name (Birth–Death)	Took office	Left office	Time in office	Political party	Government(s)	Cabinet Composition	Hetman	Ref.
Chairman of the Council of Ministers
–		Mykola Vasylenko; Микола Василенко (1866–1935) acting	30 April 1918	4 May 1918	4 days	K-D	Vasylenko	Constitutional Democratic Party	Pavlo; Skoropadskyi; Павло; Скоропадський (1918)	
1		Fedir Lyzohub; Федір Лизогуб (1851–1928)	4 May 1918	14 November 1918	194 days	Octobrist	Lyzohub I	Octobrist • K-D • UPSF	Pavlo; Skoropadskyi; Павло; Скоропадський (1918)	
1		Fedir Lyzohub; Федір Лизогуб (1851–1928)	4 May 1918	14 November 1918	194 days	Octobrist	Lyzohub II	Octobrist • K-D • UPSF • UNU	Pavlo; Skoropadskyi; Павло; Скоропадський (1918)	
2		Sergey Gerbel; Сергій Гербель (1856–1936)	14 November 1918	14 December 1918	30 days	Independent	Gerbel	Octobrist • K-D • UPSF	Pavlo; Skoropadskyi; Павло; Скоропадський (1918)	

=== Ukrainian People's Republic (restored; 1918–1921) ===
No.	Portrait	Name (Birth–Death)	Term of office			Political party	Elected	Government(s)	Cabinet Composition	Head of state	Ref.
No.	Portrait	Name (Birth–Death)	Took office	Left office	Time in office	Political party	Elected	Government(s)	Cabinet Composition	Head of state	Ref.
Chairman of the Council of Ministers
1		Volodymyr Chekhivskyi; Володимир Чехівський (1876–1937)	26 December 1918	13 February 1919	49 days	USDRP	1918	Chekhivsky	USDRP • UPSR • UNDO • UPSI • Poale Zion	The; Directorate (collective) (1918–1921)	
2		Serhiy Ostapenko; Сергій Остапенко (1881–1937)	13 February 1919	9 April 1919	55 days	Independent	—	Ostapenko	UPSF • UPSI • UNDO	The; Directorate (collective) (1918–1921)	
3		Borys Martos; Борис Мартос (1879–1977)	9 April 1919	27 August 1919	140 days	USDRP	—	Martos	USDRP • UPSR • URP • Poale Zion	The; Directorate (collective) (1918–1921)	
4		Isaak Mazepa; Ісаак Мазепа (1884–1952)	29 August 1919	6 May 1920	271 days	USDRP	—	Mazepa	USDRP	The; Directorate (collective) (1918–1921)	
5		Viacheslav Prokopovych; В'ячеслав Прокопович (1881–1942)	26 May 1920	18 March 1921	296 days	UPSF	—	Prokopovych	USDRP • UPSF	The; Directorate (collective) (1918–1921)	

=== Ukrainian People's Republic in exile (1920–1992) ===
No.	Portrait	Name (Birth–Death)	Term of office			Political party	Note(s)	Head of state	Ref.
No.	Portrait	Name (Birth–Death)	Took office	Left office	Time in office	Political party	Note(s)	Head of state	Ref.
Prime minister
1		Andriy Livytskyi; Андрій Лівицький (1879–1954)	18 November 1920	24 May 1921	187 days	USDRP	Resided in Paris	Symon; Petliura (as chairman of the Directorate of Ukraine)	
2		Viacheslav Prokopovych; В'ячеслав Прокопович (1881–1942)	24 May 1921	5 August 1921	73 days	Independent	Resided in Paris	Symon; Petliura (as chairman of the Directorate of Ukraine)	
3		Pylyp Pylypchuk; Пилип Пилипчук (1879–1940)	5 August 1921	14 January 1922	162 days	USDRP	Resided in Paris	Symon; Petliura (as chairman of the Directorate of Ukraine)	
4		Andriy Livytskyi; Андрій Лівицький (1879–1954)	14 January 1922	25 May 1926	4 years, 131 days	USDRP	Resided in Paris	Symon; Petliura (as chairman of the Directorate of Ukraine)	
(2)		Viacheslav Prokopovych; В'ячеслав Прокопович(1881–1942)	25 May 1926	October 1939	13 years, 4 months	Independent	Resided in Paris	Andriy; Livytskyi (as chairman of the Directorate of Ukraine)	
5		Oleksander Shulhyn; Олександр Шульгин (1889–1960)	October 1939	May 1940	7 months	Independent	Resided in Paris	Andriy; Livytskyi (as chairman of the Directorate of Ukraine)	
6		Andrii Yakovliv; Андрій Яковлів (1872–1955)	1944	1945	0–1 years	Independent	Resided in Prague	Andriy; Livytskyi (as chairman of the Directorate of Ukraine)	
7		Kost Pankivskiy; Кость Паньківський (1897–1973)	1945	1948	2–3 years	Ukrainian National State Union	Resided in Munich	Andriy; Livytskyi (as chairman of the Directorate of Ukraine)	
8		Isaak Mazepa; Ісаак Мазепа (1884–1952)	19 June 1948	18 March 1952 #	3 years, 273 days	Ukrainian Socialist Party	Resided in Munich	Andriy; Livytskyi (as president of Ukrainian People's Republic in exile	
9		Stepan Baran; Степан Баран (1879–1953)	18 March 1952	4 June 1953 #	1 year, 78 days	UNDO	Resided in Munich	Andriy; Livytskyi (as president of Ukrainian People's Republic in exile	
Vacant (4 June 1953 – 1954)								Andriy; Livytskyi (as president of Ukrainian People's Republic in exile	
10		Spyrydon Dovhal; Спиридон Довгаль (1896–1975)	1954	1954	0 years	Ukrainian Socialist Party	Resided in Munich	Stepan; Vytvytskyi	
11		Symon Sozontiv; Симон Созонтів (1898–1980)	1954	1957	2–3 years	Independent	Resided in Munich	Stepan; Vytvytskyi	
12		Mykola Livytskyi; Микола Лівицький (1907–1989)	1957	22 March 1967	9–10 years	Ukrainian National State Union	Resided in Munich	Stepan; Vytvytskyi	
13		Atanas Figol; Атанас Фіґоль (1908–1993)	22 March 1967	1969	1–2 years	Independent	Resided in Munich	Mykola; Livytskyi	
14		Spyrydon Dovhal; Спиридон Довгаль (1896–1975)	1969	1972	2–3 years	Ukrainian Socialist Party	Resided in Munich	Mykola; Livytskyi	
15		Vasyl Fedoronchuk; Василь Федорончук (1915–1984?)	1972	1974	1–2 years	UNDO	Resided in Munich	Mykola; Livytskyi	
16		Teofil Leontiy; Теофіль Леонтій (?–?)	1974	1980	5–6 years	Independent	Resided in Munich	Mykola; Livytskyi	
17		Jaroslav Rudnyckyj; Ярослав Рудницький (1910–1995)	1980	1989	8–9 years	Independent	Resided in Munich	Mykola; Livytskyi	
18		Ivan Samiylenko; Іван Самійленко (1912–2006)	1989	22 August 1992	2–3 years	Ukrainian National State Union	Resided in Munich; transferred his duties to Vitold Fokin as prime minister of independent Ukraine.	Mykola Plaviuk	

=== Ukrainian Soviet Socialist Republic (1922–1991) ===
Key
Acting/unrecognised government
Resistance government against Reichskommissariat Ukraine (Nazi-occupied Ukraine)

During the Soviet period a head of state in Ukraine (as in any other union republic) was a chair-person of the Central Executive Committee and after 1938 a chair-person of Presidium of the Supreme Soviet (Verkhovna Rada).

No.	Portrait	Name (Birth–Death)	Term of office			Political party	Elected	Government(s)	Central Executive Committee
No.	Portrait	Name (Birth–Death)	Took office	Left office	Time in office	Political party	Elected	Government(s)	Central Executive Committee
Chairman of the Council of People's Commissars
–		Christian Rakovsky; Християн Раковський (1873–1941)	16 January 1919	30 December 1922	3 years, 348 days	KPU	—	Rakovsky I	Grigory; Petrovsky; Григорій; Петровський (1919–1938)
1		Christian Rakovsky; Християн Раковський (1873–1941)	30 December 1922	15 July 1923	197 days	KPU	—	Rakovsky II	Grigory; Petrovsky; Григорій; Петровський (1919–1938)
2		Vlas Chubar; Влас Чубар (1891/1881–1939)	15 July 1923	28 April 1934	10 years, 287 days	KPU	—	Chubar	Grigory; Petrovsky; Григорій; Петровський (1919–1938)
3		Panas Liubchenko; Панас Любченко (1897–1937)	28 April 1934	30 August 1937 ‡‡	3 years, 124 days	KPU	—	Liubchenko	Grigory; Petrovsky; Григорій; Петровський (1919–1938)
4		Mykhailo Bondarenko; Михайло Бондаренко (1903–1938)	31 August 1937	13 October 1937 (Note: Arrested for conspiracy)	43 days	KPU	—	Bondarenko	Grigory; Petrovsky; Григорій; Петровський (1919–1938)
–		Mykola Marchak; Микола Марчак (1904–1938) acting	13 October 1937	21 February 1938	131 days	KPU	—	Bondarenko	Grigory; Petrovsky; Григорій; Петровський (1919–1938)
5		Demyan Korotchenko; Дем’ян Коротченко (1894–1969)	21 February 1938	6 August 1939	1 year, 166 days	KPU	1937	Korotchenko I	Leonid; Korniyets; Леонід; Корнієць (1938–1939)
6		Leonid Korniyets; Леонід Корнієць (1901–1969)	6 August 1939	20 August 1941	4 years, 194 days	KPU	1939	Korniyets	Mykhailo; Hrechukha; Михайло; Гречуха (1939–1954)
6		Leonid Korniyets; Леонід Корнієць (1901–1969)	20 August 1941	16 February 1944	4 years, 194 days	KPU	1939	Korniyets	Mykhailo; Hrechukha; Михайло; Гречуха (1939–1954)
7		Nikita Khrushchev; Микита Хрущов (1894–1971)	16 February 1944	29 August 1944	3 years, 16 days	KPU	—	Khrushchev	Mykhailo; Hrechukha; Михайло; Гречуха (1939–1954)
7		Nikita Khrushchev; Микита Хрущов (1894–1971)	29 August 1944	4 March 1947	3 years, 16 days	KPU	—	Khrushchev	Mykhailo; Hrechukha; Михайло; Гречуха (1939–1954)
Chairman of the Council of Ministers									Mykhailo; Hrechukha; Михайло; Гречуха (1939–1954)
(5)		Demyan Korotchenko; Дем’ян Коротченко (1894–1969)	4 March 1947	15 January 1954	6 years, 317 days	KPU	1947	Korotchenko II	Mykhailo; Hrechukha; Михайло; Гречуха (1939–1954)
(5)		Demyan Korotchenko; Дем’ян Коротченко (1894–1969)	4 March 1947	15 January 1954	6 years, 317 days	KPU	1951	Korotchenko II	Mykhailo; Hrechukha; Михайло; Гречуха (1939–1954)
8		Nikifor Kalchenko; Никифор Кальченко (1906–1989)	15 January 1954	28 February 1961	7 years, 44 days	KPU	—	Kalchenko	Demyan; Korotchenko; Дем’ян; Коротченко (1954–1969)
8		Nikifor Kalchenko; Никифор Кальченко (1906–1989)	15 January 1954	28 February 1961	7 years, 44 days	KPU	1955	Kalchenko	Demyan; Korotchenko; Дем’ян; Коротченко (1954–1969)
8		Nikifor Kalchenko; Никифор Кальченко (1906–1989)	15 January 1954	28 February 1961	7 years, 44 days	KPU	1959	Kalchenko	Demyan; Korotchenko; Дем’ян; Коротченко (1954–1969)
9		Volodymyr Shcherbytsky; Володимир Щербицький (1918–1990)	28 February 1961	28 June 1963	2 years, 120 days	KPU	—	Shcherbytsky I	Demyan; Korotchenko; Дем’ян; Коротченко (1954–1969)
10		Ivan Kazanets; Іван Казанець (1918–2013)	28 June 1963	22 October 1965	2 years, 116 days	KPU	1963	Kazanets	Demyan; Korotchenko; Дем’ян; Коротченко (1954–1969)
(9)		Volodymyr Shcherbytsky; Володимир Щербицький (1918–1990)	22 October 1965	8 June 1972	6 years, 230 days	KPU	—	Shcherbytsky II	Demyan; Korotchenko; Дем’ян; Коротченко (1954–1969)
(9)		Volodymyr Shcherbytsky; Володимир Щербицький (1918–1990)	22 October 1965	8 June 1972	6 years, 230 days	KPU	1967	Shcherbytsky II	Oleksandr; Liashko; Олександр; Ляшко (1969–1972)
(9)		Volodymyr Shcherbytsky; Володимир Щербицький (1918–1990)	22 October 1965	8 June 1972	6 years, 230 days	KPU	1971	Shcherbytsky II	Oleksandr; Liashko; Олександр; Ляшко (1969–1972)
11		Oleksandr Liashko; Олександр Ляшко (1915–2002)	8 June 1972	10 July 1987	15 years, 32 days	KPU	—	Liashko I	Ivan; Hrushetsky; Іван; Грушецький (1972–1976)
11		Oleksandr Liashko; Олександр Ляшко (1915–2002)	8 June 1972	10 July 1987	15 years, 32 days	KPU	1975	Liashko I	Ivan; Hrushetsky; Іван; Грушецький (1972–1976)
11		Oleksandr Liashko; Олександр Ляшко (1915–2002)	8 June 1972	10 July 1987	15 years, 32 days	KPU	1980	Liashko II	Oleksiy; Vatchenko; Олексій; Ватченко (1976–1984)
11		Oleksandr Liashko; Олександр Ляшко (1915–2002)	8 June 1972	10 July 1987	15 years, 32 days	KPU	1985	Liashko II	Valentyna; Shevchenko; Валентина; Шевченко (1984–1990)
12		Vitaliy Masol; Віталій Масол (1928–2018)	10 July 1987	23 October 1990	3 years, 105 days	KPU	—	Masol I	Valentyna; Shevchenko; Валентина; Шевченко (1984–1990)
13		Vitold Fokin; Вітольд Фокін (1932–2025)	23 October 1990	18 April 1991	177 days	KPU	1990	Fokin	Leonid; Kravchuk; Леонід; Кравчук (1990–1991, Chairman of the Supreme Soviet)

=== Ukraine (1991–present) ===
Key
Acting/unrecognised government

The concept of "government coalition" was reverted in 2014 by reestablishment of the 2004 constitutional amendments. Before 2004 and between 2010 and 2014, the government was based on "parliamentary majority".

No.	Portrait	Name (Birth–Death)	Term of office			Political party	Elected	Government(s)	Cabinet Composition	President
No.	Portrait	Name (Birth–Death)	Took office	Left office	Time in office	Political party	Elected	Government(s)	Cabinet Composition	President
Prime Minister
1		Vitold Fokin; Вітольд Фокін (1932–2025)	18 April 1991	2 October 1992	1 year, 167 days	Independent	—	Fokin	Independents	Leonid; Kravchuk; Леонід; Кравчук (1991–1994)
—		Valentyn Symonenko; Валентин Симоненко (born 1940) acting	2 October 1992	13 October 1992	11 days	Independent	—	Symonenko Caretaker	Caretaker government	Leonid; Kravchuk; Леонід; Кравчук (1991–1994)
2		Leonid Kuchma; Леонід Кучма (born 1938)	13 October 1992	22 September 1993	344 days	Independent	—	Kuchma	Independents	Leonid; Kravchuk; Леонід; Кравчук (1991–1994)
—		Yukhym Zvyahilsky; Юхим Звягільський (1933–2021) acting	22 September 1993	16 June 1994	267 days	Independent	—	Zvyahilsky Caretaker	Caretaker government	Leonid; Kravchuk; Леонід; Кравчук (1991–1994)
3		Vitaliy Masol; Віталій Масол (1928–2018)	16 June 1994	1 March 1995	258 days	Independent	1994	Masol II	Independents	Leonid; Kuchma; Леонід; Кучма (1994–2005)
4		Yevhen Marchuk; Євген Марчук (1941–2021)	1 March 1995	28 May 1996	1 year, 88 days	Independent	—	Marchuk	Independents	Leonid; Kuchma; Леонід; Кучма (1994–2005)
5		Pavlo Lazarenko; Павло Лазаренко (born 1953)	28 May 1996	2 July 1997	1 year, 35 days	Independent	—	Lazarenko I	Independents	Leonid; Kuchma; Леонід; Кучма (1994–2005)
5		Pavlo Lazarenko; Павло Лазаренко (born 1953)	28 May 1996	2 July 1997	1 year, 35 days	Independent	—	Lazarenko II	Independents	Leonid; Kuchma; Леонід; Кучма (1994–2005)
—		Vasyl Durdynets; Василь Дурдинець (born 1937) acting	2 July 1997	30 July 1997	28 days	Independent	—	Durdynets Caretaker	Caretaker government	Leonid; Kuchma; Леонід; Кучма (1994–2005)
6		Valeriy Pustovoitenko; Валерій Пустовойтенко (born 1947)	30 July 1997	22 December 1999	2 years, 145 days	People's Democratic Party	1998	Pustovoitenko	NDP • Hromada • PRP	Leonid; Kuchma; Леонід; Кучма (1994–2005)
7		Viktor Yushchenko; Віктор Ющенко (born 1954)	22 December 1999	29 May 2001	1 year, 158 days	People's Democratic Party	—	Yushchenko	NDP • Batkivshchyna • PRP	Leonid; Kuchma; Леонід; Кучма (1994–2005)
8		Anatoliy Kinakh; Анатолій Кінах (born 1954)	29 May 2001	21 November 2002	1 year, 176 days	Party of Industrialists and Entrepreneurs	—	Kinakh	NDP • Batkivshchyna • PR • PPPU • NP • TU	Leonid; Kuchma; Леонід; Кучма (1994–2005)
9		Viktor Yanukovych; Віктор Янукович (born 1950)	21 November 2002	5 January 2005	2 years, 45 days	Party of Regions	2002	Yanukovych I	For United Ukraine! (PR • NDP • PPPU • NP • TU)	Leonid; Kuchma; Леонід; Кучма (1994–2005)
—		Mykola Azarov; Микола Азаров (born 1947) acting	5 January 2005	24 January 2005	19 days	Party of Regions	—	Azarov caretaker	Caretaker government	Leonid; Kuchma; Леонід; Кучма (1994–2005)
10		Yulia Tymoshenko; Юлія Тимошенко (born 1960)	24 January 2005	8 September 2005	227 days	All-Ukrainian Union "Fatherland"	—	Tymoshenko I	Our Ukraine Bloc • Yulia Tymoshenko Bloc • PPPU • SPU	Viktor; Yushchenko; Віктор; Ющенко (2005–2010)
11		Yuriy Yekhanurov; Юрій Єхануров (born 1948)	8 September 2005	4 August 2006	330 days	Our Ukraine	—	Yekhanurov	Our Ukraine Bloc • SPU	Viktor; Yushchenko; Віктор; Ющенко (2005–2010)
12		Viktor Yanukovych; Віктор Янукович (born 1950)	4 August 2006	18 December 2007	1 year, 136 days	Party of Regions	2006	Yanukovych II	Government of National Unity (PR • SPU • KPU • Yulia Tymoshenko Bloc • Our Ukraine Bloc) (Note: The "Yulia Tymoshenko" and "Our Ukraine" Blocs left the government on 6 April 2007.)	Viktor; Yushchenko; Віктор; Ющенко (2005–2010)
13		Yulia Tymoshenko; Юлія Тимошенко (born 1960)	18 December 2007	4 March 2010	2 years, 76 days	All-Ukrainian Union "Fatherland"	2007	Tymoshenko II	Fatherland • Our Ukraine • PRP • Rukh • PPNS	Viktor; Yushchenko; Віктор; Ющенко (2005–2010)
—		Oleksandr Turchynov; Олександр Турчинов (born 1964) acting	4 March 2010	11 March 2010	7 days	All-Ukrainian Union "Fatherland"	—	Turchynov caretaker I	Caretaker government	Viktor; Yanukovych; Віктор; Янукович (2010–2014)
14		Mykola Azarov; Микола Азаров (born 1947)	11 March 2010	28 January 2014	3 years, 323 days	Party of Regions	2012	Azarov I	PR • Lytvyn Bloc • SU • YT • SPU	Viktor; Yanukovych; Віктор; Янукович (2010–2014)
14		Mykola Azarov; Микола Азаров (born 1947)	11 March 2010	28 January 2014	3 years, 323 days	Party of Regions	2012	Azarov II	PR • U-V	Viktor; Yanukovych; Віктор; Янукович (2010–2014)
—		Serhiy Arbuzov; Сергій Арбузов (born 1976) acting	28 January 2014	22 February 2014	25 days	Party of Regions	—	Arbuzov caretaker	Caretaker government	Viktor; Yanukovych; Віктор; Янукович (2010–2014)
—		Oleksandr Turchynov; Олександр Турчинов (born 1964) acting	22 February 2014	27 February 2014	5 days	All-Ukrainian Union "Fatherland"	—	Turchynov caretaker II	Caretaker government	Viktor; Yanukovych; Віктор; Янукович (2010–2014)
15		Arseniy Yatsenyuk; Арсеній Яценюк (born 1974)	27 February 2014	14 April 2016	2 years, 47 days	All-Ukrainian Union "Fatherland" (Feb–Sep 2014)	2014	Yatsenyuk I	Fatherland • Svoboda	Petro; Poroshenko; Петро; Порошенко (2014–2019)
15		Arseniy Yatsenyuk; Арсеній Яценюк (born 1974)	27 February 2014	14 April 2016	2 years, 47 days	People's Front (2014–2016)	2014	Yatsenyuk II	Solidarity • PF • Self Reliance • RP • Fatherland	Petro; Poroshenko; Петро; Порошенко (2014–2019)
16		Volodymyr Groysman; Володимир Гройсман (born 1978)	14 April 2016	29 August 2019	3 years, 137 days	Petro Poroshenko Bloc "Solidarity"	—	Groysman	Solidarity • PF	Petro; Poroshenko; Петро; Порошенко (2014–2019)
16		Volodymyr Groysman; Володимир Гройсман (born 1978)	14 April 2016	29 August 2019	3 years, 137 days	Petro Poroshenko Bloc "Solidarity"	—	Groysman	Solidarity • PF	Volodymyr; Zelenskyy; Володимир; Зеленський (2019–present)
17		Oleksiy Honcharuk; Олексій Гончарук (born 1984)	29 August 2019	4 March 2020	213 days	Servant of the People	2019	Honcharuk	SP	Volodymyr; Zelenskyy; Володимир; Зеленський (2019–present)
18		Denys Shmyhal; Денис Шмигаль (born 1975)	4 March 2020	17 July 2025	5 years, 135 days	Independent	—	Shmyhal	SP • Independents	Volodymyr; Zelenskyy; Володимир; Зеленський (2019–present)
19		Yulia Svyrydenko; Юлія Свириденко (born 1985)	17 July 2025	16 July 2026	364 days	Independent	—	Svyrydenko	SP • Independents	Volodymyr; Zelenskyy; Володимир; Зеленський (2019–present)
20		Serhii Koretskyi; Сергій Корецький (born 1978)	16 July 2026	Incumbent	93 days	Independent	—	Koretskyi	SP • Independents	Volodymyr; Zelenskyy; Володимир; Зеленський (2019–present)

== See also ==
- List of leaders of Ukraine
- President of Ukraine
  - List of presidents of Ukraine
