= Council of People's Ministers =

Cabinet of the Ukrainian People's Republic

The Council of People's Ministers of Ukraine (Ukrainian: Рада Народних Міністрів УНР, romanized: Rada Narodnykh Ministriv UNR) was the main executive institution of the Ukrainian People's Republic. Its duties and functions were outlined in the Chapter V of the Constitution of the Ukrainian People's Republic.

It was reorganized out of the General Secretariat of Ukraine upon the proclamation of the 4th Universal and Independence on January 25, 1918 after the return of the Ukrainian delegation from the preliminary peace talks from Brest-Litovsk. At the preliminary talks in Brest, Ukraine was recognized as an equal-rightful participant and was scheduled to finalized the treaty on February 9, 1918. Until the end of the month January 1918 the member of the former General Secretariat continued to serve as full pledged ministers.

== Scope ==
The composition of the council was determined by agreement among the major parties (coalition) and confirming by the plenum of Central Council of Ukraine. The list of proposed members was petitioned by the chairman of the Central Council, Mykhailo Hrushevsky.

== Initial composition ==
The former members of secretariat continued to serve now as ministers. The major changes was no introduction of the Ministry of Agrarian Affairs and the former secretary of Food Supply Kovalevsky was replaced by Dmytro Koliukh (unaffiliated). Also the Commissioner to the Russian Government was abandoned as well.

| Ministry/Position | Name | Party | Remarks |
|---|---|---|---|
| Secretary | Ivan Mirny | unaffiliated | |
| Internal Affairs (chairman) | Volodymyr Vynnychenko | USDRP | three deputies |
| Finance | Vasyl Mazurenko | USDRP | (acting) |
| Foreign Affairs | Oleksandr Shulhyn | UPSF | |
| Education | Ivan Steshenko | UPSS | Deputy Petro Kholodny (UPSF) |
| Controller | Aleksandr Zolotarev | Jewish Bund | |
| Military Affairs | Mykola Porsh | USDRP | Deputy Oleksandr Zhukovsky (UPSR) |
| Naval Affairs | Dmytro Antonovych | USDRP | |
| Food Supply | Dmytro Koliukh | unaffiliated | |
| Post and Telegraph | Mykyta Shapoval | UPSR | |
| Trade and Industry | Vsevolod Holubovych | UPSR | |
| Justice | Mykhailo Tkachenko | USDRP | |
| Transport | Vadym Yeshchenko | UPSS | |
| Russian Affairs | Dmitriy Odinets | RRNSP | |
| Polish Affairs | Mieczysław Mickiewicz | PDCP | |
| Jewish Affairs | Moishe Zilberfarb | Fareynikte | |

Deputy-Chairman: Ivan Kraskovsky (UPSF), Oleksandr Karpynsk, and L.Abramovych.

The initial coalition was composed Esdeks, SRs, Federalists, and national minorities, however by the end of January a crisis has developed between Esdeks and SRs as the Bolshevik forces of the Soviet Russia were quickly advancing towards Kiev, while the Kiev Bolshevik faction instigated another disorder. Rada issued a note of non-confidence in Vynnechenko's government forcing him to resign on January 30, 1918.

== Cabinet of Holubovych (January 31 - April 29, 1918) ==
A new cabinet was composed mostly out of members of the Socialist-Revolutionary party headed by its leader Vsevolod Holubovych. Along with it a special commission was organized to the Brest-Litovsk negotiations. Holubovych's government existed for about three months. One of the major changes to the cabinet was reappointment of the Minister of Military Affairs, with which Mykola Porsh had a lot of trouble.

| Ministry/Position | Name | Party | February Replacement |
|---|---|---|---|
| Internal Affairs | Pavlo Khrystiuk | UPSR | Mykhailo Tkachenko (USDRP) |
| Finance | Stepan Perepelytsia | unaffiliated | Petro Klymovych (unaffiliated) |
| Foreign Affairs (chairman) | Vsevolod Holubovych | UPSR | Mykola Liubynsky (UPSR) |
| Education | Nykyfor Hryhoriiv | UPSR | Vyacheslav Prokopovych (UPSF) |
| Military Affairs | Ivan Nemolovsky | UPSR | O.Zhukovsky (UPSR) |
| Naval Affairs | Dmytro Antonovych | USDRP | discontinued |
| Food Supply | Mykola Kovalevsky | UPSR | Dmytro Koliukh (unaffiliated) |
| Post and Telegraph | Hryhoriy Sydorenko | unaffiliated | |
| Agrarian Affairs | Arystarkh Ternychenko | unaffiliated | Mykola Kovalevsky (UPSR) |
| Justice | Mykhailo Tkachenko | USDRP | Serhiy Shelukhin (UPSF) |
| Transport | Yevhen Sokovych | unaffiliated | |
| Labor | | | Leonid Mykhailiv (USDRP) |
| Trade and Industry | | | Ivan Feshchenko-Chopivsky (UPSF) |
| Controller | | | Oleksandr Lototsky (UPSF) |
| Secretary | | | Pavlo Khrystiuk (UPSR) |

Right before the coup d'état (April 29) all members of the Ukrainian Party of Socialists-Federalists left the council.

On April 29 the Central Rada finally adopted its Constitution. In it the Council of People's Ministers was defined as the supreme executive power of the republic. The council was to be formed by the president of the National Assembly in consultation with Council of Starshyna and confirmed by the assembly. The members of the Council of People's Ministers were responsible individually and collectively to the National Assembly.

== Council of Ministers (1918) ==
=== Hetmanate ===
On April 29, 1918, what is believed to be as, an anti-socialist coup d'état brought to power a conservative in his political views former Russian General, a well-respected military specialist throughout the region, an elected Hetman of the Free Cossacks Association, Pavlo Skoropadsky. The Congress of the All-Ukrainian Union of Landowners the same day proclaimed him as the Hetman of Ukraine. A well organized coup was supported by the German Armed forces Command that was stationed in the Kiev-city. The historical evaluation of the Skoropadsky's regime that lasted less than year still requires a substantial analysis and a balanced approach. Nonetheless some important milestones in the Ukrainian State Affairs were reached during that period of time.

MANIFESTO TO THE ENTIRE UKRAINIAN NATION

Citizens of Ukraine!

…The rights of a private property as the basis of culture and civilization are to be restored completely, all the directives of the former Ukrainian government as well as the Provisional Russian government are abolished and annulled… On the financial and economic field will be restored the full liberty of trade and will be opened a wide space for the individual entrepreneurship and initiative…

— Hetman of All Ukraine
Otaman of Council of Ministers
29 April 1918, Kiev.

The same day Skoropadsky issued couple edicts: Manifesto to the Entire Ukrainian Nation (author Aleksandr Paltov) and Laws concerning the Provisional State System in Ukraine. Both of those documents became a provisional constitution of the new government. All laws and reforms provided by the Central Rada and the Council of People's Ministers were abolished. All legislative and executive powers were transferred to the hetman who also was recognized as the Commander-in-Chief of the National Armed Forces. The mentioned edicts provided the Council of Ministers with the legislative and executive functions, members of which were appointed by the hetman and solely responsible to him. All decrees and orders of the hetman had to be countersigned by an otaman-minister (prime-minister) or another appropriate minister, while the hetman was to ratify all decision of the council. Civil rights were to be guaranteed within the limits of the law. A supreme court was to be created with the hetman retaining the authority to commute sentences. The name of the country was changed to the Ukrainian State (Ukrainian: Українська Держава).

=== Vasylenko Government (April 30 - May 4, 1918) ===
Initially Mykola Sakhno-Ustymovych was appointed as the acting Prime-Minister, the very next day (April 30) was replaced with another Ukrainian statesman Mykola Vasylenko (Kadet) who went on to a compromise with some socialists composing the government out of moderate Ukrainian parties among which were the Ukrainian Party of Socialist-Federalists (UPSF). However UPSF did not seek to cooperate with the conservative regime of Skoropadsky and was boycotting the sessions of the council. Vasylenko who was acting Otaman-minister could not fully organize the cabinet and performed several ministerial roles as a result of that. In less than a week later his attempt was scratched as well.

| Ministry/Position | Name | Party | Remarks |
|---|---|---|---|
| Internal Affairs | Oleksandr Vyshnevsky | | (acting) |
| Finance | Anton Rzhepetsky | Kadet | |
| Foreign Affairs (chairman) | Mykola Vasylenko | Kadet | also Minister of Confessions |
| Naval Affairs | M.Maksymov | | |
| Food Supply | Yuriy Sokolovsky | | |
| Health Security | Vsevolod Liubynsky | | |
| Justice | Mykhailo Chubynsky | Kadet | |
| Transport | Borys Butenko | | |
| Labor | Yuliy Vagner | | |
| Trade | Sergei Gutnik | Kadet | (real name Izrail Mikhelov) |
| State Secretary | Gizhytskiy | | |

On May 4 the council was replaced with the Government of Lyzohub.

=== First Cabinet of Lyzohub (May 4 - October 25, 1918) ===
On May 4 the Otaman-minister Fedir Lyzohub finally was able to compose a working government. During summer some changes were made to the original cabinet. Lyzohub's government lasted for over half a year and was one of the longest existing governments in the revolutionary period. It resigned with the start of the Ukrainian civil war and replaced by the government of Grebel.

| Ministry/Position | Name | Party | Replacements |
|---|---|---|---|
| Internal Affairs (chairman) | Fedir Lyzohub | Octobrist | Ihor Kistiakovsky |
| Finance | Anton Rzhepetsky | Kadet | |
| Foreign Affairs | Dmytro Doroshenko | UPSF | |
| Education | Mykola Vasylenko | Kadet | |
| Military Affairs | General Rogoza | | |
| Naval Affairs | M.Maksymov | | (temporary acting) |
| Food Supply | Yuriy Sokolovsky | | Sergei Gerbel |
| Confessions | Vasiliy Zenkovskiy | | |
| Agrarian Affairs | Vasiliy Kolokoltsev | | |
| Justice | Mykhailo Chubynsky | Kadet | A.Romanov |
| Transport | Boris Butenko | | |
| Labor | Yuliy Vagner | | |
| Health Security | Vsevolod Liubynsky | | |
| Controller | Yuriy Afanasyev | | |
| Secretary | Ihor Kistiakovsky | | S.Zavadsky |

=== Second Cabinet of Lyzohub (October 25 - November 14, 1918) ===
Pressure from the Ukrainian National Union (UNU) (Battle of Motovilivka) and witnessing that Central Powers were losing ground (Bulgaria armistice Sep.29, Ottoman Empire - Oct.30) forced the Skoropadsky's regime to start negotiations to broaden his base of support. The Union demanded eight ministerial portfolios, the convocation of a diet, end of censorship and restriction on freedom of speech. Although no compromise was found, five members of the Union agreed to join the Council of Ministers on October 25.

| Ministry/Position | Name | Party | Remarks |
|---|---|---|---|
| Internal Affairs | Victor Reinbot | | (temporary) |
| Finance | Anton Rzhepetsky | Kadet | |
| Foreign Affairs | Dmytro Doroshenko | UPSF | |
| Education | Petro Stebnytsky | UNU | (UPSF) |
| Military Affairs | General Rogoza | | |
| Food Supply | Sergei Gerbel | | |
| Confessions | Oleksandr Lototsky | UNU | (UPSF) |
| Agrarian Affairs | Volodymyr Leontovych | UNU | (unaffiliated) |
| Justice | Andriy Vyazlov | UNU | (UPSF) |
| Transport | Boris Butenko | | |
| Labor | Maksym Slavinsky | UNU | (UPSF) |
| Health Security | Vsevolod Liubynsky | | |
| Trade and Industry | Sergei Mering | | |
| Controller | S.Petrov | | |
| Secretary | S.Zavadsky | | |

=== Gerbel's Cabinet (November 14 - December 14, 1918) ===
The final capitulation of the Central Powers on November 11, 1918 and withdrawal of the German-Austrian contingent from the territory of Ukraine forced Skopropadsky dramatically change his policy and on November 14, 1918 he proclaimed a federal union with the forces of non-Bolshevik Russia (Russian Republic). Fedir Lyzohub resigned from the government and the council was reorganized under the former minister of food supply Sergei Gerbel. The federation with Russian triggered a full-scale uprising which turned into a month-long warfare led by the Directorate of Ukraine.

| Ministry/Position | Name | Party | Remarks |
|---|---|---|---|
| Internal Affairs | Ihor Kistiakovsky | | |
| Finance | Anton Rzhepetsky | Kadet | |
| Foreign Affairs | Georgiy Afanasyev | | |
| Education and Arts | Volodymyr Naumenko | UPSF | |
| Military Affairs | D.Shchutsky | | |
| Naval Affairs | Admiral Pokrovsky | | Captain Bilysnky Nov.26 |
| Food Supply | G.Glinka | | |
| Confessions | Mikhail Voronovich | UL | |
| Agrarian Affairs (chairman) | Sergei Gerbel | | |
| Justice | Victor Reinbot | | |
| Transport | V.Laindeberg | | |
| Labor | Volodymyr Kosynsky | | |
| Health Security | Vsevolod Liubynsky | | |
| Trade and Industry | Sergei Mering | | |
| Controller | S.Petrov | | |

On December 14, 1918 the Council of Ministers surrendered its powers and Skoropadsky abdicated. Several ministers were arrested, while Skoropadsky fled to Germany.

== Chekhivsky's Cabinet (December 26, 1918 - February 13, 1919) ==
Between December 15–25 there was a stand off between the Revolutionary Committee in Kiev and the Temporary Council of State Affairs (TRZDS) in Vinnytsia. It took couple of weeks before the new government was formed on December 26. The head of the new cabinet became Volodymyr Chekhivsky. Chekhivsky's government together with the government of Ostapenko altogether lasted for two and a half months. During this period the Ukrainian national forces were almost completely eliminated controlling a miser territory near Rivne–Brody. Both of the governments had also to deal with a series of military revolts against them and were unable to control the situation in the country. They were finally replaced with the Martos-Mazepa government that throughout summer of 1919 were in control of the Podillia territory near Kamyanets.

| Ministry/Position | Name | Party | Remarks |
|---|---|---|---|
| Secretary | I.Snizhko | | Mykhailo Korchynsky (UPSF) |
| Internal Affairs | Oleksandr Mytsiuk | UPSR | |
| Finance | Vasyl Mazurenko | USDRP | |
| Foreign Affairs (chairman) | Volodymyr Chekhivsky | USDRP | |
| Education | Petro Kholodny | UPSF | Ivan Ohiienko (UPSF) |
| Controller | Dmytro Symoniv | UPSS | |
| Defense | General Osetsky | | General Hrekov |
| Naval Affairs | Admiral Bilynsky | | |
| Food Supply | Borys Martos | USDRP | |
| Post and Telegraph | I.Shtefan | UPSR | |
| Trade and Industry | Serhiy Ostapenko | UPSR | |
| Justice | Serhiy Shelukhin | UPSF | |
| Transport | Pylyp Pylypchuk | UNRP | |
| Agrarian Affairs | Mykyta Shapoval | UPSR | |
| Religious Confessions | Ivan Lypa | UPSS | |
| Arts | Dmytro Antonovych | USDRP | |
| Health Security | Borys Matiushenko | USDRP | |
| Labor | Leonid Mykhailiv | USDRP | |
| Press and Propaganda | Osyp Nazaruk | UPSR | |
| Jewish Affairs | Abraham Revutsky | Poale Zion | |

During this time the Ukrainian nationalists were losing their war against Bolshevik Russia and their puppet-state Ukrainian SSR. On February 5, 1919 the Ukrainian government was forced out of Kiev once again and relocated to Vinnytsia. On February 13 a new government, consisting of non-socialist members, was formed in order to convince the representatives of the Entente to provide some military support in the fight with Bolsheviks. The same day Volodymyr Vynnychenko resigned from the Directorate of Ukraine and emigrated abroad.

== Ostapenko's Cabinet (February 13 - April 9, 1919) ==
The head of the new cabinet became Serhiy Ostapenko who quit the Ukrainian Party of Socialist Revolutionaries. Along with him left the SR party Osyp Nazaruk.

| Ministry/Position | Name | Party | Remarks |
|---|---|---|---|
| Secretary | Mykhailo Korchynsky | UPSF | |
| Internal Affairs | H.Chyzhevsky | UNRP | |
| Finance | Mykhailo Kryvetsky | UPSS | |
| Foreign Affairs | Kost Matsiyevych | UPSF | |
| Education | Ivan Ohiienko | UPSF | |
| Controller | Dmytro Symoniv | UPSS | |
| Defense | Oleksandr Shapoval | UPSS | |
| Naval Affairs | Admiral Bilynsky | | |
| National Economy | Ivan Feshchenko-Chopivsky | UPSF | Deputy Premier |
| Justice | Dmytro Markovych | | |
| Transport | Pylyp Pylypchuk | UNRP | |
| Agrarian Affairs | Yevhen Arkhypenko | UNRP | |
| Religious Confessions | Ivan Lypa | UPSS | |
| Health Security | Ovksentsiy Korchak-Chepurkivsky | | |
| Press and Propaganda | Osyp Nazaruk | | |

The unsuccessful dialogue with the representatives of the Entente led to dismissal of the Ostapenko's Cabinet.

== See also ==
- People's Secretariat

== Bibliography ==
- Khrystiuk, P. Zamitky i materiially do istoriï ukraïns’koï revoliutsiï 1917–1920 rr., vol 2 (Notes and materials to the history of the Ukrainian Revolution 1917-1920, vol.2)(Vienna 1921, New York 1969)
- Doroshenko, D. Istoriia Ukraïny 1917–1923 rr., vol 1: Doba Tsentral’noï Rady (History of Ukraine 1917-1923, vol.1: Times of the Central Council) (Uzhhorod 1932, New York 1954)
- Pidhainy, O. The Formation of the Ukrainian Republic (Toronto–New York 1966)
- Zozulia, Ia. (ed). Velyka Ukraïns’ka revoliutsiia: Kalendar istorychnykh podii za liutyi 1917 roku–berezen’ 1918 roku (The Great Ukrainian Revolution: Calendar of historic activities from February 1917 to March 1918) (New York 1967)
- Reshetar Jr, J. The Ukrainian Revolution, 1917–1920: A Study in Nationalism (Princeton 1952, New York 1972)
- Hunczak, T. (ed). The Ukraine, 1917–1921: A Study in Revolution (Cambridge, Mass 1977)
- Verstiuk, V. (ed.) Ukraïns’ka Tsentral’na Rada: dokumenty i materiially v dvokh tomakh (The Ukrainian Central Council: documents and materials in two volumes) (Kiev 1996–7)
- Hunczak, T. The Ukraine, 1917-1921: A Study in Revolution. Cambridge, MA, 1977.
