= Nykyfor Hryhoriiv =

Ukrainian revolutionary, educator, and journalist (1883–1953)

- Никифор (Никифір) Григоріїв

Minister of Education
- In office April 1919 – May 1920
- Chairman: Symon Petliura
- In office 31 January 1918 – February 1918
- Prime Minister: Vsevolod Holubovych
- Preceded by: Ivan Steshenko
- Succeeded by: Viacheslav Prokopovych

Member of the Central Rada
- In office July 1917 – 29 April 1918
- Preceded by: Position established
- Succeeded by: Position abolished
- Constituency: Kyiv Council of Soldiers' Deputies

Personal details
- Born: 21 February 1883 Burty, Russian Empire (now Ukraine)
- Died: 5 August 1953 (aged 70) New York City, New York, United States
- Party: Ukrainian Socialist-Revolutionary Party

Military service
- Allegiance: Russian Empire; Ukrainian People's Republic
- Branch/service: Imperial Russian Army; Ukrainian People's Army
- Years of service: 1915–1917; 1918
- Battles/wars: World War I; Anti-Hetman Uprising

Nykyfor (Note: Also rendered as Nykyfir.) Yakovych Hryhoriiv (Ukrainian: Никифор Якович Григоріїв; 9 February [O.S. 21 February] 1883 – 5 August 1953) was a Ukrainian revolutionary, educator, and journalist who served as Minister of Education on two occasions, firstly for a month in the government of Vsevolod Holubovych before later serving from April 1919 to May 1920 under Symon Petliura. He later served as director of Voice of America's Ukrainian-language service.

== Biography ==
Nykyfor Yakovych Hryhoriiv was born in the village of Burty, in the Kiev Governorate of the Russian Empire into a family of educators. He completed his education in the city of Horodyshche before becoming a librarian in the city of Kiev. In 1904 he became a teacher, illegally teaching classes in Ukrainian in the region of Podolia. A member of the Society of Ukrainian Progressives, he was also head of the regional branch of the Prosvita organisation. He wrote for the Ukrainian periodicals Rada, Beacon, Light, and Podolian News, and served in the Imperial Russian Army from 1915 to 1917.

Following the establishment of the Ukrainian People's Republic Hryhoriiv joined the Ukrainian Socialist-Revolutionary Party and became president of the Kyiv Council of Soldiers' Deputies, representing the council in the Central Rada. As president of the council, he advanced efforts to establish a Ukrainian army for the newly established country. From January to February 1918, he also served as Minister of Education in Vsevolod Holubovych's government.

After the 1918 Ukrainian coup d'état Hryhoriiv went underground, becoming a member of Volodymyr Vynnychenko's Ukrainian National Union. Following the Anti-Hetman Uprising he served as a member of the newly established Labour Congress, and was director of the press service of the Ukrainian People's Army. He served as a member of the USRP's central committee, and opposed the pro-Soviet Borotbist faction. He again served as Minister of Education from April 1919 to May 1920, and in November 1920 fled to Poland. He moved to Czechoslovakia the next year, and in 1922 he co-founded the Ukrainian Husbandry Academy in Poděbrady.

Hryhoriiv's political career continued in exile; he continued to serve as on the USRP's central committee in exile, and in 1932 became head of the party. He continued to profess socialist and left-wing nationalist views, viewing them as intermingled with Ukrainian aspirations for self-determination. He was also active in promoting awareness of social sciences among Ukrainians. Following the occupation of Czechoslovakia by Nazi Germany, Hryhoriiv fled to the United States, where he continued to be active in Ukrainian cultural spheres. In 1949 he became director of Voice of America's Ukrainian-language service, a position he would hold until his death.

Hryhoriiv died in New York City on 5 August 1953. His son, Myroslav, was an artist and graphic designer.
