= Volodymyr Oskilko =

Ukrainian major general (c. 1892–1926)

Volodymyr Panteleimonovych Oskilko
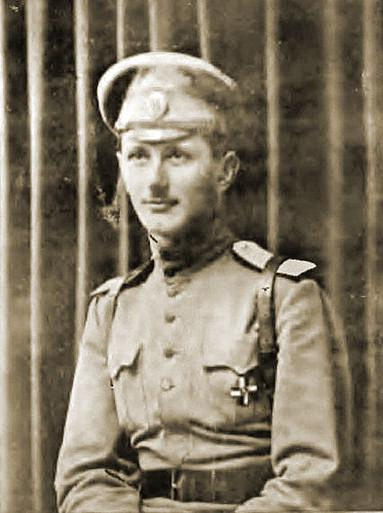
- Volodymyr Oskilko as lieutenant of Tsarist Army
- Born: 1892; Horodok, Volyn Governorate, Russian Empire
- Died: June 19, 1926 (aged 33–34); Horodok, Wołyń Voivodeship, Poland
- Military career
- Allegiance: Russian Empire (1914–1917); Ukrainian People's Republic (1917–1919)
- Branch: Imperial Russian Army; Ukrainian People's Army
- Service years: 1914–1919
- Rank: Major General
- Commands: Chief of security of Korosten Railways (1918); North group of Ukrainian People's Army (1919)
- Conflicts: World War I Ukrainian–Soviet War

Volodymyr Panteleimonovych Oskilko (Ukrainian: Володимир Пантелеймонович Оскілко; 1892 – 19 June 1926) was a Ukrainian military activist and administrator. He became famous for the "Oskilko Affair" (see below).

== Biography ==
Volodymyr Oskilko was born January 12, 1892, in the village of Horodok, Rovensky Uyezd, in the Volhynia Governorate. He graduated from a gymnasium, then from a teacher's seminary. Oskilko started to work as a village teacher in Zolote near Dubrovytsia (today in Rivne Oblast). In 1913 he took part in agitation by the Pochaiv branch of the Union of the Russian People, reading a series of lectures dedicated to the anniversary of the Battle of Berestechko.

When World War I began, Oskilko was drafted into the Imperial Russian Army, where he had a successful career, reaching the rank of lieutenant colonel. After the February Revolution in 1917, he was appointed a governorate commissar of the Russian Provisional Government in Tula. By the end of 1917 he had returned to his native Volyn in Ukraine, where he participated in the formation of the Ukrainian People's Army. At the beginning of 1918, Oskilko was appointed a commissar of the Central Rada in Rivne. He was a member of the Ukrainian Party of Socialist Independists, which was critical of the Central Rada's policies. During the time of the Ukrainian State of hetman Pavlo Skoropadsky, he was appointed a chief of security of the Korosten Railways, an important railway connection in Polissya.

== Oskilko affair ==
In November 1918, Oskilko led an uprising against the hetman in Volyn. In December he was promoted to colonel of the Ukrainian People's Army. In January 1919 he became a General Khorunzhy (Major General) and a commander of the Northern group of the Ukrainian People's Army (around 40,000 soldiers). On January 5, 1919, his unit, which was passing through Berdichev, perpetrated a pogrom, killing 23 Jews. Oskilko participated in extinguishing the Bolshevik-led Polissya Uprising that was directed against the Directorate of Ukraine and preventing the advancement of the Polish army into Volyn. During that time, Rivne became a temporary capital of Ukraine. Due to the strained situation in the region, Oskilko suspected that the Ukrainian government and army had become infiltrated by the Russian Cheka, which sabotaged the front lines of the Ukrainian army. He also did not trust Petlyura, not because of his suspicions, but rather his belief that Petlyura was weak in character and an unreliable person who became influenced by "deserter generals."

On April 12, 1919, a new government, the Council of People's Ministers, was formed, headed by Borys Martos and replacing the Ostapenko cabinet. Martos proclaimed the creation of a republic of worker's Councils (Soviets) and the intention to conclude a peace treaty with Bolshevik Russia. This turn of events had a great impact on the political life of Ukraine. On April 20, 1919, numerous socialist parties of Ukraine (sovereigntists, federalists, and others) entrusted Oskilko to deliver a memorandum to Petlyura demanding the immediate resignation of the Martos government. Oskilko handed over the document to Petlyura in Zdolbuniv, who publicly tore it apart.

At the end of April 1919, Petlyura twice ordered Oskilko to lead his army to the front against the Bolsheviks. These orders were never carried out. Petlyura then fired Oskilko's chief of staff, Vsevolod Agapiev, but Oskilko refused to follow that order as well. On April 28, the Chief Otaman sent him the final order to surrender the command to general Zhelikhovski.

On April 29, 1919, Oskilko led a coup-d'etat in Rivne supported by members of the Ukrainian Party of Socialists-Independentists and the Ukrainian People-Republican Party. The participants of the putsch requested the appointment of Yevhen Petrushevych as the provisional president of Ukraine until the convocation of the Constituent Assembly, the transfer of command to general Omelianovych-Pavlenko, the dismissal of Petlyura and Andriy Makarenko from the organization of military affairs, and the creation of a coalition government from the members of both Ukrainian republics. Oskilko also sent his representative to Poland with the intent to conduct peace talks.

After the failure of his coup, Oskilko fled to Poland, which was at the time in state of war against the Ukrainian People's Republic. After the Poles captured Rivne, he returned to the city and published there a newspaper, which was financed by Polish authorities and promoted co-operation between Poles and Ukrainians. Oskilko reentered politics in late 1922 as an agent of the Polish government in Volhynia, trying to break up a Jewish-Ukrainian coalition in the Polish parliamentary elections of that year. His campaign was criticized for its usage of antisemitic tropes.

Oskilko was assassinated in Rivne in 1926. Polish authorities blamed Soviet agents; no one was arrested and the case was closed for lack of evidence. According to Moshe Gildenman, the assassins were three Jewish residents of Rivne, inspired by the assassination of Petlyura by Sholom Schwartzbard. They were motivated by revenge for Oskilko's involvement in pogroms and his antisemitic campaign.
