= Ukrainian Party of Socialist Independists =

Ukrainian Party of Socialist Independists Українська партія соціалістів-самостійників
- Chairperson: Oleksandr Makarenko (1917-1918); Opanas Andrievsky (1918-1919)
- Secretary: Ivan Andrushchenko
- Founded: December 30, 1917
- Dissolved: 1922
- Preceded by: Ukrainian People's Party
- Succeeded by: Ukrainian People's Party
- Headquarters: Kyiv
- Ideology: Socialism; Ukrainian nationalism
- Political position: Left-wing

Ukrainian Party of Socialist-Independists (Ukrainian: Українська партія соціалістів-самостійників, abbreviated УПСС/UPSS) was a Ukrainian political party created on December 17, 1917, in Kyiv at the Party Congress (December 17–21) and consisted from some member of the Popular Ukrainian Party, socialist-independists, independent socialist-revolutionaries and national-democrats that united around the "Union of Ukrainian Statehood". The party's chairman was elected Oleksandr Makarenko, while the party's central committee consisted of 21 members. As many other Ukrainian parties of 1917 it seceded from the Revolutionary Ukrainian Party. The Ukrainian Party of Socialist-Independists was not numerous and in general did not play a great role in political life.

The Ukrainian Party of Socialist-Independists demanded immediate proclamation of the independence of Ukraine and recognized the social program where land had to belong to agriculturists (peasants), while factories - to workers. The party stood in opposition to the government of the Central Council of Ukraine criticizing it land policy and liberal attitude towards minorities. In the Ukrainian State it also was critical to official policy of the government and belong to the initiators of creation of the Ukrainian National State Union (May 1918), took part in the Ukrainian National Union and had its representative in the Directorate of Ukraine (Opanas Andriyevsky). On August 11, 1918 according to the party's Central Committee statement Opanas Andriyevsky was appointed as a provisional chairman of the party. The party delegated Andriyevsky and S.Makarenko (provisionally) to the Ukrainian National Union.

Members of the Ukrainian Party of Socialist-Independists participated in governments of the Directorate. In a protest to the policy of the Martos government, the party led by Volodymyr Oskilko and along with popular-republicans (Yevhen Arkhypenko) instigated coup-d'etat in Rivne on April 29, 1919.

After the exile of the Ukrainian government, the party was revived in Vienna and later as the Ukrainian People's Party Volodymyr Oskilko tried to reestablish it in Volhynia in 1922 where he published in Rivne the party's press-media "Dzvin" (1923-1925).
