= Alexander Shumsky =

Ukrainian Soviet politician and activist (1890–1946)

- Олександр Шумський
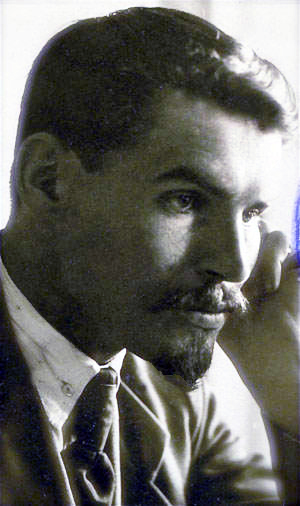
- Shumsky in December of 1920 (photo from Newspaper "Den")

People's Commissar for Education
- In office 10 July 1919 – August 1919
- Prime Minister: Christian Rakovsky
- Preceded by: Mykhailo Panchenko
- Succeeded by: Volodymyr Zatonskyi
- In office 29 September 1924 – February 1927
- Prime Minister: Vlas Chubar
- Preceded by: Volodymyr Zatonskyi
- Succeeded by: Mykola Skrypnyk

Ambassador of Ukraine to Poland
- In office April 1921 – February 1923
- Leader: Feliks Kon (acting); Dmitry Manuilsky
- Preceded by: Mieczysław Łoganowski
- Succeeded by: Grigory Bessedowsky (provisional)

Full member of the 3rd, 4th Politburo
- In office 23 March – 23 November 1920

Full member of the 2nd, 5th, 6th, 7th Orgburo
- In office 15 April – 23 November 1920
- In office 20 June 1923 – 3 March 1927

Full member of the 4th, 5th, 8th, 9th Central Committee
- In office 17 March 1920 – 13 December 1921
- In office 16 May 1924 – 3 March 1927

Candidate member of the 7th Central Committee
- In office 10 April 1923 – 12 May 1924

Director of Agitprop
- In office May – September 1924

Personal details
- Born: Oleksandr Yakovych Shumsky; 2 December 1890 Turchynka, Volhynian Governorate, Russian Empire
- Died: 18 September 1946 (aged 55) near Saratov, Russian SFSR, Soviet Union
- Party: CP(b)U (1920-1933); UKP (b) (1918-1920); UPSR (1914-1918); Spilka (1908-1914)
- Education: Moscow Veterinary School; Shanyavsky Moscow Free University
- Occupation: revolutionary, politician, Communist ideologist

Military service
- Allegiance: Russian Empire (1916-1917); Russian SFSR (1918-1921)
- Branch/service: Imperial Russian Army; Red Army
- Years of service: 1916-1921
- Commands: South Western Front (Russian Empire); 12th Army (RKKA)
- Battles/wars: World War I Russian Civil War

Oleksandr Yakovych Shumskyi (Ukrainian: Олександр Якович Шумський), also known as Alexander Yakovlevich Shumsky (Russian: Александр Яковлевич Шумский; 2 December 1890 – 18 September 1946) was a Ukrainian communist and activist. He was one of the leaders of the national communist movement in Ukraine and actively supported Ukrainization. He was one of the victims of the Stalinist regime, being arrested and killed by the NKVD in 1946. He was rehabilitated in 1958, during the period of De-Stalinization.

== Biography ==
=== Early life and 1905 Revolution ===
Shumsky was born in the village of Turchynka, (Note: Some records indicate that he was born either in Borova Rudnya, Volhynian Governorate or Borova Rudnya, Kiev Governorate.) Volhynian Governorate (today Zhytomyr Oblast) in a family of foresters. The State Archives of Zhytomyr Oblast identify his parents as Yakiv Danylovych and Yeva.

Shumsky himself wrote that he was born in a family of "batrak" (poor farmer-serfs). Yuriy Shapoval indicates that Shumsky was not fully truthful about his origins, possibly due to the practice of characterising oneself in early Soviet history as coming from the lower class. In reality Shumsky's father Yakiv Danylovych, who worked as a forester for the landowner Mikhail Muravyov, had noble origins. Shumsky's grandfather Danylo Yakovych was a second generation priest, who had been assigned to the village of Turchynka in 1862.

He finished school in 1906, either at a village school or a two-year church parish school. After school, he worked at a sawmill and from 1908 as a land surveyor's assistant in the land reclamation commission.

In 1908 he joined the workers' movement and the Ukrainian Social Democratic League ("Spilka"). (Note: political party active during the 1905 Russian Revolution and in association with the Russian Social Democratic Labour Party) In 1909, he participated in a strike at a local sawmill.

In 1911 Shumsky began night school at the Shanyavsky Moscow City People's University, but never finished. During that period he participated in the Ukrainian socialist club in Moscow and later became a member of the Ukrainian Party of Socialist Revolutionaries (UPSR). In 1915 he received the certificate of matura through expedited testing and enrolled in the Moscow veterinary school, but his studies were interrupted by World War I after he was arrested for spreading "revolutionary literature" and sent to serve military duty at the South Western Front.

=== Ukrainian revolution and war with Soviet Russia ===
At the frontlines Shumsky continued his revolutionary activity. After the 1917 February Revolution in Russia, he was elected as a delegate to the soldiers' congress at various levels: corps, army, and front. In April 1917 Shumsky already was in Kyiv, where he became a member of the Kyiv Governorate Land Committee in anticipation of upcoming land reform. At the Third Congress of the UPSR in November 1917 he was coopted to the Central Committee of UPSR as one of leaders of the party's left wing. He entered the Ukrainian Central Council, the Ukrainian parliament, on the party list of the UPSR. In the parliament he advocated left radical views on social and agrarian matters similar to those of the Bolsheviks.

In 1918 Shumsky was elected to the Ukrainian Constituent Assembly from the Volhynian Governorate. He also became one of authors of the law relating to land adopted by the Ukrainian Central Council on 18 January 1918.

On 29 January [O.S. 16 January] 1918 Shumsky was arrested after he, with a group of left Ukrainian SRs and Social-Democrats, attempted a coup d'état to dissolve the parliament, but was freed as Red Russian detachments of Muravyov's troops descended on, and eventually sacked, Kyiv.

At the Fourth Congress of UPSR in May 1918, after his active support, the party's left wing announced liquidation of the party and transferring it underground. Shumsky defended this strategy in order to pursue the struggle against Hetman Pavlo Skoropadskyi, and later the Direktoria, rapprochement with the Bolsheviks, and establishing a Ukrainian state that was Soviet in its form, but nationalist in its composition.

During 1918 he headed the Volhynian Governorate Land Committee, was a member of the UPSR gubernatorial committee, and member of underground revolutionary committee that was preparing an anti-Hetman uprising in Zhytomyr. In the beginning of 1919 after his speech at the Labor Congress of Ukraine, Shumsky was arrested again, sentenced to death, but escaped.

=== Soviet regime and Russian civil war ===
From Spring of 1919 to March 1920 Shumsky was a leader of the Ukrainian Communist Party (Borotbists). His attempt to create a national communist party that would have been associated with the Russian Bolsheviks through the Communist International and become alternative to the Party-Soviet system that was developing failed because of its rejection by the leadership of the RKP(b) and personally by Vladimir Lenin.

Following establishment of the Soviet regime in Ukraine, Shumsky was added to collegium of People's Commissariat of Education of the Ukrainian Socialist Soviet Republic (headed by Hnat Mykhailychenko). Soon in the summer of 1919, after the occupation of Ukraine by the Armed Forces of South Russia, he had taken part in underground struggle against the Russian Whites and was a member of the Galician Bureau of the Central Committee of the Communist Party (of Bolsheviks) of Ukraine. Under pressure from the Bolsheviks, the Ukrainian Communist Party (Borotbists) was dissolved and in March 1920 Shumsky was added to the Central Committee of the Communist Party (of Bolsheviks) of Ukraine as well as its Political and Organizational bureaus, where he headed the department concerned with rural affairs. In March 1920 he also was added to the Russian Communist Party (Bolshevik).

In May – June 1920 Shumsky was a governor of the Poltava region, serving as head of Poltava gubernatorial committee and presidium of Poltava gubernatorial executive committee; in July – August 1920 he was a head of the Odessa gubernatorial revkom. In September 1920 Shumsky was in political administration and the Revolutionary Military Council of the 12th Army. After the defeat of Pyotr Wrangel, Shumsky was a head of the Kiev gubernatorial revkom and a member of the Soviet delegation at the Riga talks with Poland.

From April 1921 through February 1923 he was plenipotentiary representative of the Ukrainian Socialist Soviet Republic to Poland, leaving for Warsaw in October 1921. At that position Shumsky was actively requesting liquidation of Ukrainian emigrant organizations and internment camps for the Ukrainian People's Republic Army detachments. He was let go after separate embassies of Ukraine were replaced with one of the Soviet Union. Soon after being appointed to the position of ambassador, in May 1921 Shumsky also participated in show trials that took place in Kharkiv against the Central Committee of Ukrainian Party of Socialist Revolutionaries where he served as a witness. Since 1922 Shumsky was a member of the Ukrainian Central Executive Committee.

=== Commissar of Education and conflict with Kaganovich ===
Following his return to Kharkiv, then the capital of Ukraine, Shumsky was active in party and trade union work. About that time he also served as a chief editor of a political magazine Chervonyi Shlyakh, or Red Way.

From 29 September 1924 until February 1927 he served as People's Commissar of Education of the Ukrainian Socialist Soviet Republic. In this position he actively implemented reform of the educational system, following the Soviet policy of "Korenizatsiya" that favored recognition of national cultures and languages in educational institutions and state offices, and supported development of Ukrainian culture and literature, particularly writer Mykola Khvylyovy.

Shumsky came into conflict with the General Secretary of the Central Committee of the Communist Party (Bolsheviks) of Ukraine, Lazar Kaganovich, who was appointed back in April 1925, over these issues of Ukrainization. Shumsky sought to replace Kaganovich with Vlas Chubar, who had earlier opposed the appointment of Vyacheslav Molotov as secretary of the Ukrainian communist party.

Joseph Stalin, the General Secretary of the Central Committee of the Russian Communist Party (Bolsheviks), intervened on the side of his ally Kaganovich in a letter to members of Politburo of the Central Committee of the Communist Party (Bolsheviks) of Ukraine accusing Shumsky of spreading anti-Russian sentiments in Ukraine. In May 1926 at a plenum of the Central Committee of the Communist Party (Bolsheviks) of Ukraine, Shumsky was forced to officially recognize his mistake, but it did not save him.

In 1927 he was removed from office after being accused of engaging in disruptive activities in the People's Commissariat of Education of the Ukrainian Socialist Soviet Republic. In February–March 1927 the plenum of the Central Committee of the Communist Party (Bolsheviks) of Ukraine declared Shumsky guilty of "national deviation", which was labeled "Shumkism". Shumsky's removal was hotly debated in the Communist Party of Western Ukraine, which led to its split into "Shumskists" and supporters of the Stalinist position and the eventual dissolution of the party. After that, Shumsky was forced to leave Ukraine.

=== Exile and further persecution ===
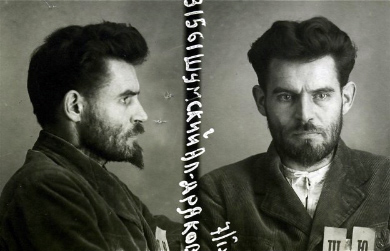
1930s mugshot

From 1927 to 1933 he was a rector of the Leningrad Institute of National Economy, Leningrad Polytechnic Institute, a deputy head of the mass agitation department of the Central Committee of All-Union Communist Party (Bolsheviks), a head of the Central Committee of Trade Union of Education officials, and a Presidium member of the All-Union Central Council of Trade Unions.

Shumsky expected to return to Ukraine, but he continued to be the object of political attacks in Ukraine. In 1930 at the 11th Congress of the CP(b)U the defeat of "Shumskism" was acclaimed, while at the November 1933 party plenum speakers denounced the anti-party Shumsky group and the "counterrevolutionary" essence of its national deviation.

On 13 May 1933 he was arrested on fabricated charges in the 1933 "UVO case" and sentenced to ten years in prison. After spending two years in Solovki prison camp of special assignment, by decision of a Special meeting of the NKVD of the Soviet Union on 10 December 1935 he was sentenced on charges of leadership of a "counterrevolutionary borotbist organization" to ten years exile to Krasnoyarsk.

In 1936, demanding acquittal, Shumsky announced a hunger strike. In October 1937 he was accused in belonging to another nationalist organization of former Borotbists and was arrested in the place of his exile. Only in November 1939 was the case closed due to lack of evidence—but which did not lead to his acquittal.

After the end of his sentence on 13 May 1943, Shumsky was left in Krasnoyarsk because of his ill health. Throughout his time of imprisonment, he did not stop fighting for his public rehabilitation, did not admit to any of allegations, and repeatedly appealed to the Central Committee of the VKP(b). In his letter to Joseph Stalin on 18 October 1945 Shumsky sharply criticized the national policy of the Soviet Union, in particular exaltation of the Russian people as "senior brother".

In the exile he was writing a monograph "Malorosy" (Little Russians), but destroyed it because of the impossibility of publishing it.

=== After release ===
In 1946 Shumsky unsuccessfully tried to end his life in suicide twice. In September 1946, on the way from Saratov to Kyiv, he was killed, allegedly by a special group of the Ministry of State Security of the Soviet Union under the direction of Pavel Sudoplatov and Grigory Mairanovsky, at the hands of the personal orders of Stalin, Khrushchev and Kaganovich.

On 11 September 1958 Shumsky was rehabilitated.

== Notes ==
Government offices
Preceded by Mykhailo Panchenko	People's Commissar of Enlightment; 1919	Succeeded by Volodymyr Zatonskyi
Preceded by Volodymyr Zatonskyi	People's Commissar of Education; 1924 – 1927	Succeeded by Mykola Skrypnyk
Diplomatic posts
Preceded by Mieczysław Łoganowski	Ambassador of Ukraine to Poland; 1921 – 1923	Succeeded by Grigory Bessedowsky as provisional representative
Party political offices
New political party	Leader of Ukrainian Communist Party (Borotbists) (Ukrainian Party of Socialist-Revolutionaries left wing); 1918 – 1920	Party dissolved
