= Tetyana Kardynalovska =

Ukrainian translator, wife of Vsevolod Holubovych

- Born: Kyiv, Russian Empire
- Died: Ann Arbor, Michigan
- Education: higher
- Alma mater: Kyiv Polytechnic Institute
- Occupation: pedagogue
- Known for: being wife of Vsevolod Holubovych
- Notable work: Nevidstupne mynule (Persistent past)
- Spouse(s): Vsevolod Holubovych (1917-1919); Serhiy Pylypenko
- Children: Assya Humesky
- Parent: Mykhailo Kardynalovsky (father)

Tetyana Mykhailivna Kardynalovska (1899, Kyiv – 27 June 1993, Ann Arbor), was a Ukrainian interpreter, pedagogue, and memoir writer.

Kardynalovska was the daughter of the Russian artillery general Mykhailo Hryhorovych Kardynalovsky. She also was the older sister of the Ukrainian architect Yelyzaveta Kardynalovska. Tetyana graduated from one of the Kyiv city high schools and studied at the Engineering Department of the Kyiv Polytechnic Institute, but she did not manage to graduate due to the war with Russia. After completing high school, she married Vsevolod Holubovych, who at that time was a general secretary as well as a deputy to the Russian Constituent Assembly. That marriage, however, did not last for long, and in 1919 the couple petitioned for divorce. For some time Tetyana continued to live in Kamyanets-Podilsky, working for the local editorship of Chervony Shliakh, which was headed by her former husband, Holubovych.

Tetyana later married the former Ukrainian socialist-revolutionary and writer Serhiy Pylypenko, who joined the ranks of the Bolsheviks in 1919 and was a kombrig in the Red Army. Pylypenko, like numerous other Ukrainian nationals, was murdered by the Stalinist regime in March 1934, when he was deemed a counterrevolutionary. After that Tetyana continued to live as a widow of the former enemy of the people in Ukraine until World War II, when she was deported to Austria for labor in 1943. After escaping from a labor camp, she lived in neighboring Italy, and then the UK. After the war she emigrated to the United States because returning home was not an option.

In the United States Kardynalovska worked as an instructor at Harvard University, where she taught Russian at first and later Ukrainian. She wrote a collection of memoirs called Nevidstupne mynule (Persistent Past). Kardynalovska also was one of the authors of the Russian language textbook Modern Russian (1964/65). She died on June 27, 1993, in Ann Arbor, Michigan. A few months later, on September 2, 1993, the newspaper Literaturna Ukraina (Literary Ukraine) published an article about her titled "To the Memory of Tetyana Kardynalovska".

== See also ==
- Victoria Belim, Ukrainian memorialist
