= Fedir Shvets =

Ukrainian geologist, activist, and politician (1882–1940)

- Федір Швець
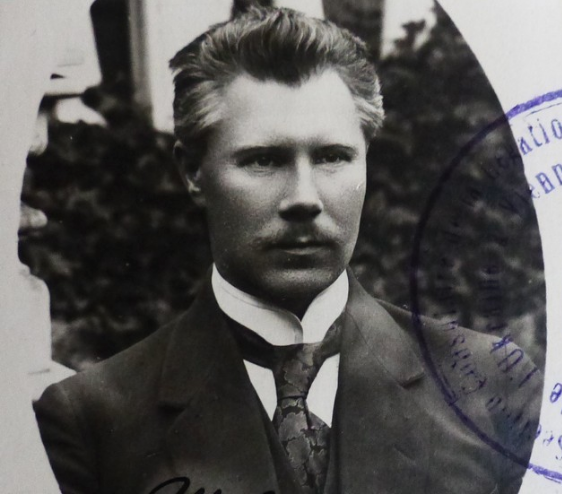
- Shvets in 1920

Member of the Directorate
- In office 13 November 1918 – 21 May 1920
- Chairman: Volodymyr Vynnychenko; Symon Petliura
- Preceded by: Position established
- Succeeded by: None

Personal details
- Born: 11 November 1882 Zhabotyn, Russian Empire (now Ukraine)
- Died: 20 June 1940 (aged 57) Prague, Protectorate of Bohemia and Moravia, Nazi Germany (now Czech Republic)
- Party: Ukrainian Socialist-Revolutionary Party
- Education: University of Tartu
- Occupation: Geologist, public activist, statesman

Fedir Petrovych Shvets (Ukrainian: Фе́дір Петро́вич Швець; 11 November [O.S. 30 October] 1882 – 20 June 1940) was a Ukrainian geologist, public activist, and politician. He served as a member of the Directorate of Ukraine from its establishment in November 1918 until his removal in May 1920, representing the peasantry.

== Biography ==
Shvets was born on 11 November [O.S. 30 October] 1882, 1882, in Zhabotyn, Cherkassky Uyezd. From 1909, after finishing the Natural Studies College of the University of Tartu continued to work as an assistant at the Department of Geology. He actively participated in all the activities that took place in the university, and until 1916, was also teaching at the local gymnasium. In 1915, he was appointed as a docent of the academic department of paleontology and while conducting research in the Crimean peninsula and the Caucasus Mountains.

In March 1917, Shvets returned to Ukraine. At the Congress of a Ukrainian village representatives (6–7 April 1917) he was elected to the Central Committee (CC) of the Peasant Association from the Cherkassky Uyezd and also to the CC of the Ukrainian Socialist-Revolutionary Party (UPSR). In June 1917, at the 1st All-Ukrainian Peasant Congress Shvets was elected to the All-Ukrainian Council of Peasant's Deputies which later joined the Central Rada. During the same time he was working in the 2nd Kiev gymnasium and in the organizational committee for the creation of the Ukrainian People's University. In September 1918, he was appointed as a professor of geology in the Ukrainian State University in Kiev where he became its first pro-rector.

At times of the Ukrainian State Shvets joined the Ukrainian National Union and on 13 November 1918 together with Volodymyr Vynnychenko, Symon Petliura, Opanas Andrievsky, and Andriy Makarenko was elected to the Directorate. On 15 November 1919, with the agreement of both the Directorate and the government of the Ukrainian People's Republic (UNR) together with Makarenko departed abroad with a diplomatic assignment transferring all the power to Petliura. On 25 May 1920 the government of UNR dismissed him from the Directorate.

While in emigration he was teaching in the Ukrainian high-schools in Czechoslovakia where he lived in Prague. From 1923, Shvets was the professor of geology at the Ukrainian Liberal University and in 1924-1929 at the Ukrainian Higher Pedagogical Institute of Drahomanov. He was an author of numerous scientific works in geology. In 1928 and 1929, together with Andriy Makarenko and Opanas Andrievsky they created the Ukrainian National Rada. Shvets died in Prague.

== Sources ==
- Малий словник історії України (Small dictionary of history of Ukraine), editor Valeriy Smoliy. "Lybid", Kyiv; 1997.
