= Directorate of Ukraine =

Governing committee of the Ukrainian People's Republic

- 7th–12th Cabinet of the Ukrainian People’s Republic

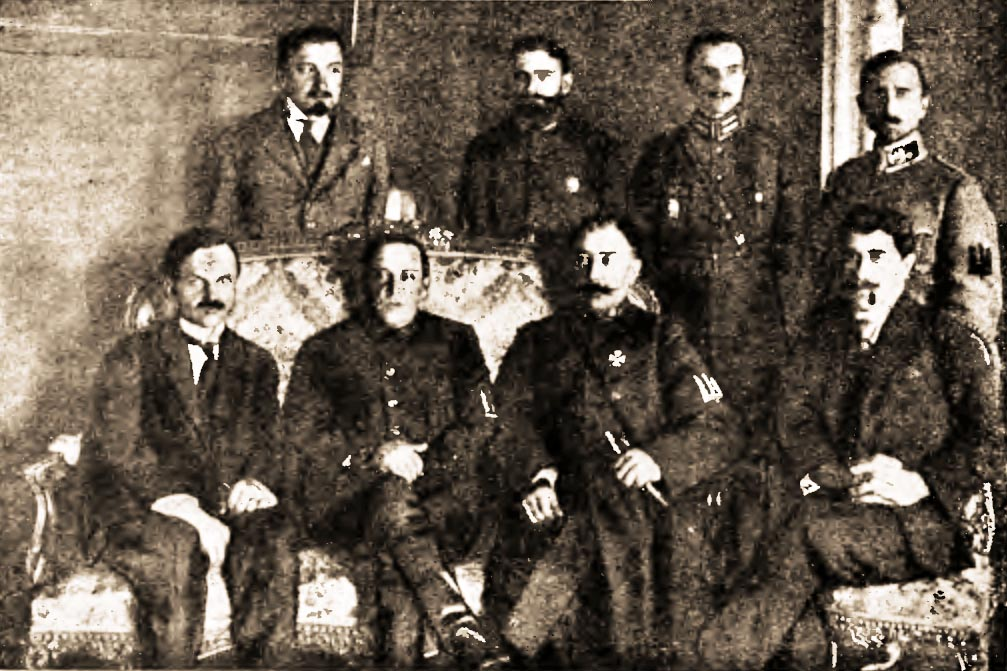
- The government of the Ukrainian People's Republic in 1920. Symon Petliura is sitting in the lower row, second from left
- Date formed: 13 November 1918
- Date dissolved: 10 November 1920

People and organisations
- Head of state: Volodymyr Vynnychenko (until 1919); Symon Petliura (from 1919)
- Head of government: Volodymyr Chekhivskyi; Serhiy Ostapenko; Borys Martos; Isaak Mazepa; Vyacheslav Prokopovych
- Member party: Ukrainian Social Democratic Labour Party; Ukrainian Party of Socialist Independists; Independents; Ukrainian National Democratic Alliance; Ukrainian Democratic Party

History
- Incoming formation: Gerbel Government
- Outgoing formation: State abolished Second Rakovsky Government (Ukrainian Soviet Socialist Republic)
- Predecessor: Sergei Gerbel
- Successor: Christian Rakovsky

The Directorate, or Directory (Ukrainian: Директорія, romanized: Dyrektoriia) was a provisional collegiate revolutionary state committee of the Ukrainian People's Republic, initially formed on 13–14 November 1918 during a session of the Ukrainian National Union in rebellion against the Ukrainian State. (Note: Map) During the Anti-Hetman Uprising, it was named as the Executive Council of the State Affairs. (Note: Ukrainian: Рада Завідуючих Державними Справами, romanized: Rada Zaviduiuchykh Derzhavnymy Spravamy) Its authority was extended by the Labor Congress of Ukraine on 23–28 January 1919.

After unsuccessful attempts to gather members of the committee, it dissolved on 10 November 1920. On 12 November 1920 by the Law on the Temporary Supreme Authority and the Legislative System of the UNR, the executive council was reformed into a single-person government position.

== Overview ==
The Directorate was formed until a new council was to be elected to form the professional government. It was decided not to restore functioning of the Central Rada which was favored by the SR-centrists Mykhailo Hrushevsky and Vsevolod Holubovych. The new council, the Labor Congress, appointed the Directorate as the Extraordinary Government Body in the protection of the republic. It was charged to enact laws in the absence of the Labor Congress due to the political situation in the country, while the Council of the People's Ministers was invested with the executive powers. The Directorate consisted of five delegates from various parties and representation groups.

== Members ==
Vynnychenko left the government (10 February 1919) in the hope that the Directorate would establish friendly talks with representatives of the Entente (Note: Others speculate that Vynnychenko left because of political disagreements with Petliura over state affairs .) while Petliura left the SDPists, thus demonstrating that the Ukrainian government had changed its political agenda and was not the same one that had signed the treaty in Brest-Litovsk on 9 February 1918. In light of that a new Prime Minister was appointed as well, Serhiy Ostapenko, who headed his non-socialist government from 11 February 1919. When talks failed, Ostapenko was replaced by Borys Martos on 9 April 1919.

: Chairman of the Directorate

Name	Party	Term start	Term end
Volodymyr Vynnychenko	Ukrainian Social Democratic Labour Party	14 November 1918	11 February 1919
Symon Petliura	Ukrainian Social Democratic Labour Party (Sich Riflemen delegate)	14 November 1918	10 November 1920
Fedir Shvets	Independent (Peasant Associations delegate) (Note: The Peasant Association had close ties with the Ukrainian Socialist-Revolutionary Party.)	14 November 1918	21 May 1920 (Note: Shvets and Makarenko left the country on state matters on 15 November 1919. When Petliura asked them to return they never responded and were excluded from their duties and obligations. (21 May 1920))
Andrii Makarenko	Independent (Railway workers delegate)	14 November 1918	21 May 1920
Opanas Andrievsky	Independent	14 November 1918	29 April 1919 (Note: Resigned due to the Oskilko Affair)
Yevhen Petrushevych	Ukrainian National Democratic Alliance	22 January 1919	Unknown (Note: Joined the Directorate in accordance with a resolution of the Labor Congress following the unification of the two Ukrainian states (22 January 1919), but he did not actually participate in the Directorate's work and eventually resigned from it.)

=== List of governments ===
Over two years (December 1918 to November 1920) there were five governments before the Directorate went into official exile at the end of 1920. Between 15 December and 25 December 1918 a stand-off took place between the Revolutionary Committee in Kyiv and the provisional Executive Council of State Affairs (TRZDS) in Vinnytsia. It took couple of weeks before the new government was formed on December 26 headed by Volodymyr Chekhivsky as President of the Council of People's Ministers (Prime Minister).

Start	End	Prime Minister
1918-12-26	1919-02-13	Chekhivsky
1919-02-13	1919-04-09	Ostapenko
1919-04-09	1919-08-27	Martos
1919-08-27	1920-05-26	Mazepa
1920-05-26	1920-11-12	Prokopovych

== History ==
In December 1918 Hetman of the Ukrainian State Pavlo Skoropadskyi was deposed after the Directorate was established.

=== Post-Hetmanate recovery ===
With the defeat of the Central Powers in World War I, Skoropadsky could no longer rely on Germany and Austria-Hungary's support. On 13 November 1918 Skoropadky's opponents set up a rival body known as the Directorate, whose forces were headed by the newly reformed Sich Riflemen. Most of Skoropadsky's troops joined with the Directorate during a month-long Ukrainian Civil War. Skoropadsky then turned to some of the Russian officers who were fighting alongside Anton Denikin, forming them into a Special Corps, but these troops were not able to face the Directorate's troops. On 19 December 1918, the Directorate's troops took Kyiv and overthrew Skoropadsky's regime.

The Directorate re-established the Ukrainian People's Republic (UNR). The new regime was torn between the pro-nationalistic, including the party of peasant-democrats, and the factions for the federal union with Russia. At the end the idea to reestablish the Central Rada was set aside as well as to recover all its legal acts yet the most important one were preserved. On 26 December 1918 the Directorate released its declaration to eliminate the Hetman regime.

By the end of 1918 the Directorate began to be dominated by the Ukrainian military leader, Symon Petliura.

Faced by many enemies on all sides the UNR's army was organised to face each threat. To the North-east were the Bolsheviks, to the south-east were the Russian Whites, to the south-west Romanians who had claims on territory in Bukovina and Halychyna, and the French intervention force took Odessa in December 1918 to fill the power vacuum left by the withdrawing Austrians and Germans. Coming quickly to some understanding with the French and the Romanians, the UNR's army was able to employ more men on other fronts.

=== Change of powers 1919-1920 ===
With major fighting breaking out in January 1919, the Ukrainians were pushed back and Kyiv fell in February 1919. The government moved to Vinnytsia on 5 February 1919. A political trick took place that the Directorate tried to play with Volodymyr Vynnychenko resignation to demonstrate a change of powers in the Ukrainian government and maybe attain a possible acceptance with the Entente. Symon Petliura has left the party and replaced the Vynnychenko's position who was too well known. Petliura has assumed the position of the Directorate's chairman on 11 February 1919, a week after the government moved to Podolia. The talks, alas, were proved to be without results. By May 1919, the Directorate's armies had been squeezed into a narrow strip of land around Brody. The Directorate then negotiated with the government of Poland, which was attacking the Ukrainians from behind, with this ceasefire, the Ukrainians were able to counter-attack and re-take Podilia and established a new capital in Kamianets-Podilskyi. In July, the UNR's forces were joined by the Western Ukrainian Republic's forces, who had been pushed out of Galicia by the Poles. During that time (May 1919), Denikin and his White Army launched an offensive against the Reds, during the summer and autumn of that year. The White Guards forces pushed the Reds out of the Central and Eastern Ukraine, thus, giving the Directorate another chance to reclaim Kyiv. But the constant Red Guards counter-attacks and a deadly typhus epidemic caused the Petliura forces to be pushed out of Ukraine completely into the well established territory of Poland. A political crisis took place inside the Directorate members of which were heavily interfered in the affairs of the Council of People's Ministers. Because of that, Shvets and Makarenko were sent on the state matters abroad. Later in May 1920, on the request of Petliura to return, they did not reply and were dismissed.

In 1920, the Polish Army reorganized with the help from the two new Ukrainian divisions to prepare an offensive against the Denikin's forces. A UNR-Polish Treaty in April 1920 provided for combined operations between the two armies under overall Polish command while recognizing the Polish sovereignty over the territory of the former West Ukrainian People's Republic with the border passing along the Zbruch river. In the Soviet-Polish war of 1920, the Poles and Ukrainians advanced side by side, and the UNR was set up again when they re-took Kyiv. But less than a month later, the Soviet's summer counter-offensive left the Poles and Ukrainians retreating, an armistice was signed in late 1920. With this great disappointment, the UNR forces launched an attack on their own against the Reds from Polish territory, however that was quickly beaten. They were forced back into Galicia. In 1921 Poland concluded the border dispute by the Treaty of Riga with the Soviet Union, thus, canceling the Treaty of Warsaw. The Treaty of Riga divided Western Ukraine among Poland, Czechoslovakia and Hungary and gave the Soviet Union control over the rest of (current) Ukraine (which became the Ukrainian SSR).

== Normative Acts ==
At the first stage, the Directorate recovered all of the rights of peasants and workers that were established by the laws passed by the Central Rada:

Until the complete solution of the Land Reform, the Directory of the Ukrainian People's Republic declares that all small peasant's holdings and all worker's holdings to be left for use of their previous owners, while the rest of lands to be transferred to the peasant with little or no land holdings with the priorities to those who joined the Republican forces against the struggle with the former Hetman. The Supreme subordination over the land is carried by the Directory of the Ukrainian People's Republic. This statement concerns also the monastery, church, and government land holdings. For introduction of the Reform there was organized the People's Land Committee...

The Directorate canceled all the codes of the former Hetmanate government concerning workers policies. The eight-hour working day was reestablished as well as the practice of cooperative agreements, the rights on coalition and activist strikes, and various other normative acts.

== See also ==
- General Secretariat of Ukraine
- People's Secretariat
