= Borotbists =

1918–1920 political party in Ukraine

Ukrainian Communist Party (Struggle-ists) Українська комуністична партія (боротьбистів)
- Leader: Alexander Shumsky
- Secretary: Anton Prykhodko
- Founded: May 1918
- Dissolved: March 1920
- Split from: Ukrainian Socialist-Revolutionary Party
- Merged into: Communist Party of Ukraine
- Headquarters: Kyiv
- Newspaper: Borotba
- Membership: 15,000
- Ideology: Communism; National communism; Ukrainian nationalism; Left-wing nationalism
- Political position: Far-left

The Borotbists (Ukrainian: боротьбисти, romanized: Borotbysty, lit. 'Fight-ists') were a left-nationalist political party in Ukraine that existed from 1918 to 1920. It is not to be confused with its Russian affiliated counterparts – the Ukrainian Party of Left Socialist-Revolutionaries (Borbysts) and the Ukrainian Communist Party (Ukapists).

The party's name came from the title of its weekly Borotba (Ukrainian: "Боротьба", romanized: Borot'ba - "Fight") published by Vasyl Ellan-Blakytny. It arose in May 1918 after the split in the Ukrainian Socialist-Revolutionary Party on the basis of supporting the Soviet regime in Ukraine. The Borotbists are often associated with the Russian party of Left Socialist-Revolutionaries who in Ukraine also called themselves borbysts.

In March 1919 it assumed the name Ukrainian Party of Socialist-Revolutionary-Borotbists (Communists) (Ukrainian: Українська партія соціалістів-революціонерів-боротьбістів (комуністів), Ukrayins'ka partiya sotsialistiv-revolyutsioneriv-borot'bistiv (komunistiv)), and in August the same year the name was changed to Ukrainian Communist Party (Borotbists) (Ukrainian: Українська комуністична партія (боротьбистів), romanized: Ukrayinska komunistychna partiya (borotbistiv)). Its leaders, among others, were Vasyl Ellan-Blakytny, Hryhoriy Hrynko, Ivan Maistrenko and Oleksander Shumsky.

The Borotbists twice applied to the Executive Committee of the Communist International to be allowed to affiliate with the Communist International. On 26 February 1920, the Communist International by a special decision called on the Borotbists to dissolve their party and merge with the Communist Party (Bolshevik) of Ukraine, the CP(b)U.

At the Borotbists' conference in the middle of March 1920, a decision was passed to dissolve the party. A decision to admit the Borotbists to membership of the CP(b)U was adopted at the Fourth All-Ukraine Conference of the CP(b)U, which was held in Kharkiv on 17–23 March. After the dissolution, many Borotbists joined the Ukrainian Communist Party (Ukapists), rather than the Bolshevik party which was more closely tied to Moscow.

After 1920 the history of the Borotbists took the form of a struggle between the two trends: the centralist Russophile element, and the 'universal current' of Ukrainian communists.

Ukrainization heralded an unprecedented national renaissance in the 1920s. The Ukrainian communists, including prominent ex-Borotbisty, carried forward Ukrainization, a "weapon of cultural revolution in Ukraine". Ukrainization meant efforts to assert autonomy and counter ascendant Stalinism. Stalinist centralism and its partner Russian nationalism destroyed senses of equality between the republics. The Ukrainian communists and intelligentsia were annihilated. The Borotbist "co-founders of the Ukrainian SSR" were amongst the last remnants of opposition purged under the guise of the destruction of the fake "Borotbist Center" in 1936. They were still being subjected to official attack in 1938.
