= Volodymyr Chekhivskyi =

Ukrainian politician

- Володимир Чехівський
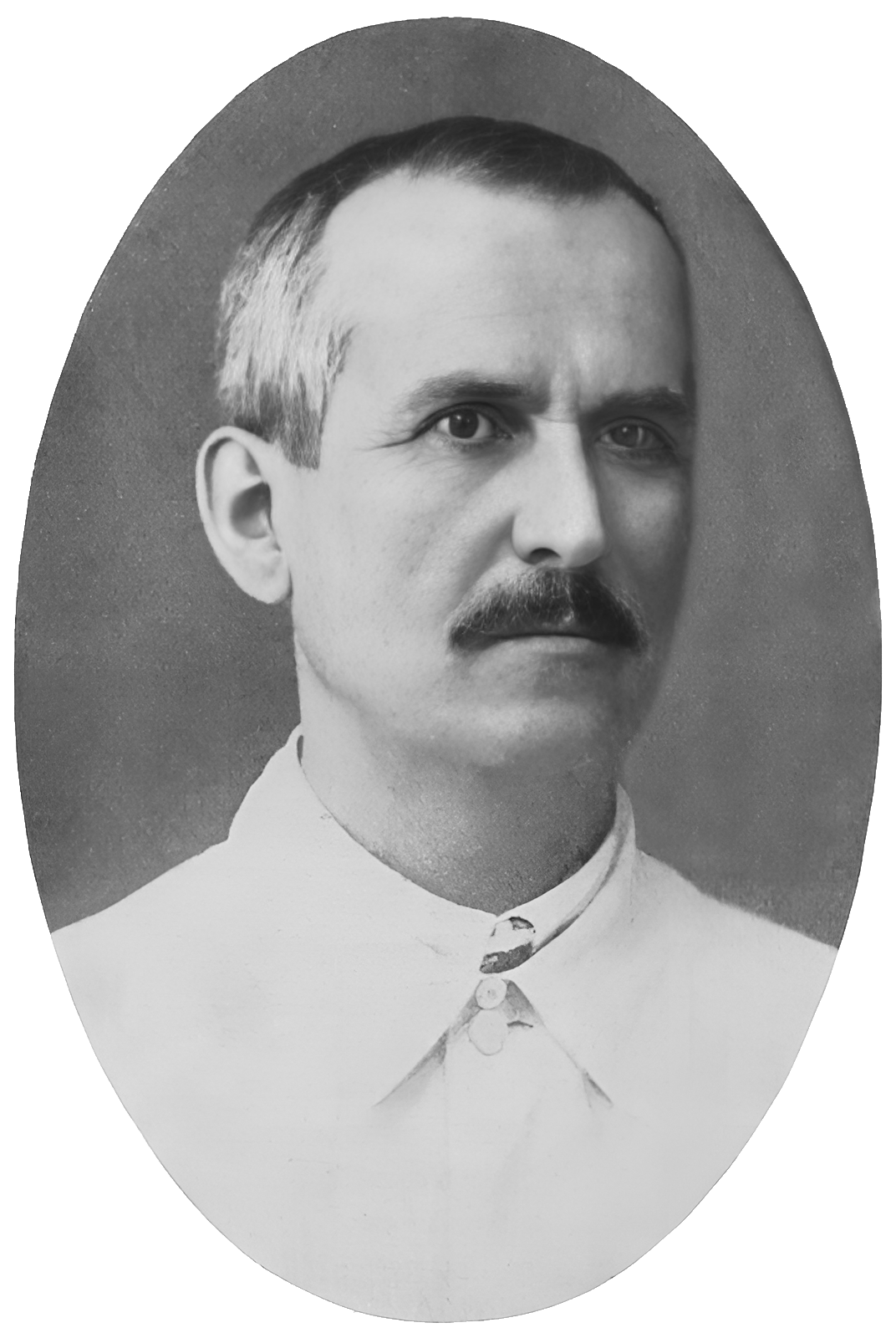
- Chekhivskyi in 1928

Chairman of the Council of People's Ministers
- In office 26 December 1918 – 11 February 1919
- Directorate Chairman: Volodymyr Vynnychenko
- Preceded by: Sergei Gerbel
- Succeeded by: Serhiy Ostapenko

Member of the Russian Constituent Assembly
- In office 18 January 1918 – 19 January 1918
- Constituency: Kherson

Personal details
- Born: 19 July 1876 Horokhuvatka, Russian Empire (now Ukraine)
- Died: 3 November 1937 (aged 61) Sandarmokh, Karelian ASSR, Russian SFSR, Soviet Union (now Republic of Karelia, Russia)
- Party: Revolutionary Ukrainian Party (1902–1904); Ukrainian Social Democratic Labour Party (1904–1919); Ukrainian Communist Party (from 1920)
- Relations: Oleksa Chupryna-Chekhivskyi (brother)
- Education: Kiev Theological Academy

Volodymyr Musiiovych Chekhivskyi (Ukrainian: Володимир Мусійович Чехівський; 19 July 1876 – 3 November 1937) was a Ukrainian activist and politician who served as Chairman of the Council of People's Ministers of the Ukrainian People's Republic from December 1918 to February 1919. Previously, he was a member of the Russian State Duma and Russian Constituent Assembly. Chekhivskyi was also among the founders of the Ukrainian Autocephalous Orthodox Church, and the brother of conductor and singer Oleksa Chupryna-Chekhivskyi.

== Early life and career ==
Chekhivskyi was born on 19 July 1876, to the family of a clergyman in the village of Horokhuvatka, in the Kievsky Uyezd of Kiev Governorate, Russian Empire (today in Obukhiv Raion). In 1900 he graduated from the Kyiv Theological Academy and the Odesa University, from 1905 he was a Doctor of Theology. From 1897 he was a member of the student club of Mykhailo Drahomanov's Socialist-Democrats.

From 1901 to 1905 Cherkhivsky worked as Deputy Inspector of the seminaries of Kyiv and Kamianets-Podilskyi. Because of his activity and interest in Ukrainian nationalism at the seminaries, Chekhivskyi was dismissed and transferred to the Cherkasy Oblast. From 1905 to 1906 he was a teacher of Russian language as well as of the History of Literature and the Theory of Philology at the Cherkassy Theology College.

Between 1902 and 1904 Chekhivskyi was a member of the Revolutionary Ukrainian Party, after which he switched to the Ukrainian Social Democratic Labour Party (USDLP) until 1919. In 1906, he was elected to the Imperial Duma, however the Russian government exiled him, as a Ukrainian to Vologda in Russia. However, through the efforts of his electors to the Imperial Duma, he was returned from exile after one year.

From 1908 to 1917 Chekhivskyi lived in Odesa where he taught in a gymnasium as well as commercial and technical colleges. During that time he was under open police surveillance. Nonetheless, Chekhivskyi participated in the activities of a local Ukrainian Hromada and Prosvita association. Since 1915 he was a member of a masonic lodge "Star of the East" that existed in Odesa and was part of the Great East of Peoples of Russia.

== Revolutionary years ==
After the February Revolution Chekhivskyi became editor of the "Ukrayinske Slovo" newspaper that was published in Odesa. From April 1917 he headed the Odesa committee of the USDLP and the Ukrainian council of Odesa. From May 1917 Cherkhivsky was a district inspector of the Odesa School Council and headed the Odesa branch of All-Ukrainian Teachers Union. From June 1917 he was a deputy (glasny) in the Odesa city duma from the Ukrainian parties, and headed the Kherson Governorate Council of united public organization.

In October–November 1917 Chekhivskyi was a member of the Revolutionary committee (revkom). In November 1917 he became a political commissar of Odesa and an education commissar of the Kherson Governorate. At that time Chekhivskyi was also elected to the Russian Constituent Assembly (from the Ukrainian Social-Democrats of Odesa). In the beginning of 1918 he became a member of Central Committee of the USDLP and from April 1918 — appointed as director of confessions as a minister in government of the Ukrainian People's Republic. Under the administration of Pavlo Skoropadskyi, Chekhivskyi continued to work in the Ministry of Confessions (director of General Affairs department), yet continuing to be a member of the Ukrainian Social Democratic Labour Party. During that time he joined the Ukrainian National Union which was in opposition to the Hetman of Ukraine.

== From Directorate to its opposition ==
Chekhivskyi headed the Ukrainian revkom during the anti-Hetmanate uprising. From 26 December 1918 to 11 February 1919, Chekhivskyi was President of the Council of People's Ministers and the Ministry of Foreign Affairs of the Ukrainian People's Republic. During that time was proclaimed the Unification Act of two Ukraines on 22 January 1919. On 1 January 1919, the government approved laws about the state language of Ukraine (Ukrainian) and about the autocephaly of Ukrainian Orthodox Church that were adopted by the Directorate of Ukraine. On 5 January 1919, the government approved the Land law that was adopted by the Directorate on 8 January.

Chekhivskyi followed leftist political views, advocated compromise with Bolsheviks, opposed the treaty with Entente. On those issues his position was similar to the point of view of Volodymyr Vynnychenko. Chekhivskyi had a little influence on the army of Ukraine. After failing to reach an agreement with Bolsheviks, successful offensive of the Red Army and willingness of the Ukrainian leadership to negotiate with French led to resignation of Chekhivskyi in February 1919. After that was in opposition to the government of Symon Petliura. In spring of 1919 participated in organization of the Labor Congress of Ukraine in Kamianets-Podilskyi.

== Cooperation with the Soviets and arrest ==
After the occupation by the Red Army Chekhivskyi stayed in Ukraine and in 1920 joined the Ukrainian Communist Party. In October 1921 he participated in the 1st All-Ukrainian Church Assembly that confirmed autocephaly of the Ukrainian Autocephalous Orthodox Church (UAOC) and was an adviser to Metropolitan Vasyl Lypkivsky, organized pastoral courses in Kyiv. Chekhivsky was one of the main ideologists of the Ukrainian Church autocephaly and supporter of Christian socialism. In October 1927 he became a chairman of the 2nd All-Ukrainian Assembly of UAOC. During that time Chekhivsky also worked in the All-Ukrainian Academy of Sciences at its history-philology department, was a professor of medical and polytechnic institutes in Kiev, lectured at social-economical courses.

On 29 July 1929, Chekhivskyi was arrested in connection with the Union for the Freedom of Ukraine process and on 19 April 1930, sentenced to death through shooting, changed to 10 years of imprisonment. He was confined to the Khabarovsk and Yaroslavl political prisons, from 1933 – in Solovki prison camp. In 1936 Chekhivskyi was additionally sentenced to three years of imprisonment. On 3 November 1937, he was shot by sentence of the Leningrad Oblast NKVD troika.
