= Ukrainian Communist Party =

Ukrainian Communist Party Українська комуністична партія
- Abbreviation: UKP
- Leader: Mykhailo Tkachenko; Andriy Richytsky
- Founded: 25 January 1920
- Dissolved: 1 March 1925
- Split from: Ukrainian Social Democratic Labour Party
- Merged into: Communist Party of Ukraine
- Newspaper: Chervoniy Prapor
- Membership (1920): 3,000
- Ideology: National communism Marxism; Revolutionary socialism Ukrainian nationalism Left-wing nationalism
- Political position: Left-wing to far-left
- Anthem: The Internationale

The Ukrainian Communist Party (Ukrainian: Українська комуністична партія, romanized: Ukrainska komunistychna partiia) was an oppositional political party in Soviet Ukraine, from 1920 until 1925. Its followers were known as Ukapists (укапісти, ukapisty), from the initials UKP.

== History ==
=== USDLP independents ===
The UKP was an offshoot party of the Ukrainian Social Democratic Labour Party (SD's) created in by former members of the Social-Democrats, who in January 1919 had organized as the group of the independent Social-Democrats, USDLP independents. It opposed Russian domination within the future envisaged Socialist order as well as Russian domination of Republics formed within the territory of the former Russian empire. It condemned the Communist Party (Bolsheviks) of Ukraine (CP(b)U), criticizing it in its newspaper, Chervonyy Prapor for being subject to the Russian Bolshevik party in Moscow.

Following the capture of Kyiv by the Bolsheviks, "independents" refused to leave the capital and agreed to enter the Ukrainian Soviet government on the conditions, that Ukrainian SSR would be recognized as an independent state, and Ukrainian as its official language. After getting a refusal, they entered the opposition to new authorities together with SR and remaining SD's. The coalition proclaimed as its goal the creation of free local councils representing the working classes.

In May 1919 a delegation consisting of four SR members and one representative of the "independents" arrived to Ternopil, where the Ukrainian People's Republic government was based at the time. As a result of negotiations, three SR members were included into the Council of People's Ministers. Left without government positions, "independents" then turned to the idea of organizing an anti-Bolshevik uprising in Ukraine, allying themselves with the forces of Otaman Zelenyi. Their activities benefitted from the Hryhoriv Uprising, which forced the Bolsheviks to withdraw much of their forces southwards.

Initially based in the area of Trypillia, the headquarters of insurgents moved to the outskirts of Stavyshche. There in June 1919 they established contact with troops of Yuriy Tyutyunnyk, and later in the month led a joint offensive on Volodarka and Skvyra. After being forced to retreat by the Bolsheviks, in July representatives of the insurgents arrived to Kamianets-Podilskyi, where they were arrested by forces of Symon Petliura on suspicion of being Bolshevik agents. Released after more than a month of arrest, "independents" declared their refusal to oppose the Bolsheviks and started negotiations with Christian Rakovsky's government. In late 1919 Bolshevik authorities agreed to legalize their party and allowed the publication of the party newspaper in Kyiv.

=== Communists ===
In January 1920 "independents" formally dissolved their organization and reformed as the Ukrainian Communist Party ("Ukapists"). The initial membership of several hundred was made up of Ukrainian Social-Democrat Sovereigntists, former Ukrainian left-SRs, Borotbists, and "federalists" from the CP(b)U, like Yuriy Lapchynsky. The Ukapists stood for a Soviet Ukraine with its own communist party separate from the Bolsheviks (renamed in March 1918 Russian Communist Party). In 1923 a faction within the UKP sponsored by the secret police (Cheka) requested unification with the CPU. On August 27, 1920, then again in 1924, the UKP sent the Comintern a letter requesting recognition of the independence of the Ukrainian SSR and the right of Ukrainians to have their own party in the Comintern. The Comintern, de facto run by the Russian Bolsheviks, answered that the Ukrainian republic as a sovereign state within the USSR was already represented and that therefore UKP should dissolve and unite with CP(b)U. Recent research has shown that on the eve of their dissolution their influence was rising in Kyiv and Katerynoslav provinces.

As a legal party, UKP initially took part in elections to local councils and trade union organs. However, in late 1920 its political activities and publications were banned by Soviet authorities, and many of its members were repratedly arrested by the Cheka and OGPU. On 1 March 1925, at its 4th congress the UKP formally abolished itself. Some members, including its leader Andryi Richytsky, joined the Bolshevik CP(b)U in order to have some influence on Ukrainian politics. Former Ukapists were purged in 1931–34, and then executed or exiled to Siberia.

== See also ==
- Communist Party of Ukraine, the reanimated Communist Party (Bolsheviks) of Ukraine that was recreated in 1993 after the ban on Communists parties was lifted.
- Communist Party (Bolsheviks) of Ukraine, formally constituted in Moscow March 1918 as a sub-unit of the Russian Communist Party. It was banned in 1992 and later re-established.
