= Victoria Belim =

Ukrainian memoirist

Victoria Belim Frolova
- Вікторія Белім
- Born: 1978 (age 47–48)
- Occupation: Memoirist

Victoria Belim (Note: Ukrainian: Вікторія Белім, romanized: Viktoriia Belim), also known as Victoria Belim Frolova (born 1978) is a journalist, perfumery expert, translator, and Ukrainian memoirist who is notable for her 2023 book, The Rooster House.

== Life ==
Belim describes herself as half-Ukrainian, half-Russian, and was raised in Ukraine until she reached the age of 15, when her family moved to the United States in Chicago. After moving to Brussels in 2013, she decided to return to Ukraine in 2014. Her work appeared in the Financial Times.

== Works ==
- Belim, Victoria (2023-06-27). The Rooster House. New York: Abrams Press. ISBN 978-1-4197-6785-2.
