= Oleksandr Shapoval =

Ukrainian ballet dancer and choreographer (1975–2022)

Oleksandr Shapoval (Ukrainian: Олександр Миколайович Шаповал; 9 February 1975 – 12 September 2022) was a Ukrainian ballet dancer and choreographer with the National Opera of Ukraine. He volunteered to serve in the Ukrainian military after the 2022 Russian invasion of Ukraine, and was killed in battle near Mayorsk, Donetsk Oblast, on 12 September 2022, aged 47.

He was an Honoured Artist of Ukraine.
