= Ukrainian People's Party (disambiguation) =

Ukrainian People's Party (Ukrainian: Українська народна партія) has several editions:

- Ukrainian People's Party (1902) was a nationalist party of Mykola Mikhnovsky that was liquidated in 1907.
- Ukrainian People's Party (2002) is a modern political party of national-democratic direction of Yuri Kostenko.
