= Serhiy Ostapenko =

Ukrainian economist, statesman, and activist (1881–1937)

- Сергій Остапенко
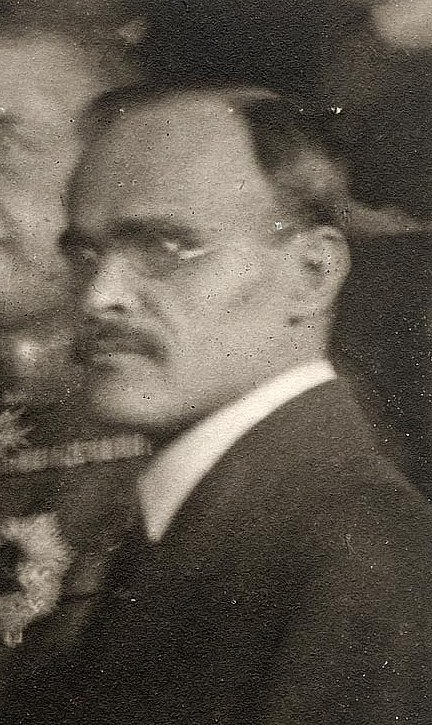
- Ostapenko in 1918

4th Chairman of People's Ministers
- In office 13 February 1919 – 9 April 1919
- President: Directorate
- Preceded by: Volodymyr Chekhivsky
- Succeeded by: Borys Martos

Minister of Trade and Industry
- In office 26 December 1918 – 13 February 1919
- Prime Minister: Volodymyr Chekhivsky
- Preceded by: Sergei Mering
- Succeeded by: Office disestablished

Minister of Agitation and Propaganda
- In office 6 February 1919 – 9 April 1919
- Prime Minister: Volodymyr Chekhivsky
- Preceded by: O. Nazaruk
- Succeeded by: T. Cherkasky

Personal details
- Born: 18 November 1881 Troianiv, Russian Empire (now Ukraine)
- Died: 1937 (aged 55–56)
- Party: UPSR (1905-1919)
- Education: Kyiv Commercial Institute (1913)

Serhiy Stepanovych Ostapenko (Ukrainian: Сергій Степанович Остапенко; 18 November [O.S. 6 November] 1881 – 1937) was a Ukrainian economist, statesman, and political activist. In early 1919 he served as Chairman of the Council of People's Ministers of Ukrainian People's Republic, a position equivalent to the present-day office of Prime Minister of Ukraine.

== Early years ==
Ostapenko was born in November 1881 in the village of Troianiv, near Zhytomyr. Ostapenko was born into a family of poor peasants and his father had another job as a freight transporter. From 1893 to 1897, Ostapenko attended the local elementary school, after which, he enrolled into an agrarian middle school in Bilokrynytsia of Kremenets uyezd.

In 1904, he started working as a teacher in a two-grade school of Turiysk of Kovel uyezd. In 1905, Ostapenko was arrested for being a member of the Ukrainian Socialist-Revolutionary Party. He spent the next three years in jail for "political reasons", as he claimed. After his release, Ostapenko had some trouble of finding employment. He graduated from the Vladimir Cadet Corps after final tests in 1909 and the same year enrolled into the Economic school of Kyiv Commercial Institute (now Kyiv National Economic University). Upon his graduation in 1913 he was sent to Germany for extended studies in Economics.

In 1913 he returned to Ukraine where he found the job as head of the Bureau of Statistics in Balta uyezd of Podolia Governorate. In 1914 Ostapenko was transferred to Kharkiv where he headed the Bureau of Statistics for the Mining Industry of Sloboda Ukraine. Later he returned to Kyiv where he worked as a private-docent in the Kyiv Commercial Institute until 1917.

== The revolution ==
In January 1918, Ostapenko was appointed as an economic adviser to the Ukrainian economic commission of Vsevolod Holubovych for the negotiations in Brest-Litovsk (see Treaty of Brest-Litovsk (Ukraine–Central Powers). On 14 March 1918 he worked to the trade commission of Mykola Porsh for the goods exchange with the Central Powers and responsible to the Council of People's Ministers.

During the times of the Ukrainian State Ostapenko was included to the Serhiy Shelukhin's economic commission of the Ukrainian peace delegation during the negotiations with the delegation of the Soviet Russia in Kyiv. These negotiations took place from 23 May through 7 October 1918. Concurrently, he lectured in political economy, economical geography, and others for various schools in Kyiv.

== Political career ==
After the Directorate of Ukraine forced Pavlo Skoropadskyi to emigrate, Ostapenko, being a member of the Ukrainian SR party and was appointed to the socialist government of Volodymyr Chekhivsky as the minister of trade and industry. In February 1919 when the government of Ukraine had to relocate out of Kyiv to Vinnytsia with the advancing Bolshevik forces, Ostapenko discontinued his membership with the Ukrainian SRs. After the resignation of several ministers from the government he was performing the duties of the minister of political agitation and propaganda. On February 6, 1919 he participated as the representative of the Ukrainian government in the negotiations with the Chief of staff of the French military forces of Colonel Freidenberg (see Entente intervention) at the railroad station of Birzula, near Odesa. The Ukrainians were requesting from the representatives of the Entente recognition of the sovereignty of Ukraine, allowing it to participate at the Paris Peace Conference, and several other important factors. After the negotiations brought no results the government of Chekhivsky resigned.

The Directorate of Ukraine requested Ostapenko who was appointed to find the understanding (?) with the members of the Entente to form another government. His government was composed mostly out of more liberal-democratic representatives, but as the government did not bring any real results in the short period of time in couple of months it was replaced by the government of more socially oriented Borys Martos. Ostapenko found no place in the new government was found and he moved for couple of months to Galicia.

== Professor's career ==
After some successes at the Bolshevik front and the liberation of Podolia, he moved to Kamianets-Podilskyi that since June 1919 served as the temporary administrative center of the Ukrainian People's Republic until the end of 1919. Still unable to find a job, Ostapenko applied to the Kamyanets-Podilsky State University that was hiring numerous professors and private-docents in various fields.

On 18 July 1919 the minister of education Anton Krushelnytsky accepted his application by the reference of the University's first rector Ilarion Ohienko. Ostapenko became a private-docent at the Department of Statistics of the University's Jurisprudential School and started his work in October 1919. On 5 November 1919 the council of the University's professors asked him to lecture the political economy beside his classes of statistics. On 25 February 1920 Ostapenko was confirmed as the permanent docent of the Department of Political Economy and Statistics. In May 1920 the governorate administration published his books The course of statistics and demographics of 3,500 releases and The important characteristics of the Ukrainian ethnicity in comparison to other ethnics of 1,500.

== Life in Soviet Ukraine ==
By the end of 1920 Ostapenko relocated to Kyiv. In May 1921 the Supreme Extraordinary Tribunal began the hearing of the affair of Ukrainian SRs on which Ostapenko was invited as a witness. However, by the proposition of Dmitry Manuilsky he was placed amongst the ones under trail. Ostapenko plead not guilty and was given five years of correctional labor camps. Later unexpectedly the sentence was changed and he was forced to work by specialty instead of katorga, due to his value as a scientific force. Further his fate is not known. There are speculations that 1931 he was arrested by the NKVD and perished in the labor camps (according to the Encyclopedia of Ukraine) sometime in 1937.
