= Borys Martos =

Ukrainian politician and economist

- Борис Мартос
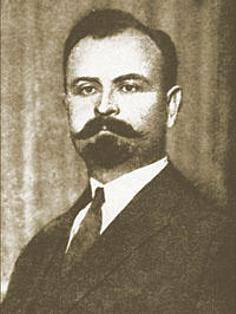

5th Chairman of People's Ministers of Ukraine
- In office 9 April 1919 – 27 August 1919
- President: Directorate
- Preceded by: Serhiy Ostapenko
- Succeeded by: Isaak Mazepa

Minister of Food Provisions
- In office 26 December 1918 – 13 February 1919
- Prime Minister: Volodymyr Chekhivsky
- Preceded by: G. Glinka (Ukrainian State)
- Succeeded by: I. Feschenko-Chopivsky (as Minister of Economy)

Secretary of Agrarian Affairs
- In office 28 June 1917 – 14 August 1917
- Prime Minister: Volodymyr Vynnychenko
- Preceded by: Position established
- Succeeded by: M. Savchenko-Bilsky

Personal details
- Born: 20 May 1879 Gradizhsk, Kremenchugsky Uyezd, Poltava Governorate, Russian Empire (now Hradyzk, Kremenchuk Raion, Poltava Oblast, Ukraine)
- Died: 19 September 1977 (aged 98) Bound Brook, New Jersey, United States
- Party: USDRP (1905)
- Spouse: M. Kucheryavenko
- Education: Imperial Kharkov University (1908)
- Occupation: Politician/Activist/Pedagogue

Borys Mykolayovych Martos (Ukrainian: Борис Миколайович Мартос; 20 May 1879 – 19 September 1977) was a Ukrainian politician, pedagogue, and economist who briefly served as Chairman of People's Ministers of the Ukrainian People's Republic from April to August 1919.

== Biography ==
Martos was born in Gradizhsk, in the Poltava Governorate of the Russian Empire, into a noble family of the Ossorya coat of arms.

Martos graduated from Lubny Classic gymnasium in 1897 and enrolled into the Mathematics Department of the Imperial Kharkov University. There Martos became a member of a secret Ukrainian student hromada of Kharkov. Here in 1900 he met with Symon Petliura and his future wife M. Kucheryavenko. In the summer of 1900 Martos participated in the First Ukrainian Student Congress in Halychyna.

He was arrested three times for collaboration with the Revolutionary Ukrainian Party. After graduating and until 1917 Martos worked in several different places: a co-ed in Volhynia, a financial director at the Black Sea-Kuban Railway board, a director of the Kuban Cooperative Bank, and a cooperative instructor for the Poltava Governorate zemstvo (1913–1917). In 1917 Martos served on numerous official positions as delegate in the Central Rada and its Executive Committee (Mala Rada), and the General Secretariat. After the Hetman coup-d'etat worked as a cooperator. During that time Martos was heading the Central Ukrainian Cooperative Committee as its executive director as well working at the board of directors for the Dniprosoyuz, giving lectures at the Kyiv Commercial Institute, and had established the Kyiv Cooperative Institute.

Under the Directorate of Ukraine, he served as the chairman of the Council of People's Ministers of the Ukrainian People's Republic from 9 April to 27 August 1919. In 1917-1918 Martos was a member of the Central Rada and the Secretary of Agrarian Affairs. In 1918 he also was heading the All-Ukrainian Cooperative Committee.

In 1920 Martos emigrated to Czechoslovakia, where he used to teach in the Ukrainian management Academy in Prague. He died on 19 September 1977, and is buried in New Jersey, United States.

Records
Preceded by Federico Páez	Oldest living state leader 9 February 1974 – 22 March 1978	Succeeded by Isidro Ayora
