= Vsevolod Holubovych =

Prime minister of the Ukrainian People's Republic

- Всеволод Голубович
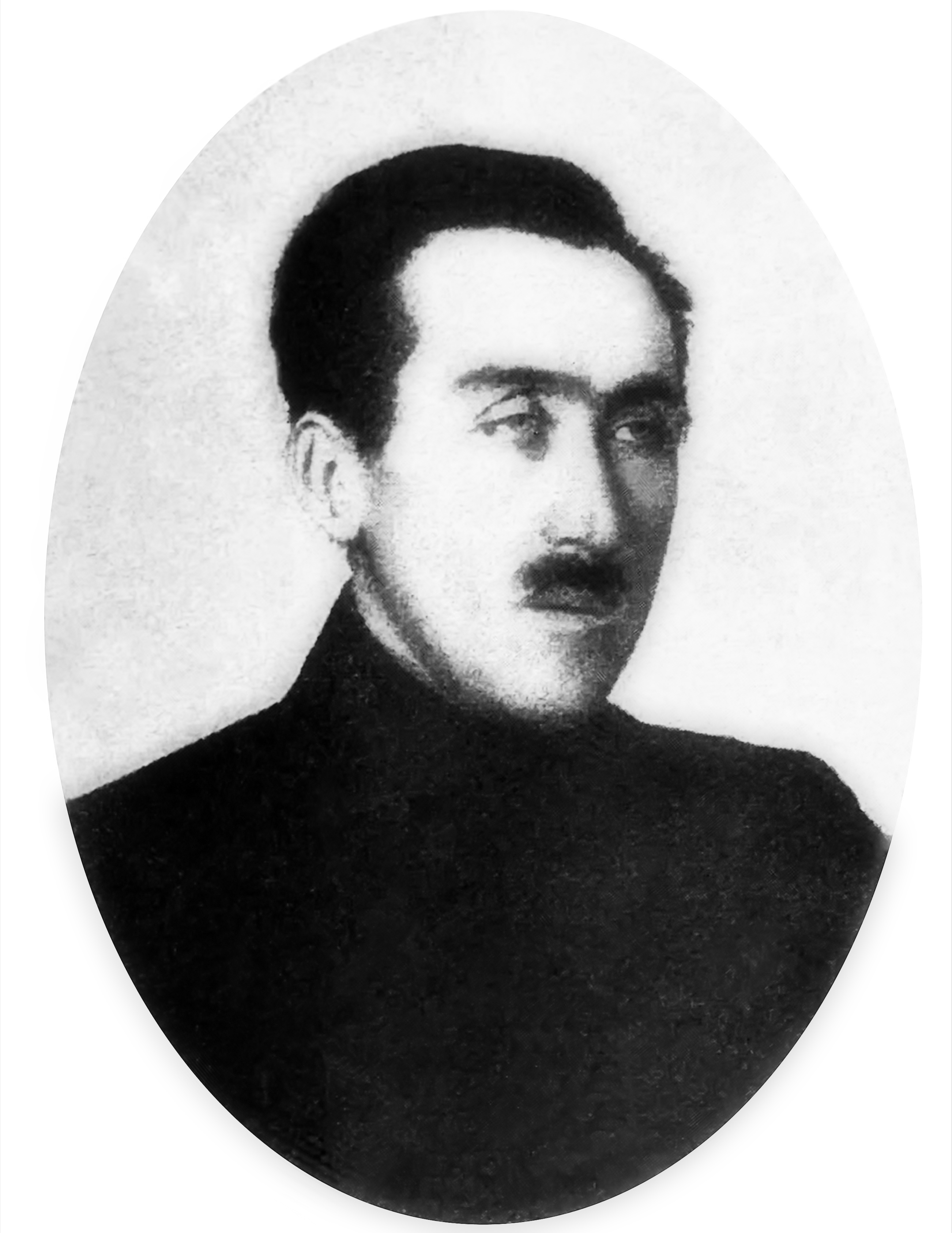
- Holubovych in 1928

2nd Prime Minister of the Ukrainian People's Republic
- In office January 31, 1918 – April 29, 1918
- President: Mykhailo Hrushevsky (speaker of Central Rada)
- Preceded by: Volodymyr Vynnychenko
- Succeeded by: Mykola Vasylenko (acting)

Personal details
- Born: February 1885 Balta uyezd, Russian Empire (now Holovanivsk Raion, Kirovohrad Oblast, Ukraine)
- Died: 16 May 1939 (aged 54) Yaroslavl, Soviet Union
- Party: UPSR (since 1912) (leader)
- Other political affiliations: Ukrainian Revolutionary Party (1903–1912)
- Spouse(s): Tetyana Kardynalovska (1917–1919); Frida Vitikhnovska (1922–1939)
- Children: Iryna Holubovych
- Alma mater: Kyiv Polytechnic Institute (1915)
- Occupation: Politician, engineer, editor

Vsevolod Oleksandrovych Holubovych (Ukrainian: Всеволод Олександрович Голубович; February 1885 – 16 May 1939) was the prime minister of the Ukrainian People's Republic from January to March 1918.

== Early period ==
Holubovych was born in the village of Poltavka, Baltsky Uyezd, Podolia Governorate. Vsevolod's father was Oleksandr Holubovych (Aug. 25, 1846 – Nov. 28, 1902) and his mother Iryna Ovsiyevna Yefremovych (Apr.29, 1859 – Oct.2, 1921). Born into a priest family, Holubovych as was expected to start his education in the Podilia Spiritual Seminary of Ivan Bohoslov (Kamianets-Podilskyi). Remarkable is the fact that the same seminary was attended by another future Prime Minister of Ukraine, Volodymyr Chekhivsky as a teacher. Vsevolod by the end of his studies in the seminary started to be interested in the political life in the country and in 1903 joined the Revolutionary Ukrainian Party.

Vsevolod decided to deviate from his family occupation, enrolling in the Engineering Department of the Kyiv Polytechnic Institute. In 1905 he was arrested for the first time and was excluded from the university. It took his mother's influence and connections to refrain Vsevolod from interrogations and reinstatement back into university. The administration of KPI reviewed her son's case and charged him with a simple administrative warning. Vsevolod was allowed to complete his studies in 1915 when Holubovych finally received his diploma in civil engineering (road network specialization). Considering all the complications that involved to reinstate him back in school, he nonetheless chose to ignore the warning and together with his friend Ivan Nemolovsky, who just returned from Belgium, established the Ukrainian Socialist-Revolutionary Party. The party has already was earning the popularity amongst various categories of population in the Russian Empire and especially in the Ukrainian lands.

== Professional life ==
Upon graduating Holubovych got a job as a professional railway engineer at the Southern Railways. Still in school, in 1914 he already worked as an assistant manager at a station in Kharkiv Governorate. According to his family documents as an assistant to the railway division in Odesa, Holubovych was receiving 1500 rubles pay and 375 rubles in living allowances. In September 1917 he was the chief of the department of water, highway, and road communications for the Romanian Front. In spring 1917 Holubovych created an Odesa department of the Ukrainian Socialist Revolutionary Party (UPSR) amongst the railway workers of the Odesa network. As the leader of that party he was elected to the Odesa City Council (Duma) and by April 1917 Holubovych headed the council.

== Revolution ==
He was a member of the Odesa Ukrainian Hromada, from the name of which he sent a petition to the Russian Provisional Government to give Ukraine its territorial autonomy. Due to the Soviet aggression on Ukraine without declaration of war and poor management of the State Affairs on the part of Volodymyr Vynnychenko, the Central Council was forced to appoint Vsevolod Holubovych as the head of Ukrainian government on January 31, 1918. Holubovych also headed the Ukrainian delegation to Brest-Litovsk and negotiated the Treaty of Brest-Litovsk. After a German-backed coup d'état, which installed Pavlo Skoropadskyi as Hetman of Ukraine on April 29, Holubovych was arrested and convicted in kidnapping of banker A. Dobryi. He was imprisoned until December 16, 1918, in Lukyanivka. In August 1920 was arrested again by the Special team of the 14th Army. A year later he was convicted to five years in prison as part of the Ukrainian SR process together with some other Ukrainian politicians such as Serhiy Ostapenko. Holubovych was amnestied right away in December 1921, and served as chairman of the Supreme Economic Council of the Ukrainian SSR until 1931.

In 1931 he was arrested together with his wife in Kharkiv and later convicted now as part of the fictitious Ukrainian National Center and imprisoned in Yaroslavl, Russian SFSR. He died in imprisonment in 1939.

== Family ==
- Oleksandr Kochanowsky (Ukrainian: Олександр Кохановський), a nephew, electrical-engineer (Kharkiv Technological Institute). Kochanovsky was born in Vinnytsia on May 25, 1904, and was a son of Zina Holubovych (sister of Vsevolod Holubovych). He was a member of the Ukrainian Society of Engineers. One of his several hobbies was to write poetry.

Political offices
Preceded by introduced	General Secretary of Transport; July 1917–August 14, 1917	Succeeded by Vadym Yeschenko
Preceded by introduced	General Secretary of Trade and Industry reformed into Ministry in 1918; November 20, 1917–January 18, 1918	Succeeded by I.Feschenko-Chopivsky

== See also ==
- Rumcherod

== Sources ==
- Vintsovskyi, T. S.; Muzychko, O. Ye.; Khmarskyi, V. M. (2011). "Vsevolod Holubovych: From Engineer to Prime Minister". The Black Sea Wave of the Ukrainian Revolution: Leaders of the National Movement in Odesa in 1917–1920. Odesa: TES. p. 586.
