= Viacheslav Prokopovych =

Ukrainian politician and historian (1881–1942)

- В'ячеслав Прокопович
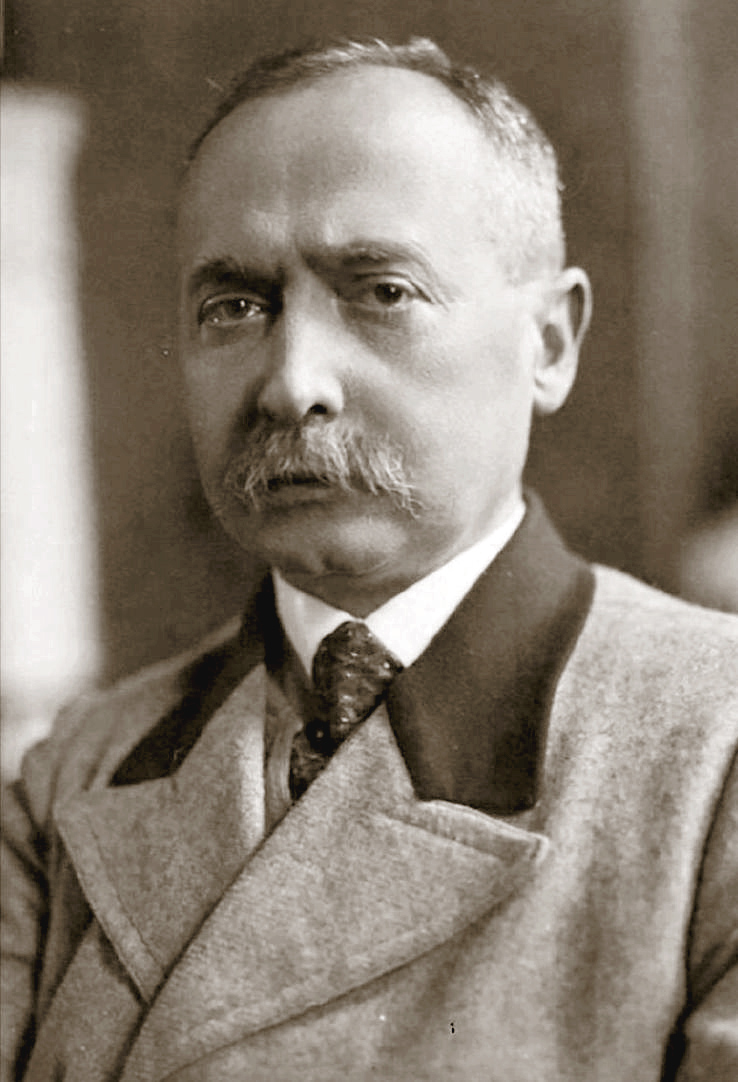
- Prokopovych in 1929

Chairman of the Council of People's Ministers
- In office 26 May 1920 – 14 October 1920
- Chairman: Symon Petliura
- Preceded by: Isaak Mazepa
- Succeeded by: Position abolished (Christian Rakovsky as Chairman of the Council of People's Commissars)

Personal details
- Born: 22 June 1881 Kiev, Russian Empire (now Kyiv, Ukraine)
- Died: 7 June 1942 (aged 60) Bessancourt, France
- Party: Ukrainian Democratic Party (from 1905)

Viacheslav Kostiantynovych Prokopovych (Note: Also rendered as Vyacheslav) (Ukrainian: В'ячеслав Костянтинович Прокопович; 22 June 1881 – 7 June 1942) was a Ukrainian politician and historian.

== Early life ==
Prokopovych was born on 22 June 1881 in the city of Kiev, which was then part of the Russian Empire (now Kyiv, Ukraine). He was the son of a priest named Kostiantyn Prokopovych. Soon after his birth, the family moved to Zlatopil where he spent his childhood before going to Bila Tserkva to its gymnasium there to obtain his secondary education. After completing his secondary education, he attended Saint Vladimir Imperial University of Kiev, where he was part of the Faculty of History and Philosophy as he studied history. He then became a history teacher at a gymnasium in Kiev, but he was dismissed shortly thereafter for his Ukrainophile viewpoints, and he was banned from teaching for several years until he was allowed to teach at a private gymnasium, also in Kiev.

== Political career ==
Starting in 1905, he was a politician of the Ukrainian Democratic-Radical Party (UDRP), established in Kiev. At the end of World War I, he was a member of the Ukrainian Party of Socialists-Federalists (UPSF) and Central Rada. In 1918, he served as the minister of education in a cabinet of Ukrainian People's Republic (UNR), headed by Vsevolod Holubovych. On 26 May 1920, Viacheslav Prokopovych became the prime minister of the UNR until 14 October 1920.

At the beginning of 1921 the government went into exile. The cabinet was headed twice by Prokopovych (March – August 1921, and May 1926 – October 1939). In 1925–1939, he was also a founder and chief editor of Tryzub, published in Paris.
