= Ukrainian Social Democratic Labour Party =

Ukrainian Social Democratic Labour Party Украї́нська соціа́л-демократи́чна робітни́ча па́ртія
- General Secretary: Volodymyr Vynnychenko
- Founded: 1905; 121 years ago
- Dissolved: 26 March 1950 (76 years, 149 days)
- Split from: Revolutionary Ukrainian Party
- Succeeded by: Ukrainian Socialist Party (in exile)
- Headquarters: Kyiv
- Ideology: Social democracy Factions: Central faction Left faction (Independents)
- Political position: Left-wing
- International affiliation: Labour and Socialist International
- Colours: Red

Party flag

The Ukrainian Social Democratic Labour Party (Ukrainian: Украї́нська соціа́л-демократи́чна робітни́ча па́ртія, romanized: Ukrainska sotsial-demokratychna robitnycha partiia), also commonly known as Esdeky (Ukrainian: Есдеки, from the abbreviation USDRP, УСДРП), was a social-democratic political party active in the Russian Empire and later in the Ukrainian People's Republic. The party was formed in 1905 by members of the Revolutionary Ukrainian Party and followed the formula of Marxism introduced by the Erfurt Program of the Social Democratic Party of Germany. It also supported the ideas of national and cultural autonomy. The party was led by Volodymyr Vynnychenko, Symon Petliura, Mykola Porsh, Dmytro Antonovych, Lev Yurkevych, Mykhailo Tkachenko, and Mykola Kovalsky.

The party identified resolution of the national question as its priority and saw the struggle for social liberation of the working class as secondary. In the spring of 1905, in his polemics with Dmytro Antonovych, which were published in the party newspaper Pratsia, Mykola Porsh expressed the view, that social and economic oppression was conditioned by national subjugation. He insisted that the resolution of national issue was necessary in order to overcome social oppression.

In Soviet propaganda, the party was identified as a petty bourgeoisie nationalistic party, which named itself "Social Democratic" as a means of deception. Vladimir Lenin characterized the party's members as "representatives of the most low-grade, stupid and reactionary nationalism" who supposedly betrayed "not only interests of democracy in general, but also their own fatherland, Ukraine."

== History ==
During the Revolution of 1905, the party was formed on the base of the already existing Revolutionary Ukrainian Party (RUP) established in Kharkiv. Its official foundation took place in December 1905 at the 2nd Party Congress of RUP. The party adopted the Erfurt Program of the Social Democratic Party of Germany.

In December 1905, the Ukrainian Social-Democratic Labour Party (USLDP) took a decision to join the Russian Social Democratic Labour Party, provided that it would be recognised as the sole representative of the Ukrainian proletariat within the latter. The Fourth (Unity) Congress of the RSDLP rejected the proposal to immediately discuss the terms of the merger, which had been made by the USDLP spokesman, and referred the matter to the Central Committee. At the USDLP party congress in June 1907 the party adopted an ultimatum-like resolution, urging RSDLP to recognize Ukrainian autonomy, and stating that Ukrainian Social-Democracy must have its representative in the Central Committee of RSDLP, and the latter must accept USDLP as its national organization among the Ukrainian proletariat. However, no agreement was reached on a merger. Arguably, the reason for that was the fact that the USLDP, the UPSR, and the URLDP all favoured an independent Ukrainian state.

After the USDLP party congress in March 1907, the party ceased much of its activities. During that time it closely coperated with the Jewish Bund, and Ukrainian Jews would later be included into the government of Ukraine. The party also established contacts with fellow Menshevik factions, and its membership reached 3,000 members. In 1908 the USDLP was suspended by the Russian government, and many of its activists went into exile, particularly to Austrian Galicia. In 1915, the bureau of the party's central committee in Ukraine was revived, replacing its regular central committee. In 1914, just before World War I, a group of emigré activists of the USDLP under the leadership of Dmytro Dontsov and Volodymyr Doroshenko joined the Galician Social Democrats, National Democrats and Radicals to form the Union for the Liberation of Ukraine. The Union declared its loyalty to the Central Powers of Austria-Hungary and German Empire, seeing them as allies in Ukraine's liberation Russian rule. Another group inside of the party opposed that view and supported Tsarist Russia. Among the latter were Symon Petlyura, who at the time worked as editor of Moscow newspaper Ukrainskaya zhyzn ("Ukrainian Life"), and his supporters. The rest of the party's members took an anti-war internationalist position and was represented by USDLP's foreign organization and its newspaper Borotba ("Struggle"), published in Geneva.

The party's activity was fully renewed in the spring of 1917. After the February Revolution, USDLP dominated the first Ukrainian government, the General Secretariat of Ukraine, which was headed by its member Volodymyr Vynnychenko. Eventually, it entered a coalition with the Ukrainian Party of Socialists-Federalists, which promoted federalism with the Russian Republic and was opposed to nationalistically-oriented forces such as the Democratic Agrarian Party and the Union of Land Owners. With time, USDLP lost its popularity in favor of the Ukrainian Socialist Revolutionary Party, which worked together with peasant representatives and swiftly gained popularity among military formations stationed within Ukraine. After the Fourth Universal declared Ukraine's independence, only two members of the party represented it in the government. In 1918, together with several other Ukrainian parties, USDLP formed the Ukrainian National Union, which opposed the Hetmanate of Pavlo Skoropadsky, and after the latter's deposition formed the Directorate.

During Soviet times, the party was portrayed as nationalistic, as it supported broad autonomy of the Ukrainian lands.

=== Splits ===
There were at least two splits in the USDLP.

The first split occurred soon after the party's revival and took place during the invasion by Soviet Russia in December 1917, as a group called Ukrainian Social Democrats (LUSD) officially left the USDLP and joined the Russian revolutionary forces. Among notable members of LUSD was Yevhen Neronovych. Some of its members later joined the Communist Party of Ukraine.

At the Fourth Party Congress on January 10–12, 1919, several members left the party and declared themselves nezalezhni - independents. Among the most prominent of such "independists" were Anatol Pisotsky, Vasyl and Yuriy Mazurenko, and Mykhailo Tkachenko. They recognized the necessity of installing the dictatorship of proletariat and establishing peace with Russia. The main faction represented among others by Mykola Porsh, Volodymyr Vynnychenko, Symon Petliura and Isaak Mazepa received the support of a majority of party members, opposing their ideas, promoting the concepts of Labor Democracy and socialization of main industries, and supporting of Directorate of Ukraine.

During the 1920s, independent SDPists formed the Ukrainian Communist Party, also known as UKPists, which opposed the Communist Party (Bolsheviks) of Ukraine and the general centralist course promoted by the Bolsheviks.

=== In exile ===
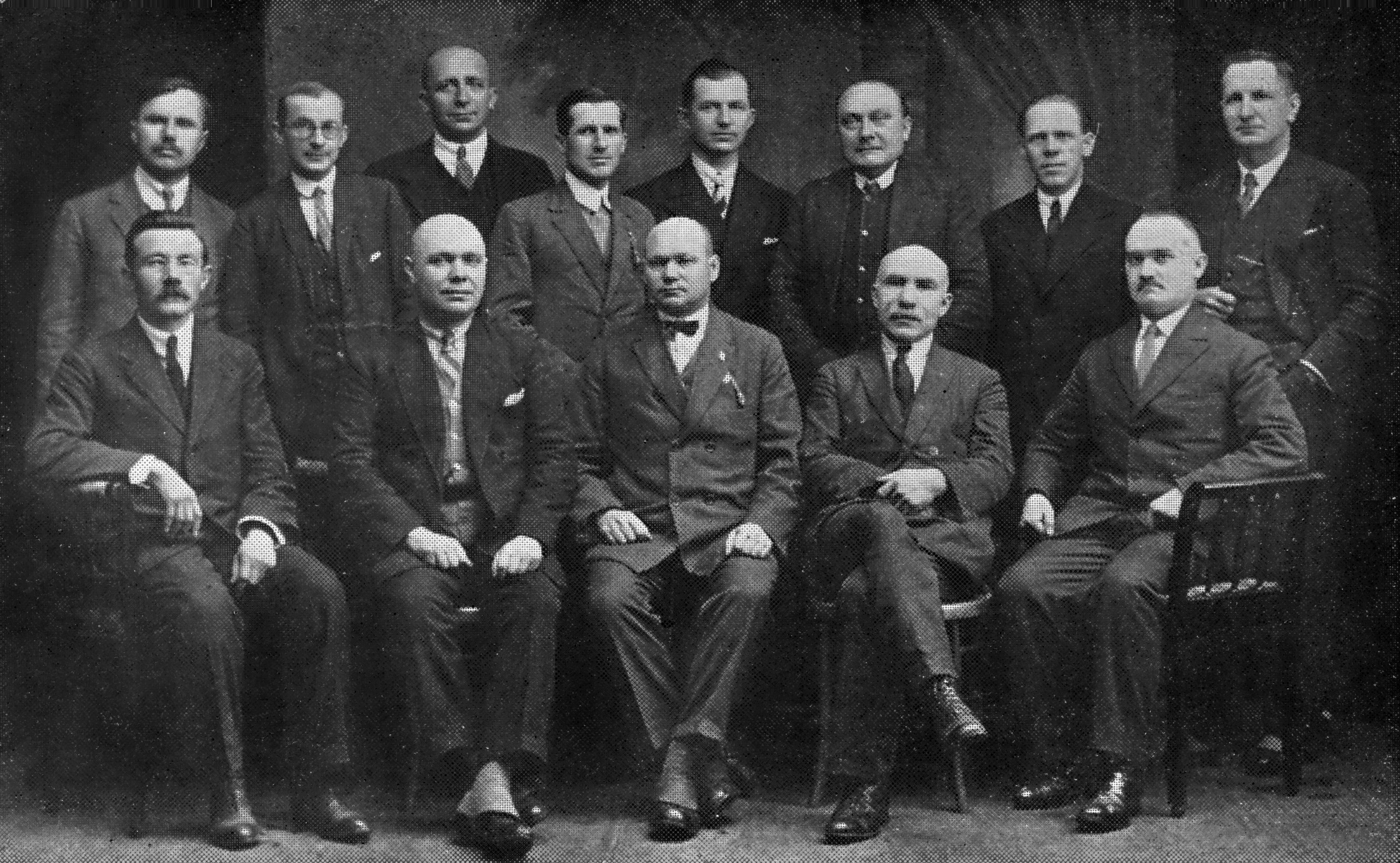
Participants of the Ukrainian Social Democratic Labour Party Conference in Poděbrady, 1926

As the government of Ukraine went into exile following the Russian-Ukrainian war of 1918–1919, a section of the USDLP formed the 'Foreign Delegation' of the party. During 1919 the party's Central Committee included Yosyp Bezpalko, Andriy Livytskyi, Mykola Shadlun and I. Romanchenko. At the party's conference in Vienna on September 9–13, 1919 the Central Committee urged its members to leave the government. USDLP had representatives in Czechoslovakia, Poland, Germany and France, establishing its office in Prague. Isaak Mazepa was the secretary of the Foreign Delegation, which also included Y. Bezpalko, Fedenko and I. Romanchenko. The party issued publications Sotsiyalistychna Dumka (published in Lviv and Prague), Vil'na Ukraina (Lviv) and Sotsiyaldemokrat (published monthly from 1925 from Poděbrady). The party was a member of the Labour and Socialist International between 1923 and 1940.

USDLP didn't participate in the Government of the Ukrainian People's Republic in exile, but was loyal to it. Following the Second World War its members participated in the creation of the Ukrainian National Council.

=== Successor party ===
In 1950 USDRP joined with other Ukrainian Socialist organizations, creating the Ukrainian Socialist Party. As of the early 1960s, Emil Wolynec was the acting chairman of that party, Opanas Fedenko its general secretary and Bohdan Fedenko served as the youth secretary. Other executive committee members of the party were Antin Czerneckyj, Iwan Luczyszyn and Spyrydon Dovhal. The party had its headquarters in London. It published the monthly Nashe Slovo from London with Opanas Fedenko as its editor. The party also issued the quarterly Vilna Ukraina from Detroit, with Mykola Nahirniak as its editor and Volodymyr Lysyj as its director. Vilna Ukraina and Nashe Slovo each had a circulation of around 1,000. Furthermore, there was a weekly newspaper (Narodna Volya) published from Scranton which was politically close to the party.

== Party official assemblies ==
- 1st Congress in 1905 was also the 3rd Congress of the Revolutionary Ukrainian Party.
- 2nd Congress on April 17–18, 1917 was also known as the reviving congress.
- 3rd Congress
- 4th Congress on January 12–14, 1919 (Kyiv) split into two factions: "official social-democracy" and "independent social-democracy"
- Conference on September 9, 1919 (Vienna)

== Party press media ==
- Slovo (English: Word) weekly, 1907–1909 in Kyiv.
- Pratsia (English: Work), newspaper
- Robitnyk (English: Worker), newspaper, from June 1917 in Kharkiv (three times a week) and 1919–1923 irregularly in Chernivtsi
- Nash Holos (English: Our Voice), newspaper in Lviv
- Robitnycha Hazeta (English: Worker's Gazette), a party diary

== See also ==
- Revolutionary Ukrainian Party
- General Secretariat of Ukraine
- Ukrainian Communist Party
