= Ukrainian Socialist-Revolutionary Party =

Ukrainian Socialist-Revolutionary Party Українська Партія Соціалістів-Революціонерів
- Leader: Vsevolod Holubovych
- Founded: 17 April 1917 (109 years, 127 days)
- Dissolved: 26 March 1950 (76 years, 149 days)
- Merged into: Ukrainian Socialist Party
- Headquarters: Kyiv
- Newspaper: Narodna Volia, Borotba (weekly)
- Membership (1917): 75,000
- Ideology: Agrarian socialism Narodism; Souverainism; Left-wing populism Factions: Central faction Left faction (Borotbists)
- Political position: Left-wing

Ukrainian Socialist-Revolutionary Party (Russian: Украинская партия социалистов-революционеров, romanized: Ukrainskaya partiya sotsialistov-revolyutsionerov; Ukrainian: Українська партія соціалістів-революціонерів, romanized: Ukrayinska partiya sotsialistiv-revolyutsioneriv; lit. 'Ukrainian Party of Socialists-Revolutionaries') was a political party in Ukraine and the Russian Republic founded in April 1917, based on separate groups and circles of SRs that existed on the territory of Ukraine since 1905. The left faction of the party dissolved it in 1918 forming a new party, while the Ukrainian Socialist-Revolutionary Party was recreated in January 1919 by its moderate faction members.

== General outlook ==
It was one of the most influential political parties in Ukraine as it was representing the interest of the major social class of Ukraine - peasants and to some extent soldiers. It closely cooperated with the All-Ukrainian Peasants Society (Spilka) on which the party relied its activities among farmworkers. The party's program was based on unifying principles of national interests and ideas of liberal populism. The determining issue of revolutionary change, it considered the national question, and its ultimate goal was to build a sovereign Ukrainian independent state. In November 1917 the Ukrainian Socialist-Revolutionary Party consisted of 75,000 members.

== Ideas and principles ==
- National personal autonomy for minorities
- Classless Ukrainian nation
- Communization of great arable lands
- Promoting principles of tenant farmers and farmworkers

== History ==
In the fall of 1906 the Simferopol circle of the Party established its new affiliations in Volyn and Podolia. The first organizations of the party appeared in the eastern region of Russian Ukraine: Kiev Governorate, Chernigov Governorate, Kherson Governorate, Poltava Governorate, and others.

The First Party Conference took place in Kiev in February 1907, where the Party Central Committee (CC) was elected. However, already in August 1907 numerous of the Party's members had been arrested and the CC was liquidated. The ones who managed to escape prosecution moved to Lwów, in the Austrian autonomous region of the Kingdom of Galicia and Lodomeria. In 1910-1911 there were attempts to reestablish the organization in Kiev and Kharkov. Although it was not until the 1913 that some of the Party underground organization reappeared in Ukraine. Around 1914 the Kievan group of the Party published its program in the magazine Borotba ("the Fight").

=== First steps ===
The Party officially was established on April 17, 1917 in Kyiv. The first Party Constituent Congress took place on May 4, 1917 in Kyiv as well where the party was officially declared "all-national." The second Party Congress took place on July 15–16, 1917 when the Party program and statutes were accepted. According to their rivals from the Ukrainian Social-Democratic Labor Party, the Party has rewritten its program from their colleagues, the Russian Socialist Revolutionary Party. The Party press-media became the newspaper Narodna Volia (The People's Will) and the magazine Borotba. The Party obtained 50% of all votes in Ukraine to the Russian Constituent Assembly.

The Party had several of its ministers in the General Secretariat of Ukraine, but after the IV Universal on January 30, 1918 the Party became in charge of the government, splitting only a couple of other ministries with the Social Democrats. Already in June 1917 several radical leaders of the Party held a conference at the Left-bank Ukraine, where they declared their disagreement with the Party's "center course." After the October Revolution, the party took measures to prevent the strengthening of Soviets in Ukraine. Since the establishment of the Ukrainian Central Rada, the party received majority in the parliament, while number of its member participated in the government of Ukraine. In January 1918, the Ukrainian Socialist Revolutionary Party became the nation's ruling party.

=== Parliamentary life ===
A crisis arose in December 1917 during one of the sessions of the Central Rada (7th and 8th) where the parliamentarians could not agree on the agrarian question. The majority of agrarian deputies were absolutely against the conservative agrarian law projects of the Socialist-Federalist K. Matskevich and the Social Democrat Borys Martos, who were supported by some SRs.

At the 3rd Party Congress in December 1917 the left SRs, with the support of deputies from the military political organizations, requested the Central Rada to promptly issue laws about the liquidation of private property (estates in particular), communization of series of various industries, and several other reforms that were part of the Party's program. Soon 12 members of the Party CC composed the nucleus of the "left opposition" in the Rada.

After the Declaration of Independence, an SR government—the Council of People's Ministers—was formed, headed by Vsevolod Holubovych. On January 18, 1918, under the influence of the left wing of the Party headed by Oleksandr Shumsky, the Central Rada finally accepted a provisional decree on the socialization of estates. However, on January 26, 1918 Kyiv was taken by the army of Mikhail Muravyov and the members of the Rada relocated to Zhytomyr.

There the Ukrainian left SRs were publishing their newspaper Molot (Hammer). With the support of the German Empire, Ukraine was liberated from the Russian occupation by March 1918. However, on April 29 the German military administration dispersed the Rada and arrested Prime Minister Vsevolod Holubovych accusing him in setting up a conspiracy to kidnap a financial official on April 25, 1918.

=== Split ===
At the 4th Party Congress on May 13–16, 1918 the party split into a left faction and a right faction. The Right SRs considered that the revolution was concluded and advocated for conducting a legal opposition to the government of Hetman Pavlo Skoropadsky. The Left SRs, known as "Borbysts," propagated the Soviet form of power, demanded cooperation with Bolsheviks, and advocated for the organization of underground resistance and preparation for an armed revolt against the Hetmanist regime. The Borbysts split away from the Party and formed the Ukrainian Party of Left Socialist-Revolutionaries, which allied with the Bolsheviks. In May 1918 another left-wing faction of the party, the "Borotbists," also split away, forming the Ukrainian Communist Party.

=== Exile ===
The party supported the Ukrainian People's Republic during the Ukrainian War of Independence. After the Bolshevik victory and the establishment of the Ukrainian Soviet Socialist Republic, most of its members went into exile in Vienna and then Prague, where they published the newspaper Trudova Ukraina ("Workers' Ukraine"). In 1948, it took part in the establishment of the National Rada in Exile.

On 26 March 1950 it merged with the Ukrainian Social Democratic Labour Party and the Ukrainian Radical Socialist Party to form the Ukrainian Socialist Party.

== Notable members ==
Central current

- Mykhailo Hrushevsky, chairman of the Central Rada, member of the Mala Rada and the CC of the UPSR.
- Vsevolod Holubovych
- Pavlo Khrystiuk
- Mykyta Shapoval
- Fedir Shvets
- Oleksandr Sevriuk

Left faction (Borotbists)

- Oleksandr Shumskyi
- Hryhoriy Hrynko
- Vasyl Ellan-Blakytnyi
