= First Vynnychenko government =

The first government lasted from June 28 1917 until August 13 when the Mala Rada accepted the resignation of V.Vynnychenko. Most ministers later were imprisoned by the Soviet regime, the rest managed to survive abroad.

== Composition ==
Party key	Jewish Bund
Party key	USDRP
Party key	UPSR
Party key	UPSF
Party key	Fareynikte
Party key	PDCP
Party key	RPSR

Office	Party	Incumbent
Secretary of Internal Affairs		Volodymyr Vynnychenko
Secretary of Nationalities		Serhiy Yefremov
Deputy - Jewish Affairs		Moishe Zilberfarb
Deputy - Polish Affairs		Mieczysław Mickiewicz
Secretary of Finance		Khrystofor Baranovsky
Secretary of Court Affairs		Valentyn Sadovsky
Secretary of Military Affairs		Symon Petliura
Secretary of Agrarian Affairs		Borys Martos
Secretary of Education		Ivan Steshenko
Secretary of Food Supply		Mykola Stasyuk
Chancellor		Pavlo Khrystiuk
Controller		Moisei Rafes
Secretary of Communications		Aleksandr Zarubin
Secretary of Transportation		Vsevolod Holubovych

The last three portfolios of the First Secretariat were added on July 13, three more (Trade/Industry, Labor, and Russian Affairs) assigned to Bolsheviks were never filled due to boycott.

Events

- June 26, 1917 - announcement of the Declaration of General Secretariat at the plenum meeting of Central Rada
- June 28, 1917 - First Cabinet with 9 portfolios (8 secretaries and 1 chancellor), the Secretary of Internal Affairs is the chairman
- Before the July Days - meeting with the delegation from the Russian Provisional Government
- July 13, 1917 - the General Secretariat was recognized as the highest executive power in Ukraine, members of which would be confirmed by the Russian Provisional Government, expansion of Secretariat with 6 more portfolios added (2 secretaries, 3 deputy-secretary of nationalities, and 1 controller)
- End of July 1917 - during the political crisis in the republic meeting with members of the newly elected Russian government, Kerensky's "Instruktsiya" recognizing the Statue and the jurisdiction of the General Secretariat over five guberniyas
- August 7, 1917 - Vynnychenko files resignation in the protest to acceptance of "Instruktsiya" by Central Rada
- August 13, 1917 - Central Rada accepts his resignation and appoints Dmytro Doroshenko as the new chairman, confirming his new government already the next day
- August 18, 1917 - Doroshenko files resignation, Vynnychenko was offered to form a government once again

Deputy-Secretaries of Nationalities

Secretary of Nationalities was expanded by the request of the Provisional Government as the minority representatives to Undersecretaries of ethnic affairs (deputies) and soon on July 17 Yefremov was replaced by Oleksander Shulhyn.

At first the deputy secretaries of Nationalities were part of the secretariat of Nationalities headed initially by Yefremov. With the proclamation of the III Universal on December 22, 1917 on the initiative of Oleksandr Shulhyn the Secretariat of Nationalities was transformed into the Secretariat of Foreign Affairs. The position for the Russian Affairs representative for quite sometime was left unoccupied although was specifically reserved for the Russian Provisional Government. After the Secretariat was reorganized as the Council of Ministers the deputy-secretaries received their own ministerial assignments.

== Prosecutions ==
- Six ministers were imprisoned (five died in prison): Serhiy Yefremov, Valentyn Sadovsky, Mykola Stasyuk, Pavlo Khrystiuk, Moisei Rafes, Vsevolod Holubovych
- Seven ministers emigrated: Volodymyr Vynnychenko, Moishe Zilberfarb, Mieczysław Mickiewicz, Khrystofor Baranovsky, Symon Petliura, Borys Martos, Mykola Stasyuk
- Confirmed assassinations: Symon Petliura, Ivan Steshenko
- Fate uncertain: Mykola Stasyuk, Aleksandr Zarubin
