= Second Vynnychenko government =

The second government was organized by Volodymyr Vynnychenko after Dmytro Doroshenko government of which was confirmed on August 14, resigned on August 18. Many ministers picked by Doroshenko were left at their positions, while other ministries were filled by Social-Democrats. The new Secretariat was confirmed by the Russian Provisional Government on September 1.

Designation of the government portfolios by parties (in parentheses - after the III Universal on November 20):

Ukrainian 13 (13)

- Ukrainian Social Democratic Labour Party - 5 (6)
- Ukrainian Party of Socialists-Federalists - 4 (2)
- Ukrainian Socialist-Revolutionary Party - 2 (4)
- Ukrainian Party of Socialists-Independists - 1 (1)
- Non-partizan - 1 (0)

non-Ukrainian 1+3

- Russian SR - 1 (0)
- General Jewish Labour Bund - 0 (1)
- United Jewish Socialist Workers Party - 1 (1)
- Labour Popular Socialist Party - 1 (1)
- Polish Democratic Center Party - 1 (1)

Note:in red are members that were prosecuted for representing the Ukrainian government.

Ministry/Position	Name	Party	Replacement
Chancellor (Secretary)	Oleksander Lototsky	UPSF	Ivan Mirny (UPSF) (acting)
Internal Affairs (chairman)	Volodymyr Vynnychenko	USDRP	
Finance	Mikhail Tugan-Baranovsky	UPSF	Vasyl Mazurenko (USDRP) (acting)
Nationalities	Oleksandr Shulhyn	UPSF	
Agrarian Affairs	Mykhailo Savchenko^{a}	N/A (Peasant rep.)	Oleksandr Zarudny (UPSR)
Education	Ivan Steshenko	independent USDRP	
Commissioner	Petro Stebnytsky	UPSF	disbanded
Controller	Aleksandr Zarubin	Russian SR	Aleksandr Zolotarev Jewish Bund

Note:
^a). Little or no information is available on Mykhailo Savchenko-Bilsky. Being a member of the Ukrainian Socialist-Revolutionaries, he was elected to the Secretariat as a representative of the Peasant Association. Until then Savchenko worked as an agronomist near Borzna (Chernigov Governorate). He resigned after the proclamation of the 3rd "Universal". During Hetmanate Savchenko was in the All-Ukrainian Zemstvo Union.

The expanded Secretariat (November 12, 1917).

Ministry/Position	Name	Party	Replacement
Military Affairs	Symon Petliura	USDRP	Mykola Porsh (USDRP) Jan.6
Naval Affairs	new edition		Dmytro Antonovych (USDRP)
Food Supply	Mykola Kovalevsky	(UPSR)	
Post and Telegraph	Aleksandr Zarubin	Russian SR	Mykyta Shapoval (UPSR)
Trade and Industry	Vsevolod Holubovych	UPSR	
Labor	Mykola Porsh	USDRP	
Justice	Mykhailo Tkachenko	USDRP	
Transport	Vadym Yeshchenko	UPSI	

- Deputy-Secretary of Military Affairs - Oleksandr Zhukovsky (UPSR)
- Deputy-Secretary of Education - P.Kholodny (UPSF)
- Deputy-Secretary of Internal Affairs - I.Kraskovsky (UPSF), O.Karpynsky, and L.Abramovych

Deputy-Secretaries of Nationalities

At first the deputy secretaries of Nationalities were part of the secretariat of Nationalities headed initially by Yefremov. With the proclamation of the III Universal on December 22, 1917, on the initiative of Oleksandr Shulhyn the Secretariat of Nationalities was transformed into the Secretariat of Foreign Affairs. The position for the Russian Affairs representative for quite sometime was left unoccupied although was specifically reserved for the Russian Provisional Government. After the Secretariat was reorganized as the Council of Ministers the deputy-secretaries received their own ministerial assignments.

Position	Name	Party	Later fate
Jewish Affairs	Moishe Zilberfarb	UJSWP	
Polish Affairs	Mieczysław Mickiewicz	PDCP	
Russian Affairs	Dmitriy Odinets	RRNSP	
