= All-Ukrainian National Congress =

1917 meeting of Ukrainian independence activists

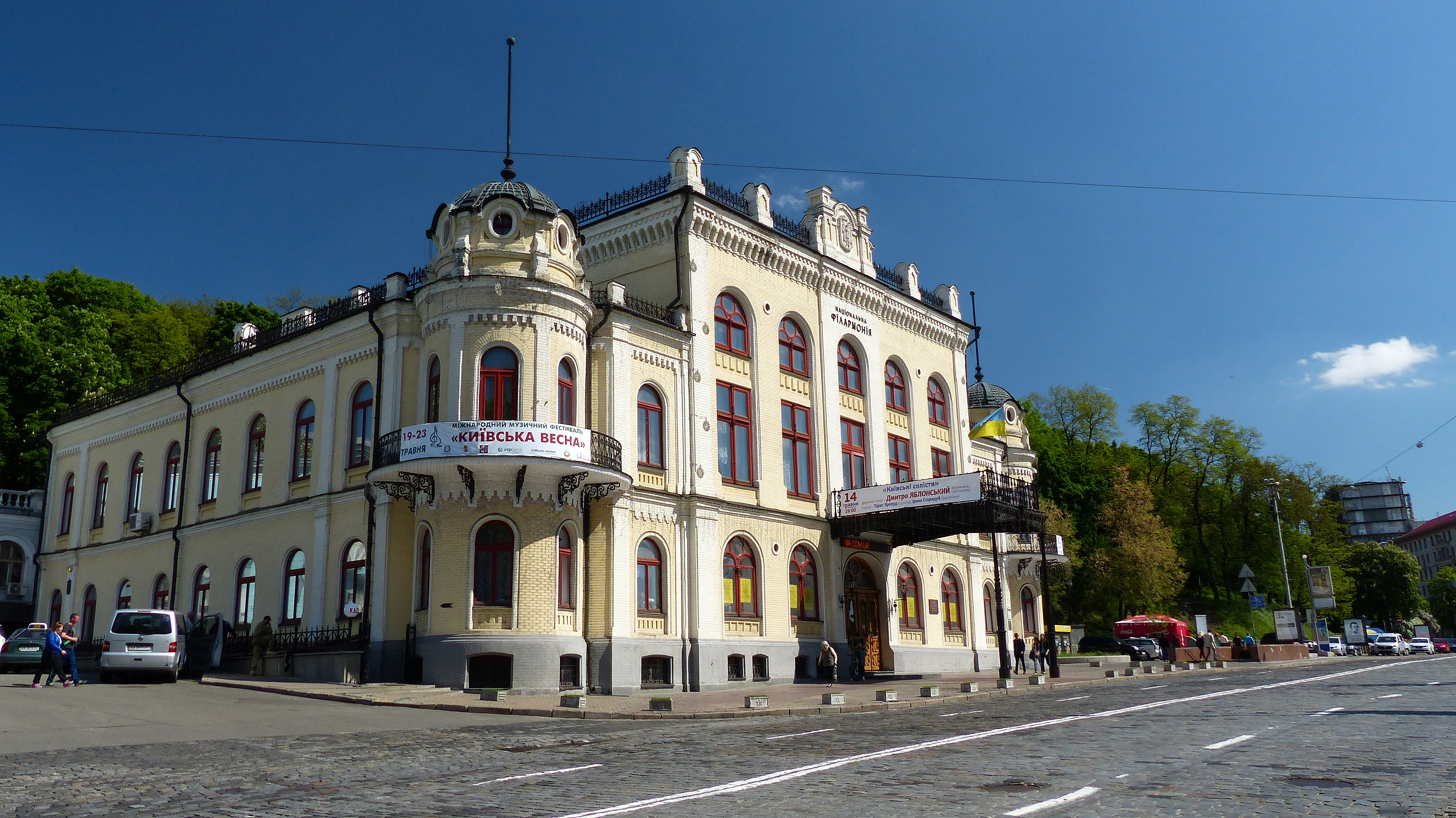
Building of the National Philharmonic of Ukraine, where the congress took place

All-Ukrainian National Congress became the first representative forum of the Ukrainian national movement in Ukraine and the first step towards the creation of Ukrainian National State. The congress was organized by the Ukrainian Central Rada and took place on 19–21 April [O.S. 6–8 April] 1917. The congress took place about a month after the creation of the Central Council of Ukraine and the 1917 March events in Petrograd. There were 1,500 delegates that participated in the congress, including 700 delegates with voting rights, 200 with consultative voting rights, and the rest as guests and invited participants. The key purpose of the congress was to recognize the Central Council of Ukraine as the All-Ukrainian National representative authority and widen its competency over the whole territory of Ukraine (until mid-April, decisions of the Central Council of Ukraine de facto had power only for the city of Kyiv).

== The purpose and preparation of Congress ==
The All-Ukrainian National Congress was convened on April 6–8, 1917 in Kyiv. Its importance was determined by the very purpose of convening the forum - to make the Central Rada the governing body of the Ukrainian national movement and to expand its social base, to refocus the priorities of activities from cultural and educational to state-centered.

=== The growth of the national movement ===
During the month of the revolution, after a series of national demonstrations, and in particular the Freedom Day in Kyiv, the Ukrainian liberation movement gained such a magnitude that the Ukrainian Central Rada, in its original composition, could no longer count on its successful leadership. All Ukrainian society of that time, its leadership, also felt the need to transform the Central Rada into a more authoritative and competent body than the one created in early March 1917, mainly by representatives of Kyiv NGOs. At the same time, leading politicians wanted to demonstrate in a unique way their potential on an all-Ukrainian scale and to identify with the support of a reputable national body the principle line of the national liberation struggle, which inevitably became more evident.

=== Organization of the congress ===
The first notice of the convening of the congress was published on March 19, 1917, in the newspaper "Visti from the Ukrainian Central Council". On March 28, the "Kievskaya Mysl" newspaper published a program of the congress and instructions for its election, prepared by Mikhaylo Hrushevsky. The congress is scheduled for Easter holidays - April 6, 7, 8 (Thursday, Friday and Saturday of Easter). The leaders of the Central Rada intended to hold a congress on the principles of territorial representation with the participation of all regions of Ukraine in order to transform the organization into a nationwide one.

In his article "On the All-Ukrainian Congress", published on March 29, 1917, Mykhailo Hrushevsky called on Ukrainians and non-Ukrainians "of all regions, territories and nooks and crannies of our national territory standing on the Ukrainian political platform" to take an active part in its work, which will contribute to the successful fulfillment of its expectations. The author emphasized:

"The central task of the congress is to complete our organization. The Central Rada, created in Kyiv by representatives of all Kyiv strata and supplemented by delegates of extracurricular organizations, is now recognized as a central Ukrainian government by all Ukrainian conscious people. The congress should give it the latest form, select it in its permanent composition… in a word, systematize and bring to the system and order an all-Ukrainian national organization."

The preparation of the forum took place under intense circumstances. There were rumors throughout the city that the Central Rada could be dispersed by military force to prevent the National Congress from being convened and Ukraine's autonomy proclaimed. At a meeting with the Kyiv Executive Committee, Mykhailo Hrushevsky and Dmitry Antonovich expressed the desire of Ukrainian Central Council to build their activities on a legal basis and assured that the Congress did not aim to proclaim the autonomy of Ukraine. At the time, they considered this case a task of the future.

=== The hidden purpose of the Congress ===
However, in his memoirs, Mykhailo Hrushevsky cites some facts that reveal the "internal logic" of congressional preparation.

The Chairman of the Central Rada noted that the initiators of the action wanted to conduct it as soon as possible in order to document the seriousness and inaccessibility of the Ukrainian social claims to the central government:

"The Provisional Government tended to postpone everything to the Constituent Assembly and packed Ukrainian business there in the complex of the national question altogether. But it recognized the cases of Finland, Poland, the Caucasus noon so clear to himself that it thought it possible to immediately decree his political rights to them, without waiting for the Constituent Assembly. So, we needed to demonstrate the nation-wide imperative nature of Ukrainian claims, perhaps vividly and unequivocally… Through the heads of our Kyiv enemies and slanderers, we needed to show not only the Provisional Government, but all Russian citizenship, that our claims are common, popular and the people await their fulfillment impatiently, take every wire to heart, and joke with such a delay "to the Constituent Assembly," which, when unknown, is not entirely safe."

== Composition and participants ==
From March 28 until the moment of the convening of the Congress Ukrainian newspapers regularly covered the topic of the convening of April 6, 1917, national Congress, the norms of representation in it and the printed proposed program. In particular, it was emphasized:

"Representatives should be sent by all Ukrainian organizations, political, cultural, professional, territorial, which accept the claim of broad national-territorial autonomy of Ukraine and the fullness of political and cultural Ukrainian life, that is: party organizations; societies cultural, educational and economic; working, peasant, military, clergy, clerks, youth of all schools; villages, towns and counties organizations."

=== Conditions for participation in the meeting ===
If the number of members of the organization did not exceed 50, it had the right to send one delegate with a decisive vote, more than 50 - respectively two, more than 100 - three, 200 - four, 300 five (but no more). With an advisory vote, any "organized Ukrainian" could take part in the Congress, with the permission of the Presidium.

This system was developed personally by Mykhailo Hrushevsky. In his "Memories" he wrote:

"… For the сongress I created a system of mixed representation, so that in addition to the representation of the national, there was something from the representation of the territorial. Representation was given to Ukrainian national organizations - from every ten Ukrainians organized in any organization, one representative could be sent to the congress; but one representative could send each village community, whatever it wanted, every factory and every military unit. Only such representatives, who are given written mandates, will have the right to cast a decisive vote at the congress - we have emphasized that the tributaries should not be treated as arbitrary and irresponsible gathering - all other guests will be non-voting guests at the congress."

=== Arrival of guests and delegates ===
The organizers feared that due to poor awareness, poor transport performance, and possibly low political activity of the Ukrainian Congress, it would not be sufficiently representative. However, these expectations were not met. The Congress was widely represented by delegates from all Ukrainian provinces, different sections of the population, many political parties (USSR, USDP, UPSF, UPP, social movements, peasant unions, student communities, cooperative organizations). Representatives of Ukrainian communities of Petrograd, Moscow, Kuban, Voronezh region, Bessarabia, Saratov and other territories outside Ukraine also attended the meeting. In total, about 1500 participants (delegates with a decisive and advisory vote, as well as guests) registered.

Famous Ukrainian cultural and social figures - Mykhailo Hrushevsky, Volodymyr Vynnychenko, Serhiy Yefremov, Ilia Shrah, Petro Stebnytsky, Liudmyla Starytska-Cherniakhivska, Dmytro Doroshenko, Motepan, took the honorary place among the delegates who arrived at the congress.

However, the most important role in this assembly was played by a small element - peasants, soldiers and workers. Together with the intelligentsia and the student youth, they became aware and proudly called themselves "Ukrainians" for the shortest time. In some ways - intuitively, and in some - consciously, but unconditionally infusing into the ranks of the movement, they thus irrevocably gave him a mass national-political orientation and character. This fact has touched even, for the most part, always academically cold, Hrushevsky:

"The sincere impulse immediately united and merged into a single body this multi-thousand-strong community that gathered from different parts of Ukraine for the first time at a large national assembly."

== The course of the All-Ukrainian Congress ==
The meetings of the All-Ukrainian Congress were held in Kyiv in the hall of the Merchant Assembly (now the National Philharmonic of Ukraine, Volodymyr Uzviz, 2).

The activity of delegates was turbulent - in three days more than 300 public speeches took place.

Mykhailo Hrushevsky, who opened the congress, would be unanimously elected honorary chairman of the meeting. Hrushevsky's ideas and theoretical conclusions were transferred to the approved documents.

=== The first day (April 6, 1917) ===
On the first day of the Congress, April 6, 1917, the following topics were announced and discussed:

- "State law and federal competitions in Ukraine" (speaker Dmytro Doroshenko);
- "Federalism. Demand of the Democratic Federal Republic of Russia" (speaker: Alexander Shulgin);
- "Autonomy - broad and unlimited, national-territorial and national. Claiming the broad national-territorial autonomy of Ukraine and the rights of national minorities and their security" (speaker Fedir Matushevsky);

At the end of the first day of the Congress, at the suggestion of Mykhailo Hrushevsky, it was read and after taking into account some amendments, unanimously adopted resolutions that embodied the Ukrainian mood at that time:

"1. In accordance with the historical traditions and modern real needs of the Ukrainian people, the Congress considers that only the national-territorial autonomy of Ukraine will meet the needs of our people and all other nationalities living on Ukrainian land.

2. The autonomous system of Ukraine, as well as other autonomous countries of Russia, will have full guarantees for themselves in the federal system.

3. Therefore, the only appropriate form of government is the Congress considers the Federal Russian Democratic Republic.

4. And one of the main principles of Ukrainian autonomy is the full protection of the rights of national minorities living in Ukraine."

The next day, the congress approved an annex to the fourth item of the resolution:

"The Congress recognizes the necessity that in those countries of the Federal Russian Republic in which the Ukrainian people constitute a minority of the population, the Ukrainian people are guaranteed minority rights under the same conditions as those in Ukraine provided for minority rights of non-Ukrainians."

=== Second day (April 7, 1917) ===
On April 7, the congress delegates heard the reports:

- "The main reasons for the organization of Ukrainian autonomy" (Mykhailo Tkachenko)
- "Method and procedure of actual creation of autonomy of Ukraine" (Fedir Kryzhanovsky)
- "On the Territory and Population of Autonomous Ukraine" (Valentyn Sadovsky)
- "On Ensuring the Rights of National Minorities" (P. Poniatenko)
- "Specific Ukrainian claims to the Provisional Government" (S. Kolos)

As a result of the following considerations and provisions, the resolution was adopted following the results of the second day of Congress:

"1) The Ukrainian National Congress, recognizing the Russian Constituent Assembly the right to sanction a new polity in Russia, including the autonomy of Ukraine, and the federal system of the Russian Republic, believes, however, that prior to the convening of the Russian Constituent Assembly supporters of the new order in Ukraine cannot remain passive, but in agreement with the smaller peoples of Ukraine, they must immediately create the grounds for her autonomous life.

2) The Ukrainian Congress, meeting the wishes of the Provisional Government on the organization and unification of public forces, recognizes the urgent need to organize a Local Council (Regional Council) of representatives of Ukrainian territories and cities, nationalities and social groups, to which the Ukrainian Central Council must take the initiative.

3) The Ukrainian Congress, recognizing the right of all nations to political self-determination, considers: a) that the borders between states should be established in accordance with the will of border people; b) that in order to ensure this, it is necessary that, in addition to the representatives of the belligerent states, the representatives of those peoples on the territory of which war is taking place, including Ukraine, should be admitted to a peace conference."

Although Mykhailo Hrushevsky later criticized the level of the papers delivered and discussed them, the academic form of the congress helped to inform the Ukrainian national movement. The Congress demonstrated that the autonomy-federalist orientations prevailed in the Ukrainian environment indivisibly. Few supporters of self-views had every reason to be seriously disappointed.

On the same day, congratulations were heard with representatives of different organizations and regions not only of Ukraine, but also of other peoples - Russian, Polish, Jewish, Estonian.

The newspapers solemnly described the second day of the meeting as "a day of unforgettably majestic brotherhood of representatives of almost all peoples of Russia", in which "the mood of all non-state nations seeking freedom" was reflected.

=== The third day (April 8, 1917) ===
The last day of the Congress was devoted to holding elections to the Central Rada. Mykhailo Hrushevsky twice (April 7 and April 8) reported on the principles of the election, the norms of representation, which were approved after the discussion. Initially by secret ballot, at the insistence of Hrushevsky, the Chairman of the Central Rada was elected, then - openly - two of his deputies and, finally, - deputies of the Rada.

==== Election ====
The election of the Ukrainian Central Rada head began with a standing ovation: "We have a head", "Father Hrushevsky is our head". However, at the insistence of Mykhailo Hrushevsky, the formal procedure was adhered to: the Ukrainian Central Rada chairman was elected virtually unanimously (by 588 votes, 5 votes were cast for each of the contenders nominated by the congress and also ran for this high post). Volodymyr Vynnychenko and Serhiy Yefremov were elected vice-presidents.

The Congress elected 115 deputies to the Central Rada:

- from educational and other organizations of the city of Kyiv - 13;

- from Kyiv military organizations - 8;

- from cooperative organizations, the Peasant Union, teachers and students - 5 each;

- from the Ukrainian Women's Union - 1;

- from the Union of Ukrainian Autonomists-Federalists - 5;

- from USDRP - 4;

- from the USSR and the UDDP - 3 each;

- from Ukrainian People's Party - 1;

- from most provincial cities - 3 each;

- from the provinces (except the centers) - 4 deputies each.

Ukrainians of Kuban, Bessarabia, Petrograd, Moscow, Rostov, Saratov also received representation in the Central Rada. In total, eight Ukrainian provinces and major cities received 60 seats in the council, which is more than half.

Naturally, the share of the active participants of the liberation movement was high in the composition of the Central Rada (Ivan Steshenko, Liudmyla Starytska-Cherniakhivska, Andriy Yakovliv, Dmytro Doroshenko, Viacheslav Prokopovych, Yevhen Chykalenko, Fedir Matushevsky, Andriy Nirsnenpsky, Andriy Nirpensky, Mykola Stasiuk, Mykhailo Tkachenko, Valentyn Sadovsky, Mykola Mykhnovsky, Mykola Kuzmenko and others). At the same time, many deputy mandates were given to promising young people who did not hesitate to enter the arena of active political activity (Pavlo Khrystiuk, Mykola Shrah, Mykhailo Yeremiiev, Levko Chykalenko, Mykola Liubynsky, Mykola Levytsky, Viktor Pavelko, S. Kolos).

It was also decided to unite the agitation and information commission into an organizational one, and its chairman - Dmitry Antonovich - to invite to the committee by a Comrade of the chairman.

==== Formation of the Mala Rada ====
At the first organizational meeting on April 8, 1917, Mykhailo Hrushevsky proposed to elect an executive committee called the Committee of the Ukrainian Central Rada (later called the Mala Rada), consisting of 20 people. It was elected Chairman of the committee, his deputies Vynnychenko and Yefremov, Comrade Chairman - F. Kryzhanivsky, treasurer - V. Koval, secretaries - V. Boiko and S. Veselovsky.

=== Decision ===
At the end of the third day of work, the National Congress adopted the following decisions:

"1) The Ukrainian National Congress protests against claims made by the Provisional Polish State Council on land claims by the Provisional Polish State Council in a declaration calling on the Provisional Government of the Russian Federation to unite the Polish people with a free Russian state. The Ukrainian people will not tolerate any efforts to seize the rights to the territory of Ukraine.

2) The Ukrainian National Congress, having heard the statements and specific proposals of the Ukrainian delegates of the army and navy, instructs the Central Council to submit those specific requests to the Provisional Government.

3) The Ukrainian National Congress has decided to send greetings to the Ukrainians to the front.

4) The Ukrainian National Congress instructs the Central Rada to take as soon as possible the initiative of the Union of those peoples of Russia who, like Ukrainians, seek national-territorial autonomy on democratic grounds in the Federal Republic of Russia.

5) The Ukrainian National Congress approves the Central Rada to organize a committee of its deputies and representatives of national minorities to develop a draft autonomous statute of Ukraine. This charter must be proposed for approval by the Congress of Ukraine, organized in such a way that it expresses the will of the people of the whole territory of Ukraine. The sanction of the autonomous system of Ukraine is recognized, according to the resolution of the previous days, by the Constituent Assembly.

6) The Ukrainian National Congress, having heard resolutions passed to it from the meeting of the Peasant Union concerning the prohibition, sale and mortgage of land and forests, as well as the long-term lease of underground treasures (coal, ores and others), decides to submit them to the Central Council for a corresponding statement to the Provisional Government."
