= Valentyn Sadovsky =

Ukrainian politician (1886–1947)

Valentyn Sadovsky Валентин Садовський
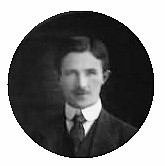

Secretary/Minister of Court Affairs
- In office 15 June 1917 – February 1918
- Prime Minister: Volodymyr Vynnychenko
- Preceded by: position created
- Succeeded by: Serhiy Shelukhin

Personal details
- Born: 1886 Plishchyn, Volhynia Governorate
- Died: 24 November 1947 (aged 60–61) Lukyanivska Prison, Kiev, Soviet Union
- Party: Revolutionary Ukrainian Party, Ukrainian Social Democratic Labor Party
- Education: Saint Petersburg Polytechnic Institute
- Occupation: geographer, economist, politician
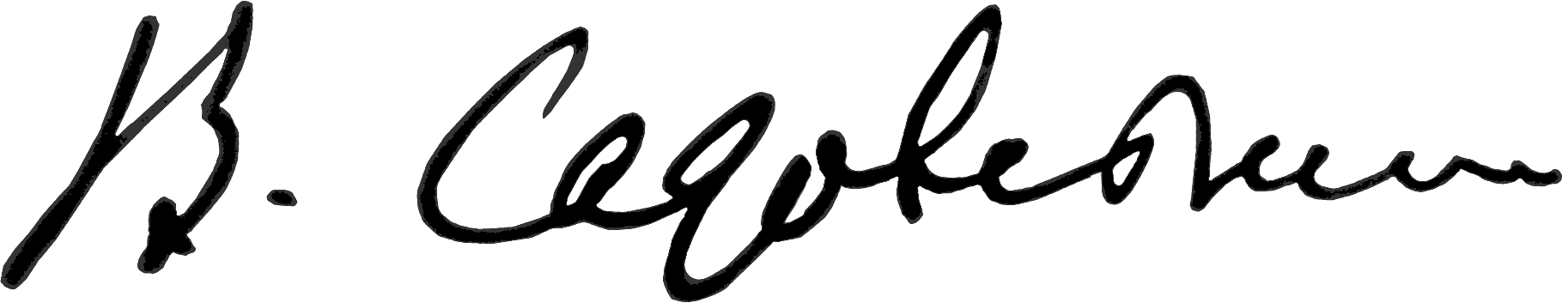
- Signature

Valentyn Sadovsky (Ukrainian: Валентин Васильович Садовський) was a politician, scientist, journalist, economist of Ukraine. He was a member of the Shevchenko Scientific Society (1935) and the Ukrainian Science Institute in Warsaw.

== Brief biography ==
Sadovsky was born in village of Plishchyn (today in Shepetivka Raion), Volhynia Governorate in a family of priest. He graduated from the Ostroh gymnasium and later the law school of Kyiv University. In 1909 Sadovsky enrolled to the economical college of Saint Petersburg Polytechnic Institute. Since 1904 he is a member of the Revolutionary Ukrainian Party and after its split stayed with members of the Ukrainian Social Democratic Labour Party. In 1907 Sadovsky was arrested for correspondence with social democratic organizations.

In March 1917 he was elected to the Central Council of Ukraine and soon to its Little Council. On 28 June 1917 Sadovsky was appointed a Secretary of Court Affairs (Justice). He also served as a deputy chairman of the General Secretariat of Ukraine along with Serhiy Yefremov. After the Hetman coup-d'etat, he participated in peace negotiations with the Russian delegation, while being a member of the underground "Ukrainian National Union".

In October 1920 Sadovsky was entrusted with the position of a minister of Labor which he kept for the next two years. In November 1920 along with the rest of government emigrated to Poland and later Czechoslovakia.

In May 1945 Sadovsky was arrested by military counter-intelligence of the 1st Ukrainian Front in Prague. He was charged with publishing anti-Soviet works, which could have resulted up to 10 years imprisonment or capital punishment. Over two years Sadovsky was awaiting for the sentence before being killed by criminals of the Lukyanivska Prison on 24 November 1947.

== Works ==
- Outline of economic geography Ukraine (1920)
- Problems of industrialization in the national economy (1929)
- Modern problems of the economy of Ukraine (1931, co-author)
- Labor in the Ukrainian SSR (1932)
- From the results of colonization policy in the USSR (1936)
- National Policy of Soviet in Ukraine (1937)
