= Mykola Stasyuk =

Mykola Stasyuk (Ukrainian: Микола Стасюк) was a Ukrainian political and public figure from Katerynoslav or its province. He was a member of the first government of Ukraine as its Agriculture Minister and he was a member of the Central Council of Ukraine, prominent cooperator, writer, and memoirist, a chairman of the Ukrainian Peasants Union.

Some sources write his name as Mykola Mykolayovych Stasyuk (Tetyana Ostashko in Handbook on History of Ukraine), others - Mykola Mykhailovych Stasyuk (Mykola Chaban).

== Biography ==
Officially, Mykola Stasyuk was born into a family of serviceman from Yekaterinoslav Governorate. Mykola Chaban, however, found some information about a student Nikolai Mikhailovich Stasyukov at the Saint Petersburg Mining Institute, which is very similar with biography of the Ukrainian minister Mykola Stasyuk.

According to Chaban, Stasyukov was born on 16 May 1885 in Yekaterinoslav. His father nobleman Mikhail Stefanovich Stasyukov was a veterinary doctor. His mother was called Yekaterina Naumovna Konoplia. Both of them were eastern Orthodox Christians. The boy was baptized on 23 May 1885 at Holy Trinity Church in Yekaterinoslav. The date of Stasyuk birth noted at the Petersburg archives was confirmed by the state archives documents of Dnipropetrovsk Oblast where survived metric books for the 1885th year. Mother of Stasyuk was one of the first female doctors in the region, his father owned a brick factory, his uncle worked at administration of the Yekaterina Railways with Adrian Kashchenko.

On 24 August 1894 Stasyuk entered the Katerynoslav realschule from which he graduated on 5 June 1901, finishing a complete course of studies at the school general department. From 18 August 1901 to 5 June 1902 Stasyuk took additional class at the school. Remarkable is that his father also graduated the school 20 years before him. As historical outline of the realschule testifies, Mikhail Stasyukov graduated from the general department in 1882 and in 1883, next year, he finished the additional seventh class of chemistry-technological department.
