= Moisei Rafes =

Ukrainian-Soviet Jewish politician and Bundist

- משה רפס
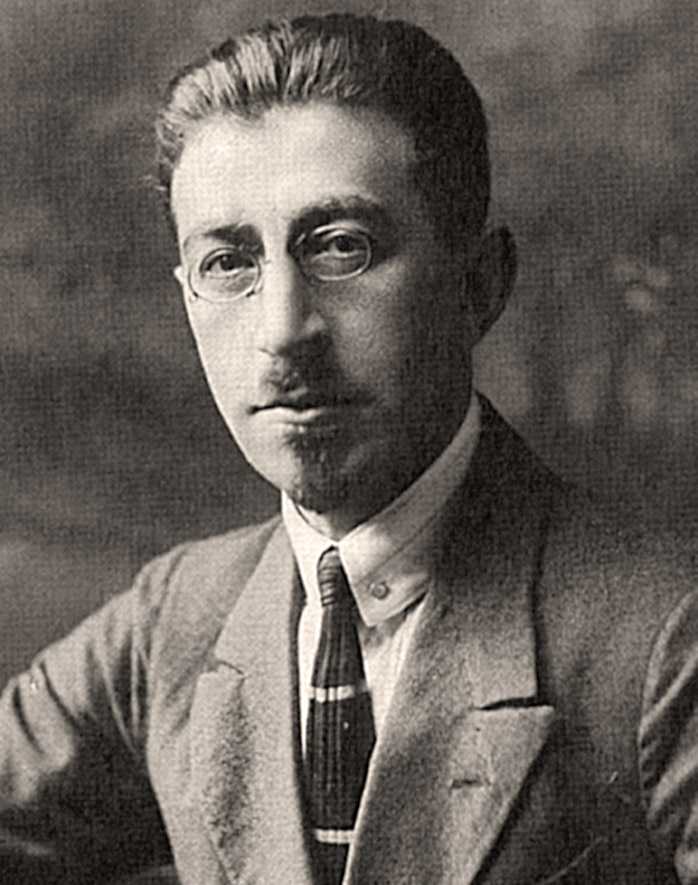
- Rafes c. 1920s

General Controller of Ukraine
- In office 13 July 1917 – 14 August 1917
- President: Mykhailo Hrushevsky (speaker of the Central Rada)
- Preceded by: Position created
- Succeeded by: Aleksandr Zarubin

Personal details
- Born: 3 November 1883 Vilnius, Russian Empire (now Lithuania)
- Died: 1942 (aged 58–59) Komi ASSR, Russian SFSR, Soviet Union (now Russia)
- Party: Kombund (from 1919)
- Other political affiliations: RSDLP (1907–1919); Jewish Labour Bund (1910–1919)

Moisei Rafes (Note: Yiddish: משה רפס, Moishe Rafes Ukrainian: Мойсей Григорович Рафес, Moysey Hryhorovych Rafes) (3 November 1883 – 1942) was a prominent Jewish politician of the Ukrainian People's Republic as the Bundist representative. After 1919 he was an official of the Bolshevik Party until the rise of Joseph Stalin, when he was imprisoned.

Rafes was a member of the Central Council of Ukraine and the Petrograd Soviet, as well as an unsuccessful candidate for the 1917 Russian Constituent Assembly. He headed Jewish Bund in Kiev. In Kiev Rafes became a member of the Regional Committee in Protection of Revolution in Ukraine and served as the General Controller of the General Secretariat of Ukraine. He was succeeded at this post by another Bundist, Aleksandr Zolotarev.

When tensions within the Bund heightened, due to the pro-Bolshevik leaning of a part of the leadership, Moisei Rafes was the leader of the centrist wing of the Bund, while Mikhail Liber and Benjamin Kheifetz led the rightists.

However, Rafes led the scissionist Kombund group in Kiev in February 1919, later joined by similar groups in Yekaterinoslav, Kharkov and Poltava, but the Kombund lasted only till May 1919, when it merged into the Komfarband. These moves were apparently motivated by the large-scale pogroms committed by all the armies present in Ukraine at the time, except the Red Army. After the refusal of the Soviet authorities to authorize the formation of a distinct Jewish Communist Party, Rafes, like other former Bundists Esther Frumkin, Alexander Chemerinsky and Rakhmiel Veinshtain, finally joined the upper echelons of the Yevsektsiya, the Jewish section of the Soviet Communist party (CPSU).

Moisei Rafes was at the head of the artistic section of Sovkino and a member of the Sovkino board in the late 1920s and through 1930.
