= Palace of Governor-General in Kyiv =

- Ukrainian: Палац генерал-губернатора у Києві
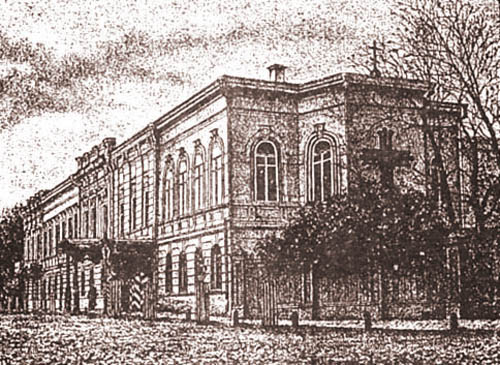
- Interactive map of the Palace of Governor-General in Kyiv area
- Alternative names: Hetman Palace

General information
- Location: Kyiv, Ukraine
- Coordinates: 50°26′44.8″N 30°32′0.5″E

Palace of Governor-General in Kyiv (Ukrainian: Палац генерал-губернатора у Києві, also known as the Hetman Palace), was a former building and an important city landmark in the neighborhood of Lypky in Kyiv that was destroyed by a blast in June 1920. For most of its time it served as the official residence of the Kiev Governor General of Southwestern Krai.

== Historical background ==
The construction date of the building is unknown. It is first mentioned in 1817. The palace was located at the corner of vulytsia Instytutska and vulytsia Levashovska (today Shovkovychna) in the vicinity of today's address numbers 18 and 20. According to the Kyivan historian Theodore-Richard Ernst the building belonged to the Major General Dmitry Begichev. Later the building was owned by Artillery Colonel Andrei Zakharovich Ivanov who land it out for profit. One of his clients was Nikolay Raevsky who stayed in the building in 1821-25. In 1833 Ivanov sold the house to the state treasury for 100,000 rubles.

Since then, the building was used as an official residence. The first resident of the house was Vasiliy Levashov, the first official Governor General. Until 1914 the palace was a residence of the Governor General of Southwestern Krai. Upon liquidation of the position, the building was given to the Kyiv governor in 1915. In January 1918, just before the Bolshevik forces sacked Kiev, Volodymyr Vynnychenko was able to secure the palace after the General Secretariat of Ukraine. However, right after the establishment of the Ukrainian State on April 29, 1918, the house was redesignated as an official residence of the Hetman of Ukraine and after December 14, 1918, belonged to Symon Petliura.

Due to war and political situation, none of the Ukrainian state official stayed in the house for long. In 1919-20 the power in Kyiv changed rapidly with advancement of the Russian forces of White Guard movement and the Liberation forces of Poland. In spring of 1920 Kyiv for a short period (five weeks) was occupied by the Ukrainian allied Polish forces (anti-Bolshevik pact) and the palace was used as an ammo storage. Upon withdrawal the building was blown into pieces. Due to the extent of a damage the building could not be rebuilt and in 1925 a small city park was created in its place.

== Description ==
Blueprints of Vladimir Nikolayev of 1879 give an idea about the facade of the Governor General Palace. Its length constituted 35 m (115 ft), to the right there were a three windows annex with a cast iron porch on columns as a side entrance, while further there were a four windows annex of the Saint Nicholas Dome Church that was built on the funds of the Russian Ministry of Interior. The full length of structure along vulytsia Instytutska amounted to 55 m (180 ft).

A hall of official receptions was located across a significant part of the building. During the times of Trepov it was refurbished with white gilded furniture, while the floor was covered with a white and pink carpet. The Cabinet of the Governor-General and his family rooms were located on the second floor.

The whole mansion was composed of three parts, while a bigger area was occupied by an old orchard which partially was left preserved to our days. The orchid was once a part of the Klov Park. On a corner there was a kitchen side house that was connected with the palace by a stone gallery and other outbuilding (sheds for firewood and ice storage). Separately, via gates towards Instytutska, there was located a household yard with large stables, cartwright, barn, orangery and coachman house. A "stone barn for automobiles" was built in December 1911. Wooden stripped booths for guards stood to the side from the cast iron porch.

== See also ==
- Southwestern Krai

== Bibliography ==
- Tretyak, K.O. Kiev: Travel guide of a ruined city. Ed.2. "Kyivskyi universytet". Kyiv, 2001.
