= Polish Executive Committee in Rus =

Polish representative body in Ukraine

Polish Executive Committee in Rus (Ruthenia) (Polish: Polski Komitet Wykonawczy na Rusi, Ukrainian: Польський комітет виконавчий на Русі, romanized: Polskyi komitet vykonavchyi na Rusi) was a Polish representative body in Ukraine created on 6 March 1917 at the Kiev Congress of Polish Communities on the initiative of NDs (liberals) and the Polish Socialist Association (PSO). Abbreviated as PKW na Rusi, it was headed by Joachim Bartoszewicz. PSO was created on 3–4 March 1917 in Kharkiv headed by T. Żarski.

These political associations, the declared tactic of which was quite contrary, at the same time consisted of different centers of one party. PSO in Kharkiv was created by former members of the PPS-FR and also included representatives of the PPS-L and the SDKPiL, while Kiev members of the PPS-FR led by Kazimierz Domosławski were more supportive of the PKW. Despite that none of the centers considered itself representative of the one PPS-FR.

== Background ==
Between March and early July 1917, PKW reacted quite actively to nation-building activity of the Central Council of Ukraine. The appeals of the committee show an anticipating and situational nature of liberals in regards to the Ukrainian question who de facto controlled the committee and for a long time (to July) were able to set aside Polish socialists and democrats that cooperated with PKW from political activity. That position was stipulated by the pro-Russian orientation of the committee and its support of the Russian Provisional Government from one side and from another - the desire of immediate implementation of national self-determination rights for peoples of the Russian Empire.

After the proclamation of the First Universal of the Central Council of Ukraine, PKW left number of socialists and democrats at the following Kiev Congress of Polish Communities on 23 June 1917. Nonetheless, on 30 June 1917 PKW, in its appeal to the Central Council, indicated that "the Congress of Polish organizations in Ruthenia warmly welcomes the aspirations of the fraternal Ukrainian nation to political liberation and declares that the Poles, who are considered an indigenous citizens of the land, are ready to work together in laying the foundations of the Ukrainian nation own existence with ensuring the rights of the Polish national minority in Ukraine".

Among the former members of PKW was the Polish Democratic Central (Polska Centrala Demokratyczna, leader - Jevgeniusz Straczewski and S.Stempowski) which was a block of four democratic parties in Ukraine, and the conservative Party of National Labor (Stronnictwo Pracy Narodowej, leader - Janusz Radziwill, Waclaw Grzybowski, and Stanislaw Horwatt). Among the most prominent politicians of the Democratic Central was Meczyslaw Mickiewicz.

In support of the democrats and number of socialists who left PKW Domoslawski declared that his party, PPS-FR, recognizes PKW as an excess organization, because it is a simple block of bourgeoisie. However soon PKW went into opposition to the Central Council of Ukraine when the last adopted the declaration of the Russian Provisional Government for Ukraine on 3 July 1917 and allowed other Polish parties to join its ranks.
