= Mieczysław Mickiewicz =

Ukrainian politician (1879–1939)

Mieczysław Mickiewicz Мєчіслав Міцкєвіч

Deputy Secretary of Foreign Affairs (Polish Affairs)
- In office June 28, 1917 – January 30, 1918
- President: Mykhailo Hrushevsky (speaker of Central Rada)
- Preceded by: position created
- Succeeded by: position disbanded

Personal details
- Born: February 26, 1879 Kamianets-Podilsky, Podolia Governorate
- Died: 1939 (aged 59–60)
- Party: Polish Democratic Centrist party Polski Komitet Wykonawczy
- Occupation: Politician, statesman

Mieczysław Mickiewicz (1879 – before 1939) was a Ukrainian politician and lawyer of Polish descent, later a statesman of the Second Polish Republic.

== Early life ==
Mickiewicz was born on 26 February 1879 in Kamianets-Podilsky, which was then part of the Podolia Governorate of the Russian Empire. He attended secondary school in his native Kamianets-Podilsky, before studying law at a university in Kyiv and later in Odesa. He then practiced law within the city of Kyiv.

== Political career ==
Mickiewicz was a member of Polish Democratic Centrist party.

In 1917, he became a member of the Polish Executive Committee of the Assembly of Polish Organizations (PKW) in the Russian Empire and was also part of the Board of the Polish Central Committee. He was then appointed undersecretary of Polish affairs in the General Secretariat of the Central Rada.

After the proclamation of the Ukrainian People's Republic (also known as the Ukrainian National Republic), headed by Volodymyr Vynnychenko, he was chosen as Minister of Polish Affairs, of which he served as in several cabinets in 1917/1918. From February 22, 1922, until February 1, 1923, he was the voivode of Volhynian Voivodeship, Poland. He also oversaw the 1922 Polish parliamentary election within the Volhynian Voivodeship, as its voivode, in which he reported to the government that Volhynia voted overwhelmingly for Ukrainian lists and not Polish ones, as by that time Volhynia was a majority Ukrainian. This came as a shock to the dominant Polish nationalist party, National Democracy, who believed that the Ukrainians could be swayed by the Polish administration to vote for Polish-backed candidates in assimilate.

Predecessor; Tadeusz Dworakowski	Volhynian Voivode; 1922–1923	Successor; Stanisław Srokowski
