= Aleksandr Zarubin =

Aleksandr N. Zarubin Александр H. Зарубин

Controller
- In office 18 August 1917 – 20 November 1917
- Prime Minister: Volodymyr Vynnychenko
- Preceded by: Moisei Rafes
- Succeeded by: Aleksandr Zolotarev

Secretary of Post and Telegraph
- In office July 1917 – 20 November 1917
- Prime Minister: Volodymyr Vynnychenko
- Preceded by: position created
- Succeeded by: Mykyta Shapoval

Personal details
- Born: Russian Empire
- Party: Socialist-Revolutionary Party
- Occupation: diplomat and statesman

Aleksandr Zarubin (Russian: Александр Зарубин Aleksandr Zarubin) was a Russian politician, statesman, and diplomat.

There is a little or no information of Zarubin. He was a secretary (minister) of the Ukrainian government, however he held a position that was assigned to the Russian minority representative. That was by the request of the Russian Provisional Government that demanded to have several members of Russian political background. Later, after the dismissal of the first government and its reorganization in the next government, Zarubin held two positions. From July until the end of autumn he served as the state controller, beside his secretarial assignment as the secretary of Post and Telegraph services. Zarubin also was elected to the delegation together with Volodymyr Vynnychenko and Ivan Steshenko that was scheduled to meet with the government of Alexander Kerensky on 21 October, which was accusing the Vynnychenko's government in separatism. Later, that meeting was canceled due to the Bolshevik coup-d'etat. Zarubin's further fate is unknown.

== Sources ==
- Encyclopedia of Ukrainian Studies (in 10 volumes), editor Volodymyr Kubiyovych. "Molode Zhyttia" Paris, New-York; 1954—1989.
- Minor dictionary of history of Ukraine, editor Valeriy Smoliy. — "Lybid", Kyiv; 1997.
