= Regional Committee in Protection of Revolution in Ukraine =

Regional Committee in Protection of Revolution in Ukraine (Ukrainian: Крайовий комітет з охорони революції в Україні, romanized: Kraiovyi komitet z okhorony revoliutsii v Ukraini) was a short lived revolutionary organization preceding the Kyiv revolutionary committee of Bolsheviks. It declared itself the supreme authority in Ukraine after the October Revolution. The committee was created on the night November 7-8, 1917 at the closed door session of the Executive Committee of Central Council of Ukraine with representatives of revolutionary organizations of Ukraine. It was dissolved in couple of days and transferred its authority of the General Secretariat of Ukraine.

== Composition ==
The committee consisted of the following representatives from:

- Central Council of Ukraine
- All-Ukrainian Soviet of soldiers deputies
- Ukrainian General Military Committee
- Chief Railway Committee
- National political parties
- Soviets of workers and soldiers deputies of Kiev, Kharkov, Odessa, Yekaterinoslav

List of members: Mykola Porsh (chairman), Oleksandr Sevryuk, Mykola Kovalevsky, Andriy Nikovsky, Fedir Matushevsky, Yuriy Pyatakov, Mykyta Shapoval, Solomon Goldelman, S.Saradzhev, Anatoliy Pisotsky, Symon Petlyura, Mykola Shumytsky, Mykhailo Telezhynsky, Hryhoriy Kasyanenko, Isaak Kreisberg, Volodymyr Zatonsky, Moisei Rafes, Moisei Zilbelfarb.

== Development ==
On November 9, 1917 in its announcement to residents of Ukraine the committee reported that it concentrate functions of central power in its hands and being responsible to the Central Council of Ukraine. The committee created a revolutionary headquarters for organization of military forces and presented a request to the commander of Kiev Military District Mikhail Kvetsinsky that all military units will be subordinated to the orders of the Ukrainian General Military Committee (UHVK), while orders of a commander and district headquarters were controlled by a commissariat of nine people that the committee created. The committee also requested to depose the representative of the Provisional Government Ivan Kiriyenko.

The committee, however, was not able to control the situation. The administration of the Kiev Military District (KVO) refused to recognize the committee and after the fall of the Provisional Government of Russia considered itself the only legitimate power in the city. It rejected the committee's request and arrested its members of commissariat who were sent for negotiations. In order to reach a consensus with the headquarters of KVO, Symon Petlyura personally as the chairman of UHVK arrived for negotiations. The district administration refused any further negotiations with the committee that included bolsheviks.

=== Committee dissolved ===
After the executive committee of Central Council of Ukraine condemned the Petrograd uprising on November 8, 1917 adopting a resolution, next day Bolsheviks left the committee. The same day in support of the Petrograd uprising, they conducted a united session with representatives of soviets, trade unions and military units in the building of Bergogne Theater. The assembly created the Kiev city Bolshevik revolutionary committee in preparation to overthrow the power led by Leonid Pyatakov, brother of Yuri Pyatakov. On November 11, 1917 the members of the new Bolshevik Kiev revolutionary committee were arrested.

In protest against further negotiations with the Kiev Military District, the members of the rest Ukrainian political parties left the regional committee as well. Due to such situation the committee was forced to dissolve and on November 10, 1917 transferred its authority to the General Secretariat of Ukraine.

== See also ==
- Committee for the Salvation of the Homeland and Revolution

== Bibliography ==
- 1917 in Kyiv: chronology of events. Kyiv, 1928
- Ukrainian Central Council: Documents and materials. Vol.1. Kyiv 1996
- Soldatenko, V.F. Ukraine in the revolution times: historical essay-chronicles in four volumes, 1917 (Україна у революційну добу. Рік 1917). "Svitohlyad". Kyiv, 2010.
