= Pavlo Khrystiuk =

Ukrainian historian, journalist, activist, and politician (1890–1941)

- Павло Христюк
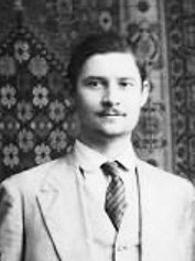
- Khrystiuk in 1917

Chancellor
- In office 15 June 1917 – 14 August 1917
- Prime Minister: Volodymyr Vynnychenko
- Preceded by: Position established
- Succeeded by: Oleksandr Lototsky

Minister of Internal Affairs
- In office 30 January 1918 – February 1918
- Prime Minister: Vsevolod Holubovych
- Preceded by: Volodymyr Vynnychenko
- Succeeded by: Mykhailo Tkachenko

State Secretary
- In office February 1918 – 29 April 1918
- Prime Minister: Vsevolod Holubovych
- Preceded by: Ivan Mirny

Personal details
- Born: 1890 Kuban Oblast, Russian Empire (now Russia)
- Died: 29 September 1941 (aged 60–61) Sevvostlag, Khabarovsk Krai, Russian SFSR, Soviet Union (now Russia)
- Party: Ukrainian Socialist-Revolutionary Party (center)
- Education: Kyiv Polytechnic Institute
- Occupation: cooperator, historian, journalist, political activist, and statesman

Pavlo Onkiiovych Khrystiuk (Ukrainian: Павло Оникійович Христюк; 1890 – 19 September 1941) was a Ukrainian cooperativist, historian, journalist, political activist, and statesman.

== Biography ==
Khrystiuk was born in the Kuban Oblast. He studied in Kyiv Polytechnic Institute as his party co-member, Vsevolod Holubovych. He worked for the newspaper Rada (Council). In 1916-17 he also worked for journal "Komashnia". Later in his career were the socialists-revolutionary newspapers "Borotba" and "Trudova Hromada".

He became a member of the Central Committee of the Ukrainian Socialist-Revolutionary Party (UPSR) and the Villagers Association. Also, he was a member of the Central Rada and the Rada Minor as well as the Pysar (Scribe) in the General Secretariat of Ukraine. He is the co-author of the Land Reform of 31 January 1918.

He was a Minister of the Internal Affairs in the government of Vsevolod Holubovych (1918) and the deputy Minister in the government of Isaak Mazepa (1919). After the IV Party Congress he was among the members of the central current as Mykhailo Hrushevsky.

From 1919 Khrystiuk immigrated to Vienna, where he was a member of the UPSR "foreign delegation" and worked in the magazine "Boritesia-poboryte!". He returned to Ukraine in 1924 and worked for the Association of scientific and technological workers to influence the socialist construction (Kharkiv, 1928-1931). At that time he was also employed for the Chervony Shliakh newspaper along with Pavlo Tychyna. He was the author of the history of revolution in Ukraine as well as numerous other books on the history of Ukraine.

Khrystiuk was arrested on 2 March 1931, as the member of the Ukrainian National Center and was convicted to imprisonment. He died in one of the camps of the Sevvostlag, Khabarovsk Krai.

== Sources ==
- Encyclopedia of Ukrainian Studies (in 10 volumes), editor Volodymyr Kubijovyč. "Molode Zhyttia". Paris, New-York, 1954—1989;
- Minor dictionary of history of Ukraine, editor Valeriy Smoliy. — "Lybid". Kyiv, 1997;
- Padun-Lukyanova, Lesia. Extended name index;
- Surovtsova, Nadia. Recollections. "Olena Teliha Publishing". Kyiv, 1996.
