= Mykola Chaban =

Soviet and Ukrainian journalist (born 1958)

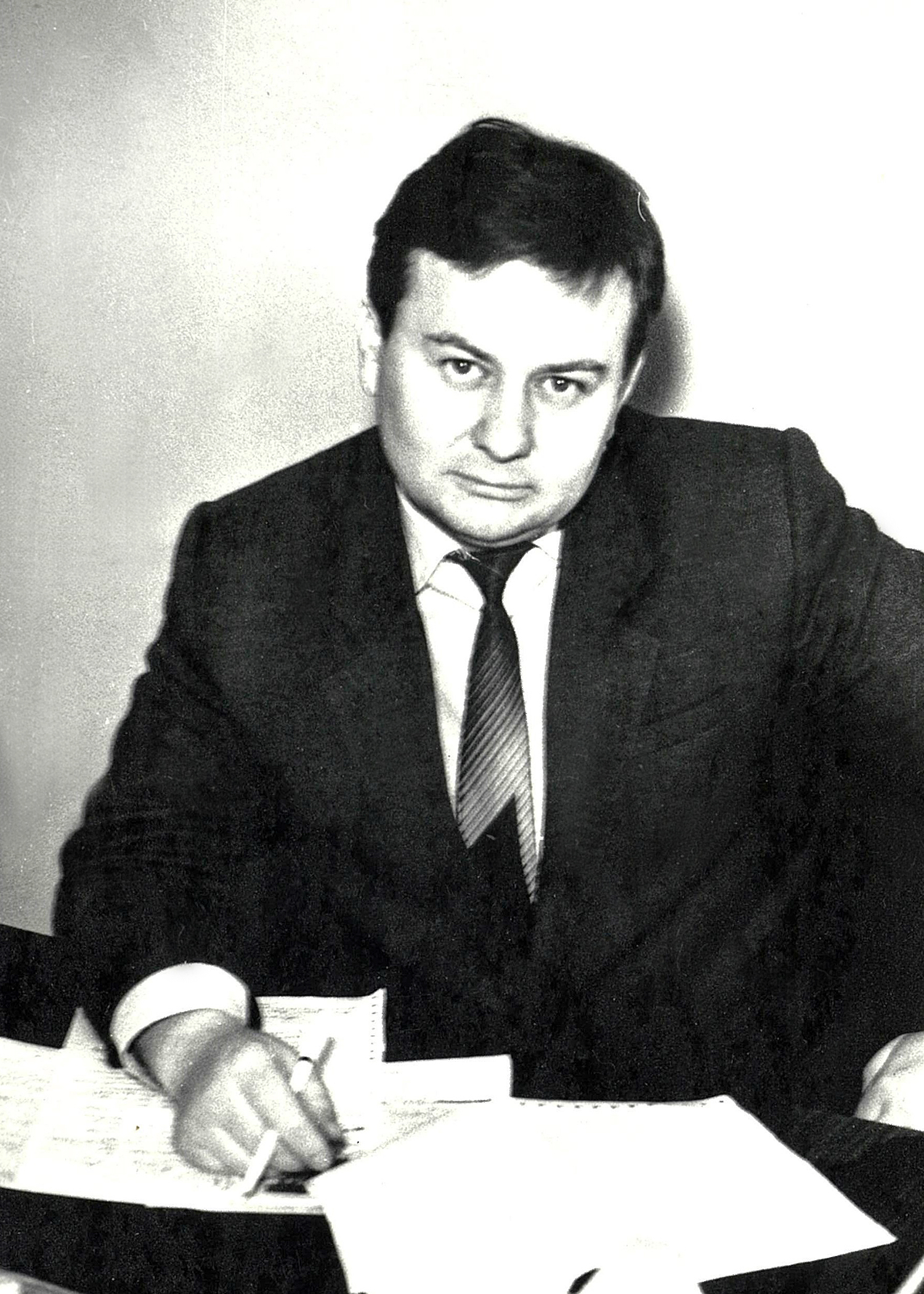
Mykola Chaban

Mykola Chaban (Ukrainian: Микола Петрович Чабан) is a Soviet and Ukrainian journalist, a Ukrainian prose writer, specialist in regional studies of Dnipropetrovsk region. He is a Merited Journalist of Ukraine (2007).

Mykola Chaban was born in Dnipropetrovsk on 5 March 1958. He graduated from the Faculty of Ukrainian Philology at the Dnipropetrovsk State University (specialization - "Ukrainian language and literature"). Since then Chaban worked in newspapers of Dniprodzerzhynsk and Dnipropetrovsk. Currently he works at a Dnipropetrovsk regional newspaper "Zoria" as an editor on cultural issues.

== Membership ==
- National Writers Union of Ukraine
- All-Ukrainian Union of regional researchers
- International Association of Belarusian Studies

== Awards ==
- Valerian Pidmohylny National Writers Union of Ukraine Award (2004)
- Khoroshun Award (1993)
- Dmytro Yavornytsky honorary diploma (1994) for the book "Sicheslav in heart"
- Person of the Year (Dniprodzerzhynsk 1995) as journalist
- Honors of Mayor of Dniprodzerzhynsk (2004) for the book "Journey through old Kamianske"
- Laureate of year by the periodical "Courier of Kryvbas" (1994, 1995)
