= Aleksandr Zolotarev =

Ukrainian-Soviet Jewish politician, statesman, and journalist

- Died: 20 January 1938
- Education: Moscow State University
- Occupations: Politician, Journalist

Aleksandr Zolotarev (1879–1938) was a Ukrainian politician, statesman and journalist.

Zolotaryov was born into a poor Jewish family. He graduated from the law faculty of the Moscow State University. In 1898 for his revolutionary activity Zolotaryov was exiled to Kherson Governorate and later Poltava Governorate. In 1904 he emigrated to Austria-Hungary and returned in 1907. In 1915-17 Zolotarev worked in Moscow. In 1917 he returned to Kiev and became a member of the Central Council of Ukraine from Jewish Bund. Along with it Zolotarev was a member of the Kiev city Duma, All-Ukrainian council of workers' deputies and state controller for the General Secretariat of Ukraine.

In November 1917 Zolotarev was appointed an emissary to Odessa. At the end of 1918 he joined Bolsheviks and became a member of the Council of People's Commissars of Ukraine.

Zolotarev fell victim of the Great Purge. On 25 October 1937 he was arrested and executed on 20 January 1938.

== Bibliography ==
- Zolotarev, A. Iz istoriï Tsentral'noï Ukraïns'koï Rady—1917 (Out of the history of the Central Ukrainian Council) (Kharkiv 1922)
