= Ukrainian Women's Union (Kyiv) =

The Ukrainian Women's Union, was a women's organization in Ukraine, founded in 1917.

Political organizations were allowed in Russian controlled Ukraine in 1905, and Ukrainian women participated in the first women's congress in Russian 1908. After the Russian Revolution, an independent women's movement was founded in Ukraine. The Ukrainian Women's Union was founded by Vira Nechaivska in Stanislavov in 21 March in Kyiv in 1917. It arranged the first women's conference in Ukraine in September 1917.

When Ukraine became a part of the Soviet Union, the newly founded Ukrainian movement was replaced by the local Ukrainian women's chapter of the Zhenotdel.
