= Mykhailo Tkachenko =

Ukrainian Painter (1860-1916)

Mykhailo Stepanovych Tkachenko
- Михайло Ткаченко
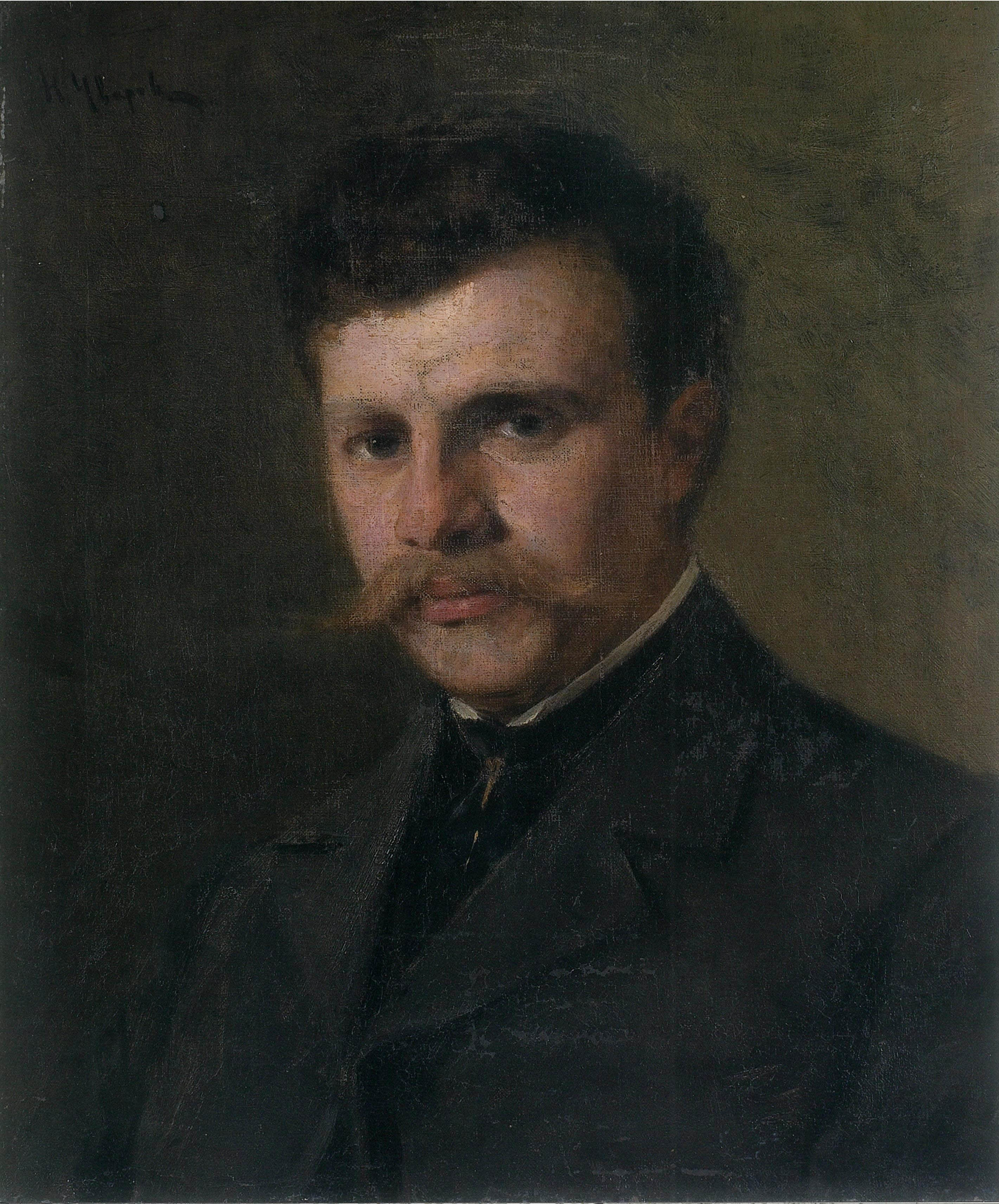
- Portrait of Mykhailo Tkachenko
- Born: 18 November 1860; Kharkiv, Russian Empire
- Died: 2 January 1916 (aged 55); Sloviansk, Yekaterinoslav Governorate
- Known for: Landscapes, seascapes
- Movement: Impressionism
- Awards: Knight of the Legion of Honour

Mykhailo Stepanovych Tkachenko (18 November 1860, Kharkiv, Russian Empire — 2 January 1916, Sloviansk, Yekaterinoslav Governorate, Russian Empire) was a Ukrainian painter who painted in an Impressionist style with a Ukrainian flavor.

== Biography ==
HTkachenkoe studied art under Dmytro Bezperchy. In 1879 he studied under Pavel Chistyakov at the Imperial Academy of Arts in St. Petersburg, and between 1888 and 1892 under Fernand Cormon at the Académie des Beaux-Arts in Paris. He exhibited in a solo exhibition in Paris in 1906.

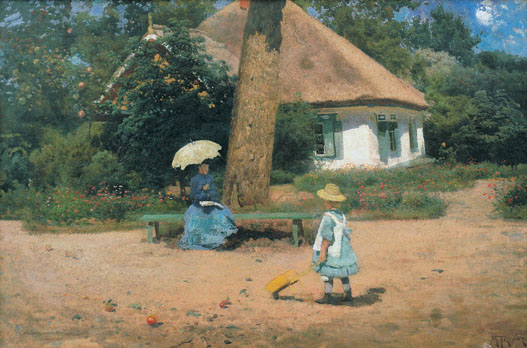
Family at rest

Tkachenko was regarded as one of the great Impressionist painters of pre-WWI Paris. His works took inspiration from his native Ukraine.

While living in Paris, he visited his homeland on an annual basis. His last visit was in 1915, when he was involved with the restoration of frescoes at the Sviatohirsk Lavra monastery. While underaking the work, he became ill and died. Tkachenko was buried in Kharkiv.

Tkachenko's works are held in museums in Kharkiv, Lviv, St. Petersburg, Paris, Liège, and Toulon.
