= Central Rada =

Legislature of the Ukrainian People's Republic

Coordinates: 50°26′41″N 30°30′49″E

Central Rada Українська Центральна Рада
- Ukrainian People's Republic

Type
- Type: Unicameral

History
- Founded: 4 March 1917
- Disbanded: 29 April 1918
- Succeeded by: Constituent Assembly (proposed); Labour Congress (de facto); Verkhovna Rada (1992)

Leadership
- Chairman: Mykhailo Hrushevsky
- Seats: 822 (July 1917)

Elections
- Last election: April 1918

Meeting place
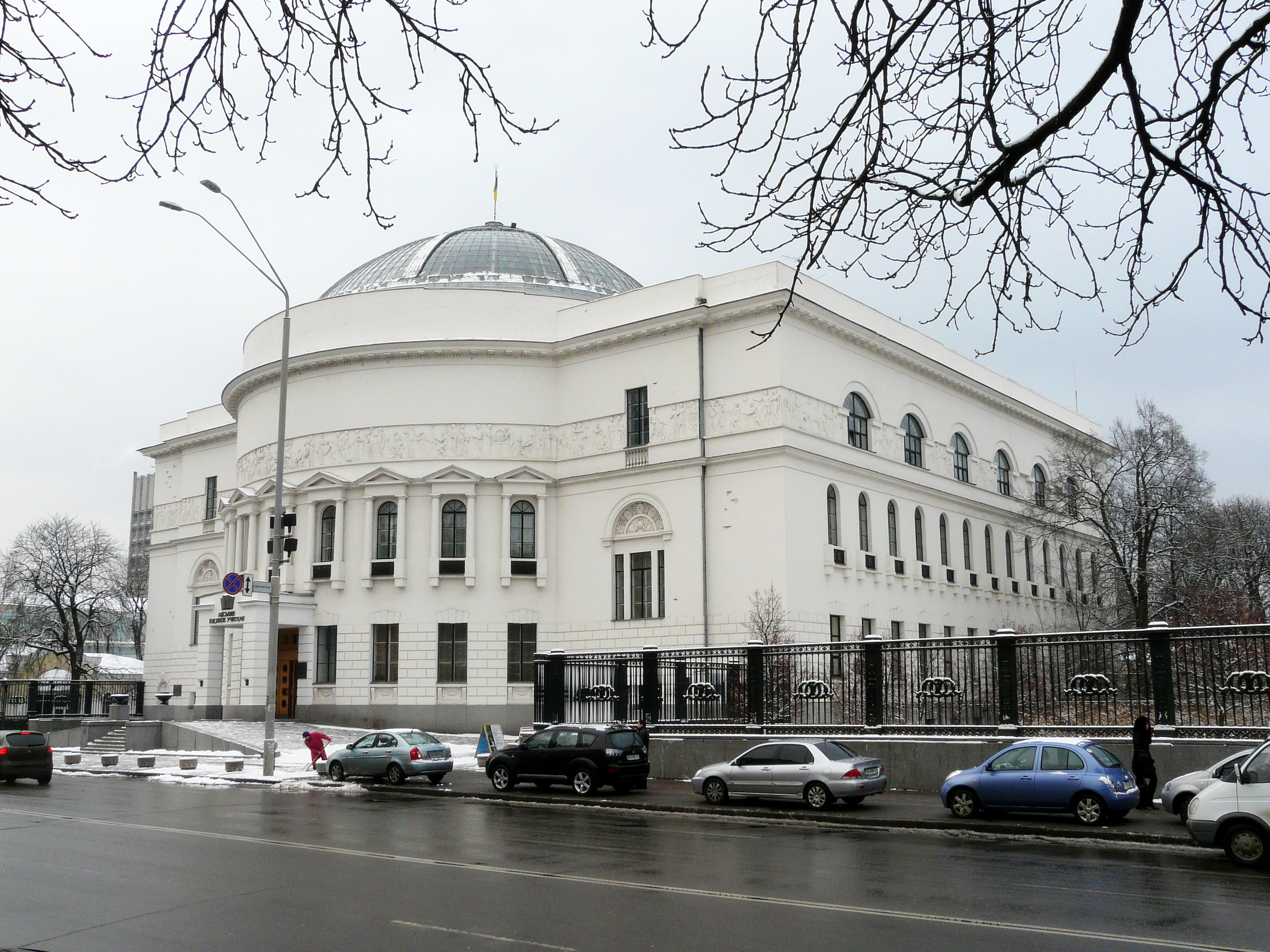
- Ukrainian Club Building, Kyiv

The Central Rada of Ukraine, also called the Central Council (Ukrainian: Українська Центральна Рада, romanized: Ukrainska Tsentralna Rada), was the All-Ukrainian council that united deputies of soldiers, workers, and peasants deputies as well as few members of political, public, cultural and professional organizations of the Ukrainian People's Republic. After the All-Ukrainian National Congress (19–21 April 1917), the Council became the revolutionary parliament in the interbellum lasting until the Ukrainian-Soviet War. Unlike with many other councils in the Russian Republic, Bolshevization of the Rada failed completely, prompting the Ukrainian Bolsheviks to form a rival government in Kharkiv.

== Overview ==
From its beginning the council directed the Ukrainian national movement and with its four Universals led the country from autonomy to full sovereignty. During its brief existence from 1917 to 1918, the Central Rada, which was headed by the Ukrainian historian and ethnologist Mykhailo Hrushevsky, evolved into the fundamental governing institution of the Ukrainian People's Republic and set precedents in parliamentary democracy and national independence that formed the basis of an independent Ukrainian identity after the dissolution of the Soviet Union.

During the Soviet era, official ideology described the Central Council as a counter-revolutionary body of the bourgeoisie and petty-bourgeois nationalist parties.

== Establishment ==
=== All-Ukrainian National Congress and the Proclamation ===
Among the first in Kyiv who learned about the February events outcome in Petrograd was Maksym Synytskyi, director of the Rodyna Club (Family club, previously as Ukrainian Club). Already at night on 14 March [O.S. 1 March] 1917 Starytskyi shared information about the events with Vasyl Koroliv-Staryi and later with all his acquaintances and friends from the Rodyna Club, the Society of Ukrainian Progressionists (TUP), "Chas" (Time) publishing. Synytskyi's idea laid in necessity of establishment of the Ukrainian movement leadership center not to repeat the same mistakes that took place during the events of 1905–07. Already at night on March 1, there took place a gathering of only 27 members of the Society of Ukrainian Progressionists in the Chykalenko's building. The meeting decided not to rush with actions and conduct regular daily meetings of the society at the Rodyna Club building.

Already on 16 March [O.S. 3 March] 1917 in the Rodyna Club building gathered over 100 representatives of Kyiv and some provincial Ukrainian organizations where appeared the idea of establishment of the Central Council. The Central Council was formed on parity foundations between separate Ukrainian organizations. Dmytro Antonovych was recalling that they could not find a mutual understanding with TUP, but agreed to create provisional Central Council with a nucleus of no more than 25 members with an option to add more primarily with delegates outside of Kyiv. The core of the provisional Central Council consisted of five representatives from each TUP, workers, academic youth, and cooperatives as well as two representatives of Social-Democratic Party. The main task of the provisional Central Council was to call on the All-Ukrainian National Congress that was supposed to adopt the Central Council as a permanent Ukrainian parliament.

The Ukrainian diaspora historian Arkadiy Zhukovsky in his article on the Central Council in Encyclopedia of Ukraine states that the council was founded in Kyiv on 17 March [O.S. 4 March] 1917 at the initiative of the Society of Ukrainian Progressionists and with the participation of various Ukrainian political parties, Ukrainian military activists, workers, religious activists, students, entrepreneurs, public and cultural organizations such as the Ukrainian Science Society, the Ukrainian Pedagogic Society, the Society of Ukrainian Technicians and Agriculturists, etc. That day the Central Council informed by a telegram the Russian Provisional Government that was just created about its establishment.

On 20 March [O.S. 7 March] 1917 there took place elections of the Central Council leadership. Mykhailo Hrushevsky was elected as the Head of the Rada, while Dmytro Doroshenko representing TUP and Dmytro Antonovych representing Social-Democrats were appointed as his deputies, also there was elected a scribe (secretary) Serhiy Veselovskyi representing Society of Ukrainian Technicians and Agriculturists and a treasurer. In announcement of newspaper "Visti z Ukrainskoi Tsentralnoi Rady" (Heralds from Ukrainian Central Council) of March 19 it mentioned creation of the Rada on March 7 and outlined its first institutions: Presidium (the Council chairman, two deputies, a scribe and a treasurer) and nine Commissions. In March protocols of the Council is also mentioned an administration (uprava), but not indicated neither its composition, rights or functions.

Proclamation of the Ukrainian Central Council to Ukrainian people

Ukrainian Nation!

Age bonds have fallen. The freedom has come to all the oppressed people, to all the enslaved nations of Russia.

The time has come for Your will and awakening to a new, free, creative life, after more than two hundred years of sleep.

For the first time, Ukrainian Nation of thirty-five million, you will be able to say for yourself who you are and how you want to live as a separate nation. From now on, in a friendly family of free peoples, you will begin to forge a better destiny for yourself with a powerful hand.

The tsarist government fell, and the Provisional Government announced that it would soon convene a Constituent Assembly (Uchreditelnoe Sobranie) on the basis of universal, equal, direct and secret suffrage.

From there, for the first time in the whole world, Your true voice, Your true will, will be heard in all its power.

Until then, we urge you to calmly but firmly demand from the new government all the rights that naturally belong to you and that you must have. The Great Nation, you are the only master of the Ukrainian land.

And in the near future the right to establish the native language in all schools, from lower to higher in the courts and all government institutions. With the same calm, but resolute, seek you, the Nation, the same right for the Ukrainian language from the pastors of the church, zemstvos and all non-governmental institutions in Ukraine.

Ukrainian Nation!

Peasants, workers, soldiers, townspeople, clergy and all Ukrainian intelligentsia!

Keep calm: do not allow yourself any actions to ruin order of everyday life, but together, sincerely and stubbornly set yourself to work: to unite in political societies, cultural and economic unions, raise money for the Ukrainian National Fund and choose your Ukrainian people, to all positions, Get organized!

Only by uniting, you can well know all your needs, resolutely declare them and create a better destiny in its own Land.

Ukrainian Nation!

Before You is the path to a new life.

Boldly, unanimously go on that great path in the name of your happiness and the happiness of future generations of the Mother of Ukraine, create your new free life with a powerful hand.

Ukrainian Central Council. Kyiv, year 1917, March 9.

Народе Український!

Впали вікові пута. Прийшла воля всьому пригніченому людові, всім поневоленим націям Росії.

Настав час і Твоєї волі й пробудження до нового, вільного, творчого життя, після більш як двохсотлітнього сну.

Уперше, Український тридцятипятиміліонний Народе, Ти будеш мати змогу сам за себе сказати, хто Ти і як хочеш жити, як окрема нація. З цього часу в дружній сім'ї вільних народів могутньою рукою зачнеш сам собі кувати кращу долю.

Впав царський уряд, а тимчасовий оголосив, що незабаром скличе Установчі Збори (Учредительное Собраніе) на основі загального, рівного, прямого й таємного виборчого права.

Звідти уперше на весь світ пролунає у всій своїй силі справжній голос Твій, справжня воля Твоя.

До того ж часу ми закликаємо спокійно, але рішуче домагатися від нового уряду всіх прав, які тобі природно належать, і які Ти повинен мати. Великий Народе, сам хазяїн на Українській землі.

А в найблизшім часі права на заведення рідної мови по всіх школах, од нижчих до вищих по судах і всіх урядових інституціях. З таким же спокоєм, але рішуче, домагайся, Народе, того ж права для української мови від пастирів церкви, земств і всіх неурядових інституцій на Україні.

Народе Український!

Селяни, робітники, салдати, городяне, духовенство і вся українська інтелігенція!

Додержуйте спокій: не дозволяйте собі ніяких вчинків, що руйнують лад в житті, але разом, щиро й уперто беріться до роботи: до гуртовання в політичні товариства, культурні і економічні спілки, складайте гроші на Український Національний Фонд і вибірайте своїх українських людей, на всі місця – Організуйтесь!

Тільки згуртувавшись, можна добре пізнати всі свої потреби, рішуче за них заявити і створити кращу долю на своїй Землі.

Народе Український!

Перед Тобою шлях до нового життя.

Сміливо ж, одностайно йди на той великий шлях в ім’я щастя свого і щастя будучих поколінь Матері України, могутньою рукою твори своє нове вільне життя.

Українська Центральна Рада. Київ, року 1917, березня 9.

On 22 March [O.S. 9 March] 1917 the Rada published its first declaration - To the Ukrainian people - in support of the Russian Constituent Assembly. On 26 March [O.S. 13 March] 1917 Mykhailo Hrushevsky returned to Kyiv from exile, but because of the accident on the train he traveled he was not able to attend the Central Council meetings right away. For the first time, Hrushevsky presides over a meeting of the Central Council on 28 March [O.S. 15 March] 1917. With his return, many associated hopes for an end to contradictions and the unification of democratic forces. At the meeting it was decided to raise the national flag over the Kyiv city duma in place where used to be the Tsarist's monogram. Volodymyr Naumenko was elected a deputy chairman of the Central Council. There also was a discussion about plans for the April 1 Ukrainian manifestation in Kyiv. Also the Central Council agitation commission was instructed to prepare in two days a draft for the All-Ukrainian National Congress.

However, straight after the convocation of the All-Ukrainian National Congress on 19–21 April [O.S. 6–8 April] 1917, the Rada transformed from a provisional organizational council into a parliament that consisted of 150 members elected from the Ukrainian political parties, professional and cultural organizations and delegates from the guberniyas. During the National Congress Hrushevsky was reelected as the chairman of the Rada, while the leaders of the most popular political parties Serhiy Yefremov and Volodymyr Vynnychenko were appointed as his deputies. As the Central Rada had a Ukrainian national-cultural outlook, it often faced opposition from Russian (both conservative and socialist) and Jewish sectors, representing urban populations. The Central Rada, whilst led by the Ukrainian liberal progressives, included Ukrainian moderates, social democrats (including a small contingent of Bolsheviks) and socialist-revolutionaries. On 23 April [O.S. 10 April] 1917 the Central Council General Assembly adopted the "Order to the Ukrainian Central Council" ("Nakaz") that became de facto its first bylaws. According to democratic organizational principles, the higher body of the Central Council was defined its General Assembly. In the "Nakaz" of April 23 it was mentioned that it "determines direction and nature of all work of the Central Council". The regular meetings of General Assembly had to be convened not less often than once a month, yet in case of urgent need could be convened emergency meetings which considered valid with any number of attendees. Throughout the whole period of the Central Council existence, there took place nine meetings of the General Assembly.

Prior to the First Ukrainian Universal the Central Rada was increased by 130 representatives that were delegated by the II Military Congress (June 23, 1917) and 133 members of the Peasants' Deputies Council who were elected at the I All-Ukrainian Peasants' Congress (June 15, 1917). In July 1917 Russian and Jewish parties joined the Central Rada, expanding the non-Ukrainian membership significantly.

=== Central Council General Assemblies ===
The first Central Council General Assembly took place on 21 April [O.S. 8 April] 1917, the final day of the All-Ukrainian National Congress. The meeting checked and approved the list of the Central Council members elected by the congress and formed an executive body, the Central Council Committee.

The second Central Council General Assembly (5–6 May [O.S. 22–23 April] 1917) reviewed the issue of Ukrainization of military and adopted the first legal document of the Central Council, the earlier mentioned "Nakaz".

The third Central Council General Assembly (20–22 May [O.S. 7–9 May] 1917) concentrated on the issue of relationships with the Russian Provisional Government and sending of a plenipotentiary delegation to Petrograd in order to resolve the issue about the right of Ukrainian people for their national territorial autonomy.

The fourth Central Council General Assembly (14–16 June [O.S. 1–3 June] 1917) listened to the report of Volodymyr Vynnychenko about the diplomatic mission of the Council's delegation to Petrograd, about denial by the Russian Provisional Government the autonomy demands. The meeting adopted to appeal to Ukrainian people with a call "immediate laying of the foundations of the autonomous system in Ukraine". That resolution became an important basis for the proclamation of the First Universal of the Ukrainian Central Council.

The fifth Central Council General Assembly (2–14 July [O.S. 20 June – 1 July] 1917) approved creation of the General Secretariat and its first declaration, adopted number of resolutions that concerned the Central Council reorganization by adding representatives of national minorities who lived in Ukraine. The Assembly decided to convene in Kyiv the congress of peoples of Russia who were seeking a federal system of the country, amended the Central Council Committee statute by expanding its rights and number of members, discussed the course of negotiations of the Central Council leadership with the Russian Provisional Government delegation in Kyiv, adopted the Second Universal of the Ukrainian Central Council.

The sixth Central Council General Assembly (18–19 August [O.S. 5–6 August] 1917) roughly discussed the situation that arose after the refusal of the Provisional Government to approve the "Statute of the Higher Authority of Ukraine" replacing it with the "Provisional Instruction to the General Secretariat of the Provisional Government". At that assembly there was raised the question of convening the Ukrainian Constituent Assembly as well as condemned the initiative of the Provisional Government to carry on the State Conference on 25 August [O.S. 12 August] 1917 in Moscow.

The seventh Central Council General Assembly (11–15 November [O.S. 29 October – 2 November] 1917) paid attention mainly finding a way out of the situation in the country after toppling down of the Provisional Government in Petrograd and the armed incident in Kyiv.

The eighth Central Council General Assembly (25–30 December [O.S. 12–17 December] 1917) debated sharply on issues of peace and land, discussed the course of preparation to the Ukrainian Constituent Assembly elections.

The ninth Central Council General Assembly (28 January – 7 February [O.S. 15–25 January] 1918) approved laws on land and eight-hours workday, made some changes to the law on Ukrainian Constituent Assembly elections, discussed the course of peace talks in Brest-Litovsk, the situation that arose in connection with the Bolshevik offensive and the Arsenal January Uprising, authorized the reorganization of the Minor Council, approved Vsevolod Holubovych on the post of the Council of People's Ministers chairman.

In general, the Ukrainian Central Council General Assembly was built as a parliamentary session from the very beginning copying procedures of the Russian State Duma. The Ukrainian Central Council was divided by party factions that in need formed blocks. They were submitting interpolations (inquiries). There also existed various parliamentary commissions: some on a permanent basis, others – situationally to address any urgent need. During discussions of some complicated issues, there were created conciliatory commissions. As a rule, decisions were made by simple majority of votes. Despite all their high powers, the general assembly appeared to be an inefficient institution. About organic deficiencies of their work testifies number of documents and, in particular, the very session protocols such as outbreaks of political emotions, demagoguery and populism over a constructive policy. Selected sessions were protesting in nature transforming in verbal battles of numerous party factions.

== Central Council Committee (Minor Council) ==
The Mala Rada (also called the Small, Little or Minor Council) was the Central Executive Committee of the Central Rada. It was created in April 1917 and consisted of 19 members: M. Hrushevsky (chairman), S. Yefremov and V. Vynnychenko as deputy chairmen, Baranovsky, Boiko, Zaporozhets, Koval, Kosiv, Connor-Vilinska, Kryzhanovsky, Mirna, Nikovsky, Odynets, Prokopovych, Stasiuk, Starytska-Cherniakhivska, Sadovsky, Chykalenko and Khrystiuk as members. The elected Chairman of the Small Council was Hrushevsky who also held the position in addition to his role as Chairman of the Central Rada. His deputies were Vynnychenko and Yefremov.

All important matters of state were addressed at meetings of the Mala Rada in the first instance and later any legislation were to be ratified in a plenum session of the Central Rada.

== Political proclamations (Universal) ==
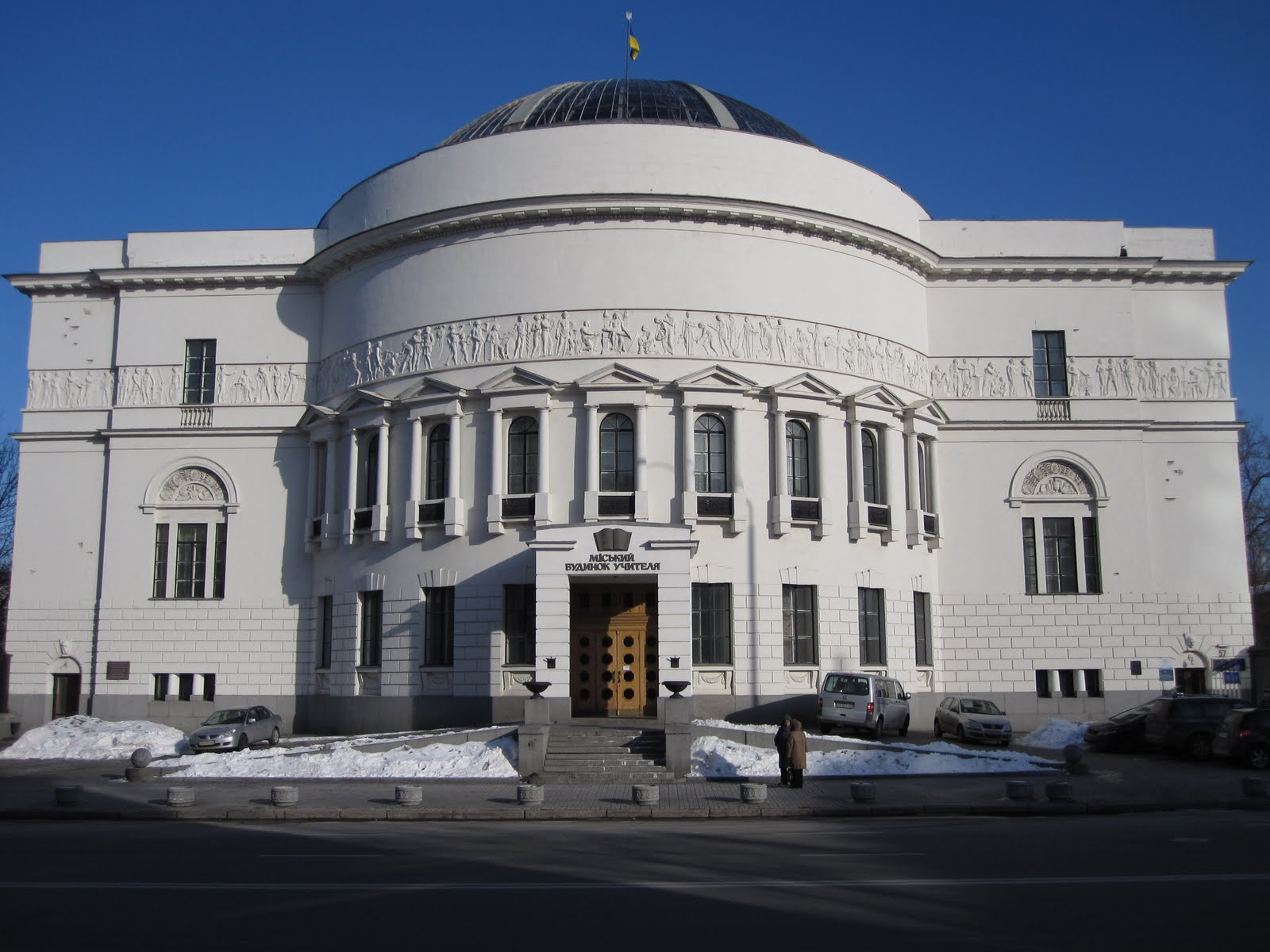
The Ukrainian Club Building, now the Pedagogical Museum, a meeting place of the Little Council

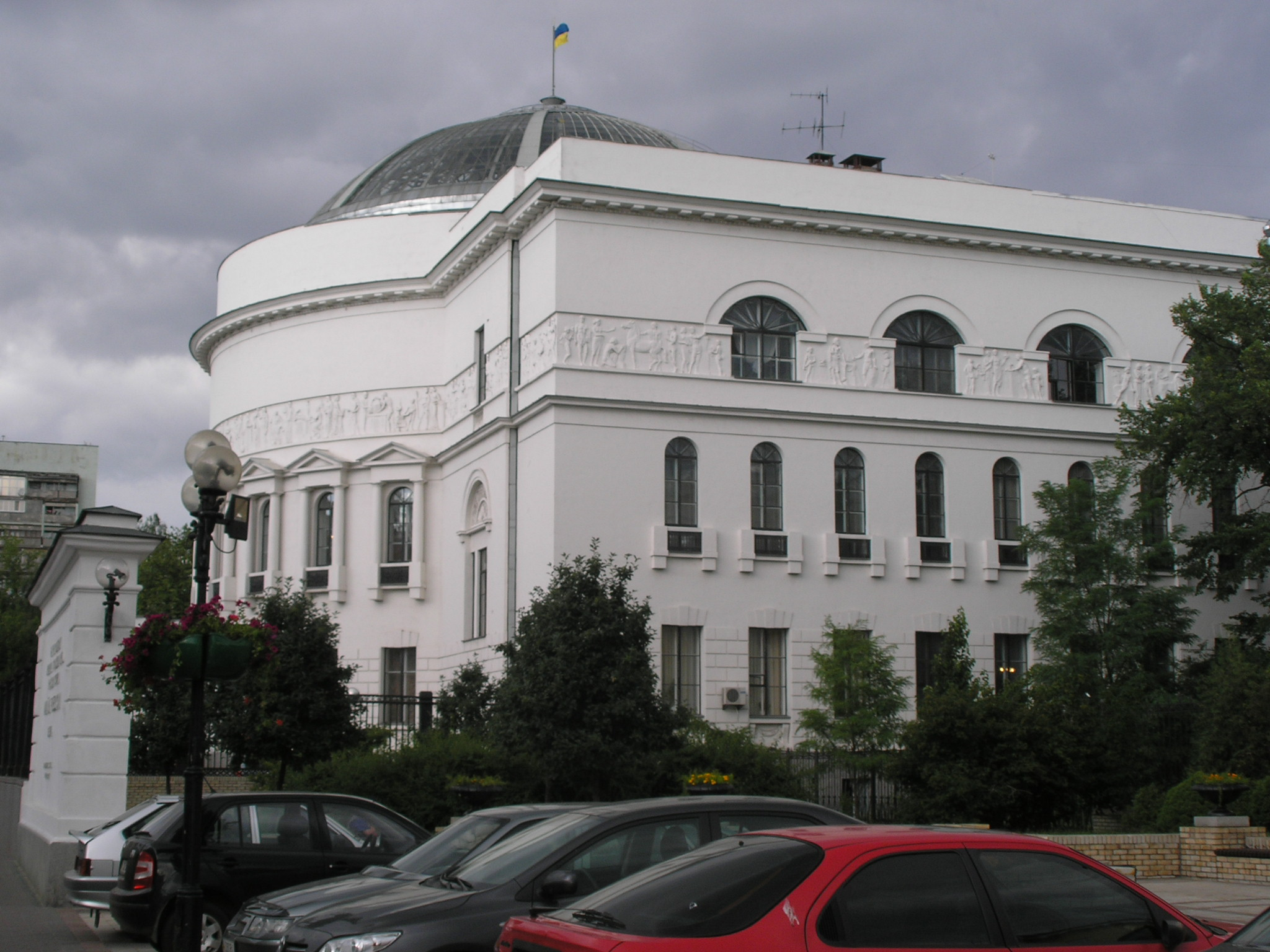
A side view

=== First Universal ===
On 23 June [O.S. 10 June] 1917 the Ukrainian Central Council proclaimed at the second All-Ukrainian military congress its First Universal "To the Ukrainian Nation in Ukraine and beyond its existence". It was a respond of the Ukrainian Central Council to Russian Provisional Government on its negative stance towards the Ukrainian autonomy. According with the First Universal, "without separating from the whole Russia... Ukrainian people must themself manage their lives", laws have to be adopted by the Ukrainian National Assembly. The author of the First Universal was Volodymyr Vynnychenko. Following proclamation of the autonomy, on 28 June [O.S. 15 June] 1917 there was created the General Secretariat.

The main provisions of the First Universal:

1. "From now on we will create our own lives alone". Development of Ukraine "without separating from all of Russia".
2. The Ukrainian Central Council was proclaimed the highest state body in Ukraine.
3. A call for the re-election of the local administration, replacing it with representatives who are committed to the Ukrainian cause.
4. Invitations to national minorities to work together.
5. Convening of the All-Ukrainian Constituent Assembly.
6. Only the All-Ukrainian Constituent Assembly has the right to adopt laws of Ukraine.
7. Introduction of a special tax on personal business.
8. Recognition of the need to develop a law on the distribution of landed estates.

=== Second Universal ===
On 16 July [O.S. 3 July] 1917 the Ukrainian Central Council adopted its Second Universal.

Contents:

1. The Central Council must be enlarged with representatives of other peoples living in Ukraine;
2. The enlarged Central Council creates General Secretariat, composition of which is approved by the Russian Provisional Government;
3. The Central Council begins drafting a law on autonomous establishment of Ukraine that must be approved by the Russian Constituent Assembly. Until the adoption of this law, the Ukrainian Central Council undertakes not to exercise the autonomy of Ukraine;
4. The formation of the Ukrainian army is carried out under the control of the Russian Provisional Government.

The Second Universal was proclaimed at a Ukrainian Central Council session.

=== Third Universal ===
Following the Bolsheviks' coup-d'état (so called October Revolution) in Russia, on 20 November [O.S. 7 November] 1917 the Central Council proclaimed the Ukrainian People's Republic with a determined territory in federal ties with the Russian Republic. Simultaneously, the Central Council adopted a law about elections to the Ukrainian Constituent Assembly and number of other laws. The Central Council was supported by the majority of population in Ukraine as it was shown at elections to the Russian Constituent Assembly on 25 November [O.S. 12 November] 1917 where Ukrainian parties received 75% of votes to Bolsheviks' mere 11%.

Since November, the Bolsheviks had already made several attempts to seize power in Ukraine (see Kiev Bolshevik Uprising). Following another failed uprising in Kyiv, on December 17 the Russian Bolshevik Government (Sovnarkom) announced an ultimatum to the Ukrainian Central Council, which the Central Council rejected. Then the Bolshevik troops began an offensive in Ukraine. Convened in Kyiv on December 17 the Congress of Soviets of Peasants, Soldiers, and Workers Deputies expressed their "full confidence and strong support for the Ukrainian Central Council". The Bolsheviks' Deputies were forced to move to Kharkiv where on December 25 they created an alternative government to the Central Council and General Secretariat, called the People's Secretariat. At the same time, the Central Council sent its delegation to the Peace Conference with the Central Powers in Brest-Litovsk.

=== Fourth Universal ===
The Universal proclaimed the Ukrainian People's Republic, as a "separate, depended on nobody, free, sovereign state of Ukrainian people", an executive body the General Secretariat — Council of People's Ministers.

It changed the regular army with a police force; instructed to carry on elections of peoples' soviets: volosts, county, and local; established monopoly on trade; control over banks; confirmed the law on transfer of land to peasants without redemption taking as a basis the abolition of private property and socialization of land. It instructed the Council of People's Ministers to continue the started negotiations with the Central Powers to the signing of peace; called on all citizens of the Ukrainian People's Republic to fight against Bolsheviks.

Conditions of the Fourth Universal:

1. The Ukrainian People's Republic is pronounced independent, free sovereign state of Ukrainian people;
2. With all its neighbors the Ukrainian People's Republic seeks to live in peace and harmony;
3. Power in Ukraine belongs to the people of Ukraine, the Central Council will rule on behalf of each until the Ukrainian Constituent Assembly convenes;
4. The Bolsheviks' policy that leads to civil war is subjected to harsh criticism;
5. The Ukrainian Central Council commits to fight against the Bolsheviks' collaborationists in Ukraine;
6. The Ukrainian Central Council commits immediately to start peace negotiations with Germany;
7. The Ukrainian Central Council plans to carry on a land reform in interests of peasants;
8. The State has to implement control over trade and banks.

== Members ==
By the end of July 1917 the Central Rada formally had 822 deputies (according to Pavlo Khrystiuk). Its members belonged to the following parties:

- All-Ukrainian Peasants' Deputies Council — 212
- All-Ukrainian Military Deputies Council — 158
- All-Ukrainian Workers' Deputies Council — 100
- Representatives of non-Ukrainian Workers' and Military Deputies Councils — 50
- Ukrainian socialist parties — 20
- Russian socialist parties — 40
- Jewish socialist parties Fareyniktes, Bundists, Poalei Zionists — 35
- Polish Socialist Party and Polish Socialist Party - Left — 15
- Representatives of cities and governorates — 84
- Representatives of professional, educational, economic and public organizations and other national minorities — 108

The Mala Rada was elected out of these 822 deputies with 58 members including 18 members of various national minorities. From the initiative of the Central Rada a congress of Russian nationalities took place in Kyiv on 21–28 September 1917.

== Fate of the Central Council members ==
All members of the council were proclaimed outlaws by the Soviet government of Ukraine in December 1917 as part of a national-bourgeois government. On 29 January 1918 Bolshevist troops entered Kyiv and declared a Soviet Coup d'etat. The Kyiv garrison joined with the Soviets and deposed the Rada. The Bolsheviks established Kharkiv as the capital of the Soviets of the Ukraine.

Exiled

- Volodymyr Vynnychenko, died in France
- Khrystofor Baranovsky, died in Brazil
- Borys Martos, died in the United States
- Moishe Zilberfarb, died in Poland
- Mieczysław Mickiewicz, died in Poland
- Oleksander Lototsky, died in Poland
- Oleksander Shulhyn, died in France
- Ivan Mirny, died in Czechoslovakia
- Mykola Porsh, died in Germany
- Mykola Kovalevsky, died in Austria
- Mykyta Shapoval, died in Czechoslovakia
- Dmytro Antonovych, died in Czechoslovakia
- Nykyfor Hryhoriiv-Nash, died in the United States
- Mykhailo Yeremiiv, died in Switzerland
- Pavlo Zaitsev, died in Germany
- Volodymyr Kedrovsky, died in the United States
- Andri Livytsky, died in Germany
- Dmytro Chyzhevsky, died in Germany
- Yevhen Onatsky, died in Argentina
- Oleksander Slyvynsky, died in Canada
- Levko Chykalenko, died in the United States
- Andri Yakovliv, died in the United States
- Solomon Goldelman, died in Israel
- Kornel (Korni) Nishchemenko, died in the United States
- Viktor Prykhodko, died in the United States (1982)
- Kost Turkalo, died in the United States
- Panas Fedenko, died in Germany
- Dmytro Isayevych, died in Poland
- Metropolitan Ilarion (Ivan Ohienko), died in Canada
- Vyacheslav Prokopovych, died in France
- Fedir Shvets, died in Czechoslovakia
- Valeria O'Connor-Vilinska, died in Czechoslovakia
- Sofia Rusova (Lindfors), died in Czechoslovakia
- Teodor Shteingel, died in Germany
- Yuri Tyshchenko, died in the United States
- Oleksander Salikovsky, died in Poland
- Zinaida Mirna (Khylchevska), died in Czechoslovakia
- Oleksander Vilinsky, died in Czechoslovakia
- Dmytro Doroshenko, died in Germany
- Mykhailo Korchynsky, died in Poland
- Tymish Olesiyuk, died in the United States (1978)

Imprisoned

- Pavlo Khrystiuk, died in Sevvostlag
- Serhiy Yefremov, died in Vladimir city prison
- Valentyn Sadovsky, died in Lukyanivska Prison
- Vsevolod Holubovych, died in Yaroslavl city prison
- Vasyl Mazurenko, died near Almaty
- Illya Shrag, died in Chernihiv (under house arrest)
- Kuzma Korzh, died in Kyiv - shot by Cheka
- Kostyantyn Vasylenko, died in Vinnytsia - shot by Cheka
- Hryhori Holoskevych, died in Tomsk - suicide
- Anatoli Pisotsky, died in Mykolaiv Oblast
- Mykola (Hryhorovych) Levytsky, died in Krasnoyarsky Krai
- Mykola Chechel, died in Suzdal
- Arkadi Stepanenko, died in Kyiv
- Mykola Tkachenko, died in Moscow
- Yuri Tyutyunyk, died in Moscow
- Fedir Kryzhanivsky, died in Kyiv
- Mykhailo Poloz, died at Solovki
- Viktor Poplavko, imprisoned in 1937, executed in 1938
- David Petrovsky, imprisoned in 1937, executed in 1937
- Oleksander Shumsky, died at Solovki
- Mykola Vorony, executed in Odesa
- Yuri Shapoval, died at Solovki
- Ivan Feshchenko-Chopivsky, died in Kozhvinski Raion (Komi Republic)
- Mykola Galagan, died in Lukyanivska Prison
- Maksym Slavinsky, died in Kyiv Oblast NKVD prison #1
- Mykola Lyubynsky, died at Solovki
- Lyudmyla Starytska-Chernyakhivska, died in transit to Kazakhstan
- Mykola Simashkevych, died in Kyiv
- Yevtykhi (Yavtukh) Harmash, died in Poltava
- Antin Drahomyretsky, died in Kharkiv

Assassinated (or killed in action)

- Symon Petliura, killed in Paris (1926)
- Ivan Steshenko, killed in Poltava (1918)
- Oleksander-Bohdan Zarudny, killed in Kyiv (1918)
- Loenard Bochkovsky, killed in Kyiv (1918)
- Ivan Lutsenko, killed near Starokostyantyniv (1919)
- Mykola Mikhnovsky, killed at home (1924)
- Isaak Puhach, killed in Kyiv (1918)

Fate unknown

- Mykola Stasiuk, worked as an editor of a local newspaper in Mariupol during World War II
- Moisei Rafes, died in 1942
- Aleksandr Zarubin
- Mykhailo Savchenko-Bilsky
- Aleksandr Zolotarev
- Zinovi Vysotsky
- Prokip Ponyatenko
- Oleksander Zhukovsky
- Yosyp Mayevsky
- Volodymyr Naumenko, died in Ukraine, shot by Cheka
- Petro Artemenko
- Mykola Herasymenko
- Andriy Nikovsky, was looking for a job in Leningrad before World War II
- Oleksander Stepanenko, died in Siberia in 1924
- Serhi Vikul
- Yevhen Kasianenko
- Oleksander Yanko
- Oleksander Zhukivsky
- Andri Likhnyakevych, emigration
- Antin Postolovsky, emigration
- Pavlo Pohorilko, the archbishop of All Ukraine was arrested in Kharkiv in 1929 — his subsequent fate is unknown.

Died as victims of the Holodomor or of illness

- Myhaylo Tuhan-Baranovsky, 1919 (heart-attack)
- Petro Stebnytsky, 1923 (hunger)
- Mykola Vasylenko, 1935 (illness)
- Viktor Pavlenko, 1932 (hunger)
- Stepan Erastov, 1933 (hunger)
- Mykhailo Hrushevsky, 1934 (medical mistreatment)
- Mykola Bilyashivsky, 1926 (hunger)
- Oleksander Voloshyn, 1933 (hunger)
- Volodymyr Shemet, 1933 (hunger)
- Mykola (Vasylyovych) Levytsky, 1936 (hunger)
- Mykola Shrag, 1970
- Serhi Kolos, 1969
- Lyubov Yanovska (Shcherbachova), 1933
- Fedir Matushevsky, 1919
- Lev Han, 1919 (typhus)
- Andri Viazlov, 1919 (typhus)
- Andriy Dolud, 1976

Other victims and related people

- wife of Mykhailo Hrushevsky, Maria-Ivanna Sylvestrivna Hrushevska (Voyakovska), died soon after was brutally robbed in 1948
- daughter of Mykhailo Hrushevsky, Kateryna Mykhailivna Hrushevska, died in Temlag in 1943 being in custody since 1938
- brother of Mykhailo Hrushevsky, Oleksandr Serhiyovych Hrushevsky, was arrested soon after the death of Mykhailo — his subsequent fate is unknown.
- Arystarkh Ternychenko, was a member of the government (not mentioned as a member of the Central Rada), fate unknown
- Serhii Ostapenko, was a member of the government (not mentioned as a member of the Central Rada), fate unknown
- Ovksenti Korchak-Chepurivsky, was a member of the government (not mentioned as a member of the Central Rada), died from natural causes in 1947
- Volodymyr Oskilko, a member of the opposition to the Martos government (not mentioned as a member of the Central Rada), assassinated by Cheka in 1926
- Isaak Mazepa, was a member of the government (not mentioned as a member of the Central Rada), died in Germany

== See also ==
- Verkhovna Rada
- Cabinet of Ministers of Ukraine
- Regional Committee in Protection of Revolution in Ukraine
- Central Executive Committee of Ukraine
- 1918 Russia–Ukraine negotiations

== Bibliography ==
- Hrushevsky, Mykhailo (1918). "На порозі нової України" (The first step towards the new Ukraine). Kiev.
- Shulhin, O. (1918). "Політика" (Politics). Kiev.
- Vynnychenko, Volodymyr (1920). "Відродження нації" (Revival of the nation). Vol I-II. Vienna.
- Khrystiuk, Pavlo (1921). "Записки і матеріали до історії української революції 1917—1920 pp." (Notes and materials to the history of the Ukrainian Revolution 1917-20). Vol I-II. Vienna.
- Zolotariov, A. (1922). "Із історії Української Центральної Ради" (From history of the Ukrainian Central Rada). Kharkov.
- Skrypnyk, M. (1923). "Начерк історії пролетарської революції на Україні" (Outline of history of the proletarian revolution in Ukraine). Chervonyi Shliakh (Red Pathway). Kharkov.
- Richytskyi, A (1928). "Центральна Рада від лютого до жовтня" (The Central Rada from February to October). Kharkov.
- Doroshenko Dmytro (1932). "Історія України 1917—1923" (History of Ukraine 1917-23). Vol I "Доба Центральної Ради" (The times of the Central Rada). Uzhhorod.
- Reshetar, J. (1952). "The Ukrainian Revolution 1917—1920". Princeton.
- Pidhainy, О. (1966). "The Formation of the Ukrainian Republic". Toronto — New-York.
- Makhun, Serhii (2005). "1917—1918 роки: Згаяний час Центральної Ради, або «Між двома кріслами»". Dzerkalo Tyzhnia. #32(560) August 20–26. Kiev. The copy of the article. (in Ukrainian)
- Bilokin, Serhiy (2000). "Доля членів Центральної Ради в СССР" (The fate of the Ukrainian Central Rada members in USSR). Vyzvolnyi Shliakh (Liberating Pathway). Vol I. 14-26 pp. The copy of the article. (in Ukrainian)
