= General Secretariat of Ukraine =

Former autonomous Ukrainian executive government of the Russian republic

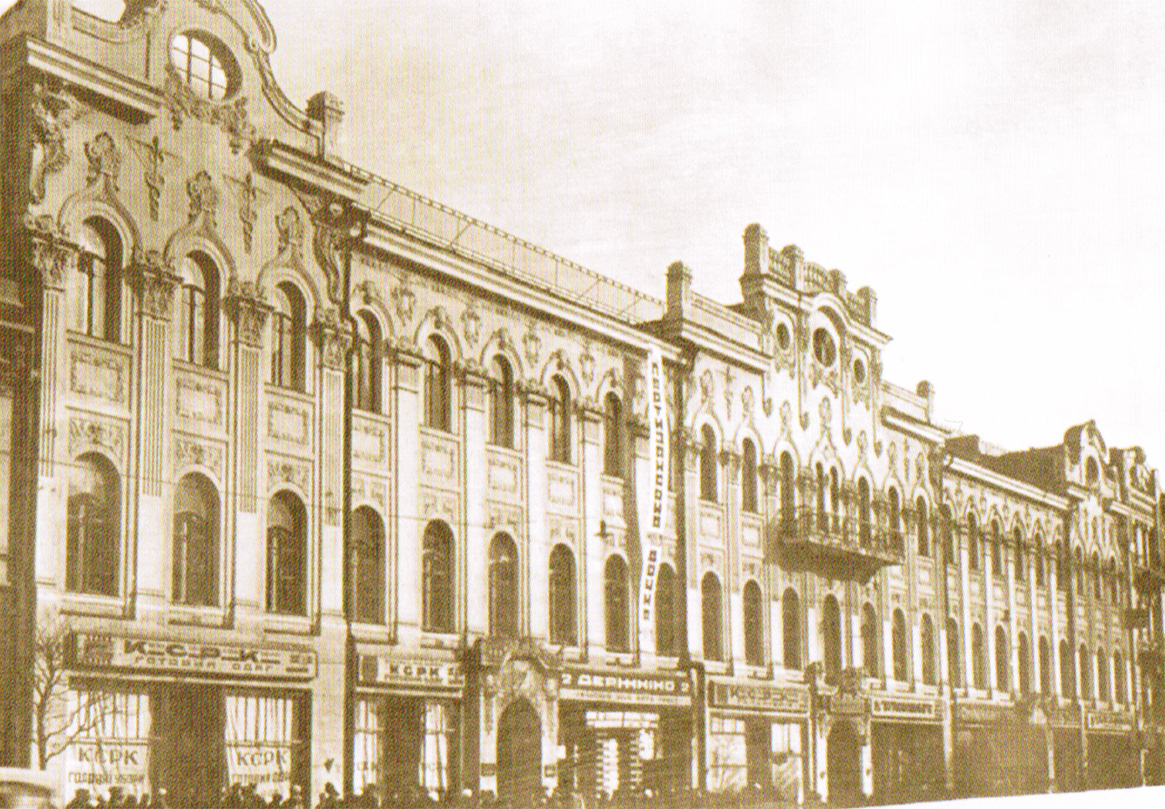
Office building of the secretary of agrarian affairs at 27 Khreshchatyk Street, Kiev. Built in 1910 it was destroyed during World War II.

The General Secretariat of Ukraine (Ukrainian: Генеральний секретаріат УЦР—УНР, romanized: Heneralnyi sekretariat UTsR–UNR) was the autonomous Ukrainian executive government of the Russian Republic from June 28, 1917, to January 22, 1918. For most of its existence it was headed by Volodymyr Vynnychenko.

The secretariat was created after the Central Council of Ukraine accepted a proposal of the Ukrainian Party of Socialist Revolutionaries. According to the Encyclopedia of Ukraine, this event took place five days after the proclamation of the 1st Universal of the Central Council of Ukraine. The initial composition of the secretariat included eight General Secretaries (ministers) and one General Scribe (secretary).

== Background ==
The first document of the government that identified its program was the Declaration of the General Secretariat. It was publicly announced at the plenum meeting of the Central Council of Ukraine on June 26 by the head of the Secretariat, Volodymyr Vynnychenko. The document together with the First Universal caused a lot of worrying in Petrograd as precedent to possible separation. It only took several days when the official delegation led by Aleksandr Kerensky together with the Minister of Foreign Affairs Tereschenko and Minister of Post and Telegraph Tsereteli arrived to Kiev. The Russian delegation and the members of the General Secretariat along with Mykhailo Hrushevsky after some discussion worked out the new Universal of the UPR and the Declaration of the Russian Provisional Government that were announced on July 3.

On July 13, 1917, the Russian Provisional Government recognized the Secretariat as the highest executive power in Ukraine and requested from the Tsentralna Rada that the members of the secretariat ought to be confirmed by the Russian Government. The Secretariat would be expanded to include members of minorities and would be responsible to the Rada. By the end of July 1917 five more secretariats were added due to the Provisional Government request.

In the course of the next round of negotiations now in Petrograd the Ukrainian delegation was requesting the acceptance of the General Secretariat Statute by the Russian Provisional Government, which was approved by the Central Rada and proclaimed as the first Constitution. Those Negotiations ended with that the Prime Minister of Russia, Aleksandr Kerensky, signed the Instruction for the General Secretariat of the Provisional Government in Ukraine, a legal normative act, that was binding the local government of Ukraine for its execution. According to the Instruction, the General Secretariat had limited powers, but was acknowledged as the highest institution of the Provisional Government in Ukraine and authority of which stretched upon five gubernias Volyn, Podillia, Poltava, Kiev, and partially Chernihiv. The Russian Provisional Government requested the Secretariat to be reduced to nine members and that all of the members will be appointed by the Russian Government by the recommendations of the Tsentralna Rada. The secretariats of the military affairs, food and legal affairs, and postmaster-telegraph were to be canceled. After some negotiations the Tsentralna Rada yielded to the request on August 7, followed by the resignation of Volodymyr Vynnychenko as a sign of protest and pressure from the Ukrainian Socialist Revolutionary Party. Mala Rada has accepted his resignation on August 13. Dmytro Doroshenko (UPSF), a former head commissioner of the Provisional Government of Galicia and Bucovina, was offered to create a new Secretariat. The Mala Rada has confirmed his selections already on August 14, but soon Doroshenko resigned on August 18. Finally Vynnychenko came back to accomplish the task and on September 1 the Provisional Government confirmed the new administration.

In October 1917, the Russian Provisional Government stopped the transfer of funds to the General Secretariat and expressed its intentions to file a claim against its members for separatism and the participation in the All-Ukrainian Constituent Assembly. The Russian government requested an appearance of Volodymyr Vynnychenko personally for the full explanation in that regard. On October 21 at the meeting of the Secretariat the members reviewed the issue of sending a delegation to Petrograd headed by Vynnychenko together with Steshenko and Zarubin for the negotiations with the Provisional Government in reference to the political situation in Ukraine. That plan was cancelled due to the October Revolution of 1917, after which the Secretariat further expanded to supplement the ministries of the collapsed Provisional Government.

After the proclamation of the Third Universal on November 20, 1917, several members of secretariat resigned. Then on January 6, 1918, Symon Petliura was commissioned to take the charge of the "Haydamaka Kish" military unit. By start of 1918 the Secretariat has changed dramatically. On January 25 (dated January 22) 1918, the General Secretariat was transformed into the Council of People's Ministers after the declaration of the Fourth Universal and the independence of the Ukrainian People's Republic.

== Location ==
Initially the government was located at the same location as the Central Rada at 54 vulytsia Volodymyrska (Volodymyr Street), however Volodymyr Vynnychenko knew that it could not last for long as it only had two rooms assigned in the mediocre building. The government soon moved to 38 Khreshchatyk Street in the building of former hotel "Savvoi" which was not preserved after World War II. Currently at that location exists the building of the Kyiv City Council (36 Khreshchatyk Street). The first government budget was adopted on August 30, 1917. The proposition to move to the building of "Savvoi" hotel came up on the session of the Central Rada on September 13, 1917, with intentions to lease the place from the city government, under jurisdiction of which the hotel was.

The General Secretariat was allowed to move to "Savvoi" sometime in late September 1917, however that place was decided to be a temporary due to the physical conditions of the building. Vynnychenko tried to acquire the Mariinskyi Palace from the "Worker's and Soldier's Deputies", but unsuccessfully. Other interests were posed by the hotel "Frantsiya" (corner of Khreshchatyk and Prorizna vulytsia) and the Popov building (22 vulytsia Hrushevskoho). Today in place of the former hotel is located the building of Ministry of Energy and Fuel.

The General Secretariat was finally able to move to the former Palace of Governor-General in Kiev at 40 vulytsia Instytutska (Institute Street) in January 1918, while the hotel "Savvoi" after being restored was also secured after the Ukrainian government. Later the Palace has suffered greatly during the military actions in 1920 and was replaced by other building changing the address to 20/8 Institute Street.

== List of governments ==
- First Vynnychenko Government (July 13 – August 13)
- Doroshenko Government
- Second Vynnychenko Government (September 1, 1917 – January 1918)

== See also ==
- People's Secretariat, a Bolshevik's oppositional government
- Regional Committee in Protection of Revolution in Ukraine
