= Volodymyr Vynnychenko =

Prime Minister of Ukraine in 1917 and 1918

- Володимир Винниченко
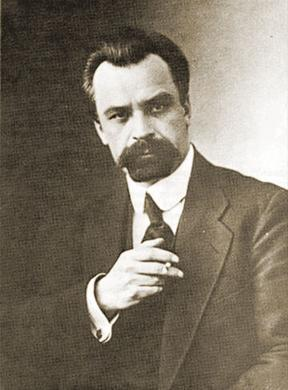
- Vynnychenko in 1910

1st Chairman of the Directory
- In office December 19, 1918 – February 10, 1919
- Preceded by: Pavlo Skoropadsky (as Hetman of Ukraine)
- Succeeded by: Symon Petliura

1st Prime Minister of the Ukrainian People's Republic
- In office June 28, 1917 – August 26, 1917
- President: Mykhailo Hrushevsky (speaker of Central Rada)
- Preceded by: Position Established
- Succeeded by: Vsevolod Holubovych

Secretary of Internal Affairs
- In office June 28, 1917 – January 30, 1918
- Prime Minister: Himself
- Preceded by: Position Established
- Succeeded by: Pavlo Khrystiuk

Personal details
- Born: July 28, 1880 Vesely Kut, Russian Empire (present-day Hryhorivka, Novoukrainka Raion, Ukraine)
- Died: March 6, 1951 (aged 70) Mougins, France
- Party: Foreign Group of Ukrainian Communists (1919)
- Other political affiliations: Ukrainian Social Democratic Labour Party (1905–1919); Revolutionary Ukrainian Party (?-1905)
- Spouse: Rosalia Yakovna Vynnychenko (Lifshits)
- Education: Kyiv University
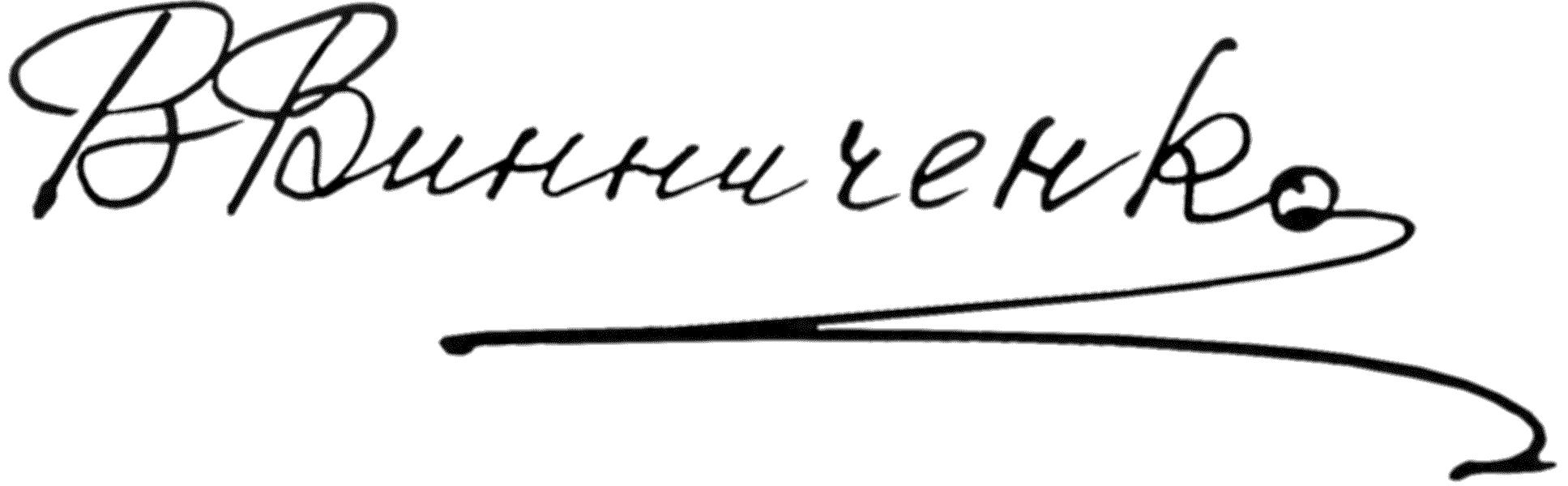
- Signature

Volodymyr Kyrylovych Vynnychenko (Ukrainian: Володимир Кирилович Винниченко, pronounced [woloˈdɪmɪr kɪˈrɪlowɪtʃ wɪnːɪˈtʃɛnko]; 28 July [O.S. 16 July] 1880 – March 6, 1951) was a Ukrainian statesman, political activist, writer, playwright and artist who served as the first prime minister of the Ukrainian People's Republic. Prior to his entry onto the stage of Ukrainian politics, he was a long-time political activist, who lived abroad in Western Europe from 1906 to 1914 escaping persecution by Russian authorities.

Vynnychenko's works reflect his immersion in the Ukrainian revolutionary milieu, as well as his life both among impoverished working-class people, and among émigrés living in Western Europe. He is recognized as a leading Ukrainian modernist writer of the pre-revolutionary era, and an author of short stories, novels, and plays. In Soviet Ukraine between the 1930s and mid-1980s Vynnychenko's works, like those of many other Ukrainian writers, were forbidden.

== Biography ==
=== Early life ===
Volodymyr Vynnychenko was born in a village, Vesely Kut (today – Hryhorivka, Novoukrainka Raion), in the Kherson Governorate of the Russian Empire, in a family of peasants. His father Kyrylo Vasyliovych Vynnychenko earlier in his life was a serf who moved from a village to the city of Yelisavetgrad, where he married a widow, Yevdokia Pavlenko (nee: Linnyk). From her previous marriage Yevdokia had three children: Andriy, Maria, and Vasyl; Volodymyr was her only child from the marriage with Kyrylo. Upon his graduation from a local public school, the Vynnychenko family managed to enroll Volodymyr at the Yelyzavetgrad Male Gymnasium (today its building belongs to the State Emergency Service of Ukraine). In later grades of the gymnasium he took part in a revolutionary organization and wrote a revolutionary poem for which he was incarcerated for a week and excluded from school. That did not stop him from continuing his studies as he was getting prepared for his test to obtain the high school diploma (Matura). He successfully took the test in the Zlatopil gymnasium from which obtained his attestation of maturity.

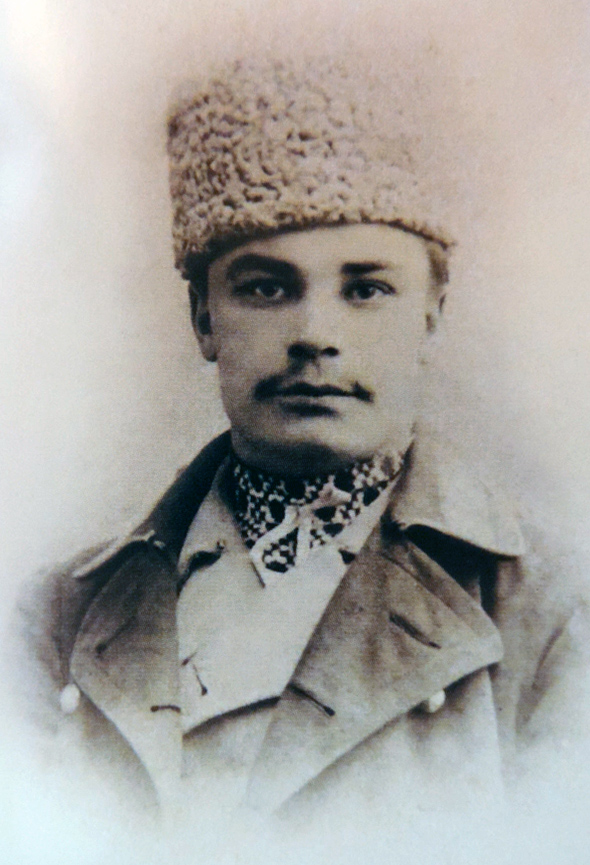
A young Vynnychenko in 1902

In 1900 Vynnychenko joined the Revolutionary Ukrainian Party (RUP) and enrolled in the law department at Kiev University, but in 1902 or 1903 he was expelled for participation in revolutionary activities. As a member of the RUP he provided political agitation and propaganda among the Kievan workers and peasants from Poltava and was jailed for several months in Lukyanivska Prison. He managed to escape from his incarceration. In 1902 Vynnychenko published in "Kievskaya starina" his first novel "Beauty and strength", after which he became known as a writer. Afterward, due to a new arrest he was forcibly drafted into a punitive battalion in the Russian Imperial army where he began to agitate soldiers with revolutionary propaganda. Tipped off that his arrest was imminent, Vynnychenko illegally fled to eastern Galicia, Austria-Hungary. When trying to return to Russian Ukraine with revolutionary literature, Vynnychenko was arrested and jailed for one year with a threat to spend the rest of his life in katorga. After his release in 1904, he passed his exams for a law degree in Kiev University.

In 1906 Vynnychenko was arrested for a third time, again for his political activities, and jailed for a year; before his scheduled trial, however, the wealthy patron of Ukrainian literature and culture, Yevhen Chykalenko, paid his bail, and Vynnychenko fled Ukraine again, effectively becoming an émigré writer abroad from 1907 to 1914, living in Lemberg (Lviv), Vienna, Geneva, Paris, Florence, Berlin. In 1911 Vynnychenko married Rosalia Lifshitz, a French Jewish doctor. From 1914 to 1917 Vynnychenko lived illegally near Moscow throughout much of World War I and returned to Kiev in 1917 to assume a leading role in Ukrainian politics.

=== Head of the first Ukrainian government ===
After the February Revolution in Russia in 1917, Vynnychenko served as the head of the General Secretariat of Ukraine, a local representative executive body of the Russian Provisional Government. He was authorized by the Central Rada of Ukraine to conduct negotiations with the Russian Provisional Government.

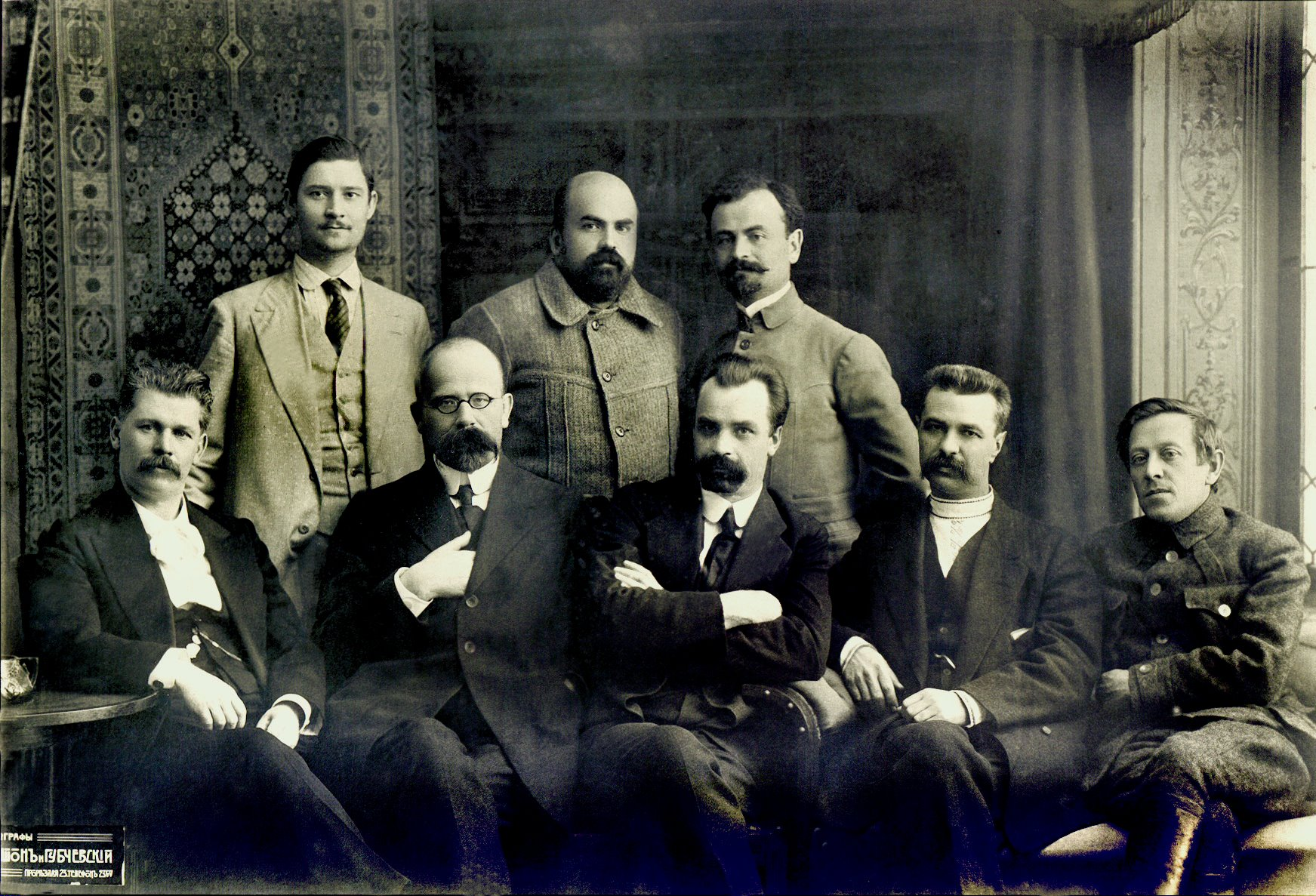
First General Secretariat of the Ukrainian Central Rada

Vynnychenko resigned his post in the General Secretariat on August 13 in protest against the Russian government's rejection of the Universal of Central Rada. For a brief period he was replaced by Dmytro Doroshenko who composed a new government the next day, yet unexpectedly he requested his resignation as well on August 18. Vynnychenko was offered to return, form a cabinet and redesign the Second Universal to petition a federal union with the Russian Republic. His second government was confirmed by Alexander Kerensky on September 1.

It is often claimed that the political mistakes of Vynnychenko and Mykhailo Hrushevsky cost the newly established Ukrainian People's Republic its independence. Both men were strongly opposed to the creation of the army of the Republic and repeatedly denied the requests by Symon Petliura to use his volunteer forces as the core of a would-be army (see Polubotok Regiment Affair).

After the October Revolution and the Kiev Bolshevik uprising many of his secretaries resigned after the Central Rada disapproved the Bolsheviks' actions in Petrograd with the ongoing confrontations in Moscow as well as the other cities in the country. On January 22, 1918, the Ukrainian People's Republic proclaimed its independence because of the Bolshevik intervention headed by Antonov-Ovseyenko. The country was squeezed between the abandoned German-Russian frontlines to its western border and the advancing Bolshevik forces of Muravyov along the eastern border. Within days, Mikhail Muravyov managed to invade Kiev, forcing the government to evacuate to Zhytomyr whose retreat was secured by the efforts of the Yevhen Konovalets Sich Riflemen. During the evacuation, the Ukrainian government managed to secure military assistance in the face of the Central Powers. The government signed the highly-criticised treaty with the Germans to repel the Bolshevik forces in exchange for a right to expropriate food supplies. That treaty also required the Soviet Russia to recognise the Ukrainian People's Republic. Around then, Vynnychenko's government established an economic agreement with the government of the Belarus People's Republic through the Belarus Chamber of Commerce in Kiev. However, Vynnychenko's was replaced as well by the Socialist-Revolutionary government of Vsevolod Holubovych.

After the coup d'état of Hetman Pavlo Skoropadsky in collaboration with the German occupation forces in April 1918, Vynnychenko left Kiev. During the period of Skoropadsky's rule he headed the Ukrainian National Union. Later, after forming the Directorate of Ukraine, he took an active part in organizing a revolt against the Hetman. The revolt was successful and Vynnychenko returned to the capital on December 19, 1918. The Directorate, a temporary executive council of five, proclaimed the restoration of the Ukrainian People's Republic. The Directorate was put in charge by the Labour Congress until the Ukrainian Constituent Assembly would convene to elect a permanent body of government.

=== Resignation ===
On his post, Vynnychenko was unable to restore order or to overcome his disagreement with Petliura. Critical of the policies of most Ukrainian parties, which he considered to be too right-wing and pro-Entente, he stepped down on February 10, 1919 and emigrated abroad. According to the terms of his resignation, Vynnychenko received a sum of 20 million hryvnias from Ukrainian authorities, which he would later use to purchase a residence in France and finance his literary work. In a brief period in Vienna in 1920, he wrote his three-volume "Rebirth of the Nation". At the same time, at the end of 1919, Vynnychenko resigned from the Ukrainian Social Democratic Labour Party and formed the Foreign Group of Ukrainian Communists.

=== Soviet Ukraine ===
In June 1920 Vynnychenko himself travelled to Moscow in an attempt to come to an agreement with the Bolsheviks. After four months of unsuccessful negotiations, Vynnychenko had become disillusioned with the Bolsheviks: he accused them of Great Russian Chauvinism and insincerity as socialists. In September 1920 he returned to émigré life, where he revealed his impressions of Bolshevik rule. This action produced a split in the Foreign Group of the Ukrainian Communist Party: some remained pro-Bolshevik and indeed returned to Soviet Ukraine; others supported Vynnychenko, and with him conducted a campaign against the Soviet regime in their organ Nova Doba ("New Era").

=== Exile ===
Vynnychenko spent 30 years in Europe, residing in Germany in the 1920s and then moving to France. As an émigré, Vynnychenko resumed his career as a writer. In 1919, his works were republished in an eleven-volume edition in the 1920s.

In 1928 he published a science fiction novel, Soniashna mashyna ["The Solar Machine"], which has been described as "best-selling" despite facing hardships from the Soviet censors, who criticized it for not mentioning the existence of the USSR in its future history.

In 1934, Vynnychenko moved from Paris to Mougins, near Cannes, on the Mediterranean coast, where he lived on a homestead type residence as a self-supporting farmer and continued to write, notably a philosophical exposition of his ideas about happiness, Concordism. Vynnychenko called his place Zakoutok.

During the German occupation of France, for refusing to cooperate with the Nazis, Vynnychenko was thrown into a concentration camp, which affected his health severely. After the end of the war, he called for general disarmament and peaceful coexistence of the East and West.

He died in Mougins, near Cannes, France in 1951. Rosalia Lifshitz after her death passed the estate to Ivanna Nyzhnyk-Vynnykiv (1912–1993), who emigrated to France after World War II and lived with Vynnychenko since 1948.

== Political views ==
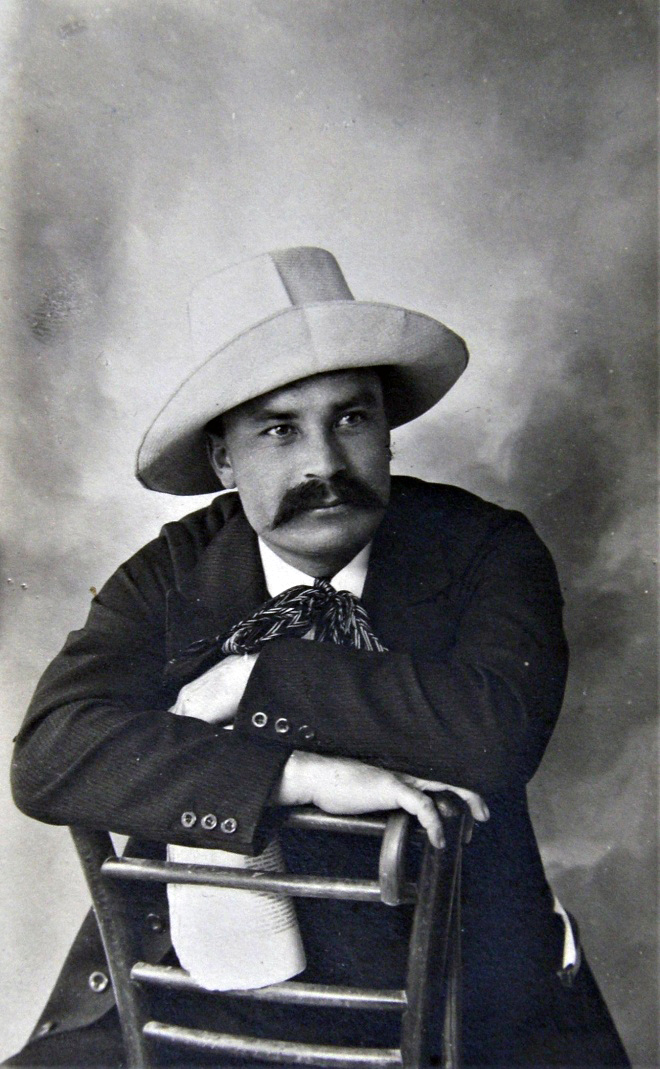
Vynnychenko in the 1910s

Vynnychenko’s political awakening arose, he claimed, at the intersection of social and national experience. Writing in his diary in 1919, he recalled that “from the time the landowner Bodisko beat my father on his estate, fooled him, exploited him, chased him from his plot into the field, where I was tending livestock, from that moment I already took into my soul the seed of hatred for social exploitation, for Bodiskos of all types.” Other youthful experiences added feelings of national humiliation and anger to these social emotions. He recalled, for example, how, as a gymnasium student, teachers and other students (“young gentlemen”) treated him as a “little muzhik” [peasant] and a “little khokhol” [a derisive term for Ukrainian]. Vynnychenko demanded respect and recognition for Ukraine and Ukrainians as a nation. In 1913, he published in Russian an “Open Letter to Russian Writers” that criticized the “unconscious” tendency in a great deal of Russian literature to stereotype Ukrainians and others. The Ukrainian characters who appear in Russian literature, he argued, are much like the stereotypes of Jews and Armenians that Russians also have “a weakness for.” “Always and everywhere [in Russian literature] the ‘khokhol’ is a little stupid, a little cunning, a little lazy, melancholic and sometimes good-natured.” These stereotypes are “shameful” not only for Ukrainians whose equal humanity is not recognized but for Russian writers themselves and Russian literature.

During the First World War, which brought fighting and occupation onto Ukrainian lands, Vynnychenko rhetorically wondered why our “brother” Russians show little concern with the suffering of Ukrainians? Why does “the love among Ukrainians for their own nation [narod] and sorrow for its fate elicit…wrath, indignation, and feelings of spite, or, at best, sarcasm or indifference?” The answer, he argued (writing in Russian, so again addressing Russians as much as Ukrainians), is that Ukrainians are becoming strong and aware as a nation, and “they fear us.” But nothing can stop the development of Ukrainian “consciousness,” he declared, which is already manifest in its intelligentsia. “Just as you cannot stop the formation of clouds, arising from the earth and returning to it, so it is impossible to stop the formation of a nationally conscious stratum in a people. We emerge from the raw earth, from the soil, from the depths of our nation, and we again return to it, and we again arise.”

Vynnychenko believed that it was not enough to change structures of power in freeing the Ukrainian nation. Liberation demanded changes in people’s mentalities and values, in their moral and spiritual lives, in their selves. A true revolution needed to be, Vynnychenko insisted, all-sided, all-embracing, universal liberation (vsebichne vyzvolennia). To explore and promote this vision, he examined in his fiction questions of sexuality, emotion, will, and character. Ultimately, the point was to ask the most important question: how to realize a fully human and fully free personality, especially in the face of the crushing conditions and legacies of unfreedom?

== Writings ==
=== Prose stories ===
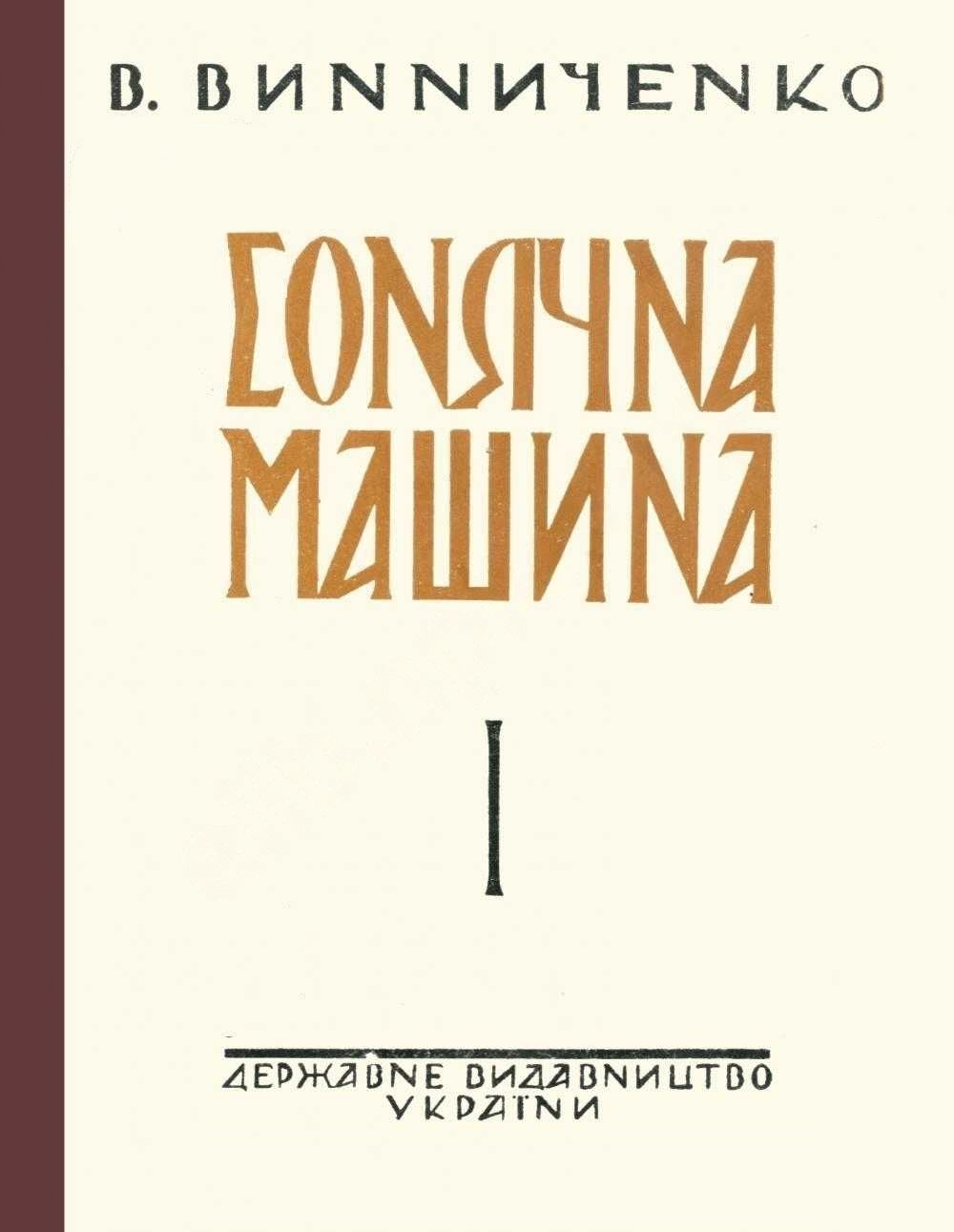
First part of The Sun Machine, 1928

Vynnychenko first became famous as a writer in 1902. His naturalistic short stories gained popularity due to their contrast with the narodnik prose. In his writings Vynnychenko described the life of the lower social strata such as labour migrants, hired servants at noble estates and marginalized elements (most notably - The Beggars (Ukrainian: Голота), 1904). He demonstrated the picture of social and moral decay of traditional villages and devoted his attention to the life of provincial bourgeoisie, soldiers, prisoners and revolutionary intelligentsia. Vynnychenko's realism was combined with impressionistic elements.

In his later works composed after 1905 Vynnychenko increasingly introduced the topic of human psychology. His typical literary hero of that period is a cynical egoist, who denies the basics of human morals in the name of "honesty with oneself" and allows himself to commit any deed if it is supported by his own "will, reason and heart". Heroes of Vynnychenko's plays and novels are prone to hysteria and lack of willpower, and have an unstable worldview, which influences their behaviour. Elements of satire are present in his 1917 novel Notes of a Snub-Nosed Mephistopheles (Ukrainian: Записки кирпатого Мефістофеля). After the Revolution of 1917 Vynnychenko involved utopian and political ideas in some of his works, dedicating his writings to the problem of human labour (The Sun Machine, 1928) and the need to oppose Bolshevik expansion in Western countries (New Commandment, 1949).

=== Plays ===
Vynnyhenko's early play Disharmony (Ukrainian: Дисгармонія), which he composed in 1905, caused a scandal because of the rejection of morals by its main hero, and was banned from being staged. Five of Vynnychenko's following plays concerned themselves with revolutionary topics, and were similarly banned by censorship. His first unpoliticized drama called Lies (Ukrainian: Брехня) was published in 1910 and achieved great success after its production by Kyiv's Mykola Sadovskyi Theatre in the following year; in 1918 it was adapted as a film, and in the following decade reached the stages of numerous European countries. Vynnychenko's next play, The Black Panther and the White Bear (Чорна Пантера і Білий Ведмідь, 1911), was produced in Germany during the early 1920s and was also followed by a film adaptation in 1921, but failed to achieve the similar degree of success.

Vynnychenko's plays revolutionized the Ukrainian theatre, contrasting with works of earlier authors and their predominantly ethnographic character. His theatrical works were especially popular during the revolutionary period, with two new Ukrainian theatres - Molodyy Theatre and the National Theatre - opening their inaugural seasons with dramas by Vynnychenko in 1917.

=== Criticism ===
Vynnychenko's writing has been praised for his attention to detail, realism, dynamic plots and use of humour. At the same time, his language has been condemned for its dryness and lack of form, as well as a tendency for moralism and overly artificial depiction of psychological conflicts.

== Legacy ==
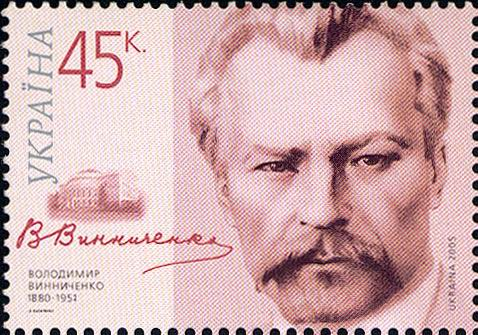
Ukrainian commemorative stamp of Volodymyr Vynnychenko

Vynnychenko is still somewhat famous in Ukraine. Vynnychenko has not been as popular as Mykhailo Hrushevsky as a political figure, but is widely known as writer; his work was adapted for screen numerous times since the 1990s by Dovzhenko Film Studios directors.

Vynnychenko's archives are housed in Columbia University, New York City and supervised by a commission of the Ukrainian Academy of Arts and Sciences.

=== Films based on works of Vynnychenko ===
- 1921 The Black Panther
- 1990 Black panther and White bear (Oleh Biyma, Ukrtelefilm)
- 1991 Sin (Oleh Biyma, Ukrtelefilm)
- 1995 TV-series Island of Love: Episode 8 "Engagement" (Oleh Biyma, Ukrtelefilm) after the novel "Engagement"

=== Depiction of Vynnychenko in cinema ===
- 1939 Shchors (Oleksandr Dovzhenko and Yuliya Solntseva, Kiev Film Studios) by Dmytro Milyutenko
- 1957 Truth (Viktor Dobrovolsky and Isaak Shmaruk, Dovzhenko Film Studios) by Heorhiy Babenko
- 1970 Peace to huts – War to palaces (Isaak Shmaruk, Dovzhenko Film Studios) by Vladislav Strzhelchik
- 1970 Kotsyubynsky family (Tymofiy Levchuk, Dovzhenko Film Studios) by Harijs Liepiņš
- 2018 Secret diary of Symon Petliura (Oles Yanchuk, Dovzhenko Film Studios) by Yevhen Nyshchuk

== Bibliography ==
- Vynnychenko, V. Selected short stories. Longwood Academic, 1991. ISBN 9780893416423 (Book at Google)
- Vynnychenko, V. Rebirth of the Nation. (History of Ukrainian Revolution. March 1917 – December 1919). Vol 1–3. Kiev-Vienna: "Dzvin", 1920.
- Vynnychenko, Volodymyr. Black Panther and Polar Bear. Translated into English by Yuri Tkacz. Melbourne: Bayda Books, 2020. ISBN 978-0-908480-46-3

== Sources ==
- Bahrii-Pykulyk, R. Rozum ta irrattsiional'nist' u Vynnychenkomu romani. (Reason and irrationality in Vynnychenko's novel). New York: "Suchasnist'", 27, no.4 (1987): 11–22.
- Czajkowskyj, M. Volodymyr Vynnychenko and his Mission to Moscow and Kharkiv. "Journal of Graduate Ukrainian Studies", 1978, Vol. 3, No.2, pp. 3–24.
- Gilley, C. The Change of Signposts in the Ukrainian Emigration: A Contribution to the History of Sovietophilism in the 1920s. Stuttgart: "Ibidem", 2009. Chapter 3.
- Gilley, C. Volodymyr Vynnychenko’s Mission to Moscow and Kharkov. "The Slavonic and East European Review". Vol.84, 2006, No.3, pp. 508–37.
- Kostiuk, H. Volodymyr Vynnychenko ta ioho doba. (Volodymyr Vynnychenko and his era). New York: "UAAS", 1980.
- Panchenko, V. Budynok z khymeramy: Tvorchist' Volodymyra Vynnychenka 1900–1920 r.r. u evropeys'komu literaturnomu konteksti. (A building made of chimeras: the creative work of Volodymyr Vynnychenko 1900–1920 in the European literary context). Kirovohrad: "Narodne Slovo", 1998.
- Steinberg, M. D. "Overcoming Empire: Volodymyr Vynnychenko," in The Russian Revolution, 1905-21, Oxford University Press, 2017: 244-60.
- Struk, D.H. Vynnychenko's Moral Laboratory. "In Studies in Ukrainian Literature 1984–1985".
