= First Universal of the Ukrainian Central Rada =

Universal of the Ukrainian Central Council

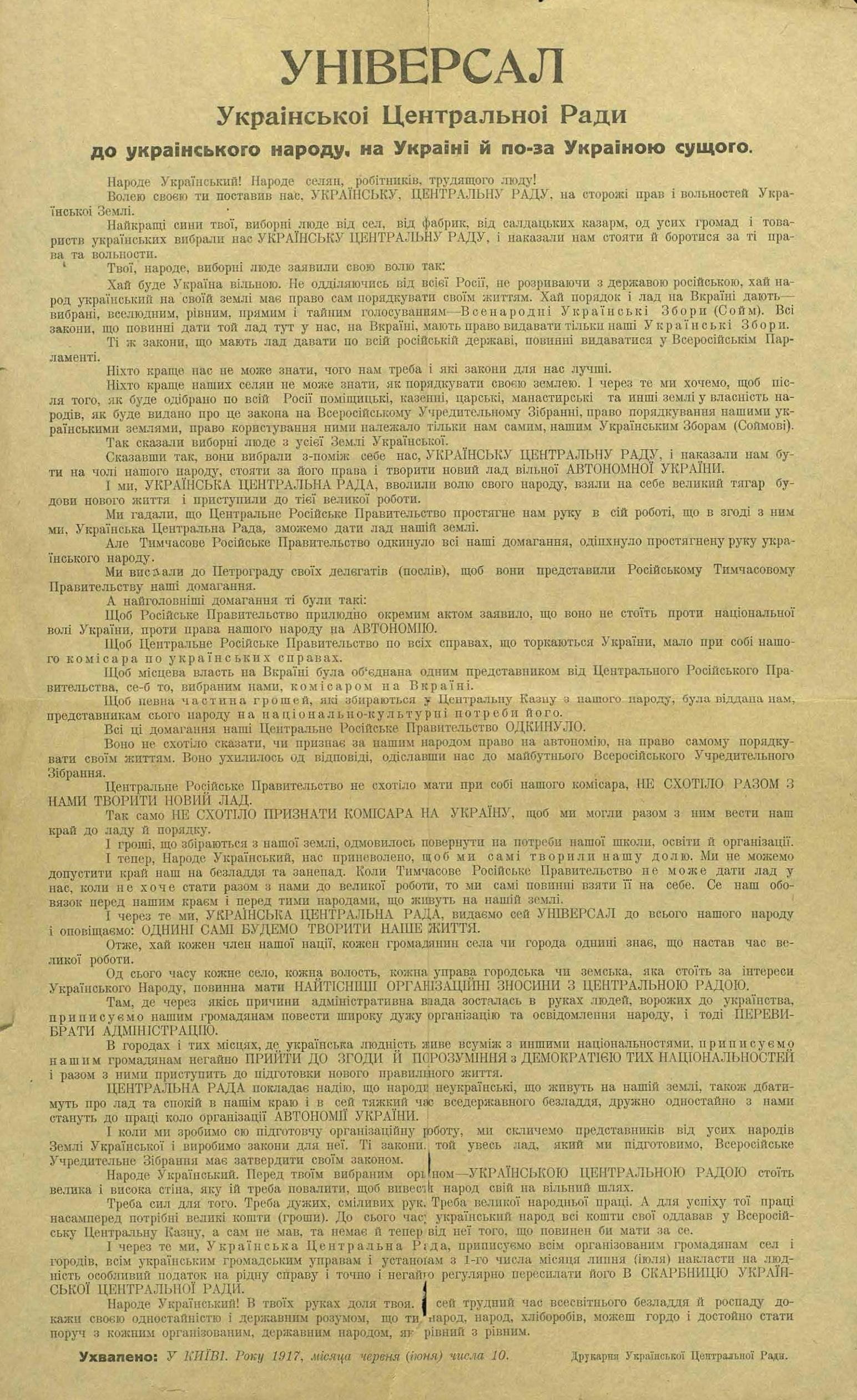
- I Universal
- Ratified: 23 June [O.S. 10 June] 1917
- Location: Kyiv, Ukraine
- Author: Volodymyr Vynnychenko
- Signatories: Little Council of the Ukrainian Central Council
- Purpose: declaration of the national autonomy

The First Universal of the Ukrainian Central Rada (Council) (Ukrainian: Перший Універсал Української Центральної Ради, romanized: Pershyi Universal Ukrainskoi Tsentralnoi Rady) is a state-political act, the universal of the Central Rada (Council) of Ukraine, which proclaimed the autonomy of Ukraine. Accepted 23 June [O.S. 10 June] 1917 in Kyiv. The full name is "the Universal of the Ukrainian Central Rada to the Ukrainian people, in Ukraine and beyond Ukraine".

== Description ==
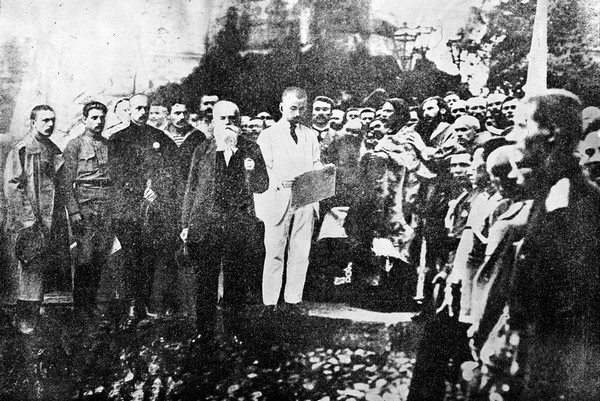
Proclamation of the First Universal of the Ukrainian Central Rada to the people of Ukraine after the prayer service on Sofia Square. Reads Mykola Kovalevskyi. In the center - Mykhailo Hrushevskyi

At the end of May, the Central Rada sent a delegation to Petrograd headed by Volodymyr Vynnychenko and Mykola Kovalevskyi. The delegation demanded the Ukrainization of the army, administration, and schooling, as well as that the Provisional Government of Russia Republic express its principled attitude to the possibility of granting autonomy to Ukraine. In response to the Provisional Government's refusal, the Central Council issued its First Universal, adopted on 23 June [O.S. 10 June] 1917 and proclaimed at the Second Military Congress. It stated:

Let Ukraine be free. Without separating from all of Russian, without breaking with the Russian Republic, let the Ukrainian people on their land have the right to organize their own lives. Let order and order be restored in Ukraine - the National Ukrainian Assembly (Seimas) elected by popular, equal, direct and secret ballot. All the laws that should give that order here in Ukraine, have the right to issue only our Ukrainian Assembly.

— from the text of the First Universal of the UCR.

In the Universal it was emphasized that the Central Rada would "create a new system of free autonomous Ukraine."

The adoption of the First Universal forced the Provisional Government to send a delegation of ministers Tereshchenko and Tsereteli to Kyiv. They were later joined by Justice Minister Kerensky. On the Ukrainian side, Mykhailo Hrushevsky, Volodymyr Vynnychenko, and Simon Petliura took part in the talks. The result was the recognition of the Central Rada as the regional governing body in Ukraine. Russia's chauvinist circles were shocked by the "impudence" of Ukrainians - the First Universal. The caretaker government and the press competed in accusations of "betrayal", "separatism", "breakthrough of the front" and other deadly sins. On June 29, 1917, a delegation of the Provisional Government arrived in Kyiv. After two days of debate, a compromise was found - the Petrograd ministers agreed that the Ukrainian Central Rada draft a charter of Ukraine's autonomy on the condition that it be submitted for final approval by the All-Russian Constituent Assembly. Thus, the text of the new Universal was worked out, which was to be announced simultaneously with the Declaration of the Provisional Government in one day.

A stormy meeting of the Provisional Government took place in Petrograd, at which M. Tereshchenko and I. Tsereteli reported on their trip to Kyiv. The majority of the government still voted in favor of the agreement with Ukraine. The text of the agreement was telegraphed to V. Vynnychenko on July 3 (July 16 in the new style). The telegram confirmed the authority of the General Secretariat as a regional government with the expansion of its membership at the expense of representatives of minorities. The interim government of Russia also reaffirmed its commitment to "the development by the Central Council of a draft of the national and political status of Ukraine in such a sense that the Council itself will consider it in the interests of the region." The Provisional Government disagreed with only one thing: the Ukrainization of the army: "As for the Ukrainian military committees on the ground, they exercise their powers on a general basis," "the Provisional Government considers inadmissible measures that could disrupt the unity of organization and management of the army."

== Anniversaries and memorable dates ==
In 2017, the state level in Ukraine celebrated the anniversary - 100 years since the adoption of the First Universal of the Ukrainian Central Council (1917).

== Document ==
Typewritten copy from the newspaper publication ("Robitnycha Hazeta") and the Universal, stored in the Central State Archives of Ukraine, f. 1115, op. 1, file no. 4, pp. 5–8.

== See also ==
- Constitution of the Ukrainian People's Republic
- Universals
  - Second Universal of the Ukrainian Central Council
  - Third Universal of the Ukrainian Central Council
  - Fourth Universal of the Ukrainian Central Council
- Unification Act
- Russian Constituent Assembly
- Ukrainian Constituent Assembly
