= Second Universal of the Ukrainian Central Rada =

Universal of the Ukrainian Central Council

Second Universal of the Ukrainian Central Council
- II Universal
- Ratified: 16 July [O.S. 3 July] 1917
- Location: Kyiv, Ukraine
- Author: Volodymyr Vynnychenko
- Signatories: Little Council of the Ukrainian Central Rada
- Purpose: Agreements between the Ukrainian Central Rada and the Provisional Government of Russian Republic

The Second Universal of the Ukrainian Central Rada (Council) (Ukrainian: Другий Універсал Української Центральної Ради, romanized: Druhyi Universal Ukrainskoi Tsentralnoi Rady) is a state-political act, universal of the Central Rada (Council) of Ukraine, which fixed the agreements between the Ukrainian Central Rada and the Provisional Government of Russian Republic. Proclaimed by Volodymyr Vynnychenko 16 July [O.S. 3 July] 1917 in Kyiv, at a solemn meeting at the Pedagogical Museum in response to a telegram from the Provisional Government to the Central Rada.

== Description ==
According to the Universal, the Provisional Government recognized Ukraine's right to autonomy, and the UCR and the General Secretariat recognized public authorities in Ukraine. Instead, the UCR was forced to agree that the question of the form of autonomy would be finally resolved by the All-Russian Constituent Assembly and to recognize that Ukraine did not claim full state independence. The Central Council accepted the conditions of the Provisional Government to expand its membership at the expense of representatives of national minorities of Ukraine. It undertook to draft laws on Ukrainian autonomy for consideration by the Constituent Assembly of Russia. In fact, the territory of the autonomous Ukrainian People's Republic included the territories of Kyiv, Podil, Volyn, Chernihiv, and Poltava Governorates. As for the army, the Universal states:

As for the manning of military units, the Central Council will have its representatives in the Cabinet of the Minister of War, the General Staff and the Supreme Commander, who will participate in the manning of individual units exclusively by Ukrainians, as such manning, according to the Minister of War, will be technically possible without violating the combat effectiveness of the army.

II Universal is ambiguously perceived by Ukrainians. Many of them regarded him as a betrayal, calling him "the second Pereyaslav." Mykola Mikhnovskyi, the leader of the Ukrainian nationalists, sharply, partly fair, criticized him. The Russians benefited more from the Ukrainian-Russian treaty (namely, the Universal in combination with the Declaration of the Provisional Government). Recognizing the right of Ukrainians to autonomy, the Provisional Government did not give them anything more than what they had already gained without his blessing. Thus, in particular, she assured that she was determined "against the intentions of the unauthorized exercise of Ukraine's autonomy" to convene the Constituent Assembly. In addition, the UCR voluntarily gave the Provisional Government the right to approve members of the Ukrainian General Secretariat, which previously belonged to it. Thus, in the political sense, it was a step backwards in the development of the Ukrainian revolution. At the same time, it was a compromise.

== Historiography ==
The Second Universal of the Ukrainian Central Rada does not have a unanimous assessment among contemporaries and researchers. For example, Mykhailo Hrushevskyi (who was the head of the UCR at the time) believed that "the UCR's understanding with the Russian government opened a new page in the life of Ukraine." Modern researcher Yaroslav Hrytsak notes that "without a doubt, the Second Universal was a step backwards compared to the First Universal."

== See also ==
- Constitution of the Ukrainian People's Republic
- Universals
  - First Universal of the Ukrainian Central Council
  - Third Universal of the Ukrainian Central Council
  - Fourth Universal of the Ukrainian Central Council
- Unification Act
- Russian Constituent Assembly
- Ukrainian Constituent Assembly
