= Third Universal of the Ukrainian Central Rada =

1917 political declaration

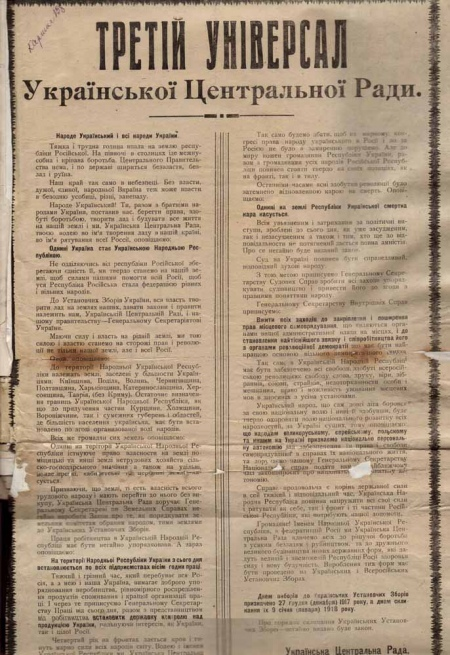
- III Universal
- Ratified: 20 November [O.S. 7 November] 1917
- Location: Kyiv, Ukraine
- Author: Mykhailo Hrushevskyi et al.
- Signatories: Little Council of the Ukrainian Central Rada
- Purpose: Proclaiming the formation of the Ukrainian People's Republic.

The Third Universal of the Ukrainian Central Rada (Council) (Ukrainian: Третій Універсал Української Центральної Ради, romanized: Tretii Universal Ukrainskoi Tsentralnoi Rady) is a state-political act, universal of the Central Rada (Council) of Ukraine, proclaiming the formation of the Ukrainian People's Republic (UPR). Accepted 20 November [O.S. 7 November] 1917 in November in Kyiv.

== Description ==
The idea of proclaiming the Ukrainian People's Republic was first put forward by Mykhailo Hrushevskyi in his introductory speech on the opening day of the Congress of the Enslaved Peoples of Russia. Ukraine has already seceded from the Russian Republic, maintaining only a formal federal connection with it, and the task was only to legalize this fact. On November 7, M. Hrushevsky opened a solemn meeting of the Ukrainian Central Council and after the introductory speech Mykola Kovalskyi read the text of the Universal:

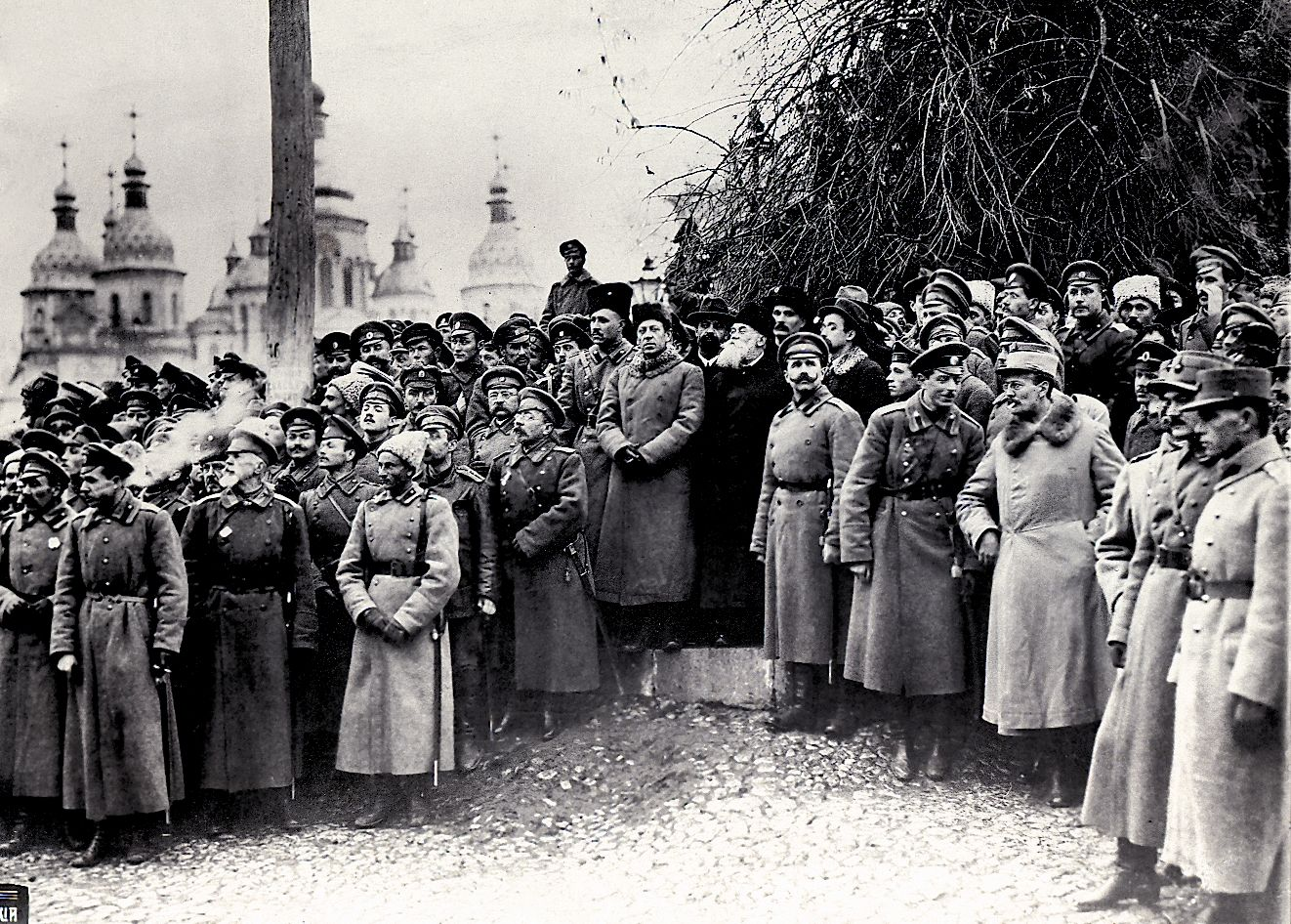
Proclamation of the Third Universal on Sofia Square in Kyiv. In the center — Symon Petliura, Mykhailo Hrushevskyi, Volodymyr Vynnychenko.

- It was stated that Ukraine was not separating from Russia, but that all power in Ukraine now belonged only to the Central Rada and the General Secretariat of Ukraine.
- Ukraine becomes the Ukrainian People's Republic.
- Its territory includes lands (governorate) inhabited mainly by Ukrainians: Kyiv, Podillia, Volyn, Chernihiv, Poltava, Kharkiv, Katerynoslav, Kherson, Tavriia (excluding Crimea). Finally, the issue of accession to Ukraine of Kursk, Kholm, Voronezh and other adjacent territories with Ukraine with a predominantly Ukrainian population had to be resolved through negotiations.
- An 8-hour working day was declared in Ukraine.
- State control over production was introduced.
- Ukraine advocates the immediate conclusion of peace between the warring parties in the World War I
- The death penalty was abolished and an amnesty was announced.
- A truly independent court must be established in Ukraine.
- Ukraine recognizes national and personal autonomy for national minorities.
- Elections to the All-Ukrainian Constituent Assembly were scheduled for 9 January [O.S. 27 December], which was scheduled to be convened on 22 January [O.S. 9 January] in 1918.

After the text was announced, after a short break, at the suggestion of the Ukrainian Socialist-Revolutionary Faction, Universal III was put to a roll-call vote in the Central Rada. This is the first time. Of the 50 members of the Little Council (Central Council Committee), 47 were present in the hall, of whom voted:

- For the approval of the Universal — 42,
- Against the adoption of the Universal — none,
- Abstained — 5 members of the Soviet (2 Russian Socialist Revolutionaries) (Sklovskyi, Saradzhev), 2 — Mensheviks (Kononenko, Balabanov), 1 — a representative of the Polish Democratic Central (Rudnicki).

Views on the universal were different, for example, the Cadets declared it a surrender to the Bolsheviks. The population of Ukraine did not recognize the abolition of private property. All farms with more than 50 tithes became state-owned, so the peasants did not receive new land, and the landlords lost their farms. Unsuccessful land policy led to the support of the Ukrainian peasantry of the Bolsheviks, who, after establishing their power, distributed the land according to the number of eaters in the family.

== Anniversaries and memorable dates ==
In 2017, at the state level in Ukraine, the anniversary was celebrated – 100 years since the proclamation of the Ukrainian People's Republic by III Universal of the Ukrainian Central Council.

== See also ==
- Constitution of the Ukrainian People's Republic
- Universals
  - First Universal of the Ukrainian Central Council
  - Second Universal of the Ukrainian Central Council
  - Fourth Universal of the Ukrainian Central Council
- Unification Act
- Russian Constituent Assembly
- Ukrainian Constituent Assembly

== Sources ==
- О. Б. Кудлай. Третій Універсал ЦР // Енциклопедія історії України : у 10 т. / редкол.: В. А. Смолій (голова) та ін. ; Інститут історії України НАН України. — Київ. : Наукова думка, 2013. — Т. 10 : Т — Я. — С. 147. — 784 с. : іл. — ISBN 978-966-00-1359-9.
- Мироненко О. М. Третій Універсал Української Центральної Ради // Юридична енциклопедія: В 6 т. / Редкол.: Ю70 Ю. С. Шемшученко (голова редкол.) та ін. — К. : «Укр. енцикл.», 1998. — ISBN 966-7492-00-1.
- Третій універсал Української Центральної Ради, 7 листопада 1917 р. // ЦДАВО України, ф. 1115, оп. 1, спр. 4, арк. 9.
- (ІІІ) Універсал Української Центральної Ради // Офіційна сторінка Верховної Ради України.
