= Fourth Universal of the Ukrainian Central Rada =

1918 declaration of independence of the Ukrainian People's Republic

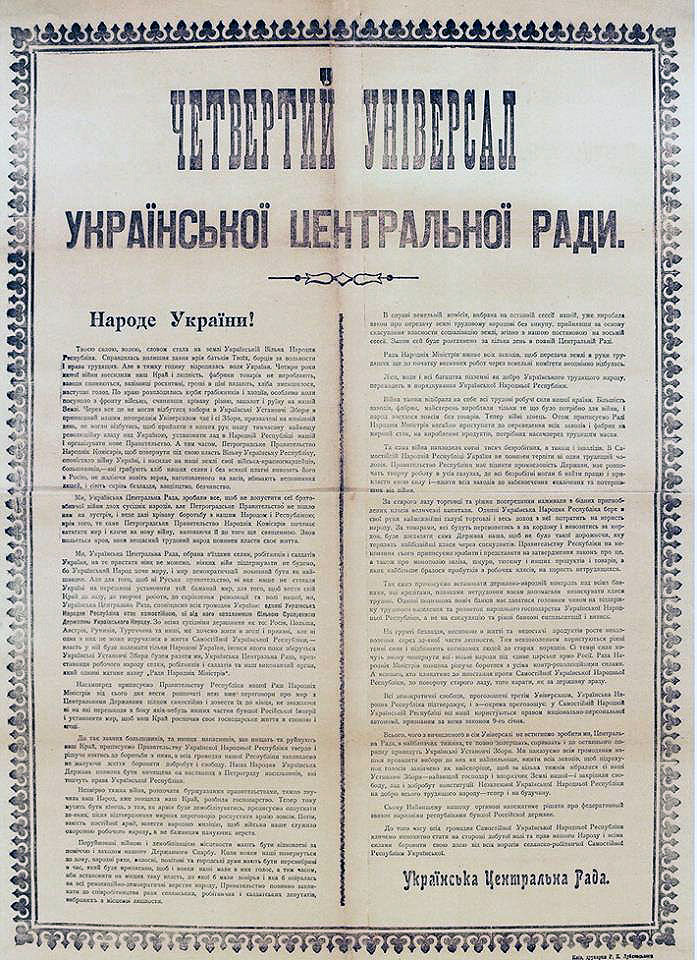
- Presented: 24 January [O.S. 11 January] 1918
- Ratified: 22 January [O.S. 9 January] 1918
- Location: Engrossed copy: Central State Electronic Archives of Ukraine; Rough draft: Central State Archives of Higher Organs of State Power and Administration of Ukraine
- Author: Mykhailo Hrushevskyi et al.
- Signatories: Lower Council of the Central Rada
- Purpose: To announce and explain independence of Ukrainian People's Republic

The Fourth Universal of the Ukrainian Central Rada (Council) (Ukrainian: Четвертий Універсал Української Центральної Ради, romanized: Chetvertyi Universal Ukrainskoi Tsentralnoi Rady) is a significant state-political declaration that proclaimed the full state independence of the Ukrainian People's Republic. It was enacted by the Lower Council (Committee) of the Ukrainian Central Rada (Council) in Kyiv on 22 January [O.S. 9 January] 1918. (Note: Some sources claim that the document was adopted on 24 January [O.S. 11 January] 1918 or on 25 January [O.S. 12 January] 1918.) Its issuance followed the commencement of peace negotiations between the Ukrainian People's Republic and the Central Powers in Brest-Litovsk (now in Brest, Belarus).

== Description ==
The document proclaimed that "henceforth, the Ukrainian People's Republic is an autonomous, independent, and sovereign state of the Ukrainian people." It also expressed a commitment to peaceful coexistence with neighboring states and emphasized that these states had no right to intervene in its internal affairs. The adoption of the Universal affirmed the authority of the state power of the Ukrainian Central Council until the convening of the Ukrainian Constituent Assembly. The executive body of the General Secretariat of the Ukrainian Central Council was reorganized into the Council of People's Ministers of the Ukrainian People's Republic, which aimed to continue negotiations with the Central Powers, securing recognition of the Ukrainian People's Republic as a fully independent state. These negotiations ultimately culminated in the signing of the Treaty of Brest-Litovsk.

The Universal urged the government and citizens of Ukraine to resist Bolsheviks and other "adversaries" who had devastated the land during the Ukrainian–Soviet War. It proposed the dissolution of the standing national armed forces, which had been created through the Ukrainization of Russian Army units, (Note: in the text, after establishing a peace) and the establishment of a people's militia in their place.

In the economic sphere, the aim was to transition industrial enterprises to a peaceful state, with the anticipation of establishing state control over banks, major branches of trade, export-import activities, and implementing state monopoly on strategic products like metal and coal. Plans were underway for a land law that would redistribute land to the laboring peasantry without compensation, as part of the cancellation of private property and socialization efforts before the start of spring fieldwork.

The document also reaffirmed all public liberties declared in the Third Universal of the Ukrainian Central Council, scheduled re-elections to the people's councils, and called on all citizens to participate actively in the elections to the Ukrainian Constituent Assembly. The Fourth Universal of the Ukrainian Central Council explicitly outlined the establishment of a sovereign country as the ultimate goal for all Ukrainians.

== International recognition ==
On 22 January [O.S. 9 January] 1918 the United Kingdom officially recognized the Ukrainian People's Republic. John Picton Bagge, the former British consul-general for South Russia in Odesa, was appointed as temporary chargé d'affaires and arrived in Kyiv. He met with Oleksander Shulhyn, the General Secretary of International Affairs of Ukraine.

== See also ==
- Constitution of the Ukrainian People's Republic
- Universals
  - First Universal of the Ukrainian Central Council
  - Second Universal of the Ukrainian Central Council
  - Third Universal of the Ukrainian Central Council
- Unification Act
- Russian Constituent Assembly
- Ukrainian Constituent Assembly
