= List of archives in Ukraine =

This is a list of archives in Ukraine.

== Archives in Ukraine ==
- National Archives of Ukraine

=== Central State Archives ===
- Central State Archives of Supreme Bodies of Power and Government of Ukraine
- Central State Archives of Public Organizations of Ukraine
- Central State Historical Archives of Ukraine in Kyiv - CDIAK (ЦДІАК)
- Central State Historical Archives of Ukraine in Lviv - TsDIAL (ЦДІАЛ)
- Central State CinePhotoPhono Archives of Ukraine
- Central State Scientific and Technical Archives of Ukraine
- Central State Archives Museum of Literature and Art of Ukraine
- Central State Archives of Foreign Archival Ucrainica
- Central State Electronic Archives of Ukraine
- State Archives Research Library of Kyiv

=== Main supporting institutions ===
- Ukrainian Research Institute of Archival Affairs and Records Management
- Science-reference library of the Central State Archives of Ukraine
- State Center for documents conservation of the National Archive Fund
- Main publishing periodical "Visnyk" (Herald)

=== Regional State Archives ===
- State Archives in the Autonomous Republic of Crimea - DAARC (ДААРК) - in Simferopol
- State Archives of Vinnytsia Oblast - DAVO (ДАВО) - in Vinnytsia
- State Archives of Volyn Oblast - DAVoO (ДАВоО) - in Lutsk
- State Archives of Dnipropetrovsk Oblast - DADnO (ДАДнО) - in Dnipro
- State Archives of Donetsk Oblast - DADoO (ДАДоО) - moved (without its documents) to Kostiantynivka in 2014, documents mostly looted by Russian occupiers
- State Archives of Zhytomyr Oblast - DAZO (ДАЖО) - in Zhytomyr
- State Archives of Transcarpathian Oblast - DAZkO (ДАЗкО) - in Uzhhorod
- State Archives of Zaporizhzhya Oblast - DAZpO (ДАЗпО) - in Zaporizhzhia
- State Archives of Ivano-Frankivsk Oblast - DAIFO (ДАІФО) - in Ivano-Frankivsk
- State Archives of Kyiv Oblast - DAKO (ДАКО) - in Kyiv
- State Archives of Kirovohrad Oblast - DAKrO or DAKIRO (ДАКрО) - in Kropyvnytskyi
- State Archives of Luhansk Oblast - DALuO (ДАЛуО) - moved (without its documents) to Sievierodonetsk in 2014, documents mostly looted by Russian occupiers
- State Archives of Lviv Oblast - DALO (ДАЛО) - in Lviv
- State Archives of Mykolayiv Oblast - DAMO (ДАМО) - in Mykolaiv
- State Archives of Odesa Oblast - DAOO (ДАОО) - in Odesa
- State Archives of Poltava Oblast - DAPO (ДАПО) - in Poltava
- State Archives of Rivne Oblast - DARO (ДАРО) - in Rivne
- State Archives of Sumy Oblast - DASO (ДАСО) - in Sumy
- State Archives of Ternopil Oblast - DATO (ДАТО) - in Ternopil
- State Archives of Kharkiv Oblast - DAHO (ДАХО) - in Kharkiv
- State Archives of Kherson Oblast - DAHeO (ДАХеО) - in Kherson, approximately fifty percent of the documents (and most of the WWII era documents) looted by retreating Russian occupiers in November 2022
- State Archives of Khmelnytskyi Oblast - DAHmO (ДАХмО) - in Khmelnytskyi
- State Archives of Cherkasy Oblast - DACHkO (ДАЧкО) - in Cherkasy
- State Archives of Chernivtsi Oblast - DACHvO (ДАЧвО) - in Chernivtsi
- State Archives of Chernihiv Oblast - DACHhO (ДАЧгО) - in Chernihiv
- State Archives of the City of Kyiv - DAK (ДАК) in Kyiv
- State Archives in the City of Sevastopol - DAS (ДАС) in Sevastopol

=== Other ===
- Vernadsky National Library of Ukraine

== See also ==
- List of archives
- List of libraries in Ukraine
- List of museums in Ukraine
- Culture of Ukraine
