= Nadia Lipes =

Ukrainian writer (born 1976)

Nadia Ihorivna Lipes
- Надія Ігорівна Ліпес
- Born: 24 December 1976 (age 49); Balakliia, USSR
- Citizenship: Israel, Ukraine
- Education: International Solomon University
- Writing career
- Language: Hebrew, Russian, Ukrainian, Spanish and English
- Genres: genealogy, history
- Website: lipesdatabase.com

Nadia (Sarah-Beila) Ihorivna Lipes (Ukrainian: Надія Ігорівна Ліпес, Russian: Надежда Игоревна Липес; born 24 December 1976, Balakliia, Ukrainian SSR) is a Ukrainian writer, historian, licensed tour guide, public figure. She is considered one of the leading genealogists in the post-Soviet states.

== Biography ==
Born into a Jewish family, in 1997 she immigrated to Israel. She attended the International Solomon University, where she studied Judaics and Sociology. In 2004, she returned to Kyiv and worked as a realtor before the 2008 financial crisis. That year, she founded courses for Jewish guides in Ukraine, and since 2009 has been organizing tourist trips. Concurrently she has been working with archival documents, and searching and restoring genealogical data. She gives lectures in Ukraine and in many other countries of the world, in particular in the United States, Israel, Germany. She speaks Hebrew, Russian, Ukrainian, Spanish and English.

== Activities ==
Since 2007 she has been engaged in the protection and documentation of old Jewish cemeteries, having taken numerous photographs of Jewish headstones of historical, cultural and artistic value. She has written numerous studies of archival documents. In 2013, in the State Archives of the Kyiv region, she discovered lists of Jews in Justingrad who were victims of pogroms, her ancestors being among the victims.

Lipes is also the author of numerous works on the history of Jews in the Russian Empire and Ukraine and studies on Jewish pogroms during the revolution and the Civil War in Ukraine. She is the founder of a memorial site with a list of victims of pogroms, which she finances at her own expense. She has restored or supplemented the family trees of celebrities such as Dustin Hoffman, Isaac Babel, Leonid Utyosov, Vladimir Vysotsky, Mishka Yaponchik, David Margolin, David Hofstein, Simcha Lieberman, Menachem Mendel Schneerson and other famous personalities. She has indexed more than a million archival records from the times of the Russian Empire related to Jewish genealogy from the archives of Ukraine for her websites.

In September 2017, she participated in the international program conference 'Riga Forum – Holocaust and Contemporary Radicalism' in Riga with more than 100 participants from 17 countries. From July to August 2019, she spoke at the International Conference on Jewish Genealogy in Cleveland. In the summer of 2020, she participated in the opening of a memorial monument to those who died in Tetiiv.

== Publications ==
- Липес Н. И. А вы по национальности? Astroprint, 2017. ISBN 978-966-927-307-9.
- Липес Н. И. Советские документы. Что, где, зачем. Astroprint, 2018. ISBN 978-966-927-348-2.
- Липес Н. И. Досоветские документы. Что, где, зачем, 1786—1917. Astroprint, 2019. ISBN 978-966-927-482-3.
- Липес Н. И. Погромы: неудобная правда, 1917-1921. Астропринт, 2021. ISBN 978-966-927-806-7.
- Липес Н. И. «Грабармия» Деникина в записках врача Лазаря Билинкиса. Лехаим № 11 (355), 28 октября 2021.
- Lipes N. I. Kiev Archives: Documentation of World War I Jewish Refugees. Avotaynu Volume XXX, Number 2, Summer 2014.
- Lipes N. I. Russian Empire Army Census of 1875 For the Territory of Ukraine. Avotaynu Volume XXX, Number 3, Fall 2014.
- Lipes N. I. Jewish Berdichev as Seen Through Two Archival Collections. Avotaynu Volume XXX, Number 4, Winter 2014.
- Lipes N. I. Archival Records from the Russian Courts, Police, Notaries and Other State Agencies. Avotaynu Volume XXXI, Number 1, Spring 2015.
- Lipes N. I. Y-DNA Helps Trace a Litvak's Roots Back to Eretz Yisrael Two Thousand Years Ago. Avotaynu Volume XXXI, Number 2, Summer 2015.
- Lipes N. I. Hidden Jewish History: The Expulsion of Jews from Kiev in 1827 and the Story of the Rabbis. Avotaynu Volume XXXI, Number 3, Fall 2015.
- Lipes N. I. Archival Records of Jewish Refugees to the USSR (1939—1940). Avotaynu Volume XXXI, Number 4, Winter 2015.
- Lipes N. I. Hard-to-Find Family History: A Story About Some «Illegitimate» Jewish Children. Avotaynu Volume XXXII, Number 1, Spring 2016.
- Lipes N. I. What May be Learned from the Personal Files of Jewish Students in the Russian Empire. Avotaynu Volume XXXII, Number 2, Summer 2016.
- Lipes N. I. Your Connection to Rabbi Levi Yitzhak from Berdichev. Avotaynu Volume XXXII, Number 4, Winter 2016.
- Lipes N. I. Developing an Index of Jewish Records for Old Kiev Guberniya. Avotaynu Volume XXXIII, Number 2, Summer 2017.
- Lipes N. I. A Journey to One’s Roots. Avotaynu Volume XXXIII, Number 4, Winter 2017.
- Липес Н. И. Погромы: неудобная правда. 1917–1921 : документальная повесть — Одесса : Астропринт, 2021. — 348 с. — (Серия «Генеалогия для чайников»). ISBN 978-966-927-806-7
- Липес Н. И. Нетипичный Холокост : документальная повесть часть 1 : Немецкая зона оккупации — Одесса : Астропринт, 2025. — 300 с. — (Серия «Генеалогия для чайников»). ISBN 978-617-8515-09-6
