= Unification Act =

1919 unification treaty of Ukrainian republics

Universal of the Directory of the Ukrainian People's Republic
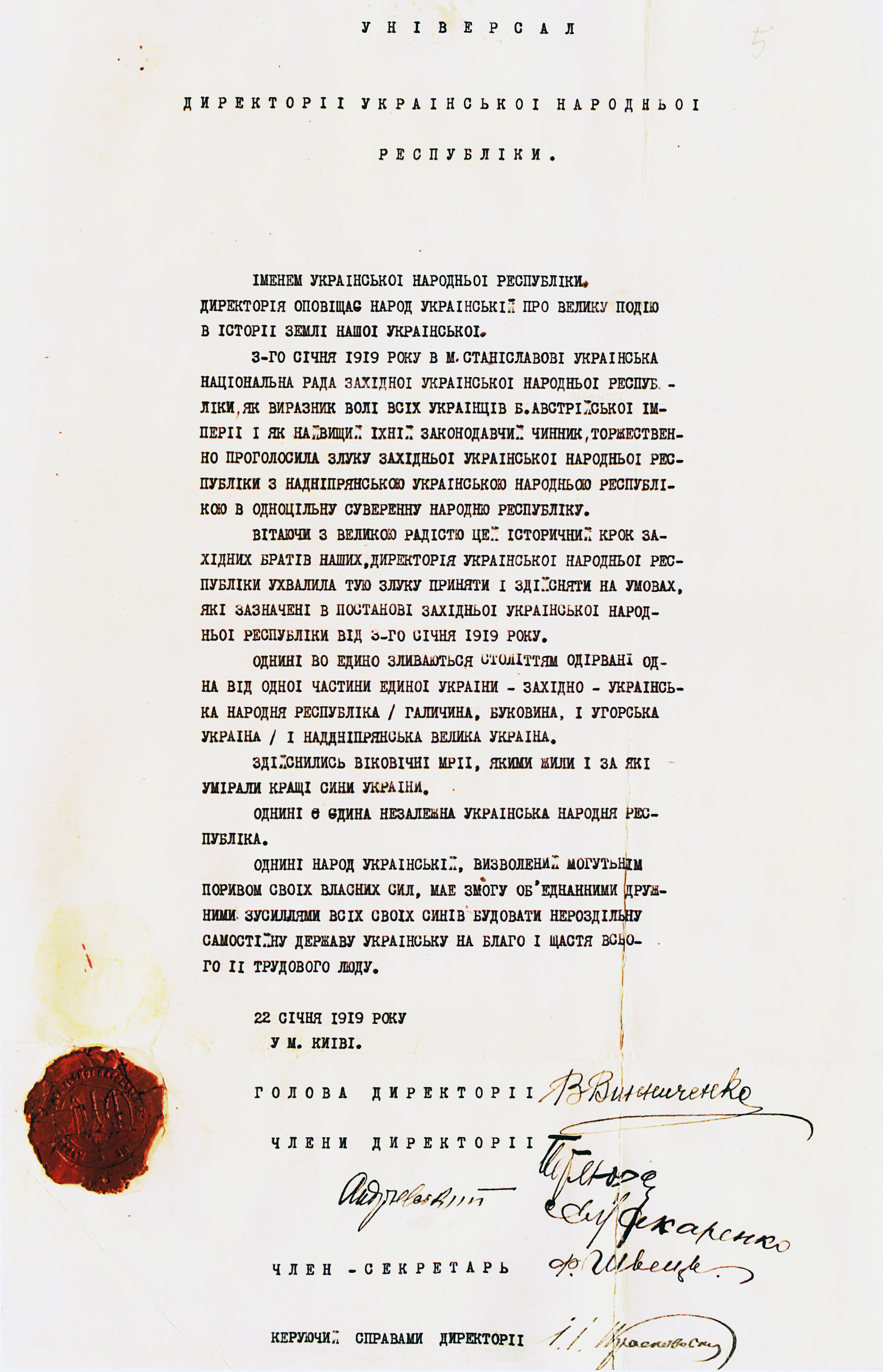
- A copy of the Act Zluky, signed on 22 January 1919
- Presented: 22 January 1919
- Ratified: from the moment of signing
- Repealed: 20 December 1919
- Location: Sofia Square, Kyiv, Ukrainian People's Republic
- Signatories: Central Rada
- Purpose: Unification of the Ukrainian People's Republic and the West Ukrainian People's Republic into one state

Full text
- Translation:Unification Act at Wikisource

The Unification Act (Ukrainian: Акт Злуки, romanized: Akt Zluky, IPA: [ˈɑkt ˈzlukɪ]; or Велика Злука, Velyka Zluka, IPA: [ˈwɛlɪkɐ ˈzlukɐ], literally "Great Union") was an agreement signed by the Ukrainian People's Republic and the West Ukrainian People's Republic in Sophia Square in Kyiv on 22 January 1919. Since 1999, it is celebrated every year as the Day of Unity of Ukraine to commemorate the signing of the treaty; it is a state holiday in Ukraine, though not a public holiday.

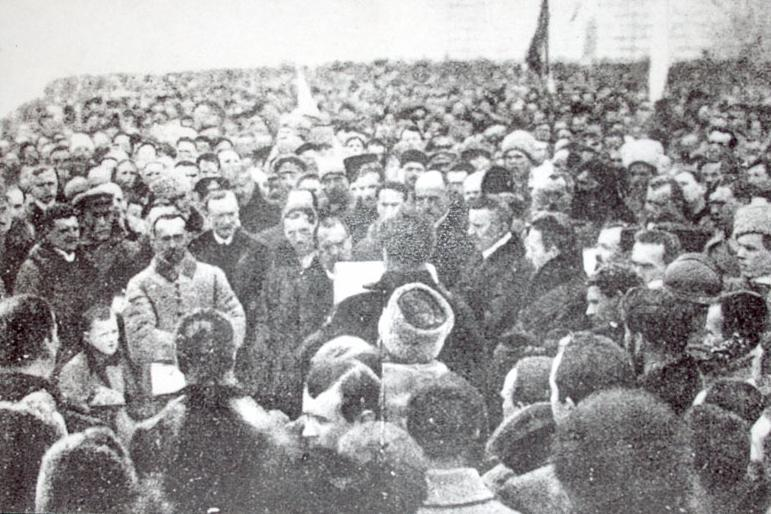
The signing of the Act Zluky, on Sophia Square in Kyiv

== History ==
On 22 January 1918, the Central Rada (Council) of Ukraine, with its Fourth Universal, proclaimed the Ukrainian People's Republic an independent, sovereign state of the Ukrainian people. On 1 December 1918, a pre-accession agreement on the further unification of the two republics into a single state was concluded between the Ukrainian People's Republic (UPR) and the Western Ukrainian People's Republic (ZUNR) in Fastiv.

On 3 January 1919, the parliament of the Western Ukrainian People's Republic in Stanislaviv ratified it and sent a delegation to negotiate with the UPR government, and on 22 January 1919, the UPR Directory issued a universal declaring the creation of a single and independent UPR. On the same day, in a solemn atmosphere, it was announced on Sophia Square in Kyiv in presence of around 100,000 people.

As per the treaty, Halychyna would become an autonomous part of Ukraine. The Act of Unification was effectively denounced after representatives of the Galician Army unilaterally signed the Zyatkivtsi Agreement with the Volunteer Army on 6 November 1919, without taking into account the opinion of the UPR government. The agreement on the cessation of hostilities put the Galician army at the disposal of General Anton Denikin. These agreements were re-approved in Odesa on 17 November 1919, with the leadership of the Novorossiya region of the Armed Forces of Southern Russia, and the treaty was ratified in Vinnytsia on 19 November, after which it was implemented.

On 2 December 1919, representatives of the Ukrainian People's Republic and Poland signed a draft declaration in Warsaw, according to which the Ukrainian People's Republic gave Poland Chełm Land, Polissia, Podlachia, Western Volhynia, and Eastern Halychyna. On 4 December 1919, the official diplomatic delegation of the Western Ukrainian People's Republic (S. Vytvytskyi, A. Horbachevskyi, M. Novakivskyi) announced to the UPR Embassy in Warsaw and the Government of the Republic of Poland that the Western Ukrainian People's Republic UPR with the Polish government. On 20 December 1919, the authorized dictator Yevhen Petrushevych convened a meeting of the ZUNR government in Vienna, at which a decision was made to unilaterally repeal the Act of Unification.

However, Ukraine was unable to gain independence. Instead, the Ukrainian SSR of the Soviet Union was established, comprising most of the territory of the Ukrainian People's Republic. The territories of the West Ukrainian People's Republic became mostly part of Poland. In 1939 the territories of both became part of the Ukrainian SSR. The unification action of 1919 left a deep mark in the historical memory of the Ukrainian people. This was evidenced by the January events of 1939 in Carpatho-Ukraine.

== Participants ==
=== On the part of the Ukrainian People's Republic ===
Symon Petliura, Volodymyr Vynnychenko, Chairman of the Directorate, Fedir Shvets, Panas Andriievskyi.

=== On the part of the West Ukrainian People's Republic ===
Vasyl Stefanyk (leader), Lonhyn Tsehelskyi, Dmytro Levytskyi, Andrii Shmhigelskyi, Tymotei Starukh.

== Commemoration ==
=== 71st anniversary ===
Over 300,000 Ukrainians participated in the human chain on 21 January 1990.

To mark the 71st anniversary of the signing of the Act Zluky in 1990, over 300,000 Ukrainians created a human chain (approx. 482 km (300 mi) long) from the capital Kyiv to the western Ukrainian city of Lviv on 21 January 1990. The chain, the largest public demonstration in Ukraine since the beginning of Glasnost, was funded by the People's Movement of Ukraine (Rukh) and was partly inspired by the Baltic Way which had taken place the previous year.

The idea to organize the action was proposed by Rukh secretary Mykhailo Horyn, who acted as the event's coordinator together with his brother Bohdan Horyn, head of the Lviv regional organization of Ukrainian Helsinki Union. For the first time since the period of the Ukrainian People's Republic, the blue and yellow national flag was raised; due to the government ban on production and display of such flags, they were made by participants of the demonstration themselves.

Ukraine's Communist leadership was informed about the planned human chain, and initially put no obstacles into its organization, with head of the Communist Party's ideology department Leonid Kravchuk assuring Mykhailo Horyn that he was not against the action. However, after realizing the scale of the event, authorities started attempting to disrupt it by blocking provision of buses to its participants, confiscating textiles used to produce flags from shops and starting repair works on road sections where the human chain was planned to pass. Nevertheless, the action achieved success, and another city, Ivano-Frankivsk, was added to the human chain, as it had served as the capital of Western Ukrainian Republic at the time of the Unification Act. Other cities in which the human chain was organized included Ternopil, Rivne and Zhytomyr. Over 10,000 militsiya officers were sent by authorities to observe the action. The total length of the chain reached up to 700 km. According to a report sent to the Central Committee of the Communist Party of Ukraine by Interior Minister Ivan Hladush, 840 buses and 23,000 private cars were used to transport the event's participants.

Outside of the chain's main route, meetings dedicated to the 71st anniversary of the Unification Act took place in Transcarpathia, Volyn, Poltava and Kherson, Mykolaiv, Chernihiv and other regions of Ukraine, as well as in Crimea. The action lasted for over an hour, ending with big demonstrations in Kyiv's Sophia Square, moderated by Dmytro Pavlychko, and near the Ivan Franko monument in Lviv. Except of its political role, mobilizing Ukrainian patriotic organizations in advance to the 1990 Ukrainian Supreme Soviet election, the human chain also had an educational meaning, spreading information about the Unification Act among the Ukrainian masses.

=== Unity of Ukraine Day ===
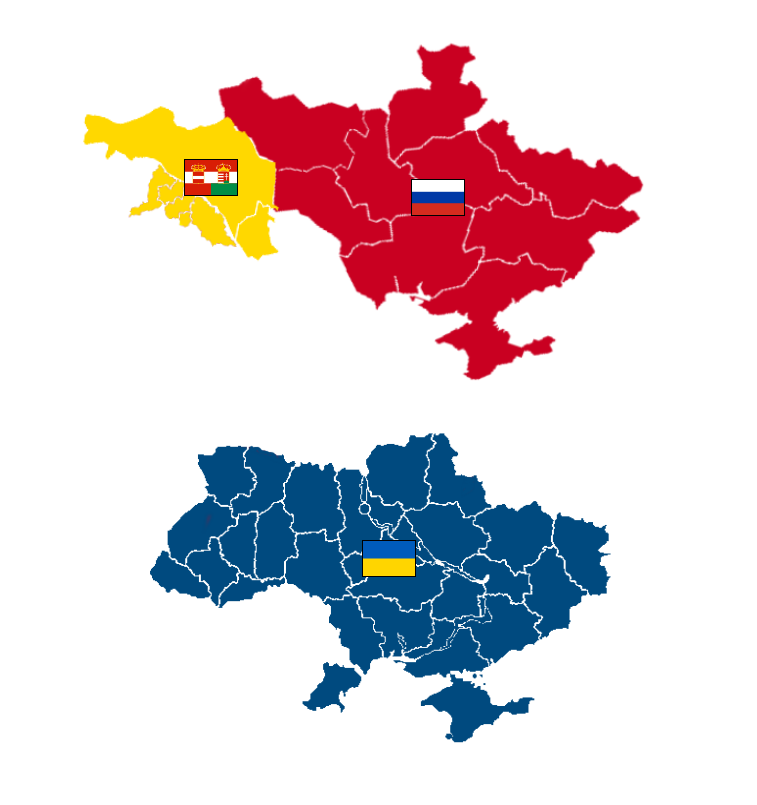
Modern-day borders of Ukraine compared to former subdivisions of the Russian and Austria-Hungarian empires.

On 21 January 1999, the President of Ukraine Leonid Kuchma decreed the creation of the holiday "Unity of Ukraine Day" (Ukrainian: День Соборності України, romanized: Den Sobornosti Ukrainy), a government holiday, celebrated every year on 22 January to mark the political and historical significance of the 1919 agreement. It is not a public holiday.

In December 2011, President Viktor Yanukovych caused public controversy when he merged the "Day of Freedom" into this day, naming it officially the "Day of Unity and Freedom of Ukraine" (Ukrainian: День Соборності та Свободи України, Den' Sobornosti ta Svobody Ukrayiny).

The "Day of Freedom" was created in 2005 by President Viktor Yushchenko, Yanukovych's opponent, to be celebrated on 22 November in commemoration of the Orange Revolution. President Yanukovych stated he changed the day of celebration because of "numerous appeals from the public". Mid-October 2014 President Petro Poroshenko undid Yanukovych's merging when he decreed that 21 November will be celebrated as "Day of Dignity and Freedom" in honour of the Euromaidan-protests that started on 21 November 2013.

In a Facebook post on the occasion of the 102nd Unity of Ukraine Day celebrating the 1919 symbolic unification of the Ukrainian People's Republic and the West Ukrainian People's Republic, the pro-Russian former Prime Minister of Ukraine Mykola Azarov claimed that instead, the 1939 Soviet annexation of Eastern Galicia and Volhynia should be recognized as the day Ukraine gained "the real unity of Ukraine".

According to Azarov "many Ukrainians, do not know these facts, because now the Soviet period of Ukraine is smeared with black paint, and Bandera is glorified and glorified." Azarov also claimed that prior to 1939 Western Ukraine became part of the USSR "there was no industry or social infrastructure. And look at what has been created in Western Ukraine for several decades of independence."

On Unity Day 2024 President Volodymyr Zelenskyy signed a Presidential Decree "regarding the resolution of the issues of Ukrainian historical territories" now under Russian control beyond Ukraine's (international recognized) official borders; like the Kuban, Belgorod and Rostov Oblasts. These territories were claimed by the Ukrainian People's Republic government (1917–1921) and who before Holodomor and the Russification efforts of the 1930s of the Soviet Union hosted huge Ukrainian populations. According to the decree Ukraine should strive "to preserve the national identity of Ukrainians" in these regions of Russia.

== See also ==
- Constitution of the Ukrainian People's Republic
- Universals
  - First Universal of the Ukrainian Central Council
  - Fourth Universal of the Ukrainian Central Council
  - Second Universal of the Ukrainian Central Council
  - Third Universal of the Ukrainian Central Council
