= History of Ukraine-Rusʹ =

Monographic series by Mykhailo Hrushevskyi

- Author: Mykhailo Hrushevsky
- Original title: Історія України-Руси
- Language: Ukrainian
- Genre: History
- Publisher: Literaturno-naukovy visnyk of Shevchenko Scientific Society
- Publication date: Serialised; first 1898
- Publication place: Ukrainian People's Republic, USSR, Ukraine
- English publication date: 1997–2014
- Media type: Print

History of Ukraine-Rusʹ (Ukrainian: Історія України-Руси, romanized: Istoriia Ukrainy-Rusy) is a monumental 10-volume monographic series by Mykhailo Hrushevsky. The work is generally considered a magnum opus and a foundation of the contemporary history of Ukraine. It covers the period from ancient times to the second half of the 17th century. It was written between 1895 and 1933.

== Contents ==
1. The first volume covers the socio-economic, political and cultural processes that took place in Ukraine from ancient times to the beginning of the 11th century.
2. The second volume analyzes the international situation, political and economic development of the Kyiv state and its individual lands – Kyiv, Turov-Pinsk, Chernihiv, Pereiaslav, Volhynia, Pobuzhzhia, Galicia, Hungarian Rus', and the Steppe in the 11–13th centuries.
3. The third volume covers the history of Galicia and Volhynia from the formation of the state of Prince Roman Mstyslavych to the conquest of the territory by the Kingdom of Poland, as well as the situation of the Dnieper region under the rule of the Golden Horde khans.
4. The fourth volume covers the political history of the Ukrainian lands as part of the Grand Duchy of Lithuania and the Kingdom of Poland during the 14th century and up to 1569.
5. The fifth volume provides a general overview of the socio-political evolution of Ukrainian lands in the 14–17th centuries, considers the status of the population (gentry and magnates, peasants, burghers, clergy), the history of local and church government, the emergence of the Ukrainian Greek Catholic Church.
6. The sixth volume completes the second cycle of the fundamental series, dedicated to the Lithuanian–Polish era. It outlines the development of urban handicrafts and agriculture, trade, national relations, culture and life from the time of incorporation of Ukrainian lands into the Grand Duchy of Lithuania and the Polish–Lithuanian Commonwealth to the 1920s. The 17th century is the times of the Cossacks. Particular attention is paid to the topics of education, the creation of fraternities, and the fight against the Commonwealth.
7. The seventh volume begins the third cycle of the History of Ukraine-Rus', dedicated to the Cossack era. It describes the beginnings of the Cossacks from the end of the 14th century until the beginning of the 17th century, when it transformed from a purely domestic phenomenon into the Cossack Hetmanate, and became the leader of the national liberation struggles of the Ukrainian people. The volume covers the key events of the first quarter of the 17th century, the participation of the Cossacks in the religious struggle, the Khotyn War and the restoration of the Orthodox hierarchy in 1620–1621, the naval campaigns and military actions of Hetman Sagaidachny against the Turks and Tatars. It outlines the ties of the Cossacks with the Kyiv cultural and social movement of that time, which was headed by Metropolitans Job Boretsky and Petro Mohyla.
8. The eighth volume is devoted to the second quarter of the 17th century and consists of three parts. The first covers the years 1626–1638, from the Kurukovo campaign, which did not live up to the plans and hopes of the Cossacks of the first decades of this century, to the defeat at Kumeiki. The second part tells about Ukrainian life during the so-called Golden Peace (1638–1648) and the beginning of the Khmelnytsky Uprising under the leadership of Bohdan Khmelnytsky. The third part covers the course of events in the first two years of the Khmelnytsky region (1648–1650) and gives an assessment of the Treaty of Zboriv between Ukraine and Poland.
9. The ninth volume covers the events of the Khmelnytsky region in 1650–1657. The first half of this volume covers the period from 1650 (march on Moldova) to 1654 (Pereyaslav Treaty). The second half of this volume covers the events of Khmelnytsky region from 1654 (after the Pereyaslav Treaty) to 1657 (death of Khmelnytsky).
10. The last book covers the period from 1657 (after the death of Bohdan Khmelnytsky) to the events of 1658 (the Treaty of Hadiach). The history of the Swedish–Ukrainian union, Pushkar's revolt, the restoration of the Crimean–Ukrainian union, the conflict with Moscow and the Treaty of Hadiach are covered.

== Publications ==
In 1916 Hrushevskyi published a German-language translation of the first volume of History of Ukraine Rus' in Lviv.

In English: History of Ukraine-Rus' : vols. 1–10 (in 12 books) / M. Hrushevsky. Edmonton, Toronto: Canadian Institute of Ukrainian Studies Press, 1997–2014. (The Hrushevsky Translation Project). Translators and editors vary. Includes bibliographical references and indexes.

== Reviews ==
- Halperin, Charles J. (2000). "History of Ukraine-Rus′. Volume One. From Prehistory to the Eleventh Century (review)". Kritika: Explorations in Russian and Eurasian History. 1 (1): 195–202. doi:10.1353/kri.2008.0121. ISSN 1538-5000. S2CID 161268180.
- Szegvári, Tamás Csaba (2003). "Review of History of Ukraine-Rus' Volume 1. From Prehistory to the Eleventh Century". Canadian Slavonic Papers. 45 (1/2): 232–234. ISSN 0008-5006. JSTOR 40870510.
- Font, Márta (2018-10-01). "Mykhailo Hrushevsky, History of Ukraine-Rus', vol. 3: To the Year 1340". Speculum. 93 (4): 1214–1216. doi:10.1086/699883. ISSN 0038-7134.
- Himka, John-Paul (December 2000). "History of Ukraine Rus', Volume Seven: The Cossack Age to 1625". Canadian Journal of History. 35: 535–538. doi:10.3138/cjh.35.3.535.
- Stevens, Carol B. (2019). "Review of "History of Ukraine-Rus' Vol. 4: Political Relations in the 14th–16th Centuries" by Mykhailo Hrushevsky". Seventeenth-Century News. 77. ISSN 0037-3028.
- Stevens, Carol B. (2016). "A review of "History of Ukraine-Rus'. Vol. 10: The Cossack Age, 1657-1659" by Mykhailo Hrushevsky". Seventeenth-Century News. 74. ISSN 0037-3028.

== See also ==
- Bibliography of Ukrainian history
- Bibliography of the history of the Early Slavs and Rus'
