= Tetyana Baranova =

Ukrainian lawyer (1955–2022)

- Тетяна Баранова

Head of the State Archive Service of Ukraine
- In office 2014–2019
- Preceded by: Olha Hinzburh
- Succeeded by: Anatoliy Khromov

Personal details
- Born: 26 October 1955 Kyiv, Ukrainian SSR, Soviet Union
- Died: 8 January 2022 (aged 66)
- Party: United Centre

Tetyana Ivanivna Baranova (Ukrainian: Тетяна Іванівна Баранова; 26 October 1955 – 8 January 2022) was a Ukrainian lawyer. She was head of the State Archive Service of Ukraine from 2014 to 2019.
