= Universals (Central Rada) =

Ukrainian legal acts

Little Council of the Central Rada of Ukraine
- Long title: Universals of the Central Rada of Ukraine

Universals of the Central Rada (Council) of Ukraine (Ukrainian: Універсали Української Центральної Ради, romanized: Universaly Ukrainskoi Tsentralnoi Rady) are legal acts or declarations issued by the Central Rada (Council) of Ukraine in 1917–1918. These documents marked the main stages of the development of the nascent Ukrainian state, from the proclamation of its autonomy to the declaration of full independence.

== General outlook ==
Act number	Adaptation	Details
First	23 June [O.S. 10 June] 1917	Declared the announcement of Ukraine national autonomy as part of Russian Republic
Second	16 July [O.S. 3 July] 1917	Compromise with the Russian Provisional Government announcing that the final form of Ukraine autonomy would be decided by the Russian Constituent Assembly
Third	20 November [O.S. 7 November] 1917	Announced Ukrainian People's Republic: Ukraine does not completely break away from Russian Republic
Fourth	22 January [O.S. 9 January] 1918	Declared independence of Ukraine

== I Universal ==
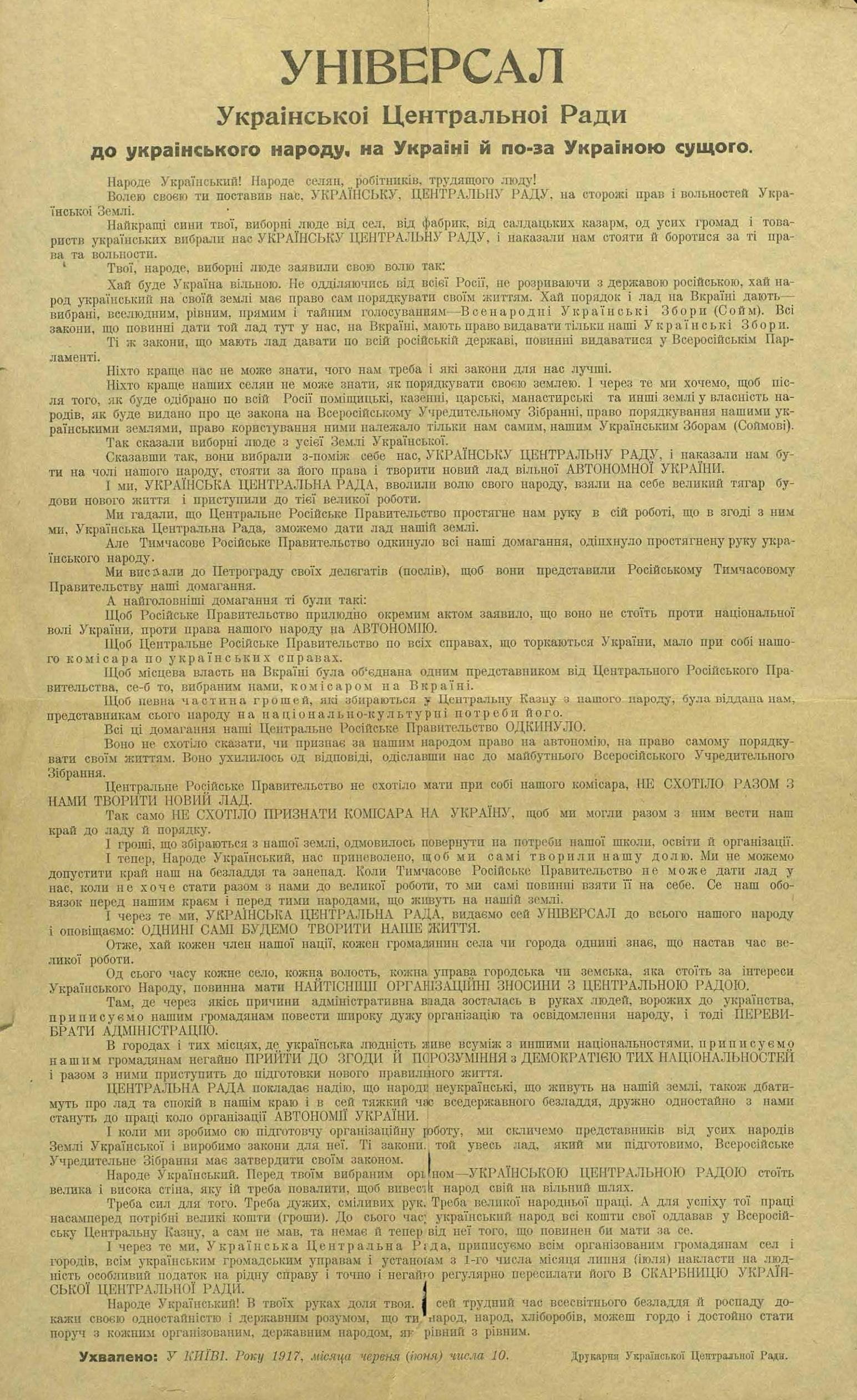
The First Universal of the UCR (Document TsDAVO of Ukraine).

On June 23, 1917 the I Universal declared the autonomy of Ukraine "from now on we alone will create our life". It was an answer of the Central Council of Ukraine to the Provisional Government of Russia for its negative attitude towards the autonomy of Ukraine. According to the I Universal, "not separating from the whole Russia ... Ukrainian people must alone govern their lives", and laws must be approved by the All-National Ukrainian Assembly. The author of the I Universal was Volodymyr Vynnychenko. After the declaration of autonomy, on June 28, 1917 there was created the General Secretariat of Ukraine.

=== Terms ===
1. Proclamation of Ukraine's autonomy within Russian Republic;
2. The source of power in Ukraine is the Ukrainian people;
3. The administration of Ukraine should carry out the national Ukrainian assembly (seimas or parliament);
4. The Ukrainian Assembly adopts laws, and only these laws are valid on the territory of Ukraine;
5. It was hoped that non-Ukrainian peoples living in Ukraine would build an autonomous system together with Ukrainians.

The First Universal was announced at the Second All-Ukrainian Military Congress;

After the Provisional Government refused to grant autonomy to Ukraine in May 1917 (not immediately, but in the long run), the Central Rada, based on the principle of "neither rebellion nor obedience", decided to adopt the First Universal ("To the Ukrainian people, on Ukraine and beyond its existence "). Given the multinational composition of Ukraine, Universal called on Ukrainian citizens to agree and understand. The Ukrainian Central Rada assumed responsibility for the current state of affairs in the country, additional fees were introduced from the population in favor of the Rada, but no demand was made to stop payments to the all-Russian budget. Following the proclamation of autonomy on 28 June [O.S. 15 June] 1917, a government (General Secretariat) was formed. In response to the First Universal, on 29 June [O.S. 16 June] 1917, the Provisional Government issued an appeal to the Citizens of Ukraine, in which it invited Ukrainian citizens to develop zemstvo and city self-government.

== II Universal ==
The Second Universal of the Ukrainian Central Council

16 July [O.S. 3 July] 1917 recorded the consequences of agreements between the UCR and the Provisional Government: the latter recognized the UCR and the General Secretariat as a regional body of Ukraine and at the same time the General Secretariat became a body of the Provisional Government. For its part, the UCR recognized the All-Russian Constituent Assembly, and before convening it undertook not to take unauthorized steps towards the realization of Ukraine's autonomy.

=== Terms ===
1. The Central Rada should be replenished with representatives from other peoples living in Ukraine;
2. The enlarged Central Council shall establish a General Secretariat, the composition of which shall be approved by the Provisional Government;
3. The Central Rada begins drafting a law on the autonomous system of Ukraine, which must be approved by the constituent assembly. Until the approval of this law, the UCR undertakes not to exercise the autonomy of Ukraine;
4. The formation of the Ukrainian army is carried out under the control of the Provisional Government.

II Universal proclaimed at the session of the Ukrainian Central Council.

The decisions of the First Universal in Petrograd were received with concern. Given the political crisis caused by mass demonstrations, the defeat of the Russian army on the Southwest Front, and the consequent loss of Galicia, the Provisional Government could not use force alone, as Ukrainianized units and a large part of Ukraine's population could defend the Central Rada. In addition, the armed conflict could lead to a split among Russia's political forces. In this regard, the Provisional Government entered into negotiations with the Central Rada, for which a government delegation consisting of O. Kerensky, M. Tereshchenko and I. Tsereteli went to Kyiv on June 28. As a result of the negotiations, a compromise was reached. In particular, the Provisional Government recognized the theoretical possibility of obtaining autonomy for Ukraine, and the Central Rada undertook independently (without a decision of the All-Russian Constituent Assembly) not to introduce autonomy; The Provisional Government allowed the creation of national Ukrainian military units, but they had to be organized with the permission and under the control of the Provisional Government, while the Ukrainian units remained part of a single Russian army. These conditions were to be fixed in a special resolution of the Provisional Government of the Universal of the Central Council. The compromise reached caused a government crisis in Russia, as a sign of protest against any concessions to Ukrainians, three cadet ministers left the government, but the decision was still adopted. On July 3, 1917, the Provisional Government sent a telegram to Kyiv with a resolution "On the National and Political Situation of Ukraine," the content of which coincided with the content of the Universal II prepared for proclamation. On the same day, at a solemn meeting of the Ukrainian Central Council II, the Universal was read (published in Ukrainian, Russian, Hebrew and Polish). Universal stated that "we, the Central Rada, have always stood for not separating Ukraine from Russia." The General Secretariat was declared a "body of the Provisional Government", and its composition is approved by the Provisional Government. The need to replenish the Council with representatives of other nationalities living in Ukraine was recognized. The possibility of seconding representatives of Ukraine to the cabinet of the Minister of War and the General Staff was considered a military issue. The formation of Ukrainian troops should be carried out under the control of the Provisional Government.

== III Universal ==
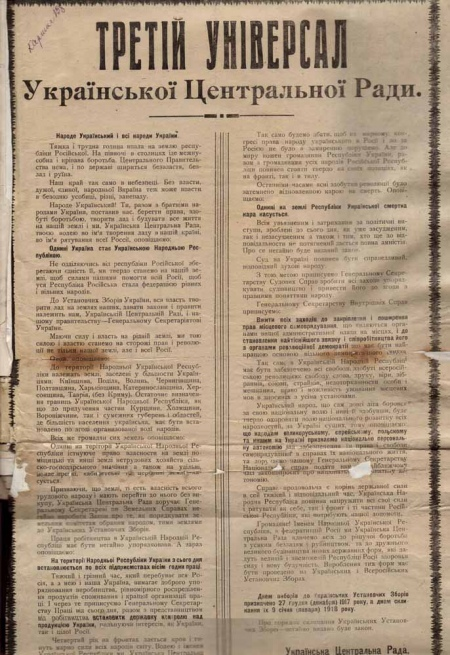
The Third Universal of the Ukrainian Central Council

20 November [O.S. 7 November] 1917 proclaimed the Ukrainian People's Republic (UPR), formally without severing federal ties with Russian Republic, and democratic principles: freedom of speech, press, religion, assembly, unions, strikes, inviolability of person and home; declared national autonomy for minorities (Russians, Poles, Jews), abolished the death penalty, as well as the right of private ownership of land and recognized it as the property of the whole people without ransom, established an 8-hour working day, announced local government reform, set January 9, 1918 as a day elections to the Ukrainian Constituent Assembly, which were to be convened on January 22, 1918.

=== Terms ===
1. Ukraine is proclaimed the Ukrainian People's Republic, not separating from the Russian Republic;
2. Until the constituent assembly in Ukraine, all power belongs to the UCR and the General Secretariat;
3. The right of private ownership of land is abolished;
4. The UCR begins peace talks with the German Empire and its allies;
5. Democratic freedoms are being introduced: freedom of speech, freedom of the press, etc.;
6. An 8-hour working day is introduced;
7. State control over production is established;
8. Elections to the All-Ukrainian Constituent Assembly are scheduled for December.
9. Judicial reform.
10. Amnesty for political prisoners.

== IV Universal ==
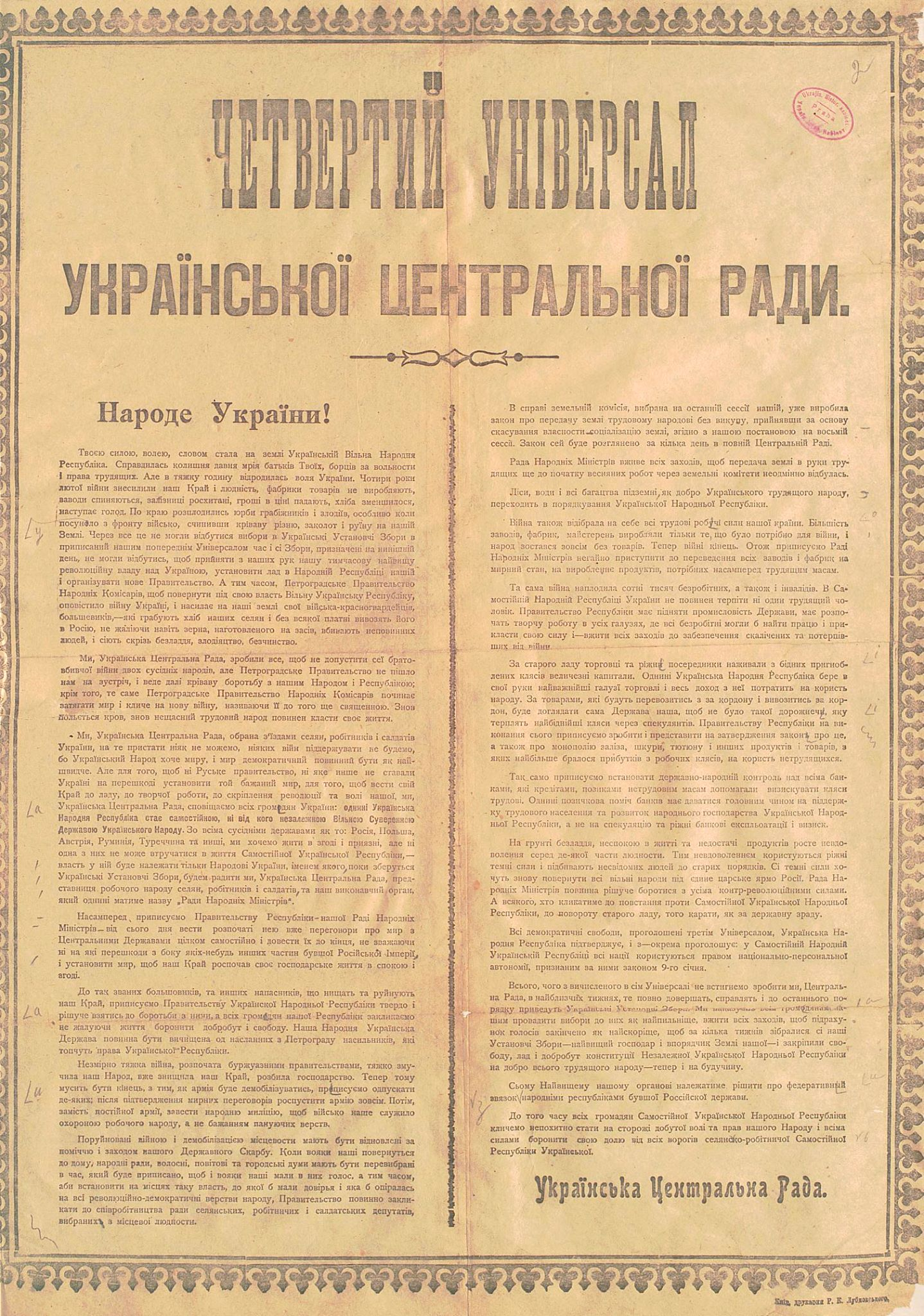
The Fourth Universal of the Ukrainian Central Council

On 25 January 1918 (backdated 22 January 1918) IV Universal declared independence of Ukraine so the Ukrainian People's Republic could conclude an international treaty with the Central Powers. It also condemned Bolshevik aggression. It replaced the standing army with police, instructed to hold elections of people's councils — volost, povit and local, established a monopoly on trade, control over banks, confirmed the law on the transfer of land to peasants without redemption, taking as a basis the abolition of property and socialization of land. Instructed the Council of People's Ministers to continue the negotiations with the Central Powers and bring them to the signing of peace; called on all citizens of the UPR to fight the Bolsheviks.

=== Terms ===
1. The UPR is proclaimed an independent, free sovereign state of the Ukrainian people;
2. The UPR seeks to live in peace and harmony with all neighboring countries;
3. Power in Ukraine belongs to the people of Ukraine, on whose behalf, until the Ukrainian Constituent Assembly convenes, the Central Rada will rule;
4. The Bolshevik policy leading to the civil war was severely criticized;
5. The UCR undertakes to fight against Bolshevik supporters in Ukraine;
6. The UCR undertook to immediately begin peace talks with Germany;
7. The UCR plans to carry out land reform in the interests of the peasants;
8. The state must establish control over trade and banks

Universals III and IV were put to the vote by members of the Minor Council, which gave them the meaning of law.

The Directory of the Ukrainian People's Republic did not maintain the practice of declaring Universals. Instead of Universals, they began to issue declarations.

After the October Revolution in Petrograd, on the territory of Ukraine, the Bolsheviks established Soviet power in some frontline cities, and a civil war broke out between supporters of Soviet power and supporters of the Provisional Government. Initially, the Central Rada took a neutral position, but soon took active action and was able to establish its power over most of Ukraine. In November, the supremacy of the Central Rada was recognized by the Kyiv, Katerynoslav, Odesa, and Poltava committees of the RSDLP (B), a number of Soviets of Workers 'and Soldiers' Deputies of the cities of Ukraine, and all peasant Soviets. Continuing its state-building line, the Ukrainian Central Rada (UCR) on 20 November [O.S. 7 November] 1917, 1917 approved the Third Universal, in which it proclaimed the Ukrainian People's Republic (UPR) as a federation of free peoples, without formally severing federal ties with Russia, and democratic principles: freedom of speech, press, religion, assembly, unions, strikes, inviolability of person and home; declared national autonomy for minorities (Russians, Poles, Jews), abolished the death penalty, as well as the right of private ownership of land and recognized it as the property of the whole people without ransom, established an 8-hour working day, announced local government reform. 9 provinces come under the power of the Central Rada: Kyiv, Podil, Volyn, Chernihiv, Poltava, Kharkiv, Ekaterinoslav, Kherson and Tavriia (excluding Crimea). The fate of some regions and provinces adjacent to Russia (Kursk, Kholm, Voronezh, etc.) was supposed to be decided in the future. Elections to the All-Ukrainian Constituent Assembly were scheduled for December, before the election of which all power belonged to the Central Rada and the General Secretariat.

However, Ukraine still did not claim absolute sovereignty, as it was assumed that the October events in Petrograd were a conspiracy that would soon be eliminated. All laws, resolutions and orders of the Provisional Government remained in force on the territory of Ukraine, unless they were repealed by the Central Council or the General Secretariat. All collective government agencies and all officials appointed by the Provisional Government for future changes in the legislation of the Ukrainian People's Republic remained.

== See also ==
- Constituent Charter of the Belarusian People's Republic
- Unification Act
