= State Archives of Vinnytsia Oblast =

State archival institution in Vinnytsia, Ukraine

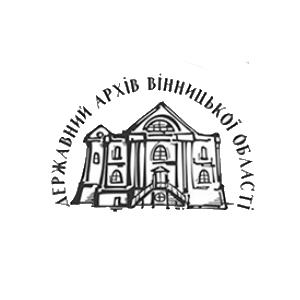
- 49°13′59″N 28°28′35″E
- Location: 17 Soborna St., Vinnytsia, 21050; 12 Pyrohov St., Vinnytsia, 21050, Ukraine
- Established: 1 April 1922

Collection
- Items collected: 1,481,140
- Size: 5,617 funds

Other information
- Director: Yuriy Lehun

The State Archives of the Vinnytsia Oblast (Ukrainian: Державний архів Вінницької області (ДАВіО for short)) is an archive of the Ukrainian State Archive Service located in Vinnytsia, Ukraine, housing documents from the Vinnytsia Oblast. The archive contains holdings from the 18th century to the early 21st.

== History ==
In 1920, the Podolia Regional Archive was established in Vinnytsia, consisting of three departments: archival, library, and bibliographic. In September of that year, the Podolsk Regional Archives was transferred to the Podolsk Provincial Archival Administration, which disbanded in February 1921. On April 1, 1922, the administration was reformed under the Soviet Union for the purpose of storing and archiving pre-revolutionary documents.

Under July 24, 1925, following the liquidation of the Podolia Governorate, the administration transferred its functions to a temporary archival commission, which distributed the holdings to three administrations in Vinnytsia, Mohyliv-Podilskyi, and Tulchyn. The archive became a part of the Vinnytsia District Archival Administration.

By the end of 1931, the local archival administration was reorganized into the Vinnytsia State Historical Archives. In February of the following year, the archive was renamed to the Vinnytsia Regional Historical Archive, with order to the newly created Vinnytsia Regional Archival Administration. In 1938, the archive fell under jurisdiction of the NKVD of the Ukrainian SSR. Since 1944, the archive has been referred to as the State Archives of the Vinnytsia Oblast.

In December 1988, the archival department of the regional executive committee was liquidated. The functions of the archival management for the holdings of the region were transferred to the State Archives.

The main building for the archive was formerly used as a Jesuit monastery, rebuilt in the 19th century.

== Holdings ==
- 5,617 funds holding 1,459,997 items from 1726 to 2004
- 3,730 collected scientific and technical document collections from 1825 to 2002
- 22 film document collections from 1972 to 1988
- 33,704 collections of photographic collections from 1890 to 2002
- 213 collections of phonographic documents from 1961 to 1994
