= State Archives of Khmelnytskyi Oblast =

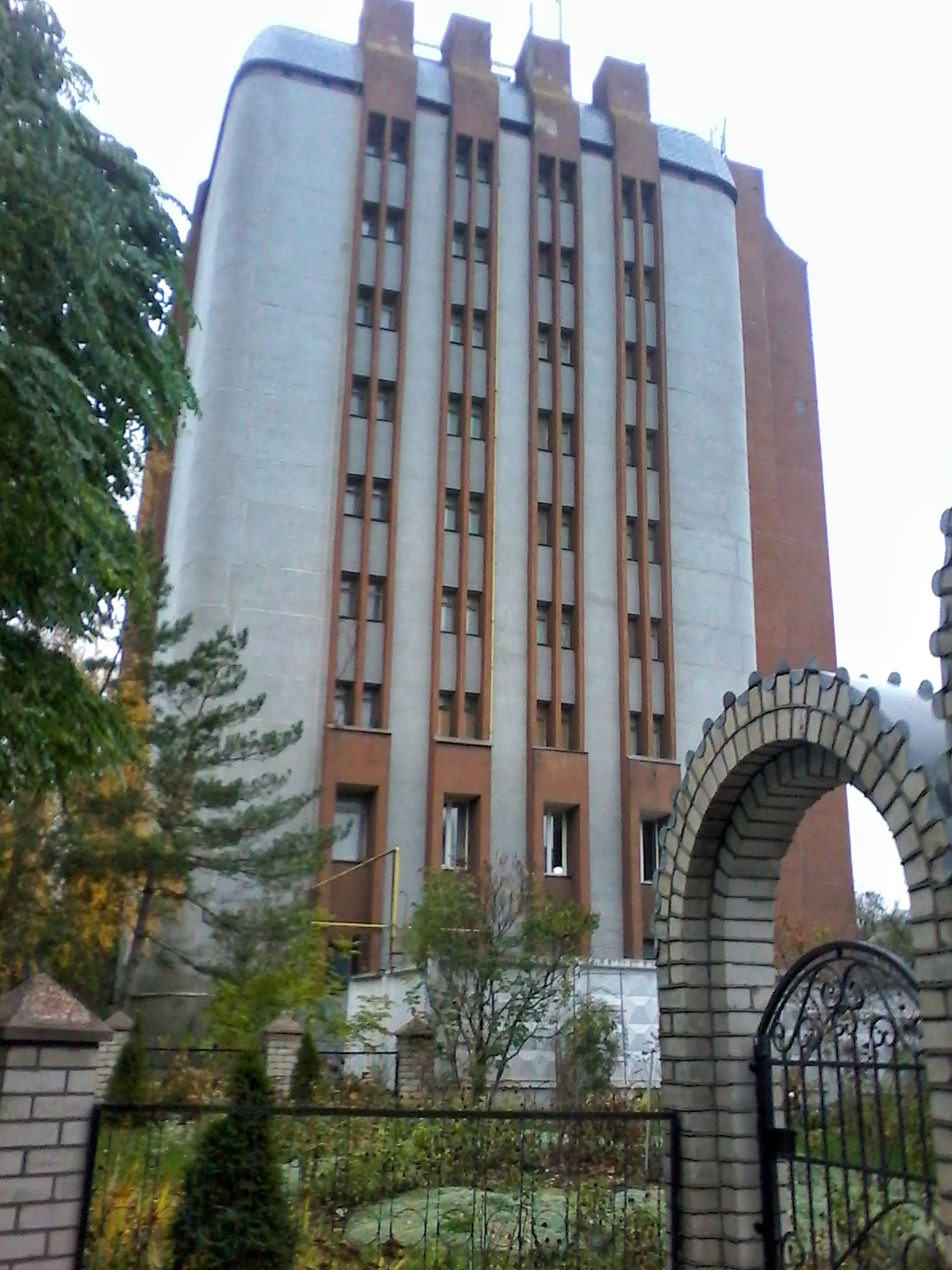
- Archive Building in 2017
- 49°25′04″N 26°58′56″E
- Location: Khmelnytskyi, Ukraine
- Established: 1 April 1922; 104 years ago

Collection
- Size: 1,944,953 total items

Other information
- Director: Kateryna Burduvalis
- Website: dahmo.gov.ua

The State Archives of Khmelnytskyi Oblast is a state archival institution in Khmelnytskyi, Ukraine.

== History ==
The Kamianetz District Archival Department was established in April 1922. In 1925, it was consolidated into the Kamianets District Archival Administration. In 1930, the district was later merged into the Kamianets-Podolskyi Local Archival Administration.

On March 1, 1932, the KPLAD was renamed to the Kamianets-Podilsky Regional State Historical Archive. It was re-established later in that year as the Vinnytsia Regional Executive Committee, with sub-levels in Vinnytsia, Kamianets-Podilsky, Proskurov, Berdychiv, and Uman.

In 1947, the regional archive was transferred to the authority of the Ministry of Internal Affairs of the Ukrainian SSR. On January 16, 1954, the archive was renamed to the Khmelnytskyi Regional State Archives in Kamianets-Podilsky, with the location being dropped from the official name in 1980. The archive was moved from Kamianets to Khhmelnytskyi in April 1990.

== Holdings ==
- 8,076 holdings composed of 1,944,953 storage units of contents between the years of 1717-2008
- 258 units of storage for scientific and technical documentation of post-Stalin Soviet Era
- 8 units of storage for film from 1994 to 1993
- 39,943 units of storage for photographic documents from 1917 to 2008
- 424 units of phonographic documents from 1957 to 2008
- 247 units for video documentation from 1990, 1993, 1996-2007

== See also ==
- Holdings of the DAKhMO Archive
- Available Holdings of DaKhMO on Ukrainian Wikisource
