= State Archival Service of Ukraine =

- Державна архівна служба України (in Ukrainian)
- Logo of the State Archival Service

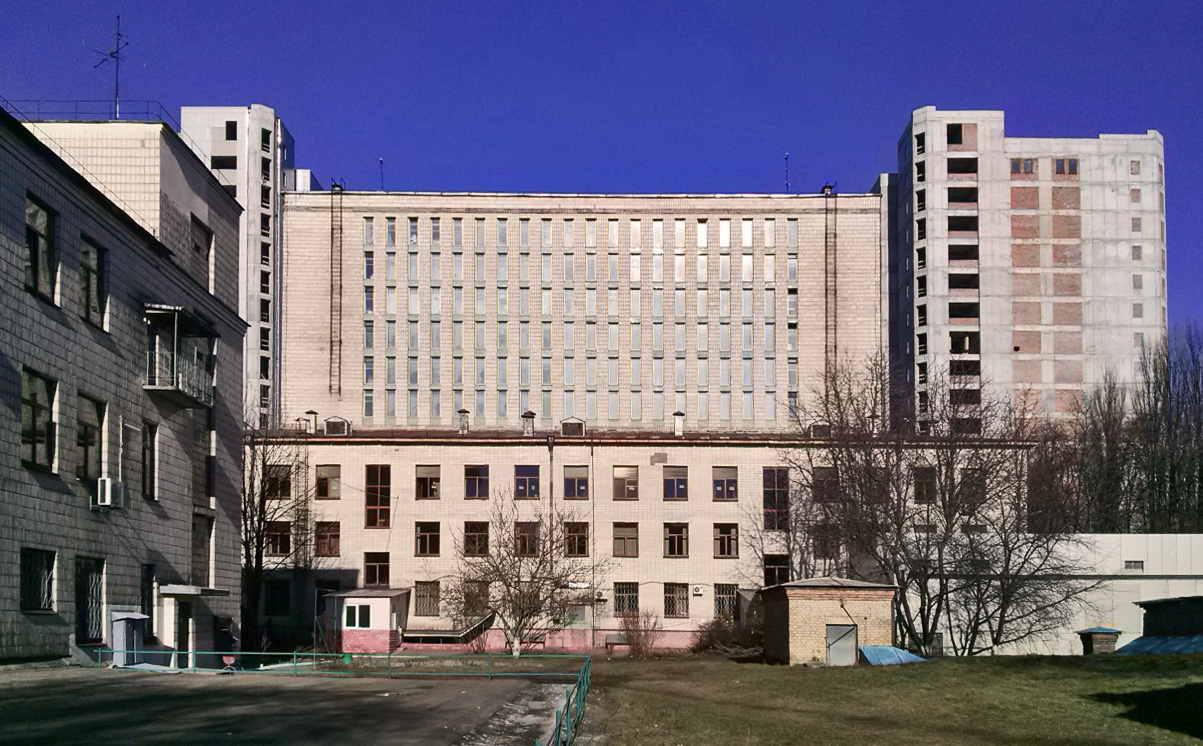
- The State Archival Service building on 25 Solomianska Street, Kyiv

Agency overview
- Formed: 1923
- Headquarters: 25 Solomianska Street, Kyiv; 50.41984°N 30.49077°E
- Agency executive: Anatolii Khromov, Chairman
- Parent department: Ministry of Justice
- Website: www.archives.gov.ua

The State Archival Service of Ukraine (Ukrainian: Державна архівна служба України, romanized: Derzhavna arkhivna sluzhba Ukraini), or abbr. Ukrderzharkhiv (Ukrainian: Укрдержархів), is a Ukrainian government agency that implements state policy regarding the keeping of archives and record, function of state system of documentation security fund as well as an inter-trade coordination on matters within its competence. In 2010, the service was reorganised based on the State Committee of Archives (DerzhKomArchiv). The agency is part of the Ministry of Justice of Ukraine since 1999. Between 1947 and 1960, it belonged to the NKVD.

Ukrderzharkhiv has been a member of the International Council on Archives since 1956.

== Description ==
Ukrainian archives were previously among the least accessible in Europe, as the archives did not publish their catalogs online, and there was no state program for this as of 2017. Archives were also underfunded, and often overloaded with visitors. Waiting time to access documents in reading room could reach several weeks and occasionally months. Most of the staff speak Ukrainian or Russian only. Some of the Western archives have personnel that can speak Polish and occasionally Romanian, Moldavian and English. So far it seems that the State Archives of Odesa Oblast is the only one where personnel can speak English.

In 2003, Ukraine had lost one of the most valuable collections of Ukrainian Podilia 1795–1900 during the fire in Kamianets-Podilskyi archive. In 2014, Ukraine lost the Crimea, Donetsk and Luhansk archives to the Russian invasion; however the latter two archives had a small amount of their materials rescued by fleeing archivists, who put some of the most important materials in the trunks of their cars as they evacuated west.

== Digitization projects ==
Over the years there have been some international programs for scanning collections. The United States Holocaust Memorial Museum has had some successful programs.

The non-profit organization FamilySearch did archival scanning work in Ukraine from 1993 to 2011, but the contract was dropped by the government of Ukraine when president Viktor Yanukovych came to power. His new chief of Ukrderzharkhiv and a member of the Communist Party of Ukraine, Olha Hinzburh, proclaimed that "Ukrainian archives are to open for everyone". During 18 years of successful collaboration FamilySearch digitised many collections and made them available online.

However, under President Volodymyr Zelenskyy and his government, FamilySearch was again given permission to start scanning projects throughout the country, working in a handful of archives branches circa 2021. The collaboration has continued since the Russian invasion of Ukraine, with more archives branches signing contracts in 2023 and 2024. Today Ukraine is one of FamilySearch's largest national scanning projects in the world.

== Corruption ==
Ukrainian archives have in the past struggled with poor state support and strong corruption. Putting documents online will drop illegal income for many archives officials, and so they would block requests to scan materials, or would scan but not publish the materials.

Most of the present archives stored in old buildings without fundamental storage facilities. Some of the buildings do not even have heating in winter.

There have been a number of rumors about stealing precious documents from state archives. Some Ukrainian historical records have been seen available on international auctions like eBay. Most notable cases were in Lviv and Kharkiv archives. It is not clear of how many documents were stolen and absent at the moment.

== Previous names ==
- 1921–1923: Main Archive Administration of the People's Commissariat of Education of the Ukrainian SSR
- 1923–1938: Central Archive Administration (Central Executive Committee of Ukraine)
- 1938–1939: under direct jurisdiction of the Main Archive Administration of the People's Commissariat of Internal Affairs of the Soviet Union
- 1939–1941: Archive department of the People's Commissariat of Internal Affairs of the Ukrainian SSR
- 1941–1941: Archive Administration of the People's Commissariat of Internal Affairs of the Ukrainian SSR
- 1941–1947: Administration of State Archives of the People's Commissariat of Internal Affairs of the Ukrainian SSR
  - 1941–1943: evacuation to the city of Zlatoust
- 1947–1960: Administration of State Archives of the Ministry of Internal Affairs of the Ukrainian SSR
- 1960–1974: Archive Administration of the Council of Ministers of the Ukrainian SSR
- 1974–1992: Main Archive Administration of the Council of Ministers of the Ukrainian SSR
- 1992–1999: Main Archive Administration of the Cabinet of Ministers of Ukraine
- 1999–1999: Main Archive Administration of Ukraine
- 1999–2010: State Committee of Archives of Ukraine
- 2010–present: State Archival Service of Ukraine

== Heads ==
- 1948–1969: Semen Pilkevych
- 1969–1988: Oleksandr Mityukov
- 1988–1996: Borys Ivanenko
- 1996–1998: N. Kystruska
- 1998–2002: Ruslan Pyrih
- 2002–2006: Hennadiy Boryak
- 2006–2008: Olha Hinzburh
- 2008–2009: Oleksandr Udod
- 2009–2014: Olha Hinzburh
- 2014–2019: Tetyana Baranova
- 2019–present: Anatoliy Khromov

== See also ==
- List of archives in Ukraine
- List of national archives
