= 1918 Ukrainian Constituent Assembly election =

Canceled elections after the Russian Revolution of 1917

Elections to the Ukrainian Constituent Assembly (Ukrainian: Вибори до Українських Установчих Зборів) were never finished as a result of events in the Russian Revolution of 1917 and the following.

== Organization ==
There were 301 seats contested to the Ukrainian Constituent Assembly in 13 electoral districts starting on 9 January 1918 [O.S. 27 December 1917]. The elections were proclaimed on November 20 by the Third Universal of the Central Rada of the Ukrainian People's Republic. The Universal proclaimed that the Constituent Assembly would convene on 22 January [O.S. 9 January] 1918. The elections were conducted by the Electoral Bureau of the General Secretary of Internal Affairs directed by Mykhailo Kovenko.

The Universal proclaimed that the Constituent Assembly's 301 deputies were to be elected by a direct universal, equal and secret vote on the basis of proportional representation of 1 deputy per 100,000 constituents. Male and female citizens aged 20 and over who have attained the right to vote were allowed to participate in the elections.

== Preparation ==
Right before elections the Russian Social Democratic Labor Party tried to sabotage the elections through another coup-d'etat that was scheduled to take place on December 24 to establish the Soviet power in Ukraine. However, that attempt was effectively extinguished, all Bolshevik military formations were disarmed, and sent by train to the Soviet Russia including the 2nd Guard Corps led by Yevgenia Bosch that was stopped near Zhmerynka en route to Kiev in support of the mutiny. On December 30 the government of Russia (Sovnarkom) issued an ultimatum to reinstate legal rights of Bolshevik military formations in Ukraine, which was ignored.

== Results ==
According to the results, 171 of the 301 deputies were elected in regions where the Bolsheviks were not in power. Over 70 percent of the total votes cast were for Ukrainian political parties while only 10 percent went to the Bolsheviks. Following political turmoil, the Ukrainian Constituent Assembly never convened and the Central Council took on its responsibilities. The elections were paused due to the invasion of Russia and the chaos that was spread as the result of it. The Central Rada announced that it will act as the legislative body until the Assembly will be convened.
