= Mykhailo Hrushevsky =

Ukrainian historian and politician (1866–1934)

- Михайло Грушевський
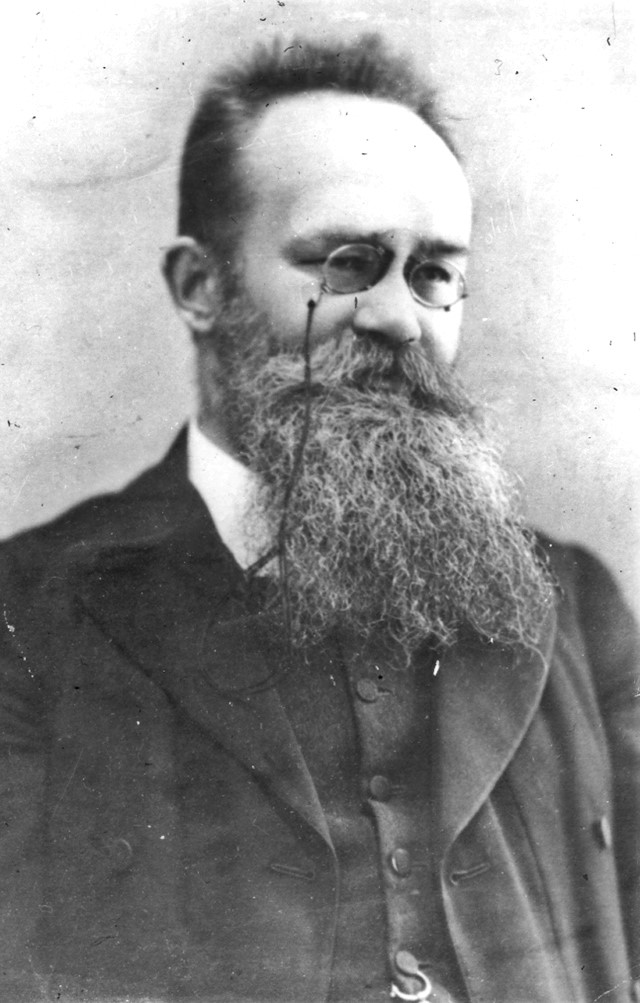
- Photo portrait of Hrushevsky, c. 1910-1917

President of the Central Council of Ukraine
- In office 28 March [O.S. 15 March] 1917 – 29 April 1918
- Preceded by: Position established Volodymyr Pavlovych Naumenko (acting)
- Succeeded by: Position abolished Pavlo Skoropadskyi (as Hetman of Ukraine)

Shevchenko Scientific Society Chairman
- In office 1897–1913
- Preceded by: Oleksandr Barvinsky
- Succeeded by: Stepan Tomashivskyi

Personal details
- Born: Mykhailo Serhiiovych Hrushevsky; 29 September [O.S. 17 September] 1866 Chełm, Congress Poland, Russian Empire (now Poland)
- Died: 24 November 1934 (aged 68) Kislovodsk, North Caucasus Krai, Russian SFSR, Soviet Union (now Russia)
- Party: Ukrainian National Democratic Party; Ukrainian Socialist-Revolutionary Party
- Spouse: Maria-Ivanna Hrushevska
- Children: Kateryna Hrushevska
- Education: Saint Volodymyr University, Kyiv
- Occupation: Academic, historian
- Academic title: Magister of History
- Dissertation: "Bar starostvo. Historical outline."
- Magnum opus: History of Ukraine-Rus'

Mykhailo Serhiiovych Hrushevsky (Note: Also Hrushevskyi in standard romanization) (Ukrainian: Михайло Сергійович Грушевський, romanized: Mykhailo Serhiiovych Hrushevskyi, Ukrainian pronunciation: [mɪˈxai̯lo serˈɦʲijowɪd͡ʒ‿ɦrʊˈʃɛu̯sʲkɪi̯]; 29 September [O.S. 17 September] 1866 – 24 November 1934) was a Ukrainian academician, politician, historian and statesman who was one of the most important figures of the Ukrainian national revival of the early 20th century. Hrushevsky is often considered the country's greatest modern historian, the foremost organiser of scholarship, the leader of the pre-revolution Ukrainian national movement, the head of the Central Rada (Ukraine's 1917–1918 revolutionary parliament), and a leading cultural figure in the Ukrainian SSR during the 1920s.

== Biography ==
=== Early life ===
Mykhailo Hrushevsky was born on 29 September 1866 to a Ukrainian noble family in Chełm, in Congress Poland, an autonomous polity in the Russian Empire. His father Serhii Fedorovych Hrushevsky was a son of an Orthodox priest from the vicinity of Chyhyryn, who had come to Chełm to teach Russian language at a Greek Catholic gymnasium in 1865. Serhii Fedorovych's father, Fedir Hrushevsky was a highly-decorated official (his awards included the two Orders of Saint Anna and the Bronze Cross, and a title of nobility). Later, upon enrolling into Saint Volodymyr University, in Kyiv, Mykhailo received blessings from his grandfather who had graduated from its History Department.

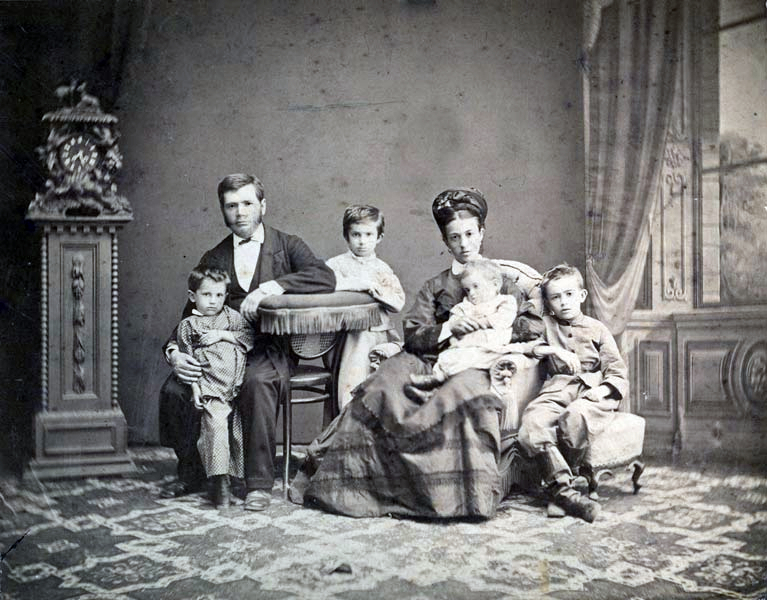
Hrushevskyi family photographed around 1876, with Mykhailo sitting on the right

Mykhailo's mother, Glafira Zakharivna Oppokova, was born into a family of Orthodox priests in the village of Sestrynivka, Berdychiv povit, Podillia Governorate. Due to specifics of Serhii's employment, the family frequently changed their place of residence: two years after Mykhailo's birth, in 1868, Serhii was employed as a teacher at a classical gymnasium in Łomża; one year later the family moved to Kutaisi, and in 1870 to Stavropol. Despite having been educated in Polish and Russian herself, Glafira worked to teach her children Ukrainian language. Mykhailo spoke warmly of his parents and described them as real patriots of Ukraine, who managed to instill a sense of national pride in their children.

In 1880 at the age of 14, Mykhailo was sent by his parents to Tiflis, where he attended a local school. During that time he developed an interest for Ukrainian history and literature. Every year the family would spend their vacations in Ukraine, which allowed the boy to purchase the latest books on those topics. An especially important role on the formation of young Hrushevskyi's views was played by historical and ethnographic works by Mykola Kostomarov, Panteleimon Kulish, Volodymyr Antonovych, Apollon Skalkowski, Mykhailo Maksymovych and Amvrosy Metlinsky, as well as articles on Ukrainian history, literature and folklore published in Kievskaia starina magazine. During that period Hrushevskyi developed an ambition to become a leader of patriotic Ukrainians.

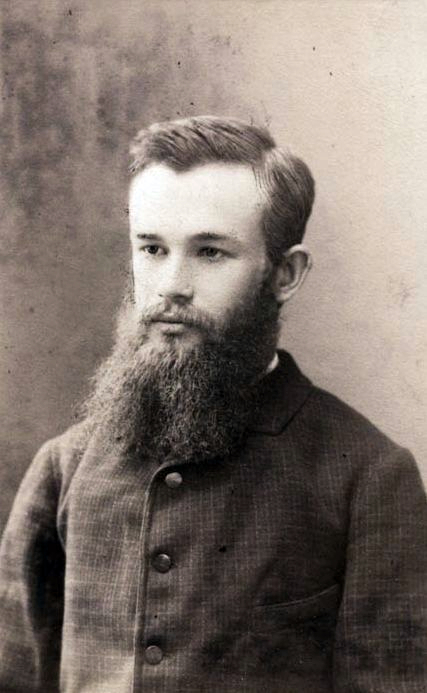
Hrushevskyi as a student in Kyiv, 1889

While still studying at the classical gymnasium in Tiflis, Hrushevsky started writing belles-lettres, and in 1885 one of his stories appeared in the newspaper Dilo. After finishing his courses one year later, Hrushevsky enrolled into Kyiv University, studying history under the mentorship of Volodymyr Antonovych. During his studies in Kyiv he established ties with members of the Old Hromada and Ukrainophile students of Kyiv Orthodox Seminary. His first scientific paper dedicated to the history of Southern Rus was published in 1890. During that period Hrushevsky co-operated with the almanac Kievskaia starina and Shevchenko Scientific Society. His master paper dedicated to the history of Bar starostwo saw the light in 1894. In the same year, at the recommendation of Antonovych, Hrushevsky was appointed professor of the newly created chair of Ukrainian history at the University of Lviv.

=== Activities in Galicia ===
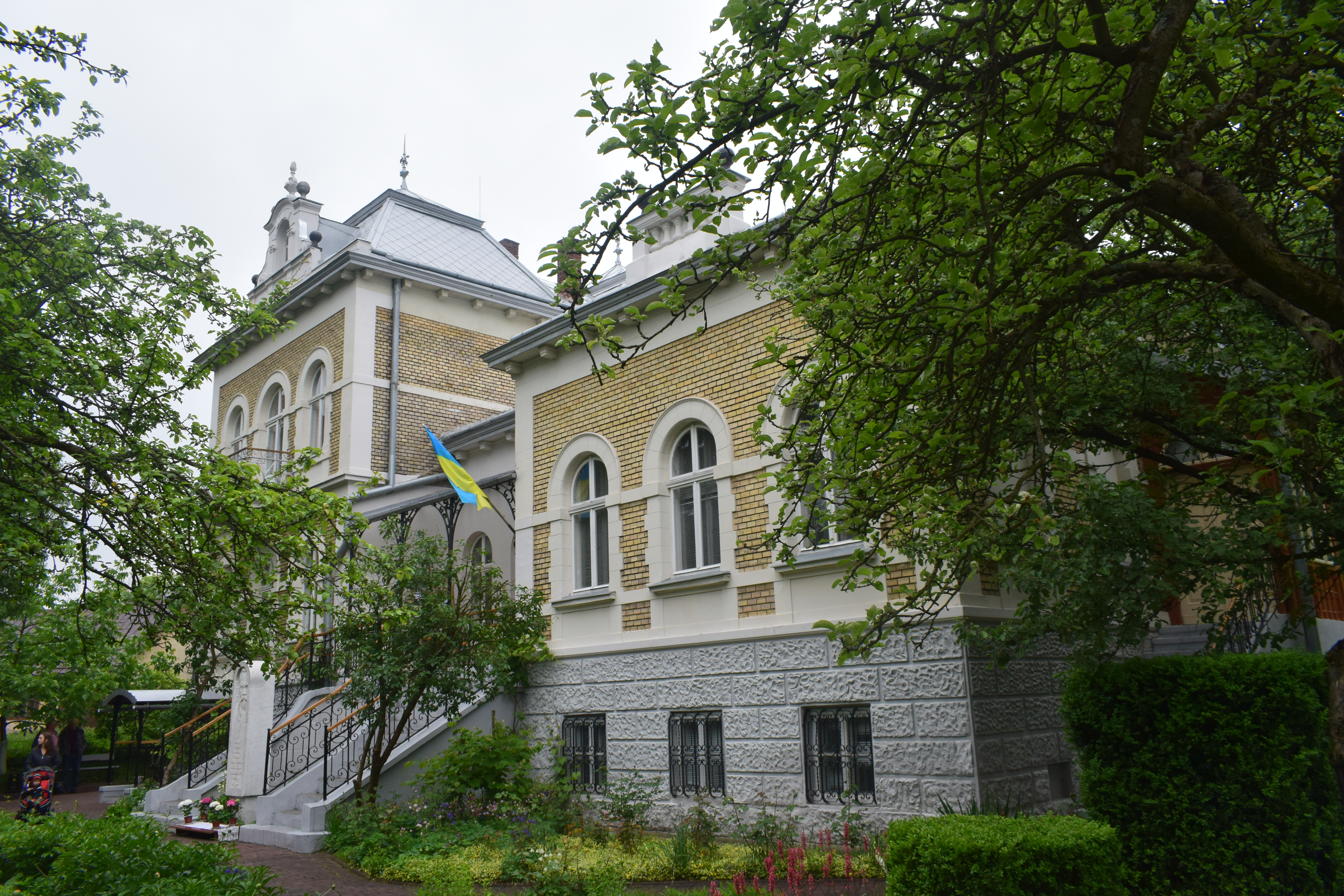
Hrushevskyi villa in Lviv, now a memorial museum

After moving to Lviv, Hrushevskyi further involved himself with the Shevchenko Scientific Society and was appointed head of its Historical-Philosophical Section. In 1897 he was elected the organization's president and started reorganizing the society, turning it into an institution resembling an academy of sciences, collecting funds, founding a library, a museum and an archaeographical commission and developing press organs. One of Hrushevsky's close collaborators in Lviv was Ukrainian poet Ivan Franko; after 1902 the two men became neighbours, constructing their villas on a common land plot on the outskirts of Lviv. Hrushevsky also contributed to the development of Ukrainian schooling and worked on the organization of a Ukrainian university in Lviv. In 1898 he initiated the republishing of Ivan Kotliarevsky's Eneida, and in the next year co-founded the Ruthenian-Ukrainian Publishing Society.

It was in Austrian Galicia that Hrushevsky first became active in politics, speaking out against Polish political predominance and Ruthenian particularism and supporting a national Ukrainian identity that would unite both eastern and western parts of the country. In 1899, he was a cofounder of the Galician-based National Democratic Party, which looked forward to eventual Ukrainian independence. Among Hrushevskyi's close friends in Lviv were painter Ivan Trush and lawyer Severyn Danylovych.

=== Return to Kyiv and exile ===
After the easing of restrictions on Ukrainian public life in the aftermath of the Russian Revolution of 1905, Hrushevsky returned to Russian-ruled Ukraine, although he continued to teach at Lviv University until 1914. After 1905 he advised the Ukrainian Club in the Russian State Duma, or Parliament. In Kyiv Hrushevsky became a cofounder of the Ukrainian Scientific Society, and established a number of peasant-oriented newspapers. In 1908 he became one of the founding members of the Society of Ukrainian Progressists.

Soon after the start of the First World War Hrushevsky was arrested by Russian authorities due to his Ukrainian activism and accused of "Mazepinism" and "Austrophilia". After two months of imprisonment in Kyiv, in 1915 he was exiled to Simbirsk, but later moved to Kazan and finally to Moscow. Despite constant police surveillance, the scientist continued his scholarly work and contributed to a number of Moscow-based Ukrainian publications.

=== Ukrainian Revolution ===
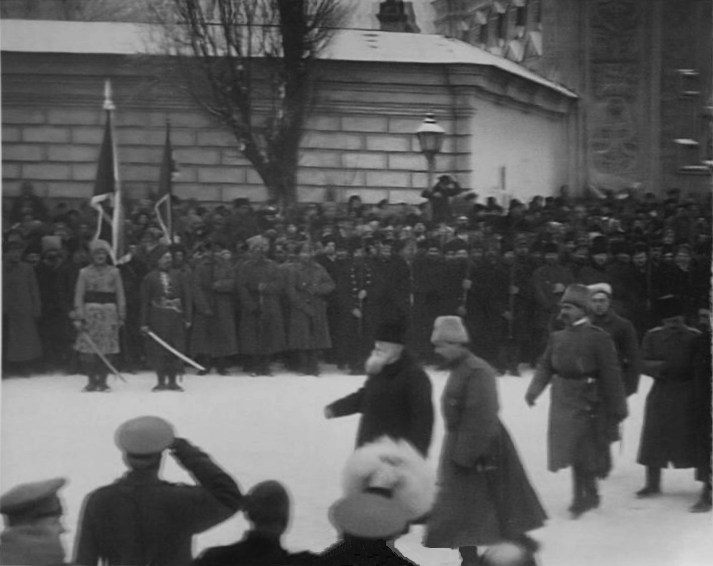
Hrushevsky as leader of the Central Rada at a military parade in Kyiv in 1917

Soon after the February Revolution, on 17 March 1917, Hrushevsky, still living in Moscow, was elected head of the revolutionary parliament, the Ukrainian Central Rada in Kyiv. After returning to Ukraine, he gradually guided it from national autonomy within a democratic Russia through to complete independence. During that time he also chaired the Congress of the Peoples of Russia. As a politician, Hrushevsky supported radical democratic and socialist positions. On February 17, 1918, The New York Times published an article by Hrushevsky that outlined Ukraine's struggle for self-government. His government developed a project of the Constitution of the Ukrainian People's Republic, which was adopted on 29 April 1918.

Following the German-supported coup of General Pavlo Skoropadskyi, he went into hiding. Hrushevsky felt that Skoropadsky had perverted the cause of Ukrainian statehood by associating it with social conservatism. Due to his opposition to the hetman's regime, he refused to join the newly founded Ukrainian Academy of Sciences. Hrushevsky returned to public politics after the overthrow of Skoropadsky by the Directory. He did not, however, approve of the Directory and soon found himself in conflict with it. In 1919, he emigrated to Vienna, Austria, having acquired a mandate from the Ukrainian Party of Socialist Revolutionaries to co-ordinate the activities of its representatives abroad.

=== Emigration and return to Ukraine ===
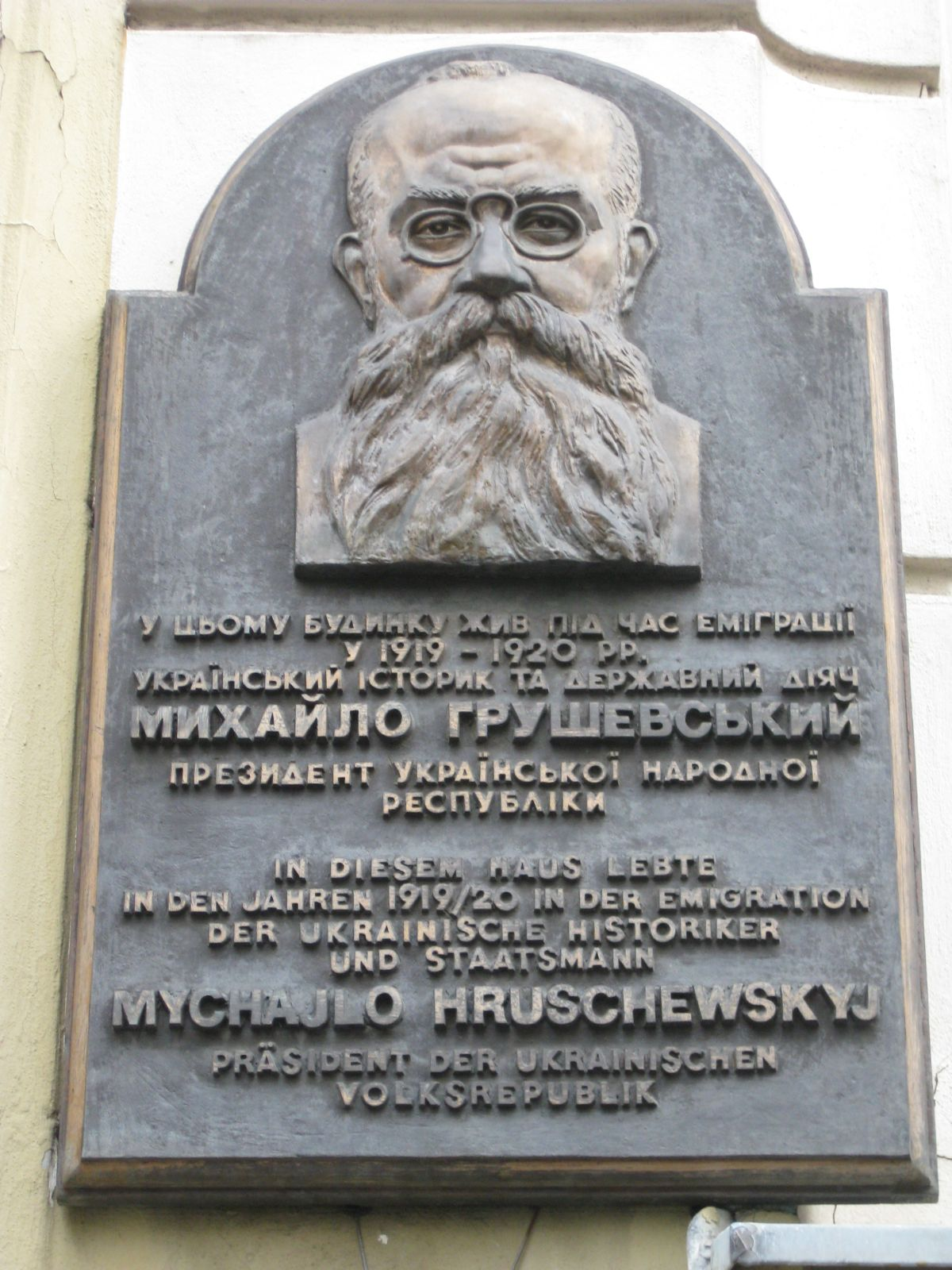
Plaque in Vienna marking the home in which Hrushevsky lived during his exile.

While an émigré, Hrushevsky expressed support for Bolshevik-led Ukrainization, and his wish to continue scientific work in his native country led to his recognition of the Soviet regime. Along with other members of the Ukrainian Party of Socialist Revolutionaries, he formed the Foreign Delegation of the Ukrainian Party of Socialist Revolutionaries, which advocated reconciliation with the Bolshevik government. Though the group was critical of the Bolsheviks, especially because of their centralism and repressive activities in Ukraine, it felt that the criticisms had to be put aside because the Bolsheviks were the leaders of the international revolution. Hrushevsky and his group petitioned the Ukrainian SSR government to legalise the Ukrainian Party of Socialist Revolutionaries and to allow the members of the Foreign Delegation to return. The Ukrainian SSR government was unwilling to do so. By 1921, the Foreign Delegation of the Ukrainian Party of Socialist Revolutionaries had ended its activity, but all of its members returned to Ukraine, including Hrushevsky, who did so in 1924.

=== Later life and death ===
Back in Ukraine, Hrushevsky was elected to the All-Ukrainian Academy of Sciences and concentrated on academic work. Above all, he continued writing his monumental History of Ukraine-Rusʹ. In 1929 the historian was elected member of the Academy of Sciences of the Soviet Union. Although political conditions prevented his return to public politics, he was caught up in the Stalinist purge of the Ukrainian intelligentsia. In 1931, after a long campaign against Hrushevsky in the Soviet press, he was exiled to Moscow, where his health deteriorated due to difficult conditions and persecution. Soon after arriving to Moscow, he was arrested due to accusation of being part of a "Ukrainian nationalist centre", but in January 1933 his case was closed, officially due to the scientist's death (possibly a mistake). In 1934, while vacationing at the Academy of Sciences resort in Kislovodsk in the Caucasus, Hrushevsky died of sepsis soon after a routine minor surgery at the age of 68. He was buried at the Baikove Cemetery in Kyiv.

At the time of his death, Hrushevsky was being shadowed by the Soviet GPU. Secret police reports (probably fabricated by the GPU in Ukraine) were sent to Moscow, claiming that had been considering defection to the West, and afterwards the government resolution and approval of his official obituary were published remarkably promptly, as if already prepared: the suspicious circumstances effectively made him a martyr for the Ukrainian cause.

Following his death, a significant portion of Hrushevsky's personal library and archive was transferred to the custody of the All-Ukrainian Academy of Sciences in Kyiv, though a subset remained with his family and was later acquired by the Ukrainian Catholic University in Lviv.

== Scientific career ==
Front page of the second volume of History of Ukraine-Rus', 1905

=== Historian ===
==== Major works ====
Hrushevsky wrote his first academic book, Bar Starostvo: Historical Notes: XV-XVIII, on the history of Bar, Ukraine. As a historian, he authored the first detailed scholarly synthesis of Ukrainian history, his ten-volume History of Ukraine-Rus, which was published in the Ukrainian language and covered the period from prehistory to the 1660s. In the work, he balanced a commitment to the ordinary Ukrainian people with an appreciation for native Ukrainian political entities, autonomous polities, which steadily increased in the final volumes of his master work. In general, his approach combined rationalist enlightenment principles with a romantic commitment to the cause of the nation and positivist methodology to produce a highly-authoritative history of his native land and people. Hrushevsky also wrote a multi-volume History of Ukrainian Literature, an Outline History of the Ukrainian People and a very popular Illustrated History of Ukraine, which appeared in both Ukrainian and Russian editions. In addition, he wrote numerous specialised studies in which he displayed a very acute critical acumen. His personal bibliography has over 2000 separate titles.

Hrushevsky’s History of Ukraine-Rus’ represented a seismic break from the Russocentric paradigm that had previously driven historiography. Russian imperial domination of political history had sought to entrench a narrative advocating a direct continuity between Rus' and the Suzdalia-Muscovy-Russian Empire — an interpretation of medieval history that, for decades, Western scholarship had fully embraced.

==== Criticism ====
In Hrushevsky's varied historical writings, certain basic ideas come to the fore. Firstly, he saw continuity in Ukrainian history from ancient times to his own. Thus, he claimed the ancient Ukrainian steppe cultures from Scythia to Kievan Rus' to the Cossacks as part of Ukrainian heritage. He viewed the Principality of Galicia–Volhynia as the sole legitimate heir of Kievan Rus, which opposed the official scheme of Russian history, which claimed Kievan Rus' for the Vladimir-Suzdal Principality and Imperial Russia. Secondly, to give real depth to the continuity, Hrushevsky stressed the role of the common people, the "popular masses" as he called them, throughout the eras. Thus, popular revolts against the various foreign states that ruled Ukraine were also a major theme. Thirdly, Hrushevsky always emphasised native Ukrainian factors rather than international ones as the causes of various phenomena. Thus, he was an anti-Normanist, who stressed the Slavic origins of Rus, internal discord as the primary reason for the fall of Kievan Rus' and the native Ukrainian ethnic makeup and origins of the Ukrainian Cossacks. (He considered runaway serfs especially important in the last regard.) Also, he stressed the national aspect to the Ukrainian Renaissance of the 16th and 17th centuries and considered that the great revolt of Bohdan Khmelnytsky and the Cossacks against the Polish–Lithuanian Commonwealth to be largely a national and social phenomenon, rather than simply a religious phenomenon. Thus, continuity nativism and populism characterised his general histories.

On the role of statehood in Hrushevsky's historical thought, contemporary scholars still do not agree. Some believe that Hrushevsky retained a populist mistrust of the state throughout his career and that it was reflected by his deep democratic convictions, but others believe that Hrushevsky gradually became more and more for Ukrainian statehood in his various writings and that to be is reflected in his political work on the construction of a Ukrainian national state, during the revolution in 1917 and 1918. Among Hrushevsky's prominent critics was Harvard University professor of Ukrainian studies Omeljan Pritsak. According to Pritsak, Hrushevsky's neglection of the role of political elite in Ukrainian history led to disruption of the nation's historical narrative.

=== Other scholarly activities ===
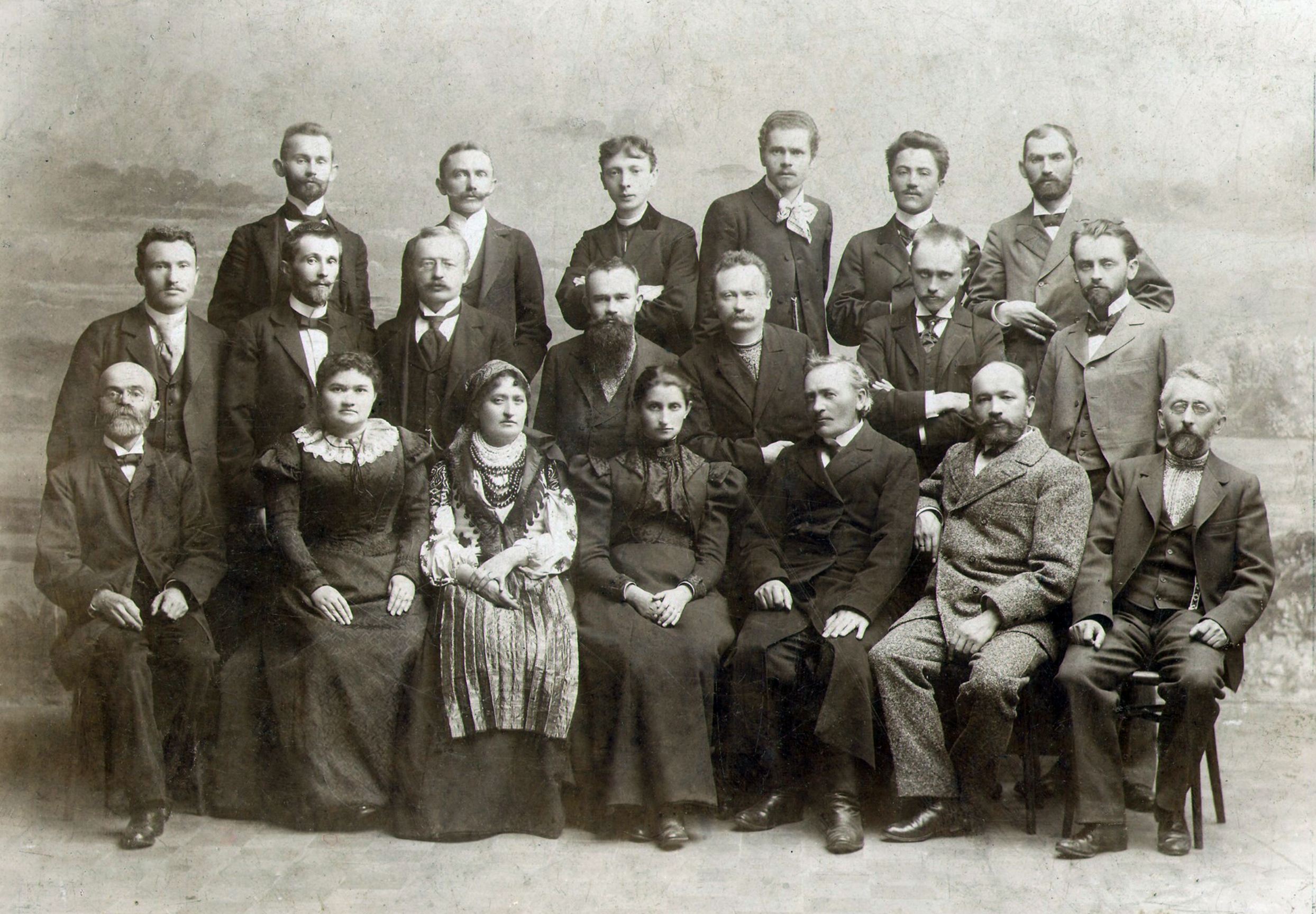
The board and members of the Shevchenko Scientific Society celebrating the 100th anniversary of the publication of Ivan Kotliarevsky's Eneida, Lviv, 31 October 1898

As an organiser of scholarship, Hrushevsky oversaw the transformation of the Shevchenko Literary Society, based in the province of Halychyna (Galicia), Austria-Hungary, into a new Shevchenko Scientific Society, which published hundreds of volumes of scholarly literature before the First World War and quickly grew to serve as an unofficial academy of sciences for Ukrainian on both sides of the border with Russia. After the Russian Revolution of 1905, Hrushevsky organised the Ukrainian Scientific Society in Kyiv in 1907 that served as a prototype to the future Academy of Sciences. After the 1917-1921 revolution, he founded the Ukrainian Sociological Institute in exile in Vienna. After his return to Ukraine in the 1920s, he became a major figure of the All-Ukrainian Academy of Sciences in Kyiv in 1923.

== Legacy ==
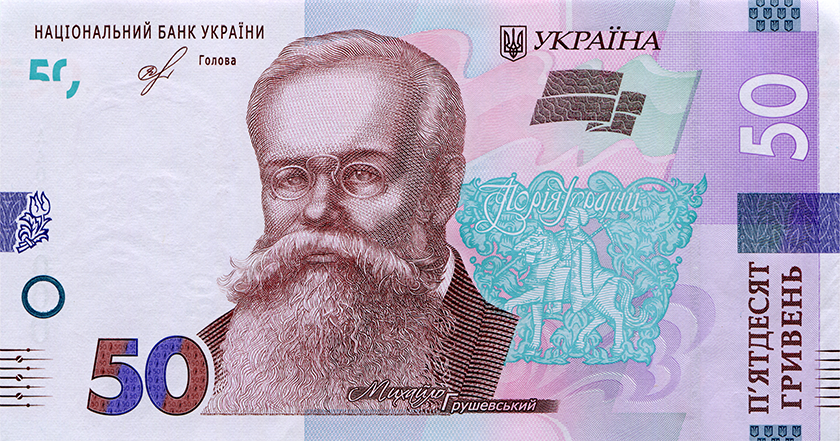
Hrushevskyi portrait on ₴ 50 bill, 2019

Hrushevsky is regarded among Ukraine's most prominent 20th-century scholars and statesmen. He has enjoyed wider public appreciation than national figures Volodymyr Vynnychenko, who is linked with left-wing politics, and Symon Petliura, who is associated with violence.

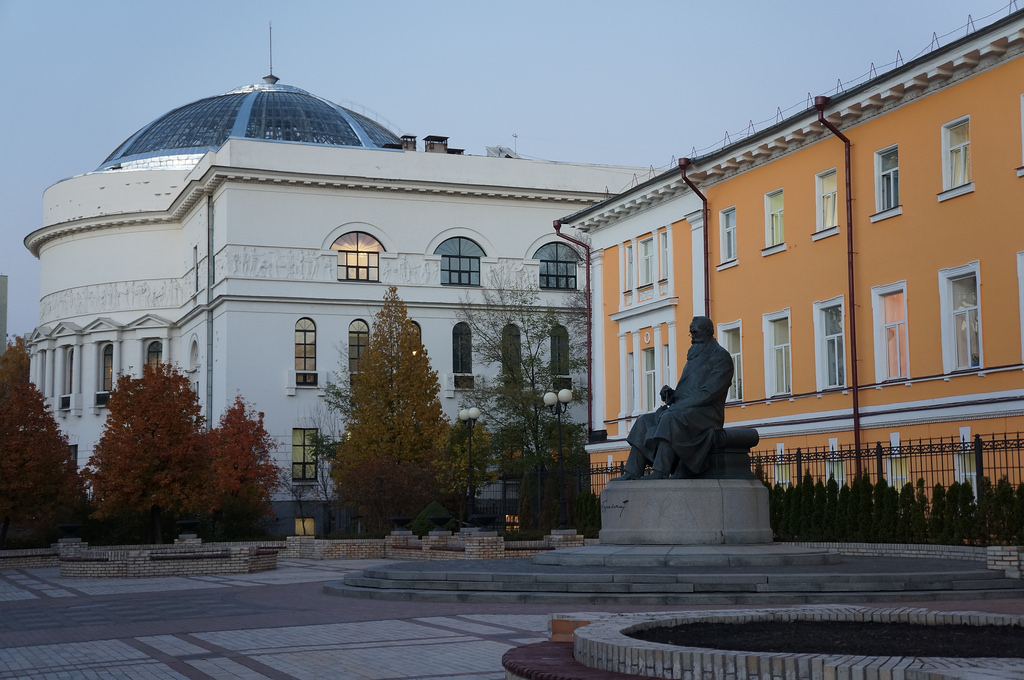
Mykhailo Hrushevsky monument in Kyiv

Hrushevsky's portrait appears on the 50 hryvnia note. A museum in Kyiv and another in Lviv are devoted to his memory, and monuments to him have been erected in both cities. A street in Kyiv bears his name and houses the Verkhovna Rada (parliament) and many governmental offices. The Ukrainian Academy of Sciences recently initiated the publication of his Collected Works, in 50 volumes.

The chair of Ukrainian history at Harvard University is named for him.

== Family ==
Mykhailo Hrushevsky had five younger siblings: sister Hanna and brothers Zakhariy, Fedir, Oleksandr and Vasyl. Oleksandr (1877–1943) was married to Olha Hrushevska (Parfenenko) (1876–1961). Hanna Shamraieva had two children, Serhii and Olha.

Hrushevskyi's wife, Maria-Ivanna Hrushevska (November 8, 1868 – September 19, 1948), was from 1917 was a member of the Central Rada and a treasurer for the Ukrainian National Theatre. Their daughter Kateryna Hrushevska was born in 1900. In July 1938 she was arrested on accusation of "anti-Soviet activities" and held in Kyiv's Lukyanivka Prison. According to official documents, she died in 1943 in exile in Novosibirsk. Maria herself died in 1948 in Kyiv, having never learnt about her daughter's death.

== Bibliography ==
- Hrushevsky, M., Bar Starostvo: Historical Notes: XV-XVIII, St. Volodymyr University Publishing House, Velyka-Vasyl'kivska, Building no. 29-31, Kyiv, Ukraine, 1894; Lviv, Ukraine, ISBN 978-5-12-004335-9, pp. 1 – 623, 1996.
