= Central State Electronic Archives of Ukraine =

Ukrainian national archive organisation

The Central State Electronic Archives of Ukraine provides receiving, record keeping and centralized government storage of electronic records of the National Archival Fund, information resources, and creates conditions for their use.

== History ==
According to the Cabinet of Ministers of Ukraine of May 12, 2007, No. 279-r formed Central State Electronic Archives of Ukraine.

== Principal activities ==
- participate in the implementation of the state policy in the field of archives and records management, coordination of state authorities, local authorities, enterprises, institutions and organizations regardless of ownership on implementation of electronic document management, electronic document storage and use of information;
- receiving relevant documents, record keeping and permanent storage of these documents, and the use of information contained in them;
- examination of the documents in order to introduce them to the NAF or withdrawn from it;
- provide consultations on its activity state archives, public authorities, local governments, enterprises, institutions and organizations regardless of ownership;
- conducting research and methodological work on creating, recording, storage, archival electronic records and electronic information resources, introduction of electronic document management, digital signatures, information and communication technologies.

== Structure ==
- Department of the formation of the National Archives and Records Management Fund
- Department of Information Technology
- Department of preservation and recording
- Financial and Economic Department
- Sector of use documents
- Sector personnel and regime-secret work

== Leaders ==
- 2007-2011 Anatoliy Lavrenyuk
- 2011-2015 Olena Us
- From 2015 Yuriy Kovtaniuk

== CSEA store the following electronic documents ==
- electronic records of institutions and agencies transferred by state archives;
- electronic information resources;
- electronic records and information resources of natural persons transferred either by state archives or their owners;
- electronic records of legal entities and natural persons received from abroad;
- filing documents and archive information books of the Archives (descriptions, catalogues, field guides etc.).

== Funds ==
Fund number 1 - The Archival electronic collection "Presidential Election 2010". Volume of fund - 27 units.

Fund number 2 - Archival Collection "Local elections in Ukraine 2010". Volume of fund - 17 units.

Fund number 3 - Archival Collection "Web archive 2003-2010 Ukrainian National Information Agency" Ukrinform ". Volume of fund - 16 units.

Fund number 4 - Archival Collection of websites "The Chernobyl disaster - 25 years later." Volume of fund - 10 units.

Fund number 5 - Archival Collection of website "Euro 2012". Volume of fund - 9 units.

Fund number 6 - Archival Collection "Parliamentary Elections - 2012". Volume of fund - 13 units.

Fund number 7 - Electronic information resources of the State Committee of Ukraine on Nationalities and Religions. Volume of fund - 1 unit.

Fund number 8 - Archival Collection "UNESCO World Heritage in Ukraine".

Fund number 9 - Petuschak Valeriy Disanovych (year of birth 1939) - Ukrainian traveler, scientist, and writer. Volume of fund - 12 units.

Fund number 10 - "The word about Kobzar (to the 200th anniversary of the birth of Taras Shevchenko)». Volume of fund - 7 units.

Fund number 15 - "Trymbach Sergey Vasilyevich (born 1950) - Ukrainian film expert, film historian, Honored Artist of Ukraine, laureate of the State Prize of Ukraine named after Olexander Dovzhenko". Volume of fund - 26 units.

== Articles and books ==
- Yurii Kovtanyuk XIII International Conference "Electronic documentation and presentation of archival material on the Internet" from the series Colloquia Jerzy Skowronek dedicata.// Archives of Ukraine. 2013. – Number 3 (285). – p. 223-234.
- On peculiarities of work with electronic documents in Ukraine. Interview with the Director of the Central State Electronic Archives of Ukraine Olena Us// Secretary. – 2013. – No. 1. – p. 24-29.
- Articles archive
