= Ukrainian Constituent Assembly =

Proposed constituent assembly of the Ukrainian People's Republic

Ukrainian Constituent Assembly Українські Установчі Збори
- Ukrainian People's Republic

Type
- Type: Unicameral

History
- Established: November 29, 1917
- Preceded by: Central Council of Ukraine (succession never realized)
- Seats: 301

Elections
- Last election: January 9, 1918

The Ukrainian Constituent Assembly (Ukrainian: Українські Установчі Збори, romanized: Ukrainski Ustanovchi Zbory) was a planned All-National Congress which was supposed to confirm the Constitution of the Ukrainian People's Republic and establish a new political system. The Assembly was supposed to be the supreme state power and elections to which were to be organized by the Central Council (also known as the Central Rada), which would hold its sessions between the meetings of the Assembly. The Assembly was suspended because of the Bolshevik aggression in the Ukrainian–Soviet War (part of the Russian Civil War) of December 25, 1917 that led to a proclamation of Ukrainian independence by the IV Universal.

== Preceding events ==
=== First proposals ===
The idea for an All-National Congress surfaced after the February Revolution, but was strongly opposed by the Russian Provisional Government which interpreted it as separatism on the part of the Central Council. In its very first Universal the Central Council declared that only the All-National Congress has "the right to approve all laws" in Ukraine. At its sixth session (August 18–22, 1917) the Central Council recognized the importance of the organization of such an institution and held a forum for an electoral system and the convening of the assembly.

=== Reactions ===
After the sixth session of the Central Council the most influential party in the Russian Empire, the Kadets, resigned from the Ukrainian council in protest at the arranging of the All-National Congress. By the end of September several other parties of national minorities such as the Mensheviks of the RSDRP, the Socialist-Revolutionary Party, and the Bund protested against a Ukrainian Constituent Assembly. The Minor Rada (the executive committee of the Central Council) tried to find a compromise due to those protests and declared that the National Assembly would be confirmed by the All-Russian Constituent Assembly. The compromise resulted in some reconciliation among the members of the Central Council which elected a commission to design the laws that would govern the Constituent Assembly. Nonetheless, on 30 October 1917 the Russian Provisional Government accused the Ukrainian government of separatism, suspended funding of the General Secretariat, and declared its intention to turn to the courts. A special delegation to Petrograd was organized to negotiate the issue, however its mission was suspended and later canceled due to the Bolshevik coup-d'état in the capital.

=== Adoption of legal base ===
On October 12, 1917, the Central Rada passed the fundamental laws on elections to the assembly. It also instructed the Minor Rada to confirm the laws and organize the elections. The III Universal of the Central Rada (November 20, 1917) designated January 9 as election day while the first convention of the assembly was scheduled to take place on January 22. The Universal also decreed that until the assembly convened the legislative power of the Ukrainian autonomy remained the Central Rada. The law on the Constituent Assembly was ratified on November 29, 1917. There were expected to be 301 deputies which was around 1 per 100,000 constituents. The appointed head of the electoral commission was M.Moroz.

== Election and aftermath ==
Due to the Bolshevik offensive against Ukraine, only 171 out of 301 members of the assembly could be elected in the 9th January election in the districts not occupied by enemy troops. As a result, the assembly was never convened.

== See also ==
- Verkhovna Rada
- Central Rada
- 1918 Ukrainian Constituent Assembly election
- Kiev Arsenal January Uprising and Ukrainian–Soviet War

== Bibliography ==
- Khrystiuk, Pavlo (1921). "Записки і матеріали до історії української революції 1917—1920 pp." (Notes and materials to the history of the Ukrainian Revolution 1917–20). Vol I-II. Vienna.
- Doroshenko Dmytro (1932). "Історія України 1917—1923" (History of Ukraine 1917–23). Vol I "Доба Центральної Ради" (The times of the Central Rada). Uzhhorod 1932, New-York 1954.
- Reshetar, J. (1952). "The Ukrainian Revolution 1917—1920". Princeton 1952.
- Encyclopedia of Ukraine
