= Constitution of the Ukrainian People's Republic =

Constitution approved 1918

Constitution of Ukrainian People's Republic
- The constitution's draft of the front page.
- Created: Started 1917
- Ratified: April 29, 1918
- Location: National Archive Fond of Ukraine
- Author: Central Council of Ukraine deputies

The Constitution of the Ukrainian People's Republic (Ukrainian: Конституція Української Народної Республіки, romanized: Konstytutsiia Ukrainskoi Narodnoi Respubliky) is a constitutional document approved by the Central Council of Ukraine on April 29, 1918, but never promulgated. Hence the document never acquired the legal power. Nevertheless, it remains an important document from the period of the Ukrainian People's Republic.

The Constitution's main principle was separation of powers. This is not surprising given that it was modeled after democratic constitutions of Europe and the United States.

The constitution was composed of 83 articles, which were divided into 8 sections:

== Contents ==
=== Section I. General Principles ===
The section consists of six articles and simply declares that every citizen on UPR is equal in his or her rights and that the government of UPR is the only government of the republic. The regional administration is given a right of self-government, while sustaining the principle of decentralization.

=== Section II. Rights of the Citizens of Ukraine ===
The section contains 15 articles. Here are some of the examples.
8. The citizen of UPR cannot be simultaneously the citizen of another state.
11. The lawful, civil, and political powers of the citizen of UPR starts from 20 years of age. Any difference in rights and duties between men and women the Law of UPR does not know.
13. No citizen of UPR nor anybody else can be arrested on the territory without the court order unless during the hot act. Although even in such a case he must be released no later than 24 hours if the court will not identify any case of the arrest.
15. House property is recognized as the untouchable. Any kind of search cannot take place without the court order. If in special cases the law enforcement agencies violate the right, the court order at the request of a citizen will be presented during the next 48 hours upon the completion of the search.

=== Section III. Authorities of the Ukrainian People's Republic ===
This section consisted of five articles.
23. The supreme government of UPR are the All-Peoples Congress that without intermediateries act as the supreme legislative power in UPR and form the powers of the Executive and the Judicial government of UPR.
24. The supreme Executive power in UPR belongs to the Council of the People's Ministers.
25. The supreme Judicial power is the General Court of UPR.
26. All kinds of local affairs are conducted by the elected Council and the community Administration of volosts and lands. All of the local governing belongs directly and with no intermediaries to them. The ministers only supervise and coordinate their actions (#50) with no intermediaries and through the appointed by them officials not intruding into the affairs of those Councils and Administrations and all the arguments in that regard are decided through the Court of the Ukrainian People's Republic (##60-68).

=== Section IV. All-People's Congress of the Ukrainian People's Republic ===
All-People's Congress was declared to be the supreme organ of power in the Ukrainian People's Republic. Representing the Ukrainian people on the basis of democratic election, the Congress issued laws and formed the chief institutions of government, as well as courts. Head of the Congress represented Ukraine in foreign politics.

=== Section V. On the Council of the People's Ministers of the Ukrainian People's Republic ===
The government (Council of People's Ministers) was appointed by the Congress and responsible before it; the Council could issue a non-confidence motion to the whole government or its separate ministers.

=== Section VI. Courts of the Ukrainian People's Republic ===
The Congress also elected the judicial college of the General Court of the Ukrainian People's Republic for a 5-year term. Constitutional changes had to be adopted with a majority of three-fifths, and confirmed by new deputies of the Congress after new elections.

=== Section VII. National unions ===
Contained a law on national-personal autonomy of minorities in Ukraine. According to the law, all ethnicities residing in the territory of Ukraine received a right on self-government through their own national unions ruled by elected autonomous organs financed both from the state budget and from taxation of their members. Russians, Jews and Poles received autonomy immediately, meanwhile representatives of other nations could attain the same rights by presenting 10,000 signatures from their members to authorities.

=== Section VIII. On the temporary termination of citizen's rights ===
The section included rulings on temporary termination of citizens' rights in case of finality.

== Summary ==
The Constitution defined the Ukrainian People's Republic as a parliamentary democracy with the legislature dominating over the executive. It promoted decentralization and local self-government and established a liberal policy towards national minorities.

== Legacy ==
Despite being adopted by the higher authority of the Ukrainian People's Republic, the Constitution was never implemented due to the Hetman's coup and was abolished by a decree of Pavlo Skoropadsky on the day of its ratification. Separate elements of the document influenced the law of the Ukrainian People's Republic under the Directorate.

== See also ==
- Constitution of Pylyp Orlyk (1710)
- Constitution of Ukraine (1996)
