= Mykhailo Potebenko =

Prosecutor General of Ukraine (1998–2002)

- Михайло Потебенько
- Potebenko in 1990

Prosecutor General of Ukraine
- In office 16 July 1998 – 30 April 2002
- Preceded by: Hennadiy Ferents (acting)
- Succeeded by: Sviatoslav Piskun

People's Deputy of Ukraine
- In office 14 May 2002 – 25 May 2006
- Constituency: Communist Party of Ukraine (No.20)

People's Deputy of Ukraine
- In office 15 May 1990 – 10 May 1994
- Constituency: Electoral district No.291 (Novyi Buh)

Prosecutor of the Ukrainian SSR
- In office February 1990 – 4 September 1991
- Preceded by: Petro Osypenko

Personal details
- Born: 16 February 1937 (age 89) Holinka, Bakhmach Raion, Chernihiv Oblast, Ukrainian SSR, Soviet Union (now Ukraine)
- Party: Lytvyn Bloc
- Other political affiliations: Communist Party of Ukraine; CP(b)U
- Education: Lviv University
- Awards: Order of Yaroslav the Wise, 5th, 4th, 3rd class Order of Merit (Ukraine)

Mykhailo Oleksiyovych Potebenko (Ukrainian: Михайло Олексійович Потебенько, Ukrainian pronunciation: [mɪˈxai̯ɫo oɫekˈsʲijowɪt͡ʃ poteˈbɛnʲko]; born 16 February 1937) is a Ukrainian lawyer and former politician, who served as the Prosecutor General of Ukraine in 1998–2002. Potebenko played a prominent role in several political scandals which took place in Ukraine under the presidency of Leonid Kuchma, including the criminal cases of Pavlo Lazarenko and Yulia Tymoshenko, and supervised investigation into the murder of Georgiy Gongadze.

== Biography ==
=== Early career ===
Mykhailo Potebenko was born on 16 February 1937 in the village of Holinka, Bakhmach Raion, Chernihiv Oblast to a family of Ukrainian peasants. In 1955 he enrolled into the Lviv State University, graduating with a degree in law. Starting from 1960, Potebenko worked as an investigator at the prosecutor's office in Troitske, Kherson Oblast, and in 1963 took the position of senior investigator of the district prosecution in Henichesk. In 1967 he was appointed to serve as deputy head of the investigatory department of Kherson Oblast prosecutor's office, and in 1969 became an instructor of the administrative department at the Communist Party regional committee.

In 1978 Potebenko was appointed prosecutor of Kherson Oblast, and starting from 1983 served as deputy, first deputy, and Prosecutor of the Ukrainian SSR. In 1986 Potebenko was appointed to investigate the causes of Chernobyl disaster, and in the aftermath received the status of liquidator.

As a member of the Communist Party, Potebenko was elected to the Kherson Oblast Council before campaigning for a seat in the Supreme Council of Ukrainian SSR. During the 1990 Ukrainian Supreme Soviet election, he was nominated as a candidate by workers of the Bohdan Khmelnytsky state farm in Bereznehuvate Raion. After two rounds of voting, Potebenko defeated the other two competitors in his electoral district and was elected to the republican parliament.

In 1991 Potebenko was appointed to head the human resources department of the Prosecutor's Office of Ukraine. During the same year, Potebenko became deputy prosecutor of Kherson Oblast. In 1994 he lost his place in the Verkhovna Rada following a new election. During the same year, took the position of deputy transport prosecutor of Central Ukraine, and in 1996 was appointed prosecutor of Kyiv Oblast.

=== Prosecutor General ===
On 16 July 1998 president Leonid Kuchma appointed Potebenko to the post of Prosecutor General of Ukraine with the approval of Verkhovna Rada. On that position, Potebenko was implicated in the Cassette Scandal. In particular, his voice appeared on recordings supposedly proving the prosecution's involvement into the imprisonment of a lawyer in Donetsk, which was later deemed unjust by the European Court of Human Rights. In 2000 Potebenko initiated proceedings against former prime minister Pavlo Lazarenko, accusing him of involvement into the murder of people's deputy Yevhen Shcherban in 1996; Lazarenko himself declared the accusations to be a libel. As prosecutor general, Potebenko made several visits to the United States, demanding to extradite Lazarenko to Ukraine, but failed with his mission.

According to Mykola Melnychenko, following the 1999 Ukrainian presidential election, Potebenko had been instructed by Kuchma to initiate a criminal case against Yulia Tymoshenko. In 2000 Potebenko was tasked with supervising the investigation into the murder of journalist Georgiy Gongadze, but achieved no conclusive result. According to jurist Valentyna Telychenko, who represented Myroslava Gongadze following the murder of her husband, Potebenko used his position in order to hinder the investigation of Gongadze's death. On 30 April 2002 president Leonid Kuchma removed Potebenko from the position of prosecutor general due to his election as people's deputy.

== Later career ==
Potebenko as people's deputy in 2002

During the 2002 Ukrainian parliamentary election, Potebenko ran as a candidate from the Communist Party of Ukraine. Following his election, he joined the fraction of Lytvyn Bloc in the Verkhovna Rada. On his post as people's deputy, he served as member of the committee on the issues of legal support of law enforcement, and took part in several temporary commissions.

As of 2011, Potebenko worked as an advisor of the Prosecutor General's Office.

== Family ==
Potebenko's son Yuriy Dyomin worked as head of the human resources department of the Prosecutor General's Office of Ukraine.

== Awards and honours ==
Potebenko is a cavalier of the Order of Prince Yaroslav the Wise and the Order of Merit, and holds the honorary title of Honoured Lawyer of Ukraine.
