= Ministry of Justice (Ukraine) =

Government ministry of Ukraine

Ministry of Justice of Ukraine
- Міністерство юстиції України; Мінюст України; Minjust of Ukraine

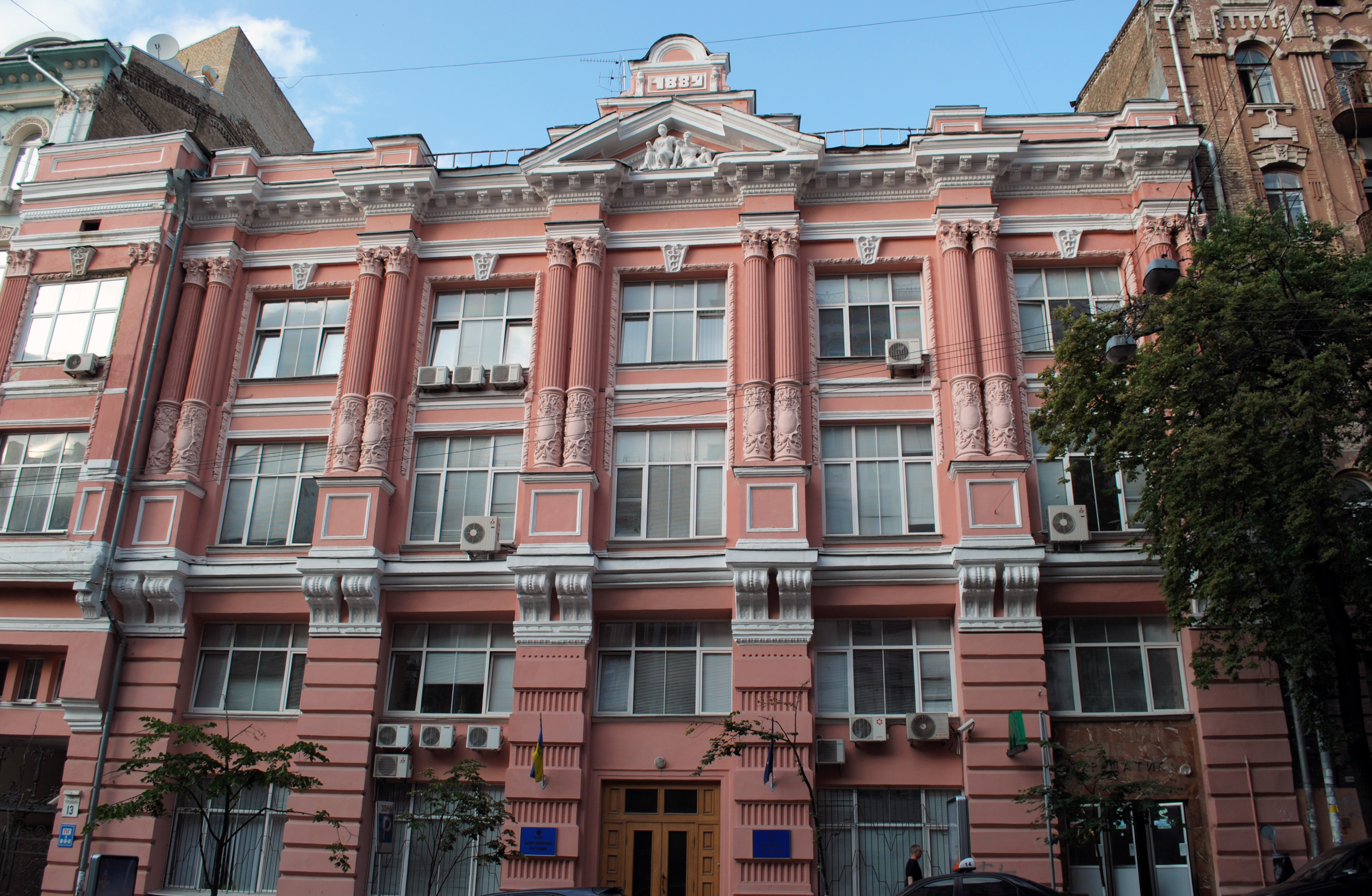
- Ministry headquarters in Kyiv

Agency overview
- Formed: 1990
- Preceding agencies: Ministry of Justice of the Ukrainian SSR (1947–1963); Commission of the Council of Ministers (1963–1970); Ministry of Justice of the Ukrainian SSR (1970–1990);
- Jurisdiction: Government of Ukraine
- Headquarters: 13, Horodetskoho st, Kyiv
- Minister responsible: Denys Maslov
- Child agencies: State Archive Service; State Executive Service; State Penitentiary Service; State Registration Service; State Service of Ukraine for protection of personal data
- Website: minjust.gov.ua/en

The Ministry of Justice of Ukraine (Ukrainian: Міністерство юстиції України, romanized: Ministerstvo yustytsiyi Ukrayiny), abbr. Мінюст [України], Minjust [of Ukraine], is the main body in the system of central government of Ukraine that regulates state legal policy. It is one of the oldest ministerial offices of the country tracing its history back to the beginning of 20th century.

== Main objectives ==
- Ensuring realization of the state legal policy and the policy in the sphere of adaptation of the legislation of Ukraine to the legislation of the European Union.
- Preparation of propositions in conducting legal reforms and promoting development of a legal science.
- Ensuring the protection of rights and freedoms of a human and a citizen in the specific field.
- Preparation of propositions in improvement of legislation, its systematization, development of projects of legal acts and international agreements of Ukraine in legal affairs, conducting a legal expertise of projects of legal acts, state registration of legal acts, maintaining the Unified state registry of such acts.
- Planning by the proposals of other central bodies of executive power of legislative proceedings and actions in adaptation of the legislation of Ukraine to the legislation of the European Union.
- Coordination of actions in implementation of the National program in adaptation of the legislation of Ukraine to the legislation of the European Union.
- Organization of implementing the decisions of judges and other authorities (officials) according to the laws, working with human resources, expert support of justice.
- Organization of notary performance and the authorities in registration of acts of civil status.
- Developing a legal informativeness and forming in citizens a legal outlook.
- Fulfilling an international legal cooperation.

== Structure ==
The ministry consists of the central body of ministry headed by its leadership composed of a minister, his/hers first deputy, and other deputies in assistance to the minister. To the central body of ministry also belongs the government official in affairs of the European Court of Human Rights, who represents Ukraine in the mentioned international institution. The ministry regulates and controls activities of notaries (legal law representatives and executives) in Ukraine.

There are several state departments and agencies that are assigned to the leadership of the ministry, each deputy of which is also assigned a territorial representation of local authorities of justice.

- State Archive Service of Ukraine
- State Executive Service of Ukraine
- State Penitentiary Service of Ukraine
  - The agency, headquartered in Kyiv, operates the country's prisons.
- State Registration Service of Ukraine
- State Service of Ukraine for protection of personal data

== List of ministers of justice ==
| Name of parent agency | Chairman of government | Name of minister | Term of office | |
| Name of parent agency | Chairman of government | Name of minister | Start | End |
|---|---|---|---|---|
| General Secretariat of Ukraine | Volodymyr Vynnychenko | Valentyn Sadovsky | 28 June 1917 | 13 August 1917 |
| General Secretariat of Ukraine | Volodymyr Vynnychenko | Mykhailo Tkachenko | 12 November 1917 | 23 January 1918 |
| Council of People's Ministers | Volodymyr Vynnychenko | Mykhailo Tkachenko | 23 January 1918 | February 1918 |
| Council of People's Ministers | Vsevolod Holubovych | Serhiy Shelukhin | February 1918 | 29 April 1918 |
| Council of Ministers (1918) | Fedir Lyzohub | Mikhail Chubinsky | 30 April 1918 | 24 August 1918 |
| Council of Ministers (1918) | Fedir Lyzohub | Aleksei Romanov | August 1918 | 25 October 1918 |
| Council of Ministers (1918) | Fedir Lyzohub | Andrei Vyazlov | 25 October 1918 | 14 November 1918 |
| Council of Ministers (1918) | Sergei Gerbel | Viktor Reinbot | 14 November 1918 | 14 December 1918 |
| Council of People's Ministers | Volodymyr Chekhivsky | Serhiy Shelukhin (acting) | | |
| Council of People's Ministers | Volodymyr Chekhivsky | Viktor Prykhodko | | |
| Council of People's Ministers | Volodymyr Chekhivsky | Hryhoriy Syrotenko | | 13 February 1919 |
| Council of People's Ministers | Serhiy Ostapenko | Dmytro Markovych | 13 February 1919 | 9 April 1919 |
| Council of People's Ministers | Borys Martos | Andriy Livytskyi | 9 April 1919 | 5 August 1921 |
| Council of People's Ministers | Isaak Mazepa | Andriy Livytskyi | 9 April 1919 | 5 August 1921 |
| Council of People's Ministers | Vyacheslav Prokopovych | Andriy Livytskyi | 9 April 1919 | 5 August 1921 |
| Council of People's Ministers | Andriy Livytskyi | Andriy Livytskyi | 9 April 1919 | 5 August 1921 |
| Council of People's Ministers | Vyacheslav Prokopovych | Andriy Livytskyi | 9 April 1919 | 5 August 1921 |
| Temporary Peasant-Worker's Government | Georgy Pyatakov | Aleksandr Khmelnitskiy | 28 November 1918 | May 1919 |
| All-Ukrainian Revolutionary Committee | Christian Rakovsky | Mikhail Lebedinets | May 1919 | August 1919 |
| People's Commissariat of UkrSSR | Christian Rakovsky | Yevhen Terletskyi | 20 February 1920 | 3 March 1921 |
| People's Commissariat of UkrSSR | Christian Rakovsky | Sergei Buzdalin | 1921 | 1921 |
| People's Commissariat of UkrSSR | Christian Rakovsky | Mikhail Vetoshkin | January 1922 | 1922 |
| People's Commissariat of UkrSSR | Christian Rakovsky | Mykola Skrypnyk | 1922 | 1923 |
| People's Commissariat of UkrSSR | Vlas Chubar | Mykola Skrypnyk | 1923 | 1927 |
| People's Commissariat of UkrSSR | Vlas Chubar | Vasyl Poraiko | 5 March 1927 | 10 July 1930 |
| People's Commissariat of UkrSSR | Vlas Chubar | Vasyl Polyakov | September 1930 | 1933 |
| People's Commissariat of UkrSSR | Vlas Chubar | Mykhailo Mykhailyk | July 1933 | January 1935 |
| People's Commissariat of UkrSSR | Panas Lyubchenko | Arkadiy Kiselyov-Kesler | January 1935 | August 1936 |
| People's Commissariat of UkrSSR | Panas Lyubchenko | Khoma Radchenko | September 1936 | 1937 |
| People's Commissariat of UkrSSR | Mykhailo Bondarenko | Khoma Radchenko | 1937 | 1937 |
| People's Commissariat of UkrSSR | Demian Korotchenko | Mykola Babchenko | June 1938 | 1939 |
| People's Commissariat of UkrSSR | Leonid Korniyets | Mykola Babchenko | 1939 | 1944 |
| People's Commissariat of UkrSSR | Nikita Khrushchev | Mykola Babchenko | 1944 | 1946 |
| Cabinet of Ministers of UkrSSR | Nikita Khrushchev | Mykola Babchenko | 1946 | March 1947 |
| Cabinet of Ministers of UkrSSR | Demian Korotchenko | Denys Panasyuk | March 1947 | January 1953 |
| Cabinet of Ministers of UkrSSR | Demian Korotchenko | Fedir Hlukh | January 1953 | 1954 |
| Cabinet of Ministers of UkrSSR | Nykyfor Kalchenko | Fedir Hlukh | 1954 | March 1957 |
| Cabinet of Ministers of UkrSSR | Nykyfor Kalchenko | Kateryna Zghurska | March 1957 | 1961 |
| Cabinet of Ministers of UkrSSR | Volodymyr Shcherbytskyi | Kateryna Zghurska | 1961 | April 1963 |
| Cabinet of Ministers of UkrSSR | Volodymyr Shcherbytskyi | Volodymyr Zaichuk | 1970 | 1972 |
| Cabinet of Ministers of UkrSSR | Oleksandr Lyashko | Volodymyr Zaichuk | 1972 | 1987 |
| Cabinet of Ministers of UkrSSR | Vitaliy Masol | Volodymyr Zaichuk | 1987 | 1990 |
| Cabinet of Ministers of Ukraine | Vitold Fokin | Vitaliy Boiko | 2 August 1990 | 20 March 1992 |
| Cabinet of Ministers of Ukraine | Vitold Fokin | Volodymyr Kampo | 20 March 1992 | 21 April 1992 |
| Cabinet of Ministers of Ukraine | Leonid Kuchma | Vasyl Onopenko | 27 October 1992 | 16 June 1994 |
| Cabinet of Ministers of Ukraine | Vitaliy Masol | Vasyl Onopenko | 16 June 1994 | 7 August 1995 |
| Cabinet of Ministers of Ukraine | Yevhen Marchuk | Serhiy Holovatyi | 27 September 1995 | 28 May 1996 |
| Cabinet of Ministers of Ukraine | Pavlo Lazarenko | Serhiy Holovatyi | 28 May 1996 | 21 August 1997 |
| Cabinet of Ministers of Ukraine | Valeriy Pustovoitenko | Suzanna Stanik [1st female] | 21 August 1997 | 22 December 1999 |
| Cabinet of Ministers of Ukraine | Viktor Yushchenko | Suzanna Stanik [1st female] | 22 December 1999 | 29 May 2001 |
| Cabinet of Ministers of Ukraine | Anatoliy Kinakh | Suzanna Stanik [1st female] | 29 May 2001 | 7 May 2002 |
| Cabinet of Ministers of Ukraine | Anatoliy Kinakh | Oleksandr Lavrynovych | 7 May 2002 | 21 November 2002 |
| Cabinet of Ministers of Ukraine | Viktor Yanukovych | Oleksandr Lavrynovych | 21 November 2002 | 4 February 2005 |
| Cabinet of Ministers of Ukraine | Yulia Tymoshenko | Roman Zvarych | 4 February 2005 | 27 September 2005 |
| Cabinet of Ministers of Ukraine | Yuriy Yekhanurov | Serhiy Holovatyi | 27 September 2005 | 4 August 2006 |
| Cabinet of Ministers of Ukraine | Viktor Yanukovych | Roman Zvarych | 4 August 2006 | 1 November 2006 |
| Cabinet of Ministers of Ukraine | Viktor Yanukovych | Oleksandr Lavrynovych | 1 November 2006 | 18 December 2007 |
| Cabinet of Ministers of Ukraine | Yulia Tymoshenko | Mykola Onishchuk | 18 December 2007 | 11 March 2010 |
| Cabinet of Ministers of Ukraine | Mykola Azarov | Oleksandr Lavrynovych | 11 March 2010 | 2 July 2013 |
| Cabinet of Ministers of Ukraine | Mykola Azarov | Olena Lukash | 4 July 2013 | 27 February 2014 |
| Cabinet of Ministers of Ukraine | Arseniy Yatsenyuk | Pavlo Petrenko | 27 February 2014 | 14 April 2016 |
| Cabinet of Ministers of Ukraine | Volodymyr Groysman | Pavlo Petrenko | 14 April 2016 | 29 August 2019 |
| Cabinet of Ministers of Ukraine | Oleksiy Honcharuk | Denys Maliuska | 29 August 2019 | 4 September 2024 |
| Cabinet of Ministers of Ukraine | Denys Shmyhal | Olha Stefanishyna | 5 September 2024 | 17 July 2025 |
| Cabinet of Ministers of Ukraine | Yulia Svyrydenko | Herman Halushchenko | 17 July 2025 | 19 November 2025 |
| Cabinet of Ministers of Ukraine | Yulia Svyrydenko | Liudmyla Suhak (acting) | 19 November 2025 | 16 July 2026 |
| Cabinet of Ministers of Ukraine | Serhiy Koretskyi | Denys Maslov | 16 July 2026 | Incumbent |

=== Notes ===
- At the end of 1917 the Russian Social Democratic Labour Party established an oppositional government in Kharkiv, the People's Secretariat, a respective secretariat of which was headed by Vladimir Lyuksemburg. Some other secretaries of that government Yevgeniy Tereletsky and Mykola Skrypnyk later also have served as ministers of justice.
- On 28 November 1919, the newly established Communist Party (Bolsheviks) of Ukraine created a new government, the Temporary Workers-Peasants Government, again in the opposition to the acting government in Ukraine. On 29 January 1919, it was replaced with the People's Commissariat of the Ukrainian SSR.
- With securing of the Soviet power in Ukraine after 1920 and until 1936 the People's Commissar of Justice (Narkom) performed also the role of the Prosecutor General of the republic.
- Yevgeniy Tereletsky as the former People's Commissar of Justice in 1923 was an ambassador representing the Ukrainian SSR in the Baltic states.

== Regulation of public associations ==
The Ministry of Justice is responsible for the registration of public associations, including branches of international organisations and foreign non-profit NGOs. Territorial authorities accept applications for registration of public associations, change of data, liquidation of associations, etc. The Ministry provides public access to information on civic organisations established and operating in Ukraine through the relevant registers and databases.

=== Definition ===
The Law of Ukraine "On State Registration of Legal Entities, Individual Entrepreneurs and Public Organisations" defines a public association as a voluntary association of individuals and/or legal entities of private law for the purpose of exercising and protecting rights and freedoms, satisfying public, in particular economic, social, cultural, environmental and other interests. According to their legal form, public associations are divided into public organisations and public unions. The main difference is that public organisations can be founded by natural persons, while public unions can be founded by legal entities.

=== Regulation of the establishment and operation of public associations ===
Interference by state authorities and officials in the activities of public associations is unacceptable, except in cases provided for by law. The state ensures the observance of the rights and legitimate interests of public associations, supports their activities, and legislatively regulates the provision of tax and other benefits and advantages to them. Public associations have the right to form and operate freely, and they may freely cooperate with both Ukrainian and foreign NGOs, institutions, enterprises, etc.

In Ukraine, the establishment and operation of public associations aimed at eliminating Ukraine's independence, changing the constitutional order by force, violating the sovereignty and territorial integrity of the state, or undermining its security is prohibited. The law also prohibits encroachment on human rights and freedoms, public health and violation of equality on any grounds. In addition, the law prohibits the justification or denial of the armed aggression of the Russian Federation against Ukraine, any propaganda of totalitarian regimes and their symbols, including the Russian Nazi totalitarian regime and the symbols of the Russian military invasion.

=== Establishment of a public association ===
To establish a public association, at least two persons over the age of 18 are required. The establishment of a public association is carried out at a constituent assembly of its founders and is documented in a protocol. During the constituent assembly, the charter is drawn up, the name of the NGO is chosen, the purpose of the activity is formulated, and the management of the organisation is elected.

NGO must submit an application for registration to the territorial body of the Ministry of Justice of Ukraine within 60 days of the constituent assembly. The application must be accompanied by a package of documents, including the decision of the founders to establish a legal entity, a register of persons who participated in the constituent assembly, the constituent document of the legal entity and information on the governing bodies of the public formation. An applicant may submit an application in person or through a legal representative, by sending documents by mail. State registration usually takes three business days, after which the relevant entry on the establishment of a public association is made in the Unified State Register of Legal Entities, Individuals - Entrepreneurs and Public Formations.

=== Operations of the public association ===
==== Legal entity status ====
According to the Law of Ukraine "On Public Associations", a public association may carry out activities with or without the status of a legal entity. A public association with the status of a legal entity is a non-entrepreneurial company whose main purpose is not to make a profit.

==== Separate subdivision of a public association ====
A public association with the status of a legal entity may have separate subdivisions. The decision to establish such a unit is made by the governing body of the association. To register a separate subdivision, the relevant application together with the decision of the authorised governing body of the legal entity is submitted to the territorial body of the Ministry of Justice of Ukraine. A corresponding entry is made in the Unified State Register.

==== All-Ukrainian status of a public association ====
A public association may have all-Ukrainian status if it has separate subdivisions in most administrative-territorial units. In order to obtain the all-Ukrainian status, an application must be submitted to the territorial body of the Ministry of Justice of Ukraine. Both the registration of the all-Ukrainian status and its cancellation are voluntary.

=== Liquidation of an association ===
The decision to terminate a public association is made by the assembly and is subject to state registration. For this purpose, the relevant application shall be submitted to a territorial body of the Ministry of Justice of Ukraine. If there are no grounds for refusal, a corresponding entry is made in the Unified State Register.

=== Separate subdivision of a foreign NGO ===
Foreign non-governmental and charitable organisations may have a separate subdivision in Ukraine. In order to accredit a separate subdivision, an application and a package of documents shall be submitted to the Ministry of Justice of Ukraine. A separate subdivision of a foreign NGO is accredited in Ukraine without being granted the status of a legal entity. If a foreign association intends to terminate the activities of its Ukrainian subsidiary, a corresponding application for liquidation must also be submitted to the Ministry of Justice of Ukraine.

=== State registers ===
There are three state registers in Ukraine that contain information about public associations.

The Unified State Register of Legal Entities, Individuals-Entrepreneurs and Public Formations (USR) is a public register of legal entities in Ukraine that performs the role of state control and protection of the rights of legal entities, public formations and entrepreneurs of Ukraine, as well as protection of the rights of third parties in legal relations with them. The register is managed by the Registration Department of the Ministry of Justice. The USR contains comprehensive information on entities registered in Ukraine, including legal entities, individual entrepreneurs and public associations. The information can be accessed free of charge through the official website of the Ministry of Justice of Ukraine.

The Unified Register of Public Formations and the Register of Public Associations are specialised electronic databases containing information on the registration and legalisation of these types of public formations. The registers are maintained by the Ministry of Justice of Ukraine and access to the information is open to the public.

== See also ==
- European Court of Human Rights
- Cabinet of Ministers of Ukraine
- Justice ministry
- Ministry of Justice (Soviet Union)
- Prosecutor General of Ukraine
- High Council of Justice (Ukraine)
- Iryna Mudra
