= Ivan Buravlyov =

Ukrainian lawyer and prosecutor (1942–2024)

- Іван Буравльов
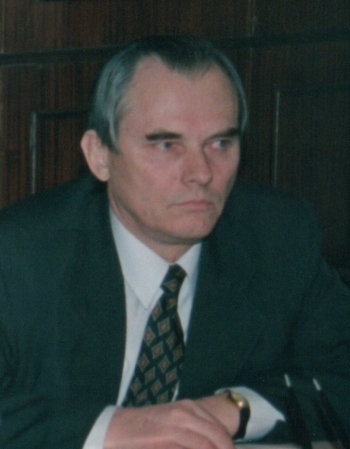
- Ivan Buravlyov in 1996

Deputy Prosecutor General of Ukraine
- In office 9 November 1993 – 5 March 1996

Personal details
- Born: Ivan Ivanovich Buravlyov; 16 January 1942 Solomenskoe, Stepnovsky District, Stavropol Krai, Russian SFSR, Soviet Union
- Died: 23 February 2024 (aged 82) Kyiv, Ukraine
- Education: Taras Shevchenko National University of Kyiv
- Profession: Jurist, prosecutor Rank: 2nd class State Councillor of Justice

Ivan Ivanovich Buravlyov (Ukrainian: Іван Іванович Буравльов; 16 January 1942 – 23 February 2024) was a Ukrainian lawyer and prosecutor. From 1993 to 1996, he served as Deputy Prosecutor General of Ukraine and was a member of the Collegium of the Prosecutor General's Office. His rank was 2nd Class State Councillor of Justice. He was also named Honoured Lawyer of Ukraine in 1982.

== Biography ==
Ivan Buravlyov was born on 16 January 1942 in the village of Solomenskoe, Stepnovsky District, Stavropol Krai, Russian SFSR, USSR.

In 1960, he graduated from Medical College No. 1 in the city of Stavropol. He began his career as the head of the medical assistant station in the hamlet of "Krasny boyets" in Krasnogvardeysky District, Stavropol Krai.

From 1961 to 1964, he served his compulsory military service with the Group of Soviet Forces in Germany. During his service, he held the position of head of the pharmacy at military unit No. 35148.

After demobilization, he pursued higher education at the Faculty of Law of Taras Shevchenko Kyiv University (1964–1968).

Immediately after graduating from university, he began his professional career as an assistant prosecutor for Shchors Raion, Chernihiv Oblast (1968–1973).

In January 1973, he was appointed prosecutor of Borzna Raion, Chernihiv Oblast, a position he held until 1976.

In 1976, he was transferred to the Prosecutor's Office of the Ukrainian SSR in Kyiv, where he served as a prosecutor and senior prosecutor in the Investigative Department from July 1976 to March 1985.

From 1985 to 1990, he worked at the Central Committee of the Communist Party of Ukraine as an instructor and later as head of the Legal Work Sector of the State-Legal Department.

In December 1990, he returned to the Prosecutor's Office of the Ukrainian SSR, which became the Prosecutor General's Office of Ukraine in 1991. He held several senior positions there, including First Deputy Head of the Investigative Department (1990–1992) and Head of the Human Resources Department (1992–1997). For the period from 1993 to 1996, he served as Deputy Prosecutor General of Ukraine, simultaneously holding the position of Head of the Human Resources Department.

On 9 November 1993, he was elected to the Collegium of the Prosecutor General's Office of Ukraine by the Ukrainian Parliament, with 261 members of Parliament voting in favour of his election.

In 1997, he retired on a long-service pension.

From October 1997 to March 2015, he was in the civil service as a research consultant to a judge of the Constitutional Court of Ukraine. He was a civil servant of the 3rd rank (13 December 2002).

He died in Kyiv on 23 February 2024.

== Honours and awards ==
- Honoured Lawyer of Ukraine (1982)
- Honoured Prosecutor of Ukraine (1997)
- Veteran of the Prosecutor's Office of Ukraine (2009)
- Letter of Thanks for long-term exemplary service in the prosecutor's office (2012)
- Letter of Thanks from the Chairman of the Constitutional Court of Ukraine (2005)
- Diploma of the Chairman of the Constitutional Court of Ukraine (2009)

== Bibliography ==
- Бринцев, В. Д.; Буравльов, І. І. (2008). "Конституційність і законність як процесуальні інститути судового контролю: співвідношення і розмежування" [The constitutionality and legality as procedural institutes of judicial control: correlation and division]. Проблеми сучасного українського конституціоналізму [Problems of modern Ukrainian constitutionalism] (PDF) (in Ukrainian). Київ: Логос. pp. 190–205. ISBN 978-966-171-103-6. Archived (PDF) from the original on 24 February 2022.
- Бринцев, В. Д.; Буравльов, І. І. (2012). "Засади діяльності органів прокуратури в контексті рішень Конституційного Суду України" [Principles of the activity of prosecutor's offices in the context of decisions of the Constitutional Court of Ukraine]. Вісник Конституційного Суду України (in Ukrainian). No. 1. pp. 167–177. Archived (PDF) from the original on 6 March 2022.
- Бринцев, В. Д.; Буравльов, І. І. (2012). "Засади діяльності органів прокуратури в контексті рішень Конституційного Суду України (продовження)" [Principles of the activity of prosecutor's offices in the context of decisions of the Constitutional Court of Ukraine (continued)]. Вісник Конституційного Суду України (in Ukrainian). No. 2. pp. 100–109. Archived (PDF) from the original on 6 March 2022.
