= Probation in Ukraine =

System of supervision over offenders in Ukraine ordered by a court

Public Institution "Center of Probation", Ministry of Justice of Ukraine
Agency overview
- Jurisdiction: Ukraine
- Headquarters: 81 Yuri Illienko str, Kyiv, 04050. Location 15, Yevhen Sverstyuk str., Kyiv, 02002
- Motto: Probation of Ukraine - opportunity for change!
- Employees: 3440
- Agency executive: Oleg B. Yanchuk
- Website: Facebook Official website

Probation is a system of supervision and social-pedagogic activities over offender, ordered by a Court and in accordance to the legislation; enforcement of certain types of a criminal penalty, not concerned the deprivation of liberty and to provide the Court with information characterized the offender.

Probation department is a structure sub-vision of Ministry of justice of Ukraine that ensure an implementation of the tasks determined for the Ministry of justice, specifically concerning a formation and realization of public policy in the sphere of criminal penalty execution and probation in accordance with the official law “On probation” from February 5, 2015, adopted by Verhovna Rada of Ukraine (entered into force on August 28, 2015).

== Types of probation ==
In the system of Justice, national probation consists of three types of probation, which are conditioned by the features of legal status of person on probation: pre-trial probation, supervision probation and penitentiary probation.

Pre-trial probation is applying to the offender during a Court proceeding. It consists on formation of a pre-trial report which is a written information characterizing an offender.

The basis for the adaptation of pre-trial probation is a written request of a pre-trial report about offender addressed by the Court to the authority of probation.

The period when the pre-trial probation can be applied depends on the period from the sending off of a written inquiry of the pre-trial report made by the Court of first instance until the judgment pronounced by the Court.

Pre-trial report about offender contains social and psychological characteristics of offender, appreciation of risk to repeat criminal offense and conclusion if there is a possibility of behaviors improving without deprivation of liberty or imprisonment for certain period.

Pre-trial report is preparing according to the special scientific methodology, which identify a possible risk of criminal offence repetition, offenders living conditions which had a negative impact on his behavior and the proposition about possibilities to remove such a negative impact by the means of probation without isolation from the society (because such isolation often promote desocialization and criminalization latter).

Information given by the authority of probation may be taken into consideration by the Court during the announcement of the sentence.

Supervision probation – it is a realization of social and educational measures, which applies to:

- Condemned persons for whom certain offices or certain kind of activities are forbidden;
- Persons to whom a restriction or a deprivation of liberty is replaced by public or correctional works;
- Persons acquitted from penalty with probationary period, acquitted pregnant woman and woman who have children up to three years of age;
- Condemned persons who will be transferred to the correction center.

Under the law, the basis for application supervision probation is a Court decision (Court sentence or judgement) or an act of pardon for changing the severity of penalty.

The period of supervision probation for certain person is determined by the period of penalty (by probation period if condemned person is devoid of serving the penalty). If the person condemned to deprivation of liberty for serving the penalty is directed to the correction center in that case, the period is counting from the moment when the sentence comes into force and until the moment when condemned person arrives in the correction center.

In the period of supervision probation, the following actions are provided:

Supervision – actions provided by the probation authority at workplace, home place or education place, which applies to the condemned person for control the execution of responsibilities which are laid down in the legislation and were pronounced by the Court. According to standards, preview in Council of Europe Probation Rules 2010, besides the control, which envisages the application of more severe penalty in case of no-execution of penalty by condemned person, supervision envisages acts of support of condemned person in the society, which are provided by the probation service.

Social and educational work – actions provided in accordance with individual plans of work with condemned persons taking into account the risk to repeat a criminal offense and envisages a differential approach during consultations, physiological assistance or others kinds of help; assistance for placing in a job; promotion of education; participation in social projects and corrective activities; providing of individual preventive work (case-management or individual manage of case).

Realization of probation programs (decree of The Cabinet of Ministers of Ukraine from January 18, 2017, No. 24).

Probation programs are destined for a person who is devoid of serving the penalty and envisage a complex of activities directed to correction social behavior, creation of social adapted changes for person which are susceptible to be verified (by the means of physiological correctional programs and programs of social adaptation conducted to eliminate negative factors which could influence on behavior of offender). At the period of supervision probation the law “On probation” permits to engage volunteers in actions on supervision and realization a social and correctional work with condemned persons. Volunteer is a physical person over the age of 18, authorized by Probation authority to implement voluntary and for free certain of assignments connected to the probation.

In pursuance of the Statute about organization of volunteer activity at probation, approved by the decree of Ministry of Justice of Ukraine from January 17, 2017, No.98/5 the activity of volunteers will be performed on following senses:

- Implementation of supervision activities at the work or education place of condemned persons;
- Carrying out a social and educational work with condemned persons;
- Elaboration and realization of personal plans with condemned persons;
- Carrying out a social and preventive work with condemned persons;
- Providing of consultations, psychological and others types of assistance to condemned persons;
- Providing assistance for placing in a job, to attract condemned persons to education, educational activities and social helpful activities;
- Realization of probation programs which concern persons devoid of serving the penalty;
- Implementation of activities of preparation of persons who are serving theirs penalties by the means of deprivation of liberty or imprisonment for certain period until discharge. Realization of others activities directed to improvement of condemned persons and to prevent a repetition of a criminal offence by condemned person.

Condemned persons have a right to choose a form of volunteer assistance in probation or to change a volunteer. The person should hand in an application for volunteering, to fill in a form, to be interviewed by the employee of Probation agency and to be added into the list on the basis of decision of head of probation.

The mission for volunteer in probation is designated by the probation authority taking into consideration experience of work, education, moral and professional qualities, suggestions and propositions made by volunteer. Action of volunteer at probation, concerned acts of supervision and control of respect of Court sentence envisage only participation of volunteers in such activities. The volunteer inform a probation employee about results of supervision and about respect of rules by condemned person. Just the employee of probation service can assume the measures in case of violation of terms of probation by condemned person. The probation authority concludes a treaty with volunteer about volunteering at probation.

Penitentiary probation – is a preparation of persons who are serving theirs penalties of deprivation of liberty or imprisonment for certain period until the discharging for the purpose of work and domestic adaptation of condemned persons in accordance to theirs home places.

The activities of probation are provided by the Probation authority at the future home place of condemned person. The actions mentioned above can be realized on the basis of establishment administration request during one month from the day of request receipt with the attracting the authority social patronage of uncharged definite by a special law.

The probation service in accordance with the future home place of condemned person, on the basis of establishment administration request, with state authorities and local authorities to assist condemned persons who are preparing to jail release:

- To define a home place after jail release;
- To place into a specialized establishments for uncharged persons;
- Hospitalization to the medical establishments for those who need a medical assistance;
- Job placement for persons capable of working.

Juvenile probation

The law of Ukraine “On Probation” indicates a special probation, which applies to minors:

- The aim of probation on minors is to ensure their normal physical and mental development: prevention of aggressive behavior; motivation of positive changes of personality; improvement of social relations.
- Pre-trial report about minor condemned person should contain information about influence of criminogenic factors on behavior of condemned person; recommendations for minimization of risk of criminal offence repetition.
- Parents or legal representative of minor condemned person can be engage in social and educational work with minor offenders.
- The activities of probation are realized in cooperation with juvenile agencies and specialized services which provide a social care and preventive measures of repetition of criminal offence.

Probations programs for minor condemned persons are realized with a central authority of executive power which organizes a social policy of the state.

== Main tasks of probation ==
Main tasks of probation are:

- Preparation of pre-trial reports concerning condemned persons;
- Supervision on condemned persons for whom certain offices or certain kind of activities are forbidden, persons to whom a restriction or a deprivation of liberty is replaced by public works or correctional works, persons acquitted from penalty with probationary period, acquitted pregnant woman and woman who have children up to three years of age;
- Execution of certain types of penalty not linked to deprivation of liberty;
- Ensure the arrive of condemned persons to the prisons or to the correction centers;
- Realization of probation programs concerning persons uncharged from the offence with probationary period;
- Carrying out a social and educational work with condemned persons;
- Implementation of activities of preparation of persons who are serving theirs penalties by the means of deprivation of liberty of imprisonment for certain period until discharge.
- Realization of others activities directed to improvement of condemned persons and to prevent a repetition of a criminal offence by condemned person.

== Actors of probation ==
Persons to whom action of probation applies:

- Condemned persons to whom a pre-trial report is preparing by probation authority;
- Condemned persons for whom certain offices or certain kind of activities are forbidden;
- Persons to whom a restriction or a deprivation of liberty is replaced by public works or correctional works;
- Persons acquitted from penalty with probationary period, acquitted pregnant woman and woman who have children up to three years of age;
- Condemned persons who will be transferred to the correction center.
- Implementation of activities of preparation of persons who are serving theirs penalties by the means of deprivation of liberty of imprisonment for certain period until discharge.

Actors of probation have a right for:

- Participation in preparation of pre-trial report;
- Participation in elaboration of personal plans of work with condemned person;
- Clarification of theirs rights and obligations;
- Receiving of information about conditions of service of sentence and supervision;
- Receiving of information about possible assistance and consultation;
- Participation in programs and activities which are organized by the Probation agency;
- Maintenance of legal regime of information with restricted access;
- To dispute decisions, actions or inactivity provided by probation staff.

Actors of probation are required to:

- Execute Court sentence;
- Not to realize an offence;
- Execute legal demands of probation staff;
- Give trustworthy information to probation staff.

All right of man and citizen laid down in the Constitution of Ukraine except some restrictions preview by the Ukrainian legislation and jurisprudence are applies to person on probation.

== Advantages of probation ==
=== For offenders ===
- A possibility to improve themselves without staying in facilities where liberty is restricted (isolation from the society), support during improvement;
- Preservation of family and public relations;
- Preservation of job and home place;
- Positive social effect: person keeps social relations and a chance to set up a family.

=== For society ===
- Preservation of society from the repetition of offences;
- Equity justice, presence of balance between the penalty for an offence, damages exemplary and public interests.

=== For the state ===
- Decrease of criminality;
- Decrease of numbers of imprisonment persons;
- Positive economic effect: retention of offenders in facilities where liberty is restricted is much more expensive, than keeping them on probation; also condemned person saves a job place which means that person makes a tax-payment to the state budget;
- Complying with European standards.

== History of probation in Ukraine ==
In May 2002 the first official initiative to establish the probation service was submitted to the Cabinet of Ministers of Ukraine by the State Department on Enforcement of Sentences following a visit to the Prisons and Probation Service of the Kingdom of Sweden.

On May 28, 2002, the Cabinet of Ministers of Ukraine issued the Order to the State Department of Ukraine on Enforcement of Sentences (ref. 3974/84) in order to approve its proposal to establish the probation service and prepare the first conceptual proposals for probation in Ukraine.

After studying the proposals, which had been prepared by the Ministry of Justice, Ministry of Internal Affairs, Ministry of Labor and Social Policy, General Prosecutor's Office, Supreme Court of Ukraine, as well as interested NGOs and scholars, the State Department of Ukraine on Enforcement of Sentences formed the first vision of necessary legislative changes. Unfortunately, due to the novelty of the proposed legislative provisions, the issue of introducing probation in Ukraine was discussed and debated for almost six years. The probation introduction in Ukraine was included in the following state concepts: the Concept of the criminal justice reform of Ukraine, approved by the Decree of the President of Ukraine on April 8, 2008 (ref. 311/2008) and the Concept of reforming the State Penitentiary Service of Ukraine, approved by the Decree of the President of Ukraine on April 25, 2008 (ref. 401/2008).

On November 26, 2008, in the Verkhovna Rada of Ukraine the People's Deputy of Ukraine V. Shvets registered the draft laws of Ukraine “On Probation Service” (ref. 3412) and “On amendments to certain legislative acts of Ukraine (on humanization of the criminal law and organizational legal preconditions for the probation introduction) ”(ref. 3413).

It will be fair to mention the registration of one more legislative initiative with a proposal to define probation as a type of release from punishment - the draft law of Ukraine "On amendments to certain legislative acts of Ukraine (on humanization of the criminal law through the probation introduction)", which was registered by O. Feldman on November 28, 2008 (ref. 3413–1) as an alternative to the previous draft law (ref. 3413). It became the competitive element, which initiated constructive discussions on the content of probation in Ukraine.

Unfortunately, the discussion and promotion of the draft laws (ref. 3412 and 3413) was slowed down, because of the interdepartmental contradictions regarding the organization of the probation agency subordination (either the new independent body of executive power or the unit in the structure of the State Department of Ukraine on Enforcement of Sentences, which would provide the function of execution of the alternative sanctions).

On the other hand, the postponement of the agreed decision gave the possibility to continue discussions on the concept of probation, as well as to take into account the experience of foreign countries, which created and improved their probation systems.

New views on the content of the above-mentioned draft laws emerged. Thus, on January 20, 2010, the Committee of Ministers of the Council of Europe adopted Recommendation CM/Rec(2010)1 on the European probation rules, which specified functioning of the modern European probation systems.

A new impetus for intensifying the development of the probation legislation in Ukraine was the Concept on development of the criminal justice for juveniles in Ukraine, which was approved by the Decree of the President of Ukraine on May 24, 2011 (ref. 597/2011). Despite the fact that the Concept referred only to the juvenile probation, it became clear that work on the probation system would continue.

The concept of the state policy in the sphere of reforming the State Penitentiary Service of Ukraine, which was approved by the Decree of the President of Ukraine on November 8, 2012 (ref. 631/2012), one of six conceptual areas of reforming the Service envisaged the enhancement of the non-custodial sentences effectiveness and provided for measures to create legal and logistical conditions for reforming the criminal-executive inspection into the probation service.

On January 4, 2013, there were registered the new draft laws in the sphere of probation: the draft Law “On the Probation Service” (ref. 1197); the draft Law “On amendments to certain legislative acts of Ukraine (regarding humanization of the criminal law through the probation introduction)” (ref. 1198). The subject of that legislative initiative was the People's Deputy of Ukraine V. Shvets (the re-registration of the previous draft laws of 2008 actually took place).

The draft Law "On Probation" (ref. 1197–1) was registered on January 18, 2013 (it was a reflection of the new view on the legislative regulation of the probation issues). The subject of that legislative initiative was the Cabinet of Ministers of Ukraine.

On March 22, 2013, those draft laws were considered by the Permanent Committee of the Verkhovna Rada of Ukraine on Legislative Support of the Law Enforcement Activities. It made the decision to recommend to the Verkhovna Rada of Ukraine to adopt the draft Law (ref. 1197–1) as a basis.

On October 10, 2013, the Verkhovna Rada of Ukraine (282 positive votes) adopted the Law of Ukraine “On Probation” (ref. 1197–1) in the first reading.

More than one year later, on February 5, 2015, the Verkhovna Rada of Ukraine adopted the Law of Ukraine “On Probation” (230 positive votes) and came into force on August 27, 2015. Thus, the Verkhovna Rada of Ukraine made the real step in approximation of the justice of Ukraine to the international standards and introduction of the fundamentally new system of the criminal law measures – probation. Thirteen years of hesitation and discussion in the scientific and political circles about the expediency and timeliness of such reform in Ukraine were put to the end.

Measures to create and develop the national model of probation were included in the Strategy of reforming the judiciary and related legal institutions for the period 2015-2020 (Decree of the President of Ukraine of 20.05.2015, ref. 276) and the National strategy in the sphere of human rights (Decree of the President of Ukraine of 25.08.2015, ref. 501).

The legal basis has been created for the introduction of the national probation system, which is defined as the system of the supervisory and social-educational measures applied by the court decision in accordance with the Law “On convicts”. It also envisages pre-trial reports for the courts (information, which characterizes the accused persons in order the courts decide on the extent of their responsibility).

Despite all the shortcomings of the Law of Ukraine "On Probation", which is still criticized and needs further improvement, the international experts say that the Law meets the European standards of probation.

The provisions of the Law of Ukraine "On Probation" were harmonized with other laws by adopting the Law of Ukraine of September 7, 2016 (ref.1492-VIII) "On amendments to certain legislative acts of Ukraine related to enforcement of sentences and protection of the rights of convicts". The Law amended the Criminal Code, the Criminal-Executive Code and the Criminal-Procedural Code of Ukraine (in particular, the authorized probation units were added to the list of the penitentiary bodies; the pre-trial reports procedure was created; probation supervision, probation programmes and measures were envisaged).

In March 2016 the Ministry of Justice of Ukraine started the reform of the State Penitentiary Service and created in its structure the central probation department and probation units at 6 interregional prison and probation departments.

The authorized probation units formed the structure of the national probation. Actually, they started to function on January 1, 2017. On that date there were 498 authorized probation units with 3,300 officers (lawyers, social workers and psychologists).

In order to create the full-fledged probation system the Public Institution "Center of Probation" was established by the Order of the Cabinet of Ministers of Ukraine of September 13, 2017 (ref.655-p). It improved organizational structure and the mechanism of using the financial, material and technical means for the effective functioning of the probation units, which were subordinated to the Center of Probation.

On January 1, 2020 there was the Public Institution "Center of Probation", 24 regional units and 574 local units of the probation service, as well as 14 juvenile probation sectors. Their activities were provided by 3,022 employees (lawyers, social workers and psychologists).

On January 1, 2020, there were 60,736 sentenced persons, who had been registered by the authorized probation units, in particular:

- 2,985 persons (4.9%) were punished in the form of deprivation of the right to hold certain jobs (positions) or to be engaged in certain activities;
- 3,104 persons (5%) - were punished in the form of community works;
- 459 persons (0.8%) - were punished in the form of correctional works;
- 50,266 persons (82.8%) finished their probation period;
- 3,922 persons (6.5%) - were punished in the form of a fine.

The pre-trial probation statistics (on January 1, 2020):

- 30,089 (92%) pre-trial reports were prepared;
- 20,567 (68%) accused persons used the right to participate in the preparation of the pre-trial reports;
- probation opinion on the possibility of correction of the accused persons without restriction or deprivation of liberty of 23,878 (79%) was provided to the courts;
- in 9,209 (90%) court sentences the probation opinion in the pre-trial report was taken into account.

The penitentiary probation statistics (on January 1, 2020):

- 6,410 (82%) answers to the pre-agreed questions on the sentenced persons’ residence after their release;
- 2,014 (95%) answers to the pre-agreed questions on the sentenced persons’ employment after their release.

== See also ==
- European Court of Human Rights
- Cabinet of Ministers of Ukraine
- Justice ministry
- Prosecutor General of Ukraine
- High Council of Justice (Ukraine)
