= Hryhoriy Vorsinov =

Ukrainian lawyer (1935–2005)

- Григорій Ворсінов

Prosecutor General of Ukraine
- In office 19 October 1995 – 22 July 1997

Personal details
- Born: Hryhoriy Trokhymovych Vorsinov; 23 October 1935 Lipchanka, Bogucharsky District, Voronezh Oblast, Russian SFSR, USSR
- Died: 8 December 2005 (aged 70) Dnipropetrovsk, Ukraine
- Education: Saratov State Academy of Law
- Profession: Jurist, prosecutor Rank: State Counselor of Justice of Ukraine
- Hryhoriy Vorsinov's voice The recording was made during the official sessions of the Verkhovna Rada. Recorded 5 March 1996

Hryhoriy Trokhymovych Vorsinov (Ukrainian: Григорій Трохимович Ворсінов; 23 October 1935 – 8 December 2005) was a Ukrainian lawyer and prosecutor. He served as the Prosecutor General of Ukraine from October 19, 1995, to July 22, 1997. He held the title of State Counselor of Justice of Ukraine and was awarded the title of Honored Lawyer of Ukraine in 1994.

== Biography ==
In 1961, he graduated from the Saratov Law Institute.

He worked in the prosecutor's offices of the Voroshilovgrad and Dnipropetrovsk regions in various positions, including investigator, assistant prosecutor of a district and city, and district prosecutor.

From 1975 to 1985, he served as the Prosecutor of Voroshilovgrad, from 1985 to 1991 as the Prosecutor of Dnipropetrovsk, and from 1991 to 1995 as the Prosecutor of Dnipropetrovsk region.

From October 19, 1995, to July 22, 1997, he was the Prosecutor General of Ukraine. Afterward, he worked as an advisor to the Chairman of the Dnipropetrovsk Regional State Administration.

He died on December 8, 2005, and was buried at the Zaporizhzhia Cemetery in Dnipro.
