= Fedir Hlukh =

Soviet and Ukrainian lawyer and statesman

- Федір Глух

Minister of Justice of the Ukrainian SSR
- In office 1953–1957

Chairman of the Supreme Court of Ukrainian SSR
- In office 1957–1963

Prosecutor of the Ukrainian SSR
- In office 1963–1983

Personal details
- Born: Fedir Kyrylovych Hlukh; 18 September 1912 Beieve, Gadyachsky Uyezd, Poltava Governorate, Russian Empire
- Died: 3 August 1984 (aged 71) Kyiv, Ukrainian SSR, USSR
- Education: Yaroslav Mudryi National Law University
- Profession: Jurist, prosecutor Rank: 1st class State Councillor of Justice
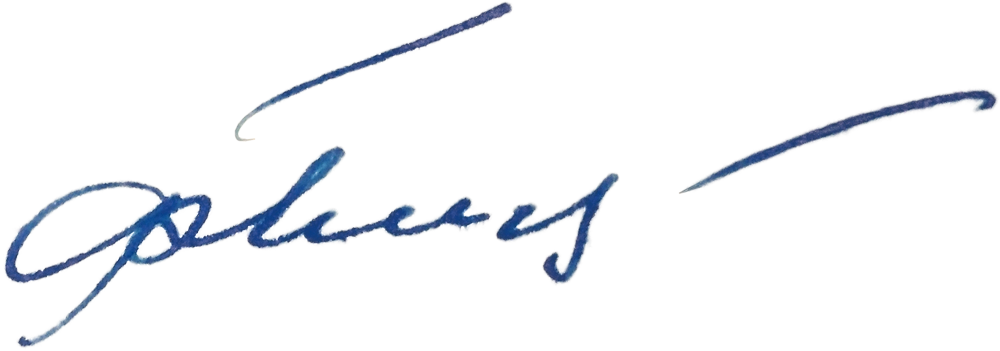
- Signature

Fedir Kyrylovych Hlukh (Ukrainian: Фе́дір Кири́лович Глух; 18 September 1912 – 3 August 1984, Kyiv) was a Soviet Ukrainian lawyer and statesman. He served as Minister of Justice of the Ukrainian SSR (1953–1957), Chairman of the Supreme Court of the Ukrainian SSR (1957–1963), and Prosecutor of the Ukrainian SSR (1963–1983). He was a Deputy of the Supreme Soviet of the Ukrainian SSR (4th–10th convocations). From 1960 to 1966, he was a member of the Auditing Commission of the Communist Party of Ukraine, from 1966 to 1976 he was a candidate member of the Central Committee, and from 1976 to 1984 he was a Member of the Central Committee of the CPU. He was awarded the title of Honoured Jurist of the Ukrainian SSR in 1972. Glukh held the rank of State Counsellor of Justice 1st Class.

== Biography ==
Fedir Hlukh was born into a peasant family on 18 September 1912 in the village of Beieve, Romny Raion, Sumy Oblast.

After completing a seven-year rural school, he studied at the Hadiach Pedagogical College, finishing three years of the course in 1933. He began his career in June 1933 as a teacher at a junior secondary school in the Luhansk region, later working as the head of a kindergarten.

From April 1934 to August 1935, Hlukh served in the Red Army. After demobilisation, he enrolled at the Kharkiv Law Institute, graduating in 1939. He then began working in the prosecutor's office of Ukraine and Kazakhstan, rising from district prosecutor to Prosecutor of the Ukrainian SSR. From 1939 to 1941, he served as the prosecutor of the Chervonozavodskyi District of Kharkiv.

A member of the All-Union Communist Party (Bolsheviks) since 1940, Hlukh held various positions within the Soviet legal and Communist Party structures. From 1941 to 1943, he was assistant prosecutor of Aktobe Oblast in the Kazakh SSR, and later, the prosecutor of the city of Aktobe. In 1943, he became the head of the Personnel Department at the Prosecutor's Office of the Ukrainian SSR.

From 1943 to 1944, he worked as an instructor in the Personnel Department of the Central Committee of the Communist Party of Ukraine, and from 1944 to 1947, as head of the Personnel Sector at the CPU Central Committee.

In 1947, Hlukh was appointed Deputy Prosecutor of the Ukrainian SSR. From January 1953 to March 1957, he served as Minister of Justice of the Ukrainian SSR, and from May 1957 to January 1963, he held the position of Chairman of the Supreme Court of the Ukrainian SSR.

He served as Prosecutor of the Ukrainian SSR for two decades, from February 1963 until his retirement in January 1983.

He was awarded the Order of Lenin, the Order of the October Revolution, the Order of the Red Banner of Labour, as well as medals "For the Victory over Germany in the Great Patriotic War 1941–1945", "50 Years of the Soviet Militia", "In Commemoration of the 100th Anniversary of the Birth of Vladimir Ilyich Lenin", "Thirty Years of Victory in the Great Patriotic War 1941–1945", "In Commemoration of the 1500th Anniversary of Kiev", and honorary certificates from the Supreme Soviet of the USSR (1963, 1982). In 1972, he was awarded the honorary title "Honoured Jurist of the Ukrainian SSR".

Hlukh died on 3 August 1984 in Kyiv.
