= Vitaly Kasko =

Ukrainian lawyer

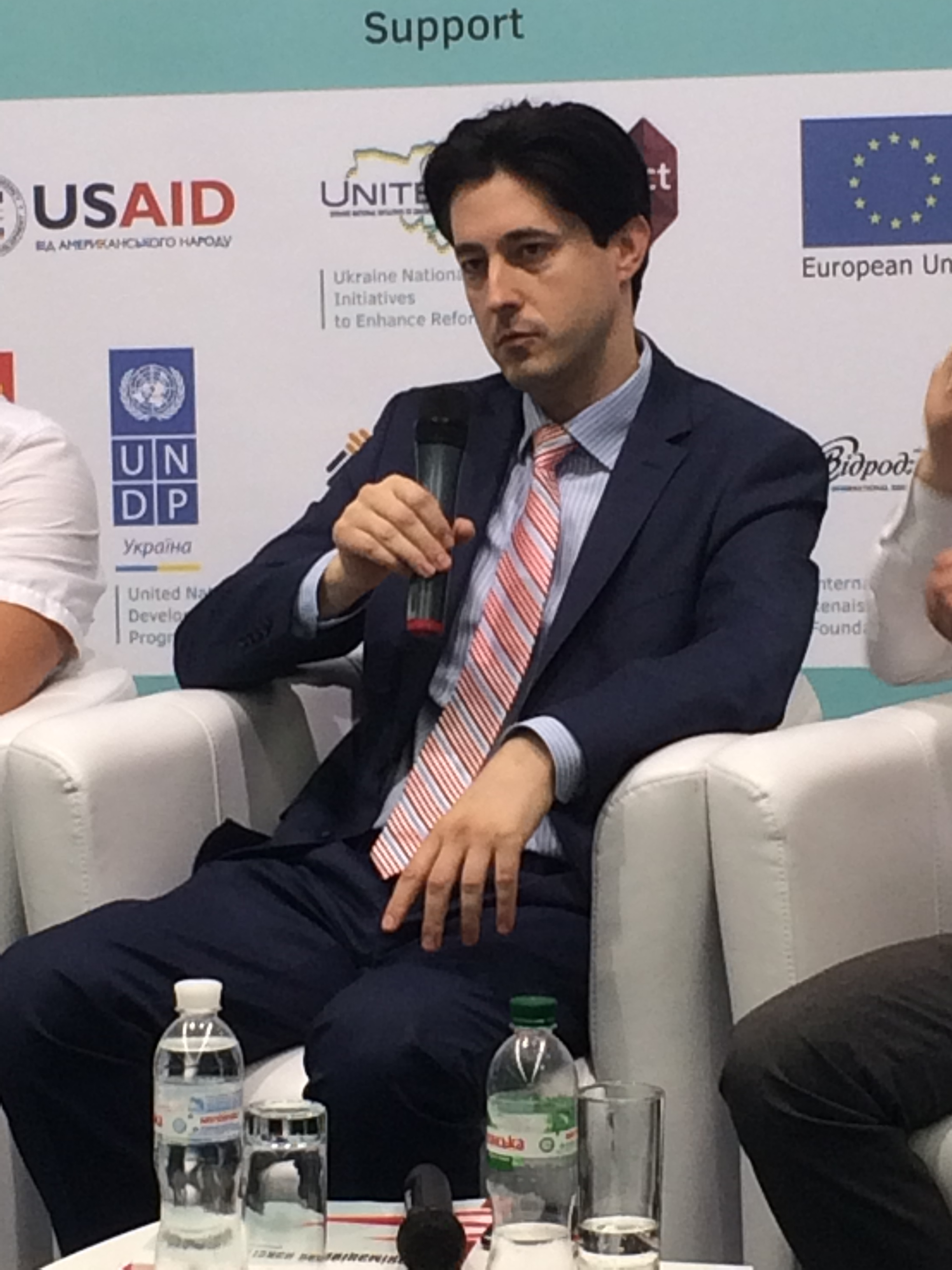
Vitaly Kasko in 2015

Vitaly Kasko (Ukrainian: Віталій Вікторович Касько; born 29 June 1976) is a Ukrainian lawyer and two time Deputy Prosecutor General of Ukraine. Honored Lawyer of Ukraine (2019).

Kasko first tenure as Deputy Prosecutor General, under Viktor Shokin, started in 2014. He resigned on February 15, 2016 denouncing the corruption and "total lawlessness" of the Prosecutor's office. In late March 2016, just before Shokin's dismissal, Kasko was accused of fraud and had his apartment seized in what he claims was a revenge for his criticism.

Late April 2016 Kasko was board member of Transparency International Ukraine.

Kasko was again appointed First Deputy Prosecutor General on 5 September 2019 (working under Prosecutor General Ruslan Riaboshapka). After Riaboshapka was dismissed by the Ukrainian parliament on 5 March 2020 Kasko resigned the following day.
