= Oleh Makhnitskyi =

Ukrainian politician and lawyer

- Олег Махніцький
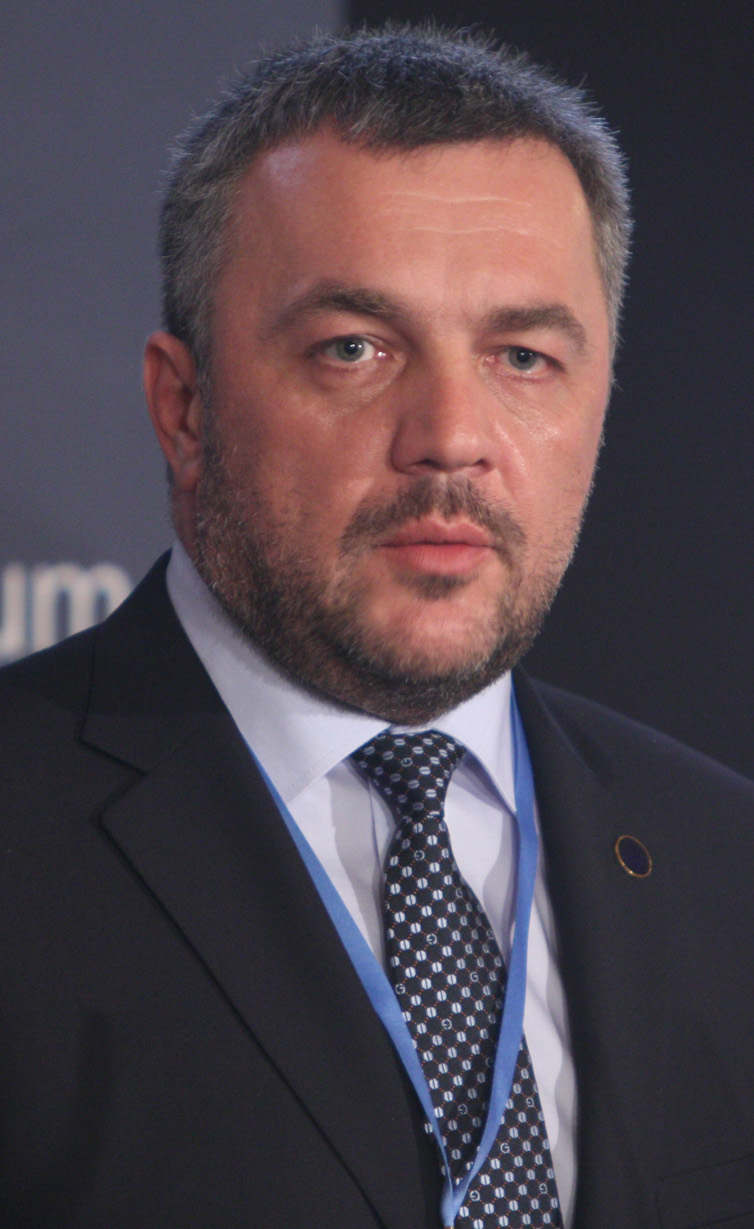
- Makhnitskyi in 2014

Prosecutor General of Ukraine
- Acting
- In office 24 February 2014 – 18 June 2014
- President: Oleksandr Turchynov (acting); Petro Poroshenko
- Preceded by: Viktor Pshonka
- Succeeded by: Vitaliy Yarema

People's Deputy of Ukraine
- In office 12 December 2012 – 27 November 2014
- Constituency: Svoboda, No. 21

Personal details
- Born: 15 March 1970 (age 56) Lviv, Ukrainian SSR, Soviet Union
- Party: Svoboda
- Education: Lviv University

Oleh Ihorovych Makhnitskyi (Ukrainian: Олег Ігорович Махніцький; born 15 March 1970) is a Ukrainian politician and lawyer who served as a People's Deputy of Ukraine from 2012 to 2014, representing the Svoboda party. In addition, from 24 February 2014 to 18 June 2014, he served as Acting Prosecutor General of Ukraine under Petro Poroshenko, until he was replaced by Vitaly Yarema.

== Early life ==
Makhnitskyi was born on 15 March 1970 in Lviv, which was then part of the Ukrainian SSR in the Soviet Union. After completing his schooling, starting in 1996, he began working on the prosecutor's office of the Lviv Oblast. he also, for a brief time, worked in the prosecutor's office of the Frankivskyi District of Lviv. He then became the Head of the Investigative Department of the Prosecutor's Office for Lviv Oblast.

== Political career ==
In 2004, he formally became a member of Svoboda. He was initially elected to the Verkhovna Rada for the VII convocation during the 2012 Ukrainian parliamentary election. He was part of the groups for relations with Poland, Latvia, Italy, and the Netherlands, among others, until he resigned in 2014.

He served as Parliamentary Commissioner for the supervision of the General Prosecutor of Ukraine from 22 February 2014.

From 24 February 2014, Makhnitskyi was acting Prosecutor General. On the day of his appointment, Makhnitskyi resigned from his membership in Svoboda. President Petro Poroshenko dismissed Makhnitskyi on 18 June 2014 following his own request to resign.

In February 2016, Makhnitskyi publicly accused the former Head of the Ministry of Internal Affairs, Arsen Avakov, and then Deputy Prosecutor General, Viktor Shokin, of obstructing investigations into the crimes committed by the government during the Revolution of Dignity. In particular, he stated they obstructed investigations into the Berkut forces and employees of the Prosecutor General's Office because it "negatively affected them".

== Suspicion in corruption ==
In July 2014 an internet newspaper nedelya-ua.com published an article of unknown author with allegation of the Makhnitsky's real estate possessions in London that worth around €8.5 million.
