= Vasyl Poraiko =

Ukrainian Soviet statesman and lawyer (1888–1937)

- Василь Іванович Порайко
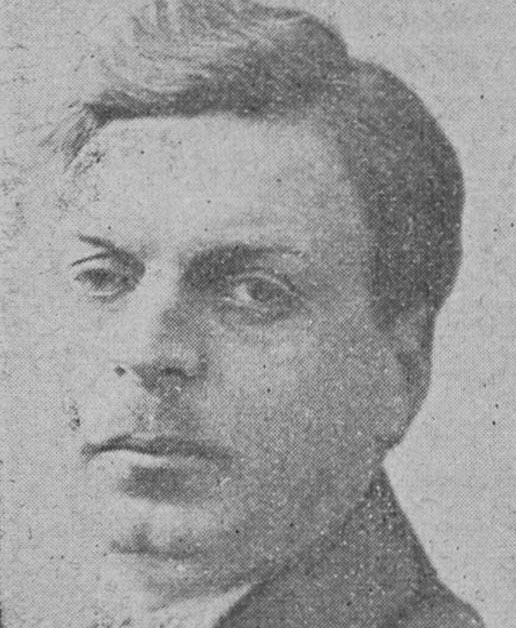
- Poraiko in 1927

Deputy Chairman of the Council of People's Commissars of the Ukrainian SSR
- In office 3 September 1930 – 13 August 1937
- Premier: Vlas Chubar; Panas Lyubchenko

People's Commissar for Justice of the Ukrainian SSR & Prosecutor General
- In office 5 March 1927 – 3 September 1930
- Premier: Vlas Chubar
- Preceded by: Mykola Skrypnyk
- Succeeded by: Vasiliy Polyakov

Commander of the Red Ukrainian Galician Army
- In office February 1920 – April 1920

Personal details
- Born: 12 October 1888 Ustia, Galicia-Lodomeria, Austria-Hungary
- Died: 25 October 1937 (aged 49) Kyiv, Ukrainian SSR, Soviet Union
- Resting place: Bykivnia graves
- Party: Ukrainian Radical Party (1908–1914); All-Union Communist Party (Bolshevik) (1918–1937)
- Education: Chernivtsi University; University of Lviv

Vasyl Ivanovych Poraiko (Ukrainian: Василь Іванович Порайко; Polish: Wasyl Porajko; 12 October 1888 – 25 October 1937) was a Ukrainian Soviet statesman, economist, and lawyer. Born in Austria-Hungary, he was active in the Ukrainian student movement in Galicia and served in the Ukrainian Sich Riflemen during World War I before being captured by Russian forces. After the October Revolution, he joined the Bolsheviks, commanded the Red Ukrainian Galician Army (ChUGA) in 1920, and held senior government posts in the Ukrainian SSR, including People's Commissar for Justice, Prosecutor General, and Deputy Chairman of the Council of People's Commissars. He was executed during the Great Purge in 1937 and posthumously rehabilitated in 1957.

== Early life and education ==
Poraiko was born on 12 October 1888 into a large peasant family in the village of Ustia-nad-Prutom (now Ustia, Ivano-Frankivsk Oblast), then part of the Kingdom of Galicia and Lodomeria in Austria-Hungary. The eldest of five surviving children of Ivan and Mariia Poraiko, he worked as a farmhand in his childhood while his father worked as a seasonal laborer, postman, and school watchman. With financial support from his younger siblings who had emigrated to Canada in 1907 and 1913, as well as assistance from fellow villagers, he completed primary school, studied in Sniatyn, and graduated with honors from the Ukrainian gymnasium in Kolomyia in 1910.

Between 1908 and 1914, Poraiko was a member of the Ukrainian Radical Party. During his secondary schooling, he briefly attended the Lviv Academic Gymnasium (1906–1907), where he was mentored by educator Ludwig Salo.

In 1910, Poraiko enrolled in the Faculty of Law at Chernivtsi University, transferring to Lviv University in 1911. In July 1910, he was arrested in Lviv for participating in student demonstrations demanding a separate Ukrainian university in Galicia. He became a defendant in the political "Trial of the 101" (Процес 101) in 1911, was sentenced to one month's imprisonment for "public violence," and was temporarily suspended from Lviv University in January 1912 before being amnestied and graduating in 1914. While living in Sniatyn between 1912 and 1914, he worked as a legal clerk for lawyer and writer Marko Cheremshyna and held leadership roles in local branches of the Sich and Prosvita societies.

== World War I and Russian Civil War ==
Following the outbreak of World War I in August 1914, Poraiko was mobilized into the Austro-Hungarian Army and served as a rifleman (стрілець) in the 8th company of the Ukrainian Sich Riflemen (USS) under Osyp Bukshovanyi. In March 1915, he was captured by the Imperial Russian Army and held in prisoner-of-war camps in Chyorny Yar and Astrakhan until 1918, where for a time he was interned alongside future Ukrainian nationalist leader Yevhen Konovalets.

Influenced by revolutionary agitation in captivity, Poraiko welcomed the October Revolution of 1917 and joined the Russian Communist Party (Bolsheviks) in October 1918. He chaired the Astrakhan Provincial Council of National Economy and served on the provincial executive committee.

In the spring of 1919, Bolshevik authorities dispatched Poraiko to Ukraine to organize Soviet structures for Eastern Galicia. He headed the Temporary Committee of Eastern Galicia (later the Galician Revolutionary Committee) and joined the Galician Bureau of the Central Committee of the Communist Party (Bolsheviks) of Ukraine (CP(b)U) and the Presidium of the Temporary Committee of Communists of Eastern Galicia and Bukovina.

From February to April 1920, Poraiko served as commander of the Red Ukrainian Galician Army (ChUGA), formed after units of the Ukrainian Galician Army (UHA) allied with the Red Army. Working alongside Volodymyr Zatonsky, he oversaw the reorganization of the Galician formations into Red Army brigades and conducted political agitation among the troops. After two brigades of ChUGA defected to the Ukrainian People's Army in late April 1920, the CP(b)U leadership removed Poraiko from Galician affairs in May 1920 and reassigned him to administrative posts in central Ukraine.

== Soviet state career ==
In May 1920, Poraiko chaired the Kyiv Provincial Council of National Economy. He subsequently served as Chairman of the Executive Committee of the Poltava Provincial Council (June 1920 – July 1921) and Chairman of the Executive Committee of the Podillia Provincial Council in Vinnytsia (August 1921 – June 1923). On 30 December 1922, he was among the Ukrainian SSR delegates who signed the Treaty on the Creation of the Union of Soviet Socialist Republics.

Moving to Kharkiv (then the capital of Soviet Ukraine), Poraiko served as Deputy Chairman of the Little Council of People's Commissars (1923–1924) and chaired the board of the Ukrainian Agricultural Bank from December 1923 to March 1927.

On 5 March 1927, Poraiko was appointed People's Commissar for Justice of the Ukrainian SSR and Prosecutor General, serving until 3 September 1930. In this capacity, he oversaw judicial administration, chaired the All-Ukrainian Committee for Aid to Crimea following the 1927 Crimean earthquakes, and from 1929 to 1932 served as deputy chairman and chairman of the Central Government Commission for the Ukrainization of the Soviet apparatus. In January 1930, he was also included in a special commission drafting policies on dekulakization.

From 3 September 1930 to 9 February 1932, Poraiko served as Deputy Chairman of the Council of People's Commissars of the Ukrainian SSR, overseeing transport, communications, and nationalities policy. After briefly heading the Executive Committee of the Kharkiv Oblast Council (March–July 1932), he was appointed Second Deputy Chairman of the Council of People's Commissars on 16 July 1932, a post he held until his arrest in August 1937. Concurrently, from 1932 to August 1935, he acted as the Permanent Representative of the Government of the Ukrainian SSR to the Council of People's Commissars of the Soviet Union in Moscow. He was a member of the All-Ukrainian Central Executive Committee (5th–13th convocations), the Central Executive Committee of the Soviet Union, the Central Committee of the CP(b)U (1927–1937), and its Organizational Bureau (1930–1937).

== Arrest, execution, and rehabilitation ==
On 13 August 1937, during the Great Purge, Poraiko was arrested by the NKVD on fabricated charges of economic sabotage, membership in an alleged "bourgeois-nationalist anti-Soviet organization of former Borotbists," and participation in the Ukrainian Military Organization (UVO), as well as espionage for German and Polish intelligence. Following interrogations in Moscow and Kyiv, the Military Collegium of the Supreme Court of the Soviet Union sentenced him to death on 24 October 1937. He was executed by firing squad in Kyiv on 25 October 1937 and buried in a mass grave in the Bykivnia forest outside the city. His siblings in Galicia, Hafiia and Illia, were later arrested by Soviet security organs in 1945–1946.

Following a review initiated by his wife, Nadiia Morozova-Poraiko, the Military Collegium of the Supreme Court of the USSR overturned his conviction on 26 March 1957 for lack of corpus delicti, and he was posthumously rehabilitated and reinstated in the Communist Party in July 1957. His son, Vsevolod Poraiko (1927–2014), later lived and worked as an architect in Germany under the name Waldemar Poreike.

== Sources ==
- Amons, A. I.; Abramenko, L. M. (2009). Репресовані прокурори в Україні: документи, нариси, матеріали [Repressed Prosecutors in Ukraine: Documents, Essays, Materials] (in Ukrainian). Kyiv: Istyna. ISBN 978-966-8909-12-2.
- Arsenych, P. I.; Holubova, H. H. (1968). "Видатний громадсько-політичний діяч (До 80-річчя з дня народження В. І. Порайка)" [An Outstanding Public and Political Figure (On the 80th Anniversary of V. I. Poraiko's Birth)]. Ukrainian Historical Journal (in Ukrainian) (9): 119–120.
- Boida, Andrii (2022). "Причини фізичної ліквідації Василя Івановича Порайка в 1937 р." [Reasons for the Physical Liquidation of Vasyl Ivanovych Poraiko in 1937]. Siverianskyi Litopys (in Ukrainian) (4): 99–114.
- Boida, Andrii (2023). "Основні юридичні процеси щодо посмертної реабілітації В. І. Порайка в 1954—1957 рр" [Main Legal Proceedings Regarding the Posthumous Rehabilitation of V. I. Poraiko in 1954–1957]. Siverianskyi Litopys (in Ukrainian) (2): 79–90.
- Boida, Andrii (2024). "Постать Василя Порайка у свідченнях Миколи Межуєва (за матеріалами слідчої справи)" [The Figure of Vasyl Poraiko in the Testimonies of Mykola Mezhuiev (Based on Investigation Case Materials)]. Siverianskyi Litopys (in Ukrainian) (5): 121–134.
- Boida, Andrii (2024). "Участь Василя Порайка та братів Гоївих в роботі секції Українського Студентського Союзу в м. Снятин (1911–1921)" [Participation of Vasyl Poraiko and the Hoiv Brothers in the Work of the Ukrainian Student Union Section in Sniatyn (1911–1921)]. Halychyna (in Ukrainian) (37): 140–149.
- Derevianko, S. (2020). "Порайко Василь Іванович" [Poraiko Vasyl Ivanovych]. Західно-Українська Народна Республіка 1918–1923. Енциклопедія [West Ukrainian People's Republic 1918–1923: Encyclopedia] (in Ukrainian). Vol. 3. Ivano-Frankivsk: Manuscript-Lviv. pp. 230–231.
- Lytvyn, Mykola; Naumenko, Kim (1995). Історія ЗУНР [History of the WUPR] (in Ukrainian). Lviv: Instytut ukrainoznavstva NAN Ukrainy; Olir. ISBN 5-7707-7867-9.
- Naumenko, K. Ye. (2023). "Порайко Василь Іванович" [Poraiko Vasyl Ivanovych]. Encyclopedia of Modern Ukraine (in Ukrainian). Kyiv: NASU Institute of Encyclopaedic Research.
- Shapoval, Yurii; Zolotarev, Vadim (2017). «Гильотина Украины»: нарком Всеволод Балицкий и его судьба ["The Guillotine of Ukraine": People's Commissar Vsevolod Balytsky and His Fate] (in Russian). Moscow: ROSSPEN. ISBN 978-5-8243-2190-6.
- Siredzhuk, Petro (2024). Січові Стрільці і Старшини Снятинщини і Заболотівщини. Бібліографічний довідник [Sich Riflemen and Officers of the Sniatyn and Zabolotiv Regions: Biographical Directory] (in Ukrainian). Lviv: Halych-Pres.
- Skliarenko, Ye. (2007). "Порайко Василь Іванович" [Poraiko Vasyl Ivanovych]. Реабілітовані історією. Полтавська область [Rehabilitated by History: Poltava Oblast] (in Ukrainian). Kyiv; Poltava: Oriiana. pp. 472–474.
