= Vladyslav Datsiuk =

Ukrainian jurist

- Владислав Дацюк
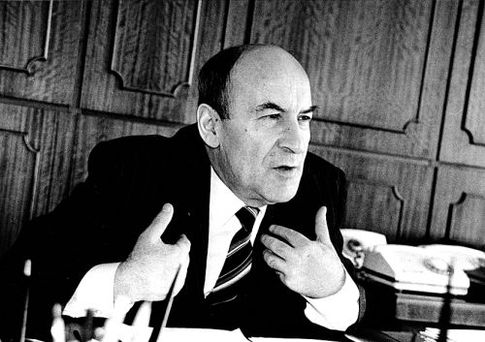

Prosecutor General of Ukraine
- In office 21 October 1993 – 19 October 1995

Personal details
- Born: Vladyslav Volodymyrovych Datsiuk; 1 January 1937 (age 89) Dobrin, Iziaslav Raion, Kamianets-Podilskyi Oblast, Ukrainian SSR, USSR
- Education: Yaroslav Mudryi National Law University
- Profession: Jurist, prosecutor Rank: State Counselor of Justice of Ukraine

Vladyslav Volodymyrovych Datsiuk (Ukrainian: Владислав Володимирович Дацюк; born 1 January 1937) was a Ukrainian lawyer and prosecutor. He served as the Prosecutor General of Ukraine from 21 October 1993 to 19 October 1995. He also held the title of State Counselor of Justice of Ukraine and was awarded the title of Honoured Lawyer of Ukraine in 2005.

== Biography ==
He graduated from the Kharkiv Law Institute in 1962.

He began his career in the prosecutor’s offices of the Zakarpattia and Khmelnytskyi regions, where he held various positions, including investigator, assistant prosecutor, and district and city prosecutor. He later served as the prosecutor of the Khmelnytskyi (1980–1987), Chernihiv (1987–1988), and Odesa (1988–1992) regions.

In 1992, he was appointed Deputy Prosecutor General of Ukraine, and from 1993 to 1995, he served as the Prosecutor General of Ukraine.

From 1995 to 1996, he served as Deputy Head of the Coordinating Committee for Combating Corruption and Organised Crime.

From 1996 to 1998, he held the position of Deputy Prosecutor of the Southern Ukrainian Transport Prosecutor's Office.
