= Petro Osypenko =

Ukrainian politician (1921-?)

- Петро Осипенко

Prosecutor of the Ukrainian SSR
- In office 1983–1990

Personal details
- Born: Petro Hryhorovych Osypenko; 14 May 1921 Dykivka, Aleksandriya uezd, Kremenchuk Governorate, Ukrainian SSR
- Died: Kyiv, Ukraine
- Education: Yaroslav Mudryi National Law University
- Profession: Jurist, prosecutor Rank: 1st class State Councillor of Justice

Petro Hryhorovych Osypenko (Ukrainian: Петро Григорович Осипенко; born 14 May 1921, Dykivka, now in Oleksandriia Raion, Kirovohrad Oblast, Ukraine; date of death unknown) was a Ukrainian Soviet politician and public prosecutor. From 1983 to 1990 he was the prosecutor of the Ukrainian Soviet Socialist Republic (a role which at that time was subordinate to the Procurator General of the Soviet Union).

== Biography ==
Petro Osypenko was born on 14 May 1921 in the village of Dykivka (now located in Oleksandriia Raion, Kirovohrad Oblast, Ukraine). He graduated from the Faculty of Physics and Mathematics at the Kirovohrad Teacher Training Institute.

In 1939, he began working as a teacher at the Nova Praha Secondary School in Kirovohrad Oblast.

From 1940 to 1945, he served in the Red Army and took part in the Second World War.

He became a member of the Communist Party of the Soviet Union in 1945.

After demobilisation and earning a law degree from the Kharkiv Law Institute, he worked in the prosecution offices of Kirovohrad and Kyiv oblasts, as well as in the Moldavian SSR.

Beginning in 1953, he served in the Prosecutor’s Office of the Ukrainian SSR, holding positions in the Investigation Department and the Criminal and Judicial Supervision Department, overseeing investigations conducted by state security agencies.

In February 1960, he was appointed Prosecutor of Kyiv Oblast. Between 1967 and 1983, he served as Deputy Prosecutor and later First Deputy Prosecutor of the Ukrainian SSR.

From January 1983 to February 1990, he held the position of Prosecutor of the Ukrainian SSR.

He was elected as a deputy of the Verkhovna Rada of the Ukrainian SSR for the 10th and 11th convocations.

He was awarded the Orders of the Red Banner of Labour and the Order of the Patriotic War, 2nd class, as well as numerous medals. He received the Certificate of Honour from the Presidium of the Verkhovna Rada of the Ukrainian SSR. He was an Honoured Lawyer of the Ukrainian SSR and an Honoured Worker of the Prosecutor's Office.
