= Olena Lukash =

Ukrainian jurist and politician

- Олена Лукаш
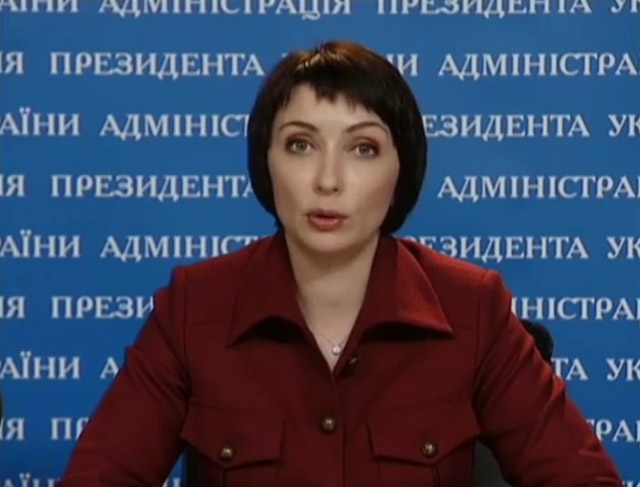
- Lukash in 2014

13th Minister of Justice of Ukraine
- In office July 4, 2013 – February 27, 2014
- Prime Minister: Mykola Azarov
- Preceded by: Oleksandr Lavrynovych
- Succeeded by: Pavlo Petrenko

Minister of Cabinet of Ministers
- In office December 24, 2012 – July 4, 2013
- Prime Minister: Mykola Azarov
- Preceded by: Anatoly Tolstouhov

People's Deputy of Ukraine
- In office May 25, 2006 – December 12, 2012

Personal details
- Born: November 12, 1976 (age 49) Rîbnița, Moldavian SSR, Soviet Union (now Moldova)
- Party: Party of Regions
- Spouse: Hryhoriy Ilyashov
- Children: 2
- Education: Academy of Labor and Social Relations
- Occupation: Politician

Olena Leonidovna Lukash (Ukrainian: Олена Леонідівна Лукаш; born 12 November 1976) is a Ukrainian former jurist, politician, former Minister of Justice of Ukraine, as well as a former member of the Party of Regions. She was a Merited Jurist of Ukraine (2010).

From February 2014, Lukash was wanted for charges of murder and mass complicity in the Revolution of Dignity when President Yanukovych fled to Russia. She is believed to have fled to Russia in the aftermath of the Revolution of Dignity. From then she was also placed on an EU sanctions list. From June 2015 Lukash was also wanted on abuse of office and fraud charges. On November 5, 2015, the Security Service of Ukraine arrested Olena Lukash upon her return to Kyiv from Russia, and a court was opened to file charges against her. However on November 10, she was released on bail of over 5 million Hryvnia after she claimed that she deliberately had gone to the Prosecutor General’s Office of Ukraine to give evidence for an investigation into the deaths of over a hundred people in the Revolution of Dignity. In 2020, it was alleged that Lukash was currently hosting a program and guest-appearing on pro-Russian channels owned by Viktor Medvedchuk, as part of a wider Russian disinformation campaign against Ukraine.

== Life and career ==
Lukash was born on November 12, 1976, in Rîbnița, Moldavian SSR, Soviet Union (now Moldova). She lived in Severodonetsk since 1977. She graduated from the Academy of Labor and Social Relations at the Trade Union Federations of Ukraine in 2000.

In 2001, she received a certificate to conduct jurist activities and in 2001–03 directed a company "Agency "In the Name of Law" (Агентство "Іменем Закону"). In 2004–05 Lukash was a senior instructor at the Ukrainian academy of foreign trade and later the Jurist Agency "Libera". In 2005 she defended several participants of the "Severodonetsk Congress".

From 2006 to 2012, she was elected to the Verkhovna Rada. During that time Lukash was a People's Deputy of Ukraine and the First Deputy Minister of the Cabinet of Ministers. In 2010–11 she was the First Deputy Chairman of Presidential Administration and represented the President of Ukraine in the Constitutional Court of Ukraine. In December 2012 Lukash was appointed the Minister of Cabinet of Ministers.

On July 2, 2013, Oleksandr Lavrynovych was elected as member of the Supreme Council of Justice of Ukraine. Lukash replaced Lavrynovych as Justice Minister 2 days later.

== Family ==
Her younger sister Tetyana, Merited Jurist of Ukraine (2010), is a member of the Central Election Commission of Ukraine.

Lukash's husband Lieutenant General Hryhoriy Ilyashov is a former director of the Foreign Intelligence Service of Ukraine. He was replaced in late June 2014.

== Sanctions ==
Listed in the List of people and organizations sanctioned during the Russo-Ukrainian War

Political offices
Preceded by Anatoliy Tolstoukhov	Minister of Cabinet of Ministers; 2012–2013	Succeeded by Vladyslav Zabarskyi (acting)
Preceded by Oleksandr Lavrynovych	Minister of Justice of Ukraine; 2013–2014	Succeeded by Pavlo Petrenko
