= Ludwig Salo =

Ukrainian educator, philologist, and public figure (1853–1915)

Liudvyh Salo
- Людвиг Ількович Сальо
- Liudvyh Salo, 1900
- Born: 5 June 1853; Kolomyia, Kingdom of Galicia and Lodomeria, Austria-Hungary
- Died: 4 May 1915 (aged 61); Lviv, Kingdom of Galicia and Lodomeria, Austria-Hungary
- Resting place: Lychakiv Cemetery, Lviv
- Occupations: Educator, classical philologist, mathematician, public figure
- Known for: Development of Ukrainian secondary education in Galicia; chairman of the Regional School Union (1912–1914)
- Awards: 1898 Jubilee Medal; Jubilee Cross

Liudvyh Ilkovych Salo (also spelled Ludwig Salo or Ludwik Salo; Ukrainian: Людвиг Ількович Сальо; 5 June 1853 – 4 May 1915) was a Ukrainian Galician educator, classical philologist, mathematician, and public figure. He taught at gymnasiums in Sanok, Lviv, and Kolomyia, authored German and Latin textbooks for Ukrainian schools, and headed several Ukrainian educational societies in Galicia.

== Biography ==
Salo was born on 5 June 1853 in Kolomyia into a Ukrainian Greek Catholic family with roots in the Sniatyn area. He completed his secondary education in Kolomyia and began working as a language teacher in 1878. He passed his qualifying examinations in German, classical languages, mathematics, and physics. In 1877, he was also commissioned as a reserve lieutenant in the Austro-Hungarian Army.

In 1887, Salo was appointed a teacher at the gymnasium in Sanok, where he taught Latin, German, and Ukrainian, and received the title of Imperial-Royal professor in 1889. From 1890 to 1892, he taught at the Academic Gymnasium of Lviv and served as deputy chairman of the Ruthenian Pedagogical Society under Oleksandr Barvinsky.

Between 1892 and 1905, Salo worked at the gymnasium in Kolomyia, where he headed the first Ukrainian-language class established in the 1892/1893 academic year and chaired the local "Shkilna Pomich" (School Aid) society. His students during this period included Vasyl Poraiko, Stepan Shukhevych, Osyp Bukshovanyi, Kost Kysilevsky, and Peter Zvarych.

In 1905, Salo returned to the Academic Gymnasium of Lviv and taught there until the outbreak of World War I. He was an active member of the Prosvita society and the Teachers' Hromada, and from 1912 to 1914 served as the last chairman of the Regional School Union alongside Mykhailo Hrushevsky, overseeing Ukrainian private secondary schools in Galicia. In May 1914, he represented Ukrainian teachers at the 7th Congress of the Imperial Association of Austrian Secondary School Societies in Kraków, where he was elected vice-president representing national minorities.

In his pedagogical writings, Salo criticized the traditional grammar-translation method of teaching German and advocated for practical conversational instruction. He died on 4 May 1915 in Lviv during the Russian occupation of the city and was buried at Lychakiv Cemetery (Field 63).

== Selected works ==
- Cornelii Nepotis liber de excellentibus ducibus exterarum gentium (edited with a dictionary for Ukrainian youth), Lviv, 1897 (2nd ed., 1907).
- "Nauka nimetskoi movy i pidruchnyky do nei: davnishi (1890–94) i teperishni (1905–1909)" [Teaching of the German Language and Its Textbooks], Nasha shkola, No. 3–4, 1909, pp. 98–112.
- "Pro vykhovane molodizhy" [On the Education of Youth], Svoboda, No. 40, 5 April 1919, p. 4.
