= Vitaliy Yarema =

Ukrainian politician

- Віталій Ярема
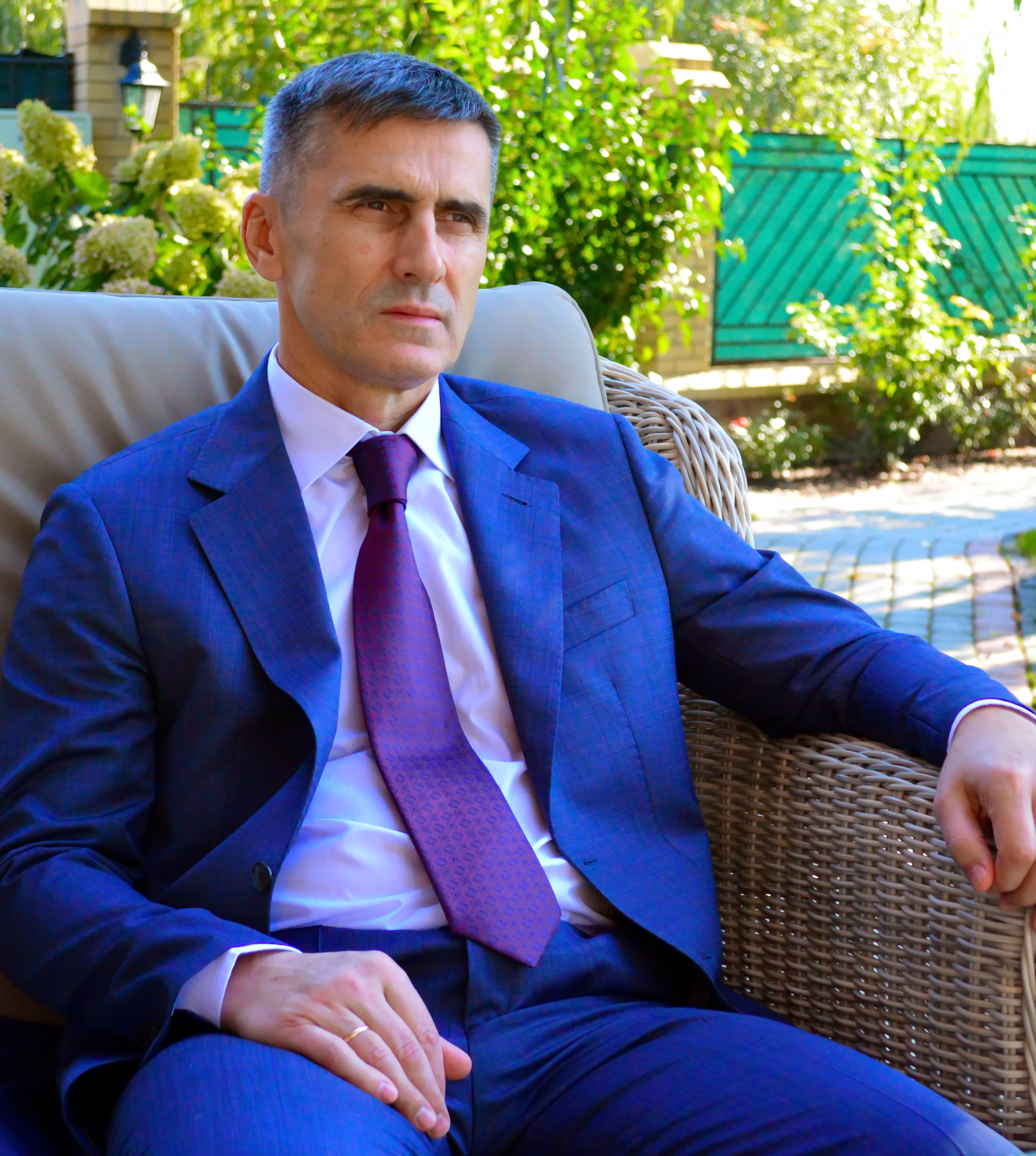
- Yarema in 2018

12th General Prosecutor of Ukraine
- In office 19 June 2014 – 10 February 2015
- President: Petro Poroshenko
- Preceded by: Oleh Makhnitskyi (acting)
- Succeeded by: Viktor Shokin

22nd First Deputy Prime Minister of Ukraine
- In office 27 February 2014 – 19 June 2014
- Prime Minister: Arseniy Yatsenyuk
- Preceded by: Serhiy Arbuzov
- Succeeded by: Stepan Kubiv

Personal details
- Born: 14 October 1963 (age 62) Strokova, Pereiaslav-Khmelnytskyi Raion, Kyiv Oblast, Ukraine SSR, Soviet Union
- Party: unaffiliated
- Education: Academy of Internal Affairs of Ukraine
- Website: Official Site

Vitaliy Hryhorovych Yarema (Ukrainian: Віталій Григорович Ярема; born 14 October 1963) is a Ukrainian politician, law enforcement expert who was General Prosecutor of Ukraine from 19 June 2014 until 10 February 2015. His previous position was First Deputy Prime Minister of Ukraine in Yatsenyuk Government since 27 February 2014, where he was responsible for law enforcement and the power block. Yarema was an MP of Batkivshchyna party (unaffiliated), a former head of the Ministry of Internal Affairs of Ukraine in Kyiv (2005–2010), and a retired lieutenant-general of police.

== General Prosecutor of Ukraine ==
On 19 June 2014 A total of 329 MPs voted Yarema in as General Prosecutor of Ukraine following the respective nomination submitted by Ukrainian President Petro Poroshenko.

== Family ==
Yarema and his wife Margarita have three children. A 25-year-old son Valery, 22-year-old daughter Ilona and 6-year-old daughter Roxolana.

== Awards ==
- In 1999 by the Decree of the President of Ukraine, he was awarded the medal "For Irreproachable Service" III.
- Honored Lawyer of Ukraine
