= Arkadiy Kiselyov =

Ukrainian politician (1880–1938)

- Аркадій Кисельов

Prosecutor General of the Ukrainian SSR
- In office 1935–1936

Personal details
- Born: Petro Hryhorovych Osypenko; 1880 Kiev, Kiev Governorate, Russian Empire (now Kyiv, Ukraine)
- Died: 22 September 1938 (aged 57–58) Kyiv, Ukrainian SSR, Soviet Union
- Party: Russian Social Democratic Labour Party; Bolsheviks; CPSU
- Profession: Politician; Laborer

Arkady Leontiiovych Kiselev (Ukrainian: Аркадій Леонтійович Кисельов; 1880 – 22 September 1938) was a politician of the Ukrainian Soviet Socialist Republic, serving as its Prosecutor General from 1935 to 1936.

== Biography ==
He was born Aaron Kesler Lazarevic into a family of workers. He graduated from a city school and received a secondary education, and then worked as a laborer. A member of the RSDLP(B) since 1902, he took part in the revolutionary movement, was arrested in 1902 and 1904, and went abroad in 1904. He then lived in the United States of America. He returned with his family to Russia in 1917 after the February Revolution, and began working as an organizer of the Red Guard within the Donbas area of Ukraine, later serving in the Red Army.

Since 1921, he has been working in the party and economic spheres in the Chelyabinsk province and the Donetsk basin. In 1929–1930, he was the head of the Stalinist District Control Commission of the CP(B)U-RSU in Donbas. Until January 1934, he was the secretary of the Party Board of the Central Control Commission of the CP(B)U. From May 26, 1934, to January 1935, he was People's Commissar of Supply of the Ukrainian SSR.

He was then People's Commissar of Justice of the Ukrainian SSR (equivalent to Minister of Justice), Prosecutor General of the Ukrainian SSR, a member of the Secretariat of the All-Ukrainian Central Executive Committee (VUTsVK), and a member of the Council of the Central Exeecutive Committee of the USSR. In September 1936, he was then elected Secretary of VUTsVK and a member of the presidium to VUTsVK. In December 1936, he was appointed as a member of the editorial commission at the cogress responsible for finalizing the 1936 Constitution of the USSR. He co-authored the 23 3June 1935 decree expanding the powers of the Supreme Court of the Ukrainian SSR, which in practice would later facilitate the judicial activity during the Great Purge.

On 15 March 1938, during the Great Purge, Kiselyov was arrested and accused of involvement in a "right-Trotskyist organization". On 22 September 1938, he was sentenced by a session of the Military Collegium of the Supreme Court of the Soviet Union, and was executed onn that same day in Kyiv. In 1956, after the revelation of the purges by Nikita Khrushchev, he was posthumously rehabilitated in 1956.
