= Grigoriy Zhelyeznogorskiy =

Ukrainian Soviet lawyer (1896–1938)

Grigoriy Abramovich Zhelyeznogorskiy (Ukrainian – Григо́рій Абра́мович Желєзного́рський; born Gersh Abramovich Eisenberg; 1896, Tarashcha, Kiev Governorate – 22 September 1938, Kiev) was a lawyer of the Ukrainian Soviet Socialist Republic, acting as its final Prosecutor General in spring 1936 before Ukraine's public prosecutor's office was subordinated to the Prosecutor General of the Soviet Union the following year.

== Sources ==
- "Желєзногорський-Айзенберг Григорій Абрамович". Archived from the original on 2010-11-02.
