= Leonid Yachenin =

Soviet politician (1897–1952)

Leonid Iwanowytsch Yachenin (Ukrainian: Леонід Іванович Яченін; 24 July (5 August) 1897, in Ihrayevo, now in Slutsk, Minsk Region, Belarus – 16 December 1952, in Rostov-on-Don) was a politician and lawyer of the Ukrainian Soviet Socialist Republic. From 1938 to 1941 he acted as its prosecutor general (the first holder of that role after it had been subordinated to that of the Prosecutor General of the Soviet Union), from 1941 to 1946 as Military Prosecutor for the Five Fronts and for the Group of Soviet Forces in Germany and from 1946 to 1952 as military prosecutor for the North Caucasus Military District.

== Sources ==
- ЯЧЕНІН
- Сторінку не знайдено
