= Viktor Shokin =

Ukrainian investigator

- Віктор Шокін
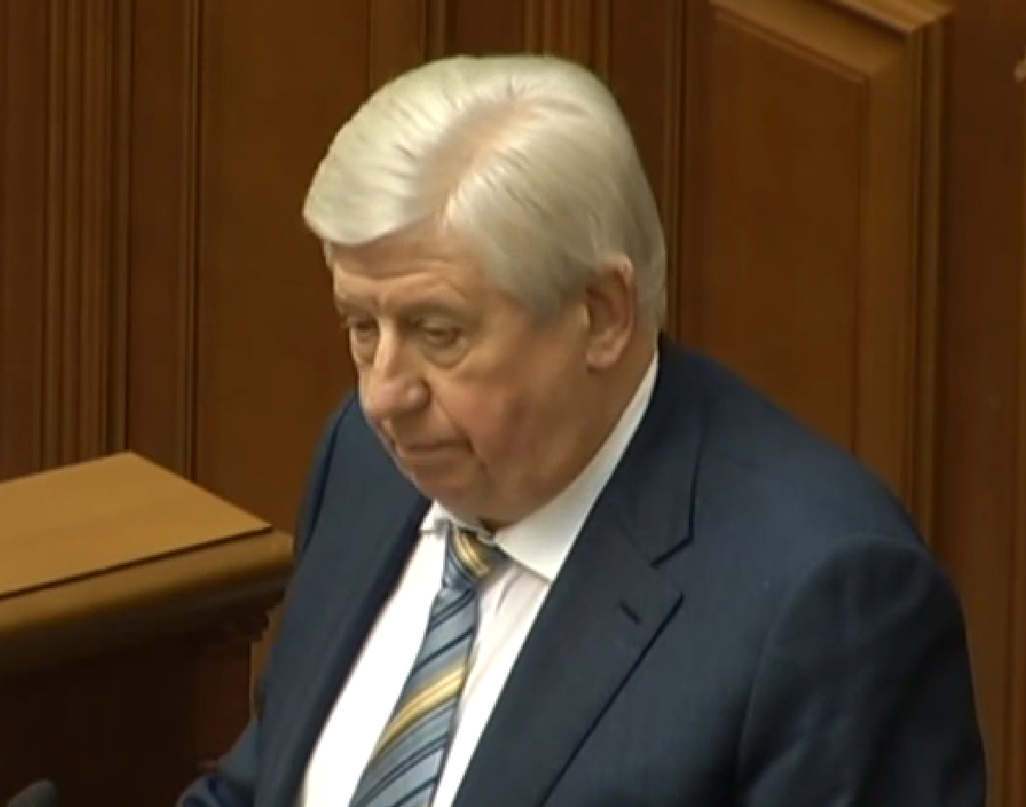
- Shokin in 2015

13th Prosecutor General of Ukraine
- In office 10 February 2015 – 29 March 2016
- President: Petro Poroshenko
- Preceded by: Vitaly Yarema
- Succeeded by: Yuriy Lutsenko

Personal details
- Born: Viktor Mykolayovych Shokin; 4 November 1952 (age 73) Kyiv, Ukrainian SSR, Soviet Union
- Party: Independent
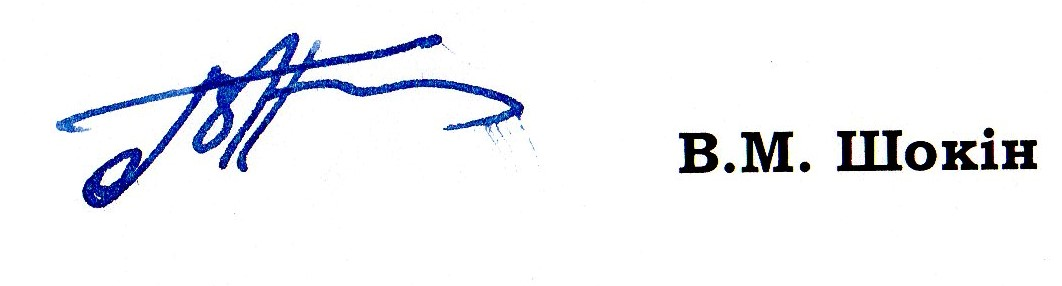
- Signature

Viktor Mykolayovych Shokin (Ukrainian: Віктор Миколайович Шокін; born 4 November 1952) is a former Prosecutor General of Ukraine. Having previously worked as an investigator for the Prosecutor General Office, he served as Prosecutor General for one year between 2015 and 2016.

Amid domestic and international pressure, he was removed from office by the Ukrainian Parliament in March 2016, a move welcomed by the European Union, the United States, the International Monetary Fund, and the World Bank.

Shokin's removal played a central role in the Biden–Ukraine conspiracy theory as it was falsely claimed that then U.S. Vice President Joe Biden extorted the Ukrainian government into firing Shokin to thwart an investigation into Burisma, a company tied to his son, Hunter Biden, but the World Bank, International Monetary fund, European diplomats, and anti-corruption advocates in Ukraine say Shokin was removed because he failed to pursue Ukrainian politicians for corruption, and that they intervened before Biden did.

== Biography ==
Shokin was born 4 November 1952 in Kyiv. After graduating from the Kharkiv Law Institute (today Yaroslav Mudryi National Law University) in 1980, Shokin worked for the Prosecutor General Office as investigator until 2001. In an interview with Ukrayinska Pravda he stated that he was forced to retire in 2001 after refusing to take on the case against Yulia Tymoshenko.

== Prosecutorial career ==
Shokin was appointed Prosecutor General of Ukraine on 10 February 2015, replacing Vitaly Yarema. He was a controversial appointee due to his perceived role in blocking prosecutions against those accused of shooting demonstrators in the 2014 Ukrainian revolution. As Prosecutor General, he was accused of blocking major cases against allies and influential figures and hindering the fight against corruption in Ukraine.

In early April 2015, Shokin stated that the General Prosecutor Ukraine (GPU) files about criminal orders from former General Prosecutor Viktor Pshonka (Note: After the fall of Viktor Yanukovych's government in February 2014, Pshonka, a Russian citizen with an arrest warrant issued for him, fled from Ukraine to Russia and was last publicly seen on 13 April 2014, at Rostov-on-Don in Russia. The Pshonka gold jewelry businesses, formerly located in Kramatorsk, Donetsk Oblast, Ukraine, moved to Sebastopol in Russian annexed Crimea in the fall 2014. Russia has illegally occupied Crimea since the Russian invasion of Ukraine in February 2014.) had disappeared, along with Pshonka's secret casework and secret materials. Shokin stated, "I will tell you more: not only criminal cases, but classified materials have disappeared - secret records, including those related to the orders of Victor Pshonka." (Russian: Виктор Шокин: "Я вам больше скажу: пропали не только уголовные дела, но секретные материалы – секретное делопроизводство. В том числе, то, что касалось распоряжений Виктора Пшонки.").

Various street protests demanding Shokin's resignation were held. On 2 November 2015, there was an assassination attempt against him when an unidentified sniper fired three shots into his office, but was foiled by the bulletproof glass window. In response to a query from Ukrainian News Agency in late 2019, the Security Service of Ukraine (SBU) acknowledged that it is continuing to investigate the attempted assassination of Shokin.

Through 2015 and early 2016, domestic and international pressure (including from the IMF, the EU, and the EBRD) built for Shokin to be removed from office. The Obama administration withheld $1 billion in loan guarantees to pressure the Ukrainian government to remove Shokin from office. (Note: In March 2016 testimony to the Senate Foreign Relations Committee, former ambassador to Ukraine John E. Herbst stated, "By late fall of 2015, the EU and the United States joined the chorus of those seeking Mr. Shokin’s removal" and that Joe Biden "spoke publicly about this before and during his December visit to Kyiv." During the same hearing, assistant secretary of state Victoria Nuland stated, "we have pegged our next $1 billion loan guarantee, first and foremost, to having a rebooting of the reform coalition so that we know who we are working with, but secondarily, to ensuring that the prosecutor general’s office gets cleaned up.") His defenders nonetheless argued that he played an important role "balancing competing political interests". His Deputy Prosecutor, Vitaly Kasko, announced his resignation on 15 February 2016 denouncing the corruption and lawlessness of the Prosecutor's office. Shokin was also criticized in Ukraine for failing to prosecute snipers who killed demonstrators during the revolution, as well as for failing to investigate corrupt businesses.

On 16 February 2016, Shokin submitted a letter of resignation, although the next day an official of the prosecution office stated, "As far as I know he has taken a paid leave". On 19 February 2016 presidential press secretary Sviatoslav Tsegolko wrote on Twitter that the presidential administration had received an official letter of resignation from Shokin.

On 16 March 2016 an official of the prosecution office stated that Shokin had resumed his work. On the same day, his office carried out a raid against one of Ukraine's leading anti-corruption groups, the Anti-Corruption Action Center (AntAC), claiming that it had misappropriated aid money. AntAC was a frequent critic of the Prosecutor General's Office under Shokin. In one notorious case, two of Shokin's prosecutors were caught with stashes of diamonds, cash and valuables in their homes, likely indicating bribery. Prosecutors from another department of Shokin's office were fired or reassigned when they attempted to bring a prosecution against the so-called "diamond prosecutors".

On 28 March, protesters called for Shokin's firing, after his office was authorized by a Kyiv court to investigate AntAC. Shokin was formally dismissed in a parliamentary vote on 29 March 2016. The European Union praised Shokin's dismissal due to a "lack of tangible results" of his office's investigations, and also because people in Shokin's office were themselves being investigated. Following his dismissal Shokin went into retirement.

On 27 February 2020, a court ruling forced investigators to open a probe on Joe Biden's pressure on Poroshenko to fire Shokin. The investigation was closed in November 2020 after the election of Joe Biden as President of the United States.

== Investigation into Burisma Holdings ==
In 2012, the Ukrainian prosecutor general Viktor Pshonka began investigating Ukrainian oligarch Mykola Zlochevsky, owner of the natural gas company Burisma Holdings, over allegations of money laundering, tax evasion, and corruption during 2010–2012.

In 2015, Shokin became the prosecutor general, inheriting the investigation. The Obama administration and other governments and non-governmental organizations soon became concerned that Shokin was not adequately pursuing corruption in Ukraine, was protecting the political elite, and was regarded as "an obstacle to anti-corruption efforts". Among other issues, he was slow-walking the investigation into Zlochevsky and Burisma and, according to Zlochevsky's allies, using the threat of prosecution to try to solicit bribes from Mr. Zlochevsky and his team – to the extent that Obama officials were considering launching their own criminal investigation into the company for possible money laundering.

While visiting Kyiv in December 2015, then-U.S. Vice President Joe Biden warned Ukrainian President Petro Poroshenko that, if he did not fire Shokin, the Obama administration was prepared to withhold $1 billion in loan guarantees. Biden later said: "I looked at them and said, 'I'm leaving in six hours. If the prosecutor is not fired, you're not getting the money.' [...] He got fired. And they put in place someone who was solid at the time." Whether or not Shokin's successor was "solid" was never confirmed. Shokin was dismissed by Parliament in late March 2016. In 2016, The New York Times published an article that suggested that "the credibility of the vice president’s anti-corruption message may have been undermined" by Hunter Biden's dealings with the company.

In May 2019, Vitaly Kasko, who had been Shokin's deputy overseeing international cooperation before resigning in February 2016, provided documents to Bloomberg News claiming that under Shokin, the investigation into Burisma had been dormant. Shokin himself claimed in May 2019 that he had been investigating Burisma Holdings. This claim was supported by testimony Shokin provided on September 4, 2019, for an Austrian court. Testifying in support of his prior claims of investigating Burisma Holdings, Shokin, in a sworn affidavit dated September 4, 2019 for a court in Austria, stated that "The truth is that I was forced out because I was leading a wide-ranging corruption probe into Burisma Holdings, a natural gas firm active in Ukraine and Joe Biden’s son, Hunter Biden, was a member of the Board of Directors." Shokin continued, stating that, "On several occasions President Poroshenko asked me to have a look at the criminal case against Burisma and consider the possibility of winding down the investigative actions in respect of this company, but I refused to close this investigation."

The investigation into Burisma only pertained to events happening before Joe Biden's son, Hunter Biden, joined the board of directors of Burisma Holdings in 2014. US President Donald Trump's subsequent bid to pressure Ukrainian President Volodymyr Zelensky to announce an investigation of Joe Biden in relation to Burisma led to the December 2019 impeachment of Trump. On February 27, 2020, at Shokin's request, a Ukrainian court ruling opened a probe on Joe Biden's pressure on Poroshenko to fire Shokin (a routine action in Ukraine, where any individual can go to court to request prosecution if the State Investigative Bureau refuses). The investigation was closed due to lack of evidence in November 2020. A statement from the National Police that said it found "no evidence of wrongdoing": "After interrogation, we found out that in 2016 Shokin resigned from his post voluntarily", and "During the investigation we did not find any confirmation anyone pressured him to resign."

== Parliamentary investigations and removal from office ==
In July 2015, shortly after his appointment, reformist minority member Yehor Soboliev advanced a motion to dismiss Shokin for corruption, gaining 127 of the required 150 signatures including several members of the ruling parties. Representatives of the EU and the United States pressed Poroshenko for his removal, as did the World Bank and International Monetary Fund.

In March 2016 the Ukrainian Parliament voted overwhelmingly to remove Shokin, a decision which was welcomed by the EU.

== Family ==
- Daughter — Tatiana Gornostaeva — Deputy prosecutor of the Odesa Oblast.
- Son-in-law — Alexey Gornostaev — Deputy Prosecutor of the Kyivskyi District of Odesa.
- Matchmaker — Nikolay Gornostaev — Deputy Prosecutor of the Dnipropetrovsk Oblast.

== See also ==
- Conspiracy theories related to the Trump–Ukraine scandal
- Biden–Ukraine conspiracy theory
- Trump–Ukraine scandal
