= Denys Panasyuk =

Ukrainian Soviet lawyer and politician (1900–1984)

Denys Kharytonovych Panasyuk (Ukrainian: Денис Харитонович Панасюк; 18 May 1900, Hanschyna – 8 June 1984, Kyiv) was a Ukrainian Soviet lawyer and politician. He was a deputy of the 35th convocation of the Supreme Soviet of the Soviet Union and a member of the Central Committee of the Communist Party from 1954 to 1966. From 1947 to 1953 he was Minister of Justice for the Ukrainian Soviet Socialist Republic and from August 1953 to February 1963 its prosecutor general (at that time subordinate to the Procurator General of the Soviet Union).
