= Mikhail Mikhailik =

Politician and lawyer of the Ukrainian SSR

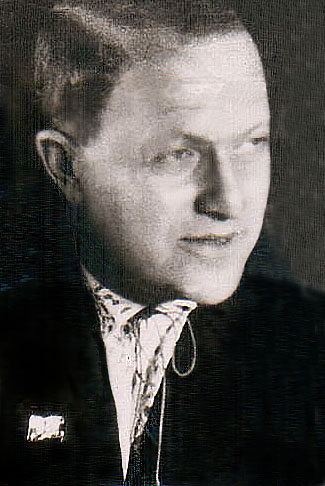
Photo footage of Mykhailyk during the "SVU process"

Mykhailo Mykhailyk (Ukrainian: Михайло Васильович Михайлик; 7 (19) October 1889 – 10 March 1937 in Kiev) was a politician and lawyer of the Ukrainian Soviet Socialist Republic.

He was born in Aleksandrovka, Slavyanoserbsk County, Yekaterinoslav Governorate (now Oleksandrivsk, Luhansk Oblast) as Yosyp Abramovych in to a Jewish family. In 1909 Yosyp turned to Orthodox Christianity and was baptised in the Russian Orthodox Church as Mykhailo. His patronymic and surname he took from personal name and surname of his godfather. Before his religious conversion, in 1905–1908 Mykhailyk was a Russian Menshevik.

In 1916 Mykhailyk graduated the Jurist faculty (predecessor of the Kharkiv Law Institute) of the Kharkiv University. After school in 1916–1917 he served in the Russian Imperial Army.

In 1918 Mykhailyk worked in the Ministry of Land Melioration of the Ukrainian State. During that time he was a member of the left-wing Ukrainian Party of Socialist Revolutionaries (before adaptation of Communist-Borotbists).

Soon after the second occupation of Kyiv by the Soviet troops following the Battle of Kiev, in April 1919 Mykhailyk joined Bolsheviks and the Kiev Revolutionary Committee. In 1919-1920 Mykhailyk was a member of orgburo and committee of the Communist Party of Eastern Galicia and Bucovina and later the Galician org committee of the Central Committee of the Communist Party (Bolsheviks) of Ukraine. In 1920 he was a deputy politruk of Galician forces and an assistant commander of the Galician Red Army forces.

From 1933 to 1935 he was its Prosecutor General. He was tried by a court chaired by Vasiliy Ulrikh and shot in 1937, but he was rehabilitated in September 1956.
