= Lipchanka =

Lipchanka Липчанка
- Selo
- Location within Voronezh Oblast Location within Russia
- Coordinates: 49°46′N 40°27′E
- Country: Russia
- Region: Voronezh Oblast
- District: Bogucharsky District
- Time zone: UTC+3:00

Lipchanka (Russian: Липчанка) is a rural locality (a khutor) and the administrative center of Lipchanskoye Rural Settlement, Bogucharsky District, Voronezh Oblast, Russia. In the 19th century the village was part of Krasnozhenovskaya volost, Bogucharsky Uyezd, Voronezh Governorate. The population was 809 as of 2010. There are 6 streets.

== Geography ==
Lipchanka is located on the Levaya Bogucharka River, 23 km southwest of Boguchar (the district's administrative centre) by road. Radchenskoye is the nearest rural locality.
