= Vasiliy Polyakov =

Soviet Russian politician

Vasily Vasilyevich Polyakov (Russian: Васи́лий Васи́льевич Поляко́в; 1893, Lyudinovo - 18 November 1937, Kiev) was a Soviet Russian politician.

== Life ==
He began his career in the factories of St Petersburg, before working in Kharkov. He took part in the labour movement and became a member of the RSDLP in 1909, repeatedly being arrested and tried by the Tsarist authorities. After the February Revolution of 1917 he worked for the party in the provinces of Bryansk and Kharkov. In Ukraine he appeared during the Ukrainian–Soviet War.

In October 1922 he became a member of the "Pivdenmashtrestu" government in Kharkov and a member of the Organizing Bureau of the Central Committee of the Communist Party of Ukraine. In September 1930 he was appointed People's Commissar of Justice and Attorney General of the USSR and Prosecutor General of the Ukrainian SSR. From June 1933 to 28 July 1935 he was People's Commissar of Utilities of the Ukrainian SSR and from 4 August 1935 to September 1937 the Permanent Representative of the RNA in the Communist Party of Ukraine. He was arrested and shot by the NKVD in September 1937, but was rehabilitated in 1956.

== Sources ==
- "04749". knowbysight.info.
