= Prosecutor General of Ukraine =

Prosecutorial head of Ukrainian legal system

- Генеральний прокурор України
- Emblem of the Office of the Prosecutor General

- Flag of the Office of the Prosecutor General
- Incumbent; Vacant since 15 September 2026
- Type: Prosecution
- Seat: 13/15, Riznytska st, Kyiv
- Appointer: President of Ukraine; with parliamentary consent
- Term length: Six years
- Constituting instrument: Constitution of Ukraine (Article 122)
- Formation: 18 January 1918; (originally); 5 November 1991; (post-declaration)
- Website: gp.gov.ua

The Prosecutor General of Ukraine (Ukrainian: Генеральний прокурор України, romanized: Heneralnyi prokuror Ukrainy, IPA: [ɦeneˈrɑlʲnɪj prokʊˈrɔr ʊkrɐˈjinɪ]) heads the system of official prosecution in courts known as the Office of the Prosecutor General (Ukrainian: Офіс Генерального прокурора, romanized: Ofis Heneralnogo prokurora, or, before 2020, Генеральна прокуратура, Heneralna prokuratura). The prosecutor general is appointed and dismissed by the president with consent of the Verkhovna Rada (Ukrainian parliament). The prosecutor serves a term of office of six years and may be forced to resign by a vote of no confidence in parliament.

The Prosecutor General's Office dates to 1917, established by the fledgling Ukrainian governments following the collapse of the Russian Empire, when the minister of justice held the office of prosecutor general. In 1922, it was reorganized under socialist law after the Ukrainian Soviet Socialist Republic became a founding member of the Soviet Union. With adoption of the 1936 Constitution of the Soviet Union, the office became directly subordinated to the Prosecutor General Office of the Soviet Union; this lowered the status of the office, with the prosecutor appointed by the Soviet Prosecutor General and having no government post in the Ukraine SSR. Following the dissolution of the Soviet Union in 1991, the Prosecutor General Office of Ukraine became an independent agency. The office is directly proscribed in the 1996 Constitution of Ukraine.

== Duties and powers ==
The prosecutor general is appointed to office by the president of Ukraine with the consent of the Verkhovna Rada (parliament). The prosecutor is dismissed from office after serving a six-year term, or on order of the president, or the prosecutor may be forced to resign following a vote of no confidence in the Verkhovna Rada.

The powers of the office (from January 2017) are to:

- provide organization and leadership of pre-trial investigations;
- support public prosecution in the courts; and
- represent the state's interest in the courts, according to the law.

The prosecutor general submits an annual report to the Verkhovna Rada about the legal situation in the country.

The prosecutor general creates a collegiate council consisting of the prosecutor general, their first and other deputies, the prosecutor of the Autonomous Republic of Crimea, (Note: Since the annexation of Crimea by the Russian Federation, the status of the Crimea and of the city of Sevastopol is under dispute between Russia and Ukraine; Ukraine and the majority of the international community considers the Crimea and Sevastopol an integral part of Ukraine, while Russia, on the other hand, considers the Crimea and Sevastopol an integral part of Russia, with Sevastopol functioning as a federal city within the Crimean Federal District.) and other leaders of prosecution agencies.

The prosecutor general office's General Inspectorate is an independent agency established to oversee the actions of the prosecutorial system. Its goals are to modernize the Soviet-era bureaucracy, to enhance inter-agency efficiency and international cooperation, and to fight corruption.

== Structure ==
As of 21 December 2019

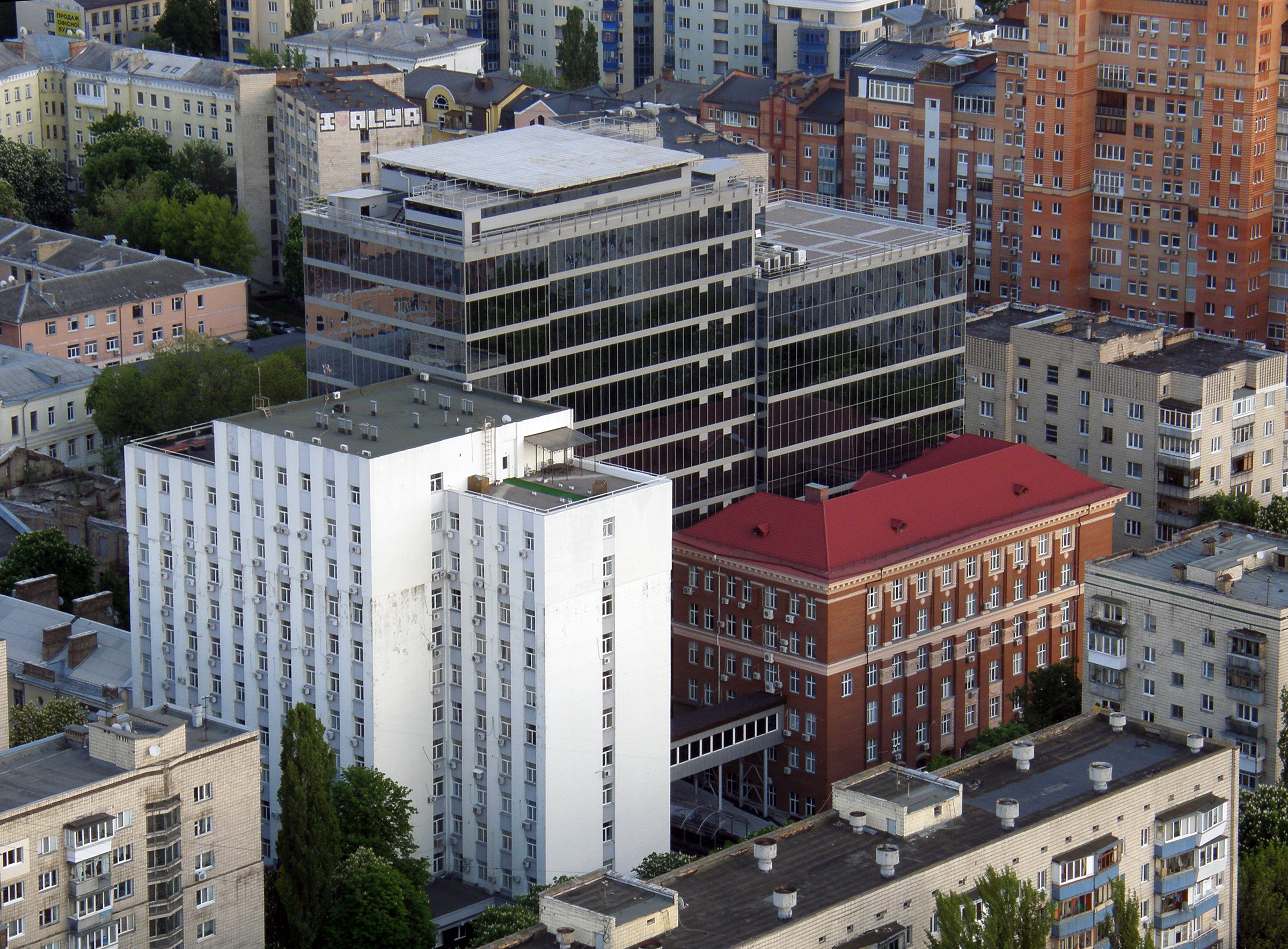
Office of the Prosecutor General of Ukraine, Kyiv

- Prosecutor's Office of the Autonomous Republic of Crimea
- Prosecutor's Office of Cherkasy Oblast
- Prosecutor's Office of Chernihiv Oblast
- Prosecutor's Office of Chernivtsi Oblast
- Prosecutor's Office of Dnipropetrovsk Oblast
- Prosecutor's Office of Donetsk Oblast
- Prosecutor's Office of Ivano-Frankivsk Oblast
- Prosecutor's Office of Kharkiv Oblast
- Prosecutor's Office of Kherson Oblast
- Prosecutor's Office of Khmelnytskyi Oblast
- Prosecutor's Office of Kirovohrad Oblast
- Prosecutor's Office of Kyiv City
- Prosecutor's Office of Kyiv Oblast
- Prosecutor's Office of Luhansk Oblast
- Prosecutor's Office of Lviv Oblast
- Prosecutor's Office of Mykolaiv Oblast
- Prosecutor's Office of Odesa Oblast
- Prosecutor's Office of Poltava Oblast
- Prosecutor's Office of Rivne Oblast
- Prosecutor's Office of Sumy Oblast
- Prosecutor's Office of Ternopil Oblast
- Prosecutor's Office of Vinnytsia Oblast
- Prosecutor's Office of Volyn Oblast
- Prosecutor's Office of Zakarpattia Oblast
- Prosecutor's Office of Zaporizhia Oblast
- Prosecutor's Office of Zhytomyr Oblast
- Military Prosecutor's Office of Joint Forces
- Military Prosecutor's Office of Ukrainian Central Region
- Military Prosecutor's Office of Ukrainian Southern Region
- Military Prosecutor's Office of Ukrainian Western Region
- National Academy of Prosecution of Ukraine

=== Separate organizations ===
- Specialized Anti-Corruption Prosecutor's Office
- Military Prosecutor
- General Inspectorate
- Primary Trade Union Organization of the Prosecutor General Office of Ukraine employees

=== Leadership ===
- Prosecutor General – Iryna Venediktova (17 March 2020)
- Deputy Prosecutor General – Viktor Trepak (8 October 2019)
- Deputy Prosecutor General – Günduz Mamedov (18 October 2019)
- Deputy Prosecutor General—Director of Specialized Anti-Corruption Prosecutor's Office – Nazar Kholodnytskyi (30 November 2015)

== History ==
=== Early period ===
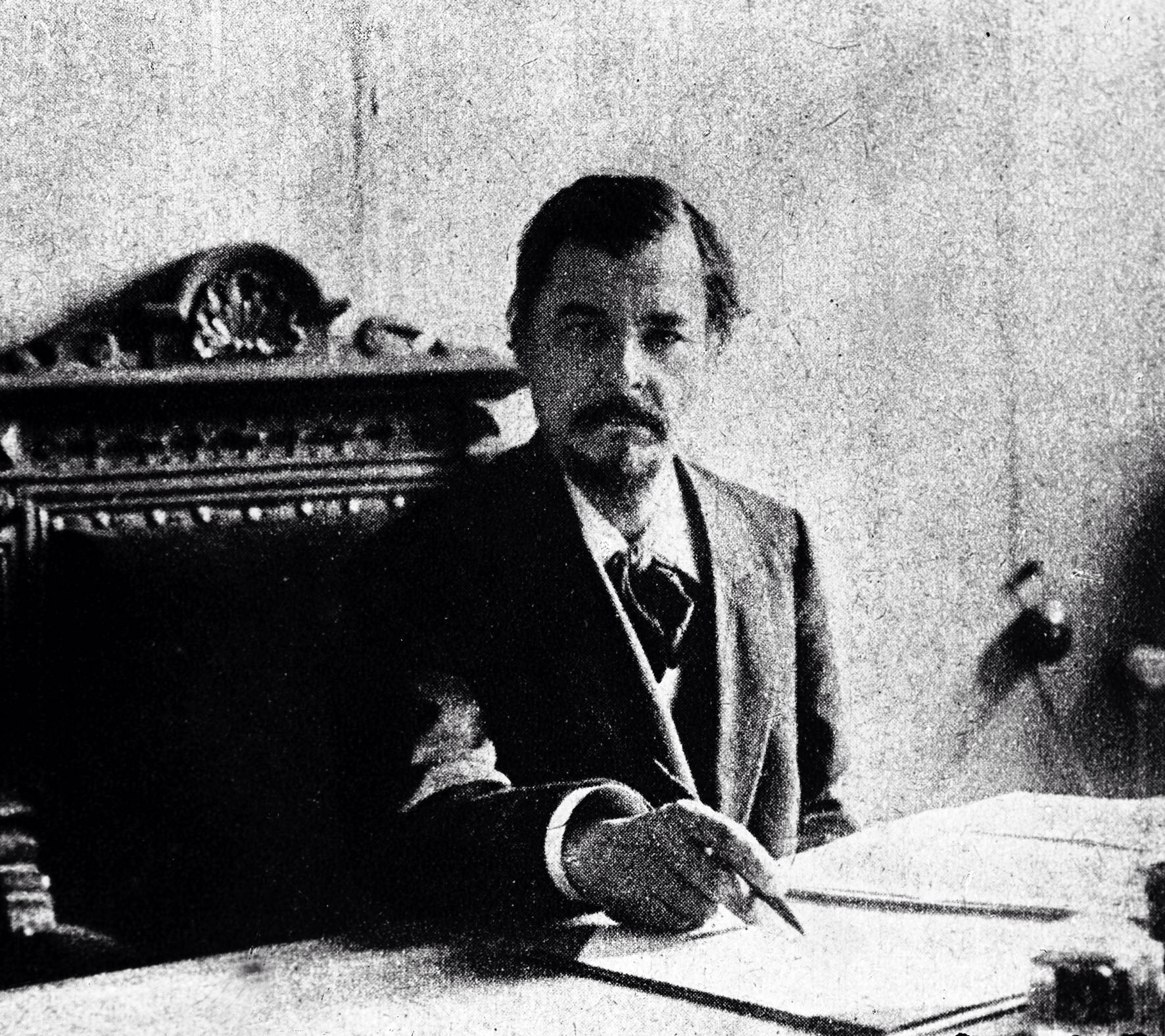
Serhiy Shelukhin, the first Prosecutor General

The post of Prosecutor General of Ukraine was first established in 1917, following the dissolution of the Russian Empire. When the Ukrainian People's Republic was formed – after Ukraine declared its independence from the Russian Republic due to the Bolshevik's aggression – the post was held by the minister of justice.

No.	Term	Name
1	1917–1918	Dmytro Markovych
2		Serhiy Shelukhin
3		Mykhailo Chubynskyi
4		Oleksiy Romanov
5		Andriy Viazlov
6		Viktor Reinbot

=== Soviet period ===
After the occupation of Ukraine by Bolsheviks in June 1922, the Prosecutor's Office of the Ukrainian SSR was established. The prosecutor general was appointed by the Ukrainian government and remained merged with the minister of justice until the 1936 Constitution of the Soviet Union came into force, at which point the republican prosecution office of Ukraine was subordinated to the prosecutor general of the USSR.

No.	Term	Name	Official title
1	1922–1927	Mykola Skrypnyk	Prosecutor General
2	1927–1930	Vasyl Poraiko	Prosecutor General
3	1930–1933	Vasiliy Polyakov	Prosecutor General
4	1933–1935	Mikhail Mikhailik	Prosecutor General
5	1935–1936	Arkadiy Kiselyov	Prosecutor General
6	1936–1937	Grigoriy Zhelyeznogorskiy	Prosecutor General
7	1938–1944	Leonid Yachenin	Prosecutor of the Ukrainian SSR
8	1944–1953	Roman Rudenko	Prosecutor of the Ukrainian SSR
9	1953–1963	Denys Panasyuk	Prosecutor of the Ukrainian SSR
10	1963–1983	Fedir Hlukh	Prosecutor of the Ukrainian SSR
11	1983–1990	Petro Osypenko	Prosecutor of the Ukrainian SSR
12	1990–1991	Mykhailo Potebenko	Prosecutor of the Ukrainian SSR

=== Post-Soviet period ===
Following Ukrainian independence in 1991, the prosecutor general wielded considerable power as a legacy of the Soviet Union state prosecutor's office. Many of the office's functions were expanded in 1991, but in 2016 the powers of the office were decreased and limited.

Prior to January 2017, the term of authority of the prosecutor was five years. Since January 2017 this was increased to six years. This list below shows prosecutors of independent Ukraine. In the absence of the prosecutor general, the office is headed by their first deputy as the acting prosecutor general.

No.	Prosecutor General of Ukraine	Name
1	4 Sep 1991 – 21 Oct 1993	Viktor Shyshkin
2	21 Oct 1993 – 19 Oct 1995	Vladyslav Datsiuk
3	19 Oct 1995 – 22 Jul 1997	Hryhoriy Vorsinov
act	22 Jul 1997 – 24 Apr 1998	Oleh Lytvak
act	24 Apr – 17 Jul 1998	Bohdan Ferents
4	17 Jul 1998 – 30 May 2002	Mykhailo Potebenko
	30 May 30 – 6 Jul 2002	unknown
5	6 Jul 2002 – 29 Oct 2003	Sviatoslav Piskun
	29 Oct – 8 Nov 2003	unknown
6	8 Nov 2003 – 9 Dec 2004	Hennadiy Vasylyev
7	10 Dec 2004 – 14 Oct 2005	Sviatoslav Piskun
	14 Oct – 4 Nov 2005	unknown
8	4 Nov 2005 – 26 Apr 2007	Oleksandr Medvedko
9	26 Apr – 24 May 2007	Sviatoslav Piskun
act	24 May – 1 Jun 2007	Viktor Shemchuk
10	1 Jun 2007 – 3 Nov 2010	Oleksandr Medvedko
11	4 Nov 2010 – 22 Feb 2014	Viktor Pshonka
comm	22–24 Feb 2014	Oleh Makhnitskyi
act	24 Feb – 18 Jun 2014	Oleh Makhnitskyi^{(1)}
12	19 Jun 2014 – 11 Feb 2015	Vitaliy Yarema
13	11 Feb 2015 – 29 Mar 2016^{(2)}	Viktor Shokin
act	29 Mar^{(3)} – 12 May 2016	Yuriy Sevruk
14	12 May 2016 – 29 Aug 2019	Yuriy Lutsenko
15	29 Aug 2019 – 5 Mar 2020	Ruslan Riaboshapka
act	6–17 Mar 2020	Viktor Chumak
16	17 Mar 2020 – 17 Jul 2022	Iryna Venediktova
act	17–27 Jul 2022	Oleksiy Symonenko
17	27 Jul 2022 - 31 October 2024	Andriy Kostin
act	31 October 2024 – 17 June 2025	Oleksiy Khomenko
18	17 June 2025 – 15 September 2026	Ruslan Kravchenko

Legend:
- act – acting
- comm – parliamentary commissioner

Notes:

- ^1 Makhnitskyi served as acting prosecutor by being appointed by the acting president of Ukraine. Makhnitskyi is also the only head of the office in the post-Soviet Ukraine who served as a parliamentary commissioner.
- ^2 Shokin was set to be formally dismissed since 16 February 2016 after submitting a letter of resignation and taking a vacation. On 16 March Shokin returned to his duties as if he never submitted any letters of resignation. He was formally dismissed in a parliamentary vote on 29 March 2016.
- ^3 Yuriy Sevruk served as acting prosecutor, being the first deputy general prosecutor until the official appointment of a new Prosecutor General.

== See also ==
- Judicial system of Ukraine
- Ministry of Justice (Ukraine)
