= Honoured Lawyer of Ukraine =

Honored Lawyer of Ukraine
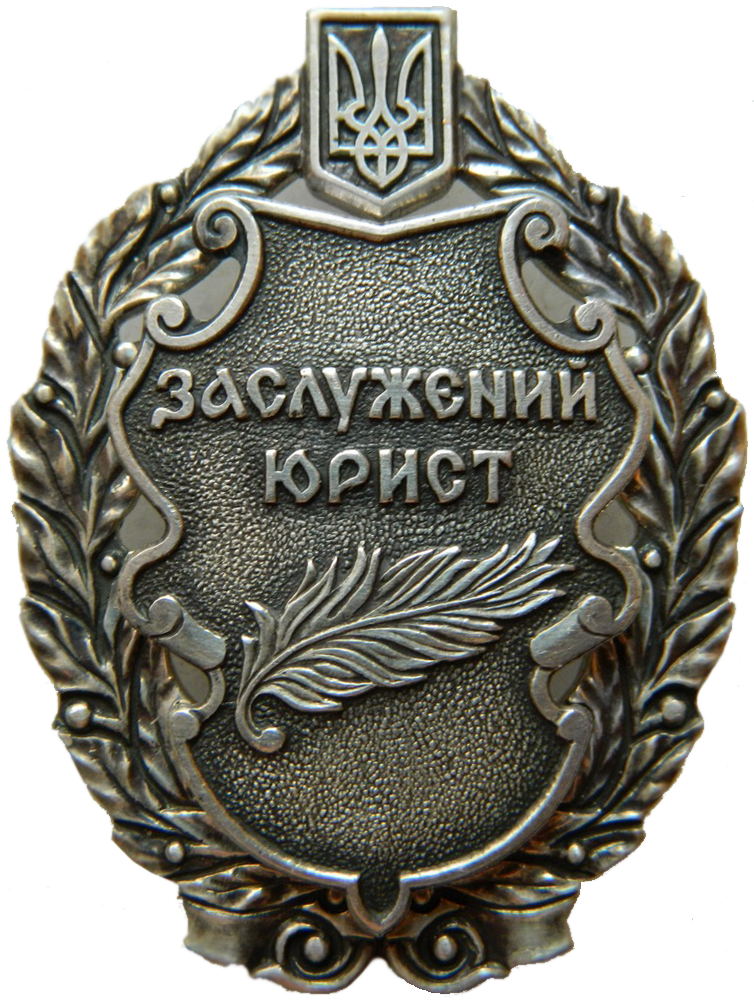
- Type: Honorary title
- Country: Ukrainian SSR; Ukraine
- Status: Currently awarded
- Established: 18 January 1966

Honored Lawyer of Ukraine (Ukrainian: Заслужений юрист України) is a state award of Ukraine which is awarded by the President of Ukraine in accordance with the Law of Ukraine "On State Awards of Ukraine". Persons nominated for the honorary title "Honored Lawyer of Ukraine" must have higher education at the specialist or master's level.

== History ==
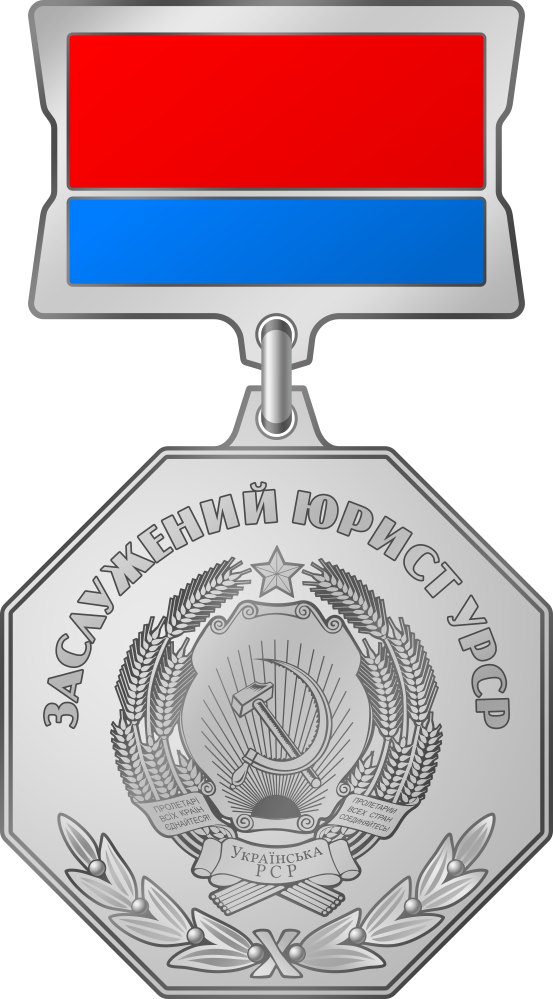
Badge "Honored Lawyer of the Ukrainian SSR"

During the existence of the Ukrainian SSR, the honorary title was called "Honored Lawyer of the Ukrainian SSR" . It was established by the Decree of the Presidium of the Supreme Soviet of the Ukrainian SSR of January 18, 1966 and, in accordance with the Regulation on the procedure for awarding the honorary title of Honored Lawyer of the Ukrainian SSR, it was awarded for special merits to highly qualified lawyers with higher education who had worked in their specialty for at least 10 years in the courts, prosecutor's offices, state security, public order protection, arbitration, and the legal profession.

By decree of the Presidium of the Supreme Soviet of the Ukrainian SSR on May 7, 1981, it approved the Regulations on State Awards of the Ukrainian SSR. According to these Regulations, the honorary title “Honored Lawyer of the Ukrainian SSR” was awarded by Decree of the Presidium of the Supreme Soviet of the Ukrainian SSR. The honorary title was awarded to lawyers with higher specialized education who worked for at least 10 years in courts, prosecutor's offices, justice, state security, internal affairs, arbitration, the bar, at enterprises, institutions and organizations, for special merits in strengthening the rule of law and order, for high professional skills and active participation in public life. Those awarded the honorary title "Honored Lawyer of the Ukrainian SSR" were awarded a certificate of the honorary title, a diploma, and a lapel badge.

The updated title "Honored Lawyer of Ukraine" has been awarded since the Declaration of Independence of Ukraine.

== Recipients ==
- Recipients of the title of Honoured Lawyer of Ukraine
