= Hromadska Dumka =

- Type: Daily newspaper
- Owner: Yevhen Chykalenko
- Editor: Volodymyr Leontovych; Fedir Matushevskyi
- Founded: December 31, 1905
- Ceased publication: August 18, 1906
- Political alignment: Ukrainian Democratic Radical Party
- Language: Ukrainian
- Headquarters: Kyiv
- Sister newspapers: Rada

Hromadska Dumka (Ukrainian: Громадська думка, translated as "Civic Thought"/"Civic Opinion") was a Ukrainian daily newspaper published between December 1905 and August 1906 in Kyiv. It was the first Ukrainian-language daily newspaper in Dnieper Ukraine.

== History ==
The establishment of Hromadska Dumka was the result of a new stage in the development of the Ukrainian national movement in Dnieper Ukraine, which started in the late 19th century. During the early 1900s, Ukrainian activists saw necessity in creating a printed organ which would popularize their ideas in the society. In 1903 Yevhen Chykalenko issued a petition to Russian authorities, asking for permission to publish a Ukrainian weekly newspaper for peasants. In 1904 a similar petition was sent to Saint Petersburg by Serhiy Yefremov, but both appeals were declined by the government due to the provisions of Ems Decree, which outlawed Ukrainian printing.

Following the proclamation of October Manifesto by Nicholas II of Russia, in October 1905 Chykalenko sent two new appeals to local and central authorities, and on 10 December Kyiv Censorship Committee gave him a permission to advertise a planned Ukrainian-language newspaper. However, the local governor once again refused to permit the publication, explaining that decision with the fact, that its content violated the law of the Russian Empire. As subscription for the newspaper had already started, two new applications were sent to authorities by Volodymyr Leontovych and Borys Hrinchenko, asking for permission to establish printed publications supporting moderate political programs. Finally, on 19 December Leontovych's appeal was confirmed, permitting the Ukrainian community to publish its own newspaper and magazine.

The first issue of Hromadska Dumka saw the light on 31 December 1905. Despite being permitted by the government, the newspaper encountered serious pressure from censorship organs, and also suffered from accusations of "Mazepinism" and "separatism" by Black Hundred circles. As a result of the latter claims, the office of the publication was searched by the police. The first and 147th issues of the newspaper were confiscated by the authorities, and between 25 January and 3 February 1906 it had to cease publication. On 18 August the newspaper was closed down altogether after its editorial office had been destroyed by the gendarmerie. Following the closure, Chykalenko, Yefremov and Hrinchenko applied for permission to establish a new press organ, and founded the newspaper Rada, which continued Hromadska Dumka's legacy.
