= Rada (newspaper) =

Ukrainian daily newspaper

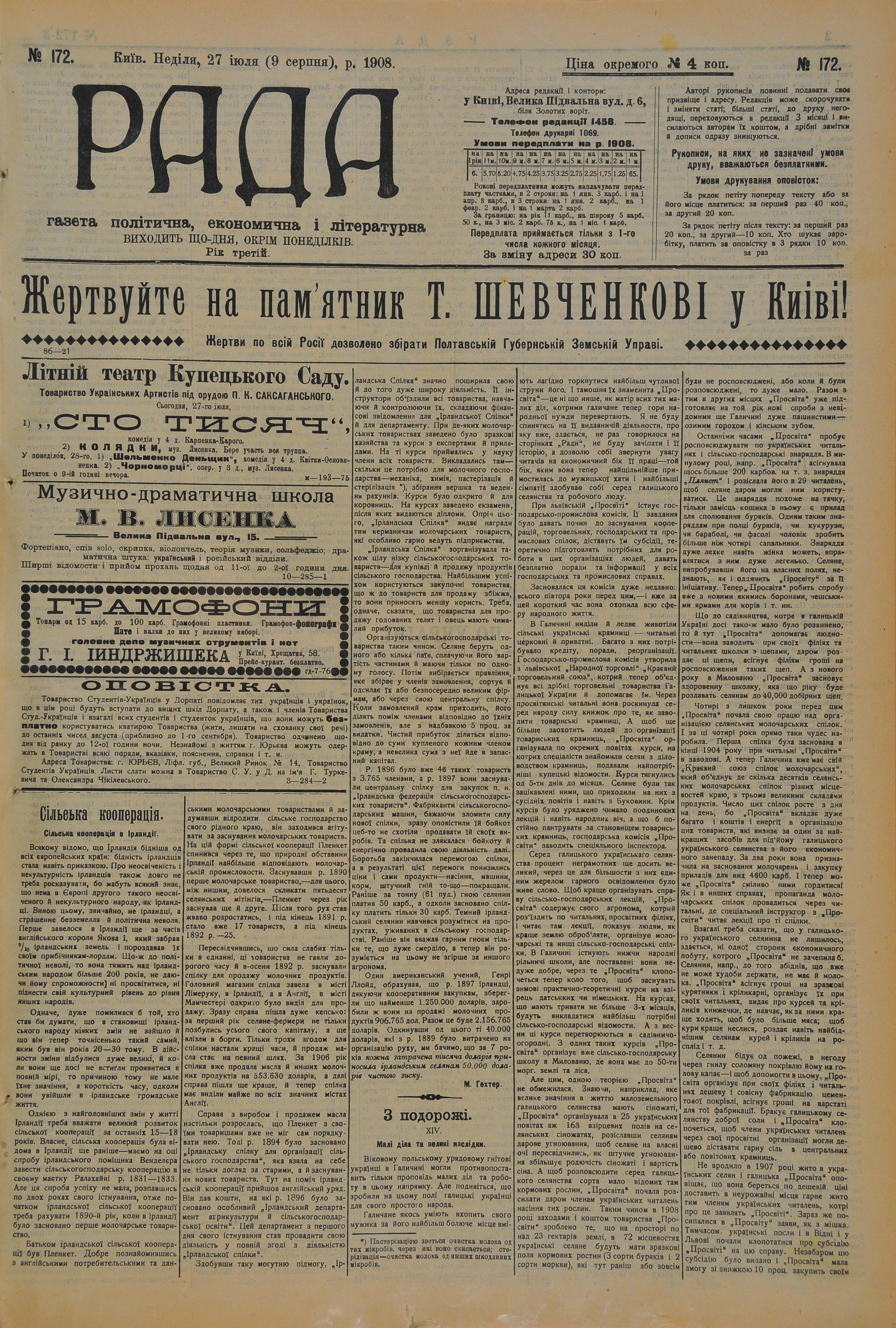
- An issue of Rada from 1908
- Type: Daily newspaper
- Owner: Yevhen Chykalenko
- Editor: Fedir Matushevskyi; Mefodiy Pavlovskyi; Andriy Nikovskyi
- Founded: September 15, 1906
- Ceased publication: August 2, 1914
- Political alignment: Society of Ukrainian Progressivists
- Language: Ukrainian
- Headquarters: Velyka Pidvalna Street 6, Kyiv
- Circulation: 1,500–4,500

Rada (Ukrainian: Рада) was a Ukrainian daily newspaper published in Kyiv between 1906 and 1914. Established as a replacement for the newspaper Hromadska Dumka, which had been banned by tsarist authorities, it was financed from personal incomes of its publisher Yevhen Chykalenko and also enjoyed the support of several philanthropists. Rada was the only Ukrainian-language publication of that type in Ukrainian lands ruled by the Russian Empire.

== History ==
Rada started publishing on 15 September 1906. While not formally adopting a distinct political position, it was connected with the Society of Ukrainian Progressivists, of which Chykalenko and several members of the newspaper's editorial office were members. Rada organized a number of local branches and worked to inform the public on political and cultural life and events in various parts of Ukrainian lands, contributing to the development of Ukrainian national consciousness during the pre-WW1 era. In particular, it publicized the achevements of the Ukrainian movement in Galicia to the public of Dnieper Ukraine, and its issues also contained information on Ukrainian life in Kholmshchyna, Bukovina and in the diaspora.

Its national orientation distinguished Rada from other Kyiv periodicals. The newspaper also contributed to the development of Ukrianian literary criticism by publishing materials dedicated to lives of notable authors such as Taras Shevchenko, Ivan Karpenko-Karyi, Pavlo Hrabovskyi, Marko Vovchok, Volodymyr Antonovych and others. Its articles popularized the cause of memorializing prominent Ukrainians, lobbying the erection of monuments to Taras Shevchenko, Hryhoriy Kvitka-Osnovianenko and Hryhoriy Skovoroda. Despite government censorship, Rada's authors voiced their opposition to Great Russian chauvinism, centralism and imperial policies. The newspaper cooperated with notable Ukrainian political activists and authors, including Mykhailo Hrushevskyi, Ivan Franko, Mykola Voronyi, Oleksandr Oles, Volodymyr Vynnychenko and others. Many of its contributors would later take part in the establishment of the Ukrainian People's Republic.

Playing a major role in the life of Ukrainian community, Rada was subjected to pressure by Russian authorities, whose representatives frequently confiscated its issues and imposed fines on its editors. Several of the newspaper's authors and editors were put under arrest, and its subscribers risked losing their jobs due to sanctions by the administration. As a result, the newspaper's circulation never exceeded 4,500 issues, forcing Chykalenko to finance it with incomes from his own farm; in years of bad harvest, he was forced to appeal for financial help from philanthropist Vasyl Symyrenko, and received support from other notable members of the Ukrainian community in the Russian Empire, such as Petro Stebnytskyi and Mykola Arkas. Despite preserving loyalty to the government, following the entry of the Russian Empire into World War I, on 2 August 1914 Rada was closed down by Russian authorities. After the February Revolution of 1917 the newspaper was revived in a new form under the name Nova Rada ("New Rada").

== Editorial staff and structure ==
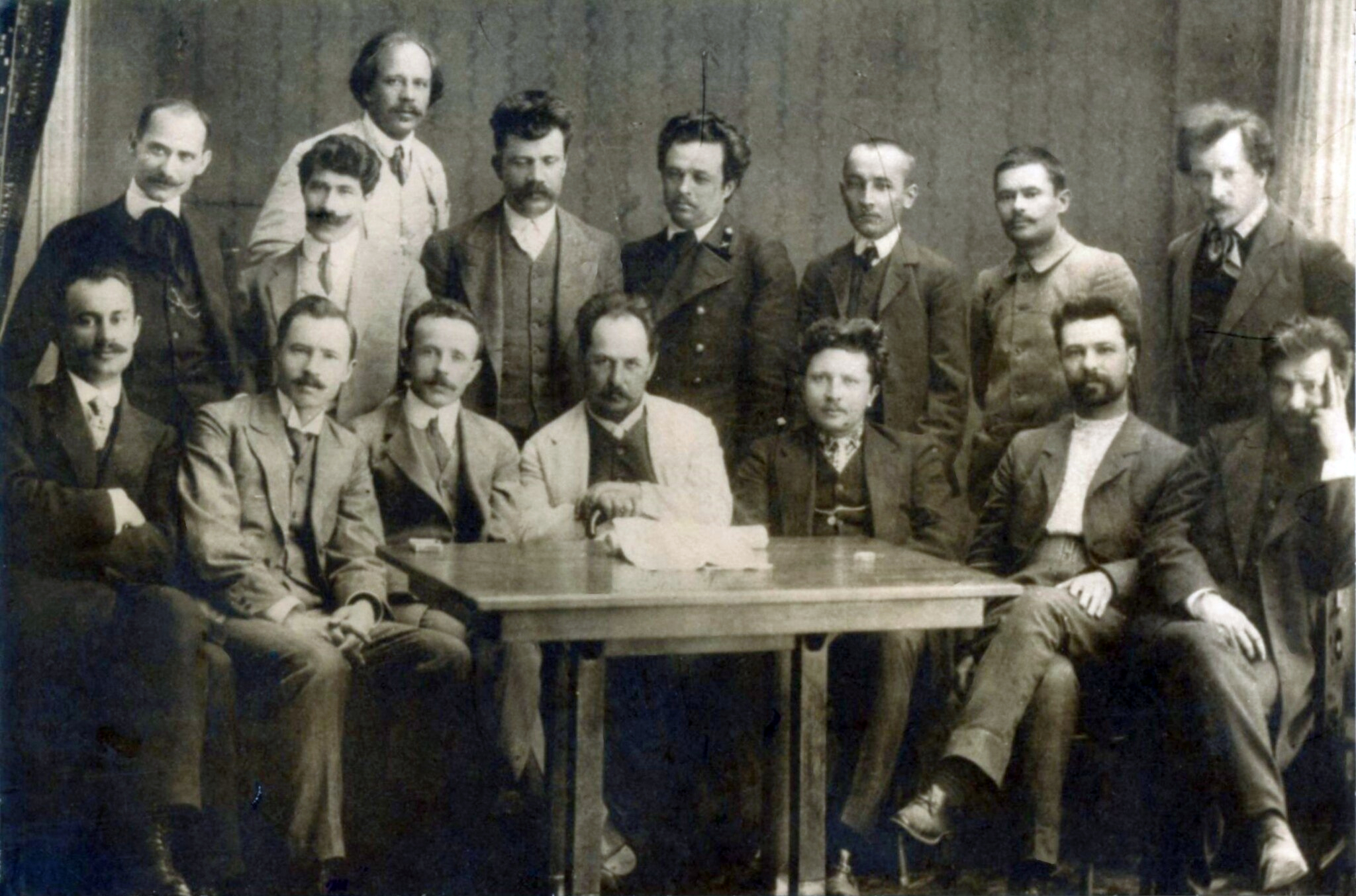
Members of Rada's editorial staff in 1908

Former seat of Rada's editorial office in Kyiv

=== Chief editors ===
- Fedir Matushevskyi (1906–1907)
- Mefodiy Pavlovskyi (1907–1913)
- Andriy Nikovskyi (1913–1914)

=== Secretaries ===
- Symon Petliura
- Vasyl Koroliv
- Pavlo Sabaldyr

=== Departments ===
- Ukrainian review (Dmytro Doroshenko)
- Foreign review (Mykhailo Lozynskyi)
- Russian review (Liudmyla Starytska-Cherniakhivska)
- School and education (Hryhoriy Sherstiuk)
- Social and economic affairs (Maksym Hekhter)
- Polish affairs (Bohdan Yaroshevskyi, Vyacheslav Lypynskyi)

== Legacy ==
In 2021 and 2026 two volumes of bibliographical directions to Rada's materials were presented by the Tempora publishing house in Kyiv. Two more volumes are expected to be published in the future.
