= Ems Ukaz =

1876 decree by Alexander II of Russia

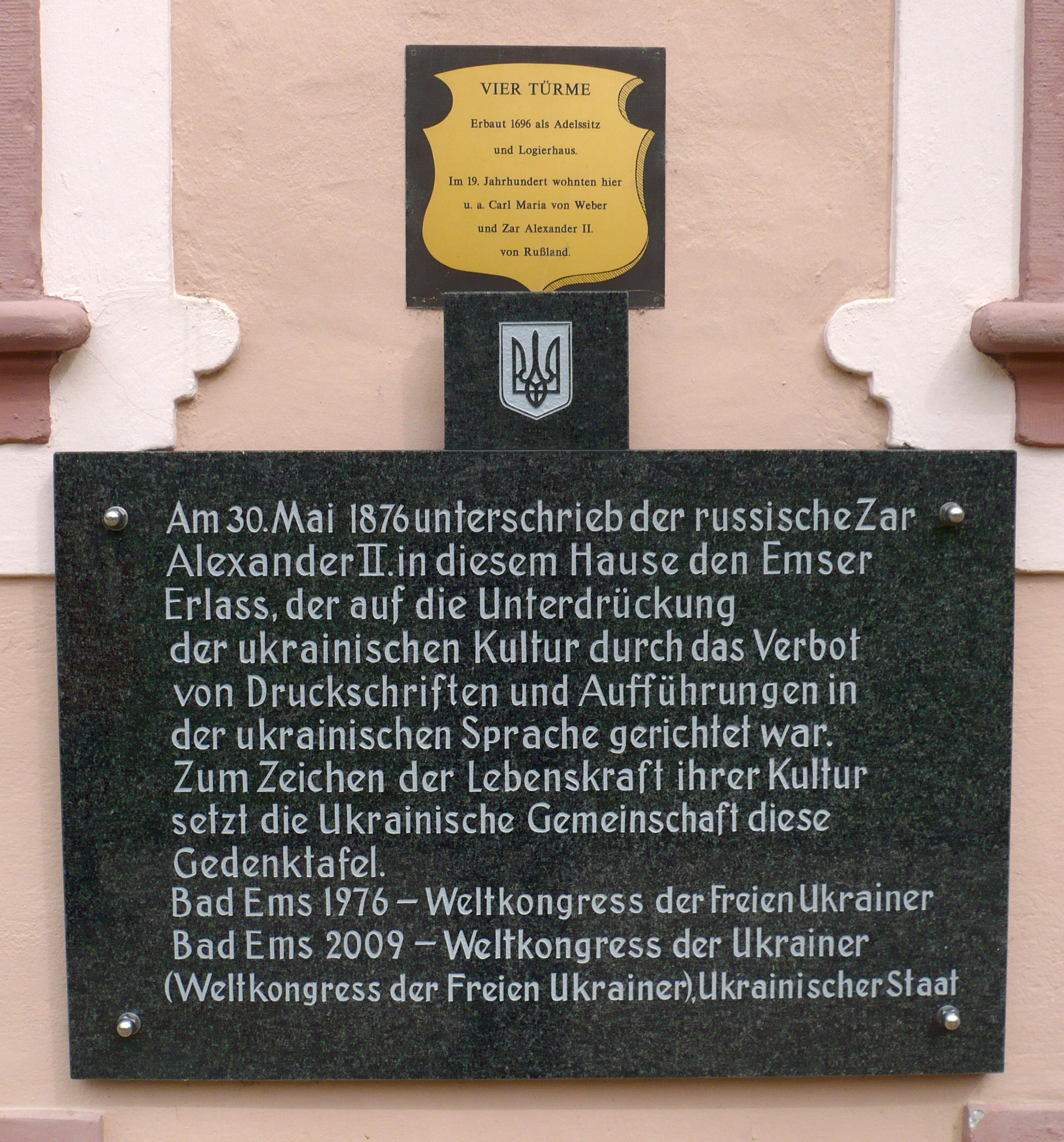
- Plaque dedicated to Ems Ukaz in Bad Ems
- Created: 1876
- Author: Emperor of Russia Alexander II
- Purpose: to prohibit the use of Ukrainian language

The Ems Ukaz or Ems Ukase (Russian: Эмсский указ, romanized: Emsskiy ukaz; Ukrainian: Емський указ, romanized: Ems'kyy ukaz), officially titled Resolutions of the Special Conference for Prevention of Ukrainophile Propaganda After Correction in Accordance with Remarks, Made by Alexander II on 18 May in Ems (Russian: Выводы Особого Совещания для пресечения украинофильской пропаганды после исправления в соответствии с замечаниями, сделанными Александром II 18 мая в г. Эмсе) was an internal decree (ukaz) of Emperor Alexander II of Russia issued on 30 May [O.S. 18 May] 1876 banning the use of the Ukrainian language in print except for reprinting old documents. The ukaz also forbade the import of Ukrainian publications and the staging of plays or lectures in Ukrainian. It was named after the city of Bad Ems, Germany, where it was promulgated. The decree limited the development of the Ukrainian language in the Russian Empire, however it was not fully effective and publishing and importation of Ukrainian-language media continued in a limited way.

== Background ==
In the 1860s, a decade and a half after the Imperial Russian government had broken up the Brotherhood of Sts Cyril and Methodius in Kiev (March 1847) and exiled or arrested its founder Mykola Kostomarov and other prominent figures, Ukrainian intellectuals gained further awareness of their cultural background. Hromada cultural associations, named after the traditional village assembly, started in a number of cities, and Sunday schools were established in cities and towns since the Russian Imperial administration had neglected education. The new cultural movement was partly driven by publications in both Russian and Ukrainian, including journals (such as Kostomarov's Osnova, 1861–1862, and Hlibov's Chernyhosvs'kyy Lystok, 1861–63), historical and folkloristic monographs (Kostomarov's biography of the Cossack hetman Bohdan Khmelnytsky, Kulish's two-volume folklore collection Zapiski o Yuzhnoy Rusi, Notes on Southern Rus', 1856–1857), and elementary primers (Kulish's Hramatka, 1857, 1861, Shevchenko's Bukvar Yuzhnoruskiy, 1861). In Osnova, Kostomarov published his influential article "Dve russkiye narodnosti" ("Two Russian Nationalities").

Although Ukrainianism had been considered popular and somewhat chic in Russian cultural circles, a debate began at the time over its relation to the ideology of Russian pan-Slavism, epitomised by a quotation of Pushkin ("will not all the Slavic streams merge into the Russian sea?"), and a rhetoric of criticism emerged. Conservative Russians called the Ukrainian movement a "Polish intrigue", and Polish commentators had been complaining that Ukrainianism had been used as a weapon against Polish culture in Right-Bank Ukraine.

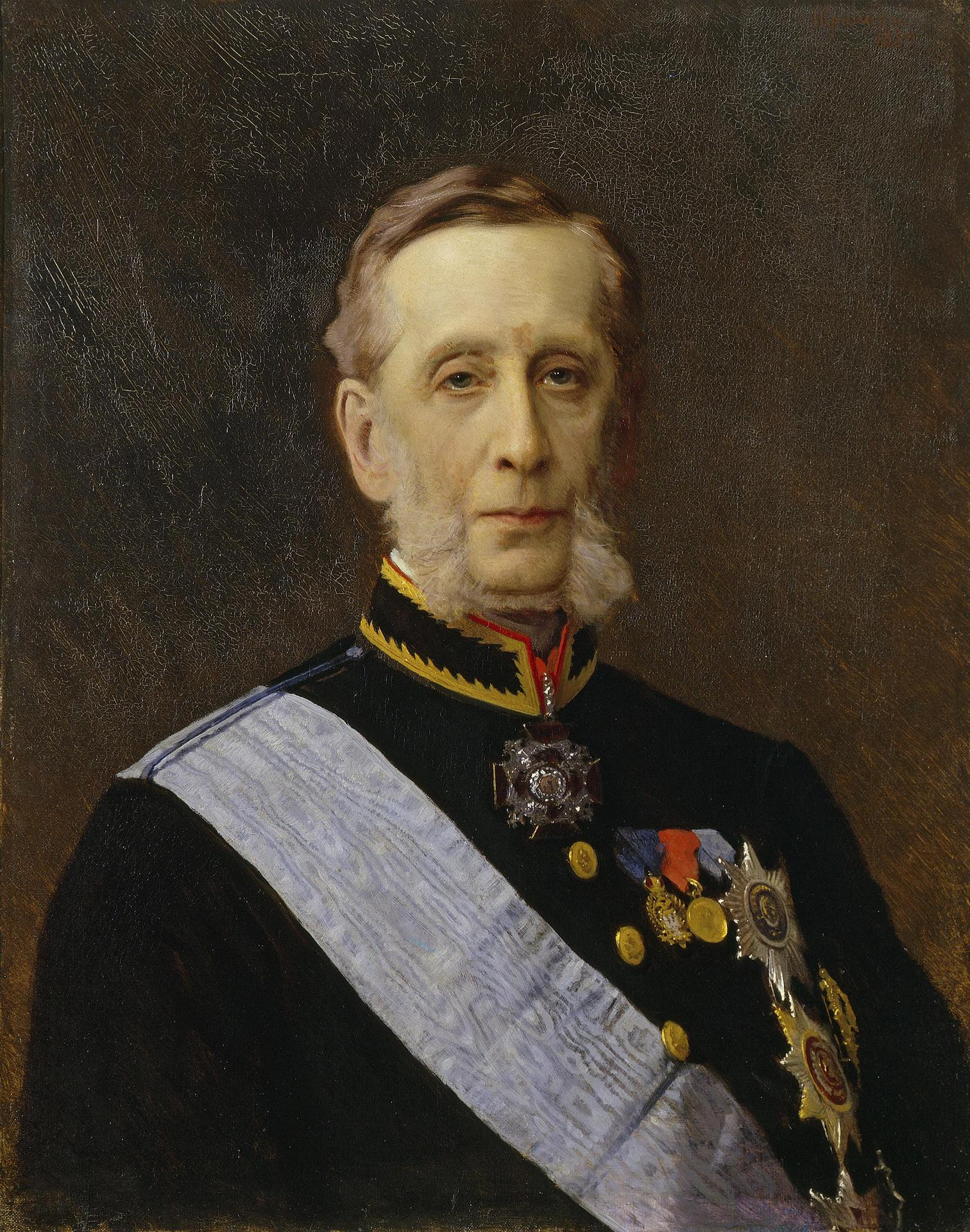
Portrait of Count Pyotr Valuyev in 1880

After the 1861 emancipation of the serfs in the Russian Empire, many landowners were unhappy with the loss of their serfs, and peasants were generally displeased with the terms of the emancipation. In the atmosphere of discontent, increasing reports reached the imperial government that Ukrainian leaders were plotting to separate from Russia. The 1863 January Uprising in Poland raised tensions around the issue of ethnic separatism in general even further. Several Ukrainian activists were arrested, Sunday schools and hromadas were closed, and their publication activities were suspended.

A new Ukrainian translation by Pylyp Morachevskyi of parts of the New Testament was vetted and passed by the Imperial Academy of Sciences but rejected by the Holy Synod of the Russian Orthodox Church because it was considered politically suspect. In response, Interior Minister Count Pyotr Valuyev issued a decree through an internal document circulated to the censors on 18 July 1863, known as Valuyev's Circular, which implemented a policy based on the opinion of the Kiev Censorship Committee, cited in the circular, that "the Ukrainian language never existed, does not exist, and shall never exist". The circular banned the publication of secular and religious books, apart from belles-lettres, on the premise that the distribution of such publications was a tool to foster separatist tendencies, coming primarily from Poland.

== Ems Ukaz ==
=== Immediate trigger and publication ===
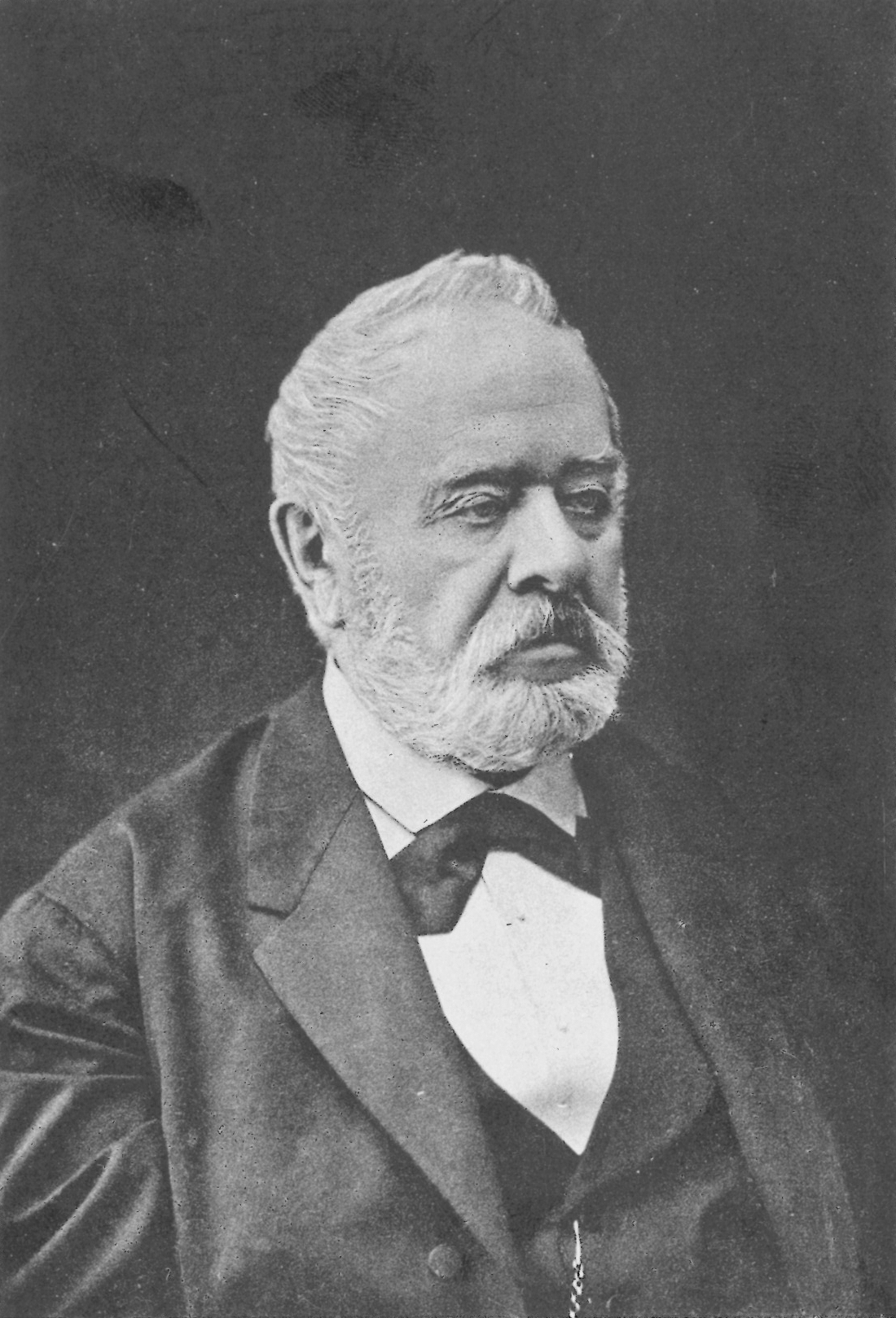
Mikhail Yuzefovich

In the 1870s, the Kiev Hromada and the Southwestern Branch of the Imperial Russian Geographic Society began to publish important works in on Ukrainian ethnography. The publications were in Russian language and were printed in Kiev, with their authors including Mykhailo Drahomanov, Volodymyr Antonovych, Ivan Rudchenko, and Pavlo Chubynsky. They held an Archaeological Congress in 1874, and published in the Russian-language paper Kievsky telegraf.

A member of the Geographic Society, Mikhail Yuzefovich, sent two letters to Saint Petersburg warning of separatist activity. Tsar Alexander II appointed an Imperial Commission on Ukrainophile Propaganda in the Southern Provinces of Russia, which found evidence of a danger to the state and recommended extending the scope of the Valuev Circular of 1863. While enjoying a spa in Bad Ems, Germany, on 18 May 1876, Alexander signed what would come to be called the Ems Ukaz, which extended the publication ban to all books and song lyrics in the "Little Russian dialect" and prohibited the import of such materials. Public lectures, plays, and song performances, as well as teaching of any discipline in Ukrainian were forbidden as well. Prohibited was also preservation or circulation of any Ukrainian book in school libraries. Teachers suspected of Ukrainophilism were removed from teaching.

=== Excerpt ===
The importation into the Russian Empire, without special permission of the Central Censorship over Printing, of all books and pamphlets in the Little Russian dialect, published abroad, is forbidden,

The printing and publishing in the Empire of original works and translations in this dialect is forbidden with the exception of (a) historical documents and monuments; (b) works of belles-lettres but with the provision that in the documents the orthography of the originals be retained; in works of belles-lettres no deviations from the accepted Russian orthography are permitted and permission for their printing may be given only by the Central Censorship over Printing.

All theatrical performances and lectures in the Little Russian dialect, as well as printing of text to musical notes, are forbidden.

—

=== Amendments ===
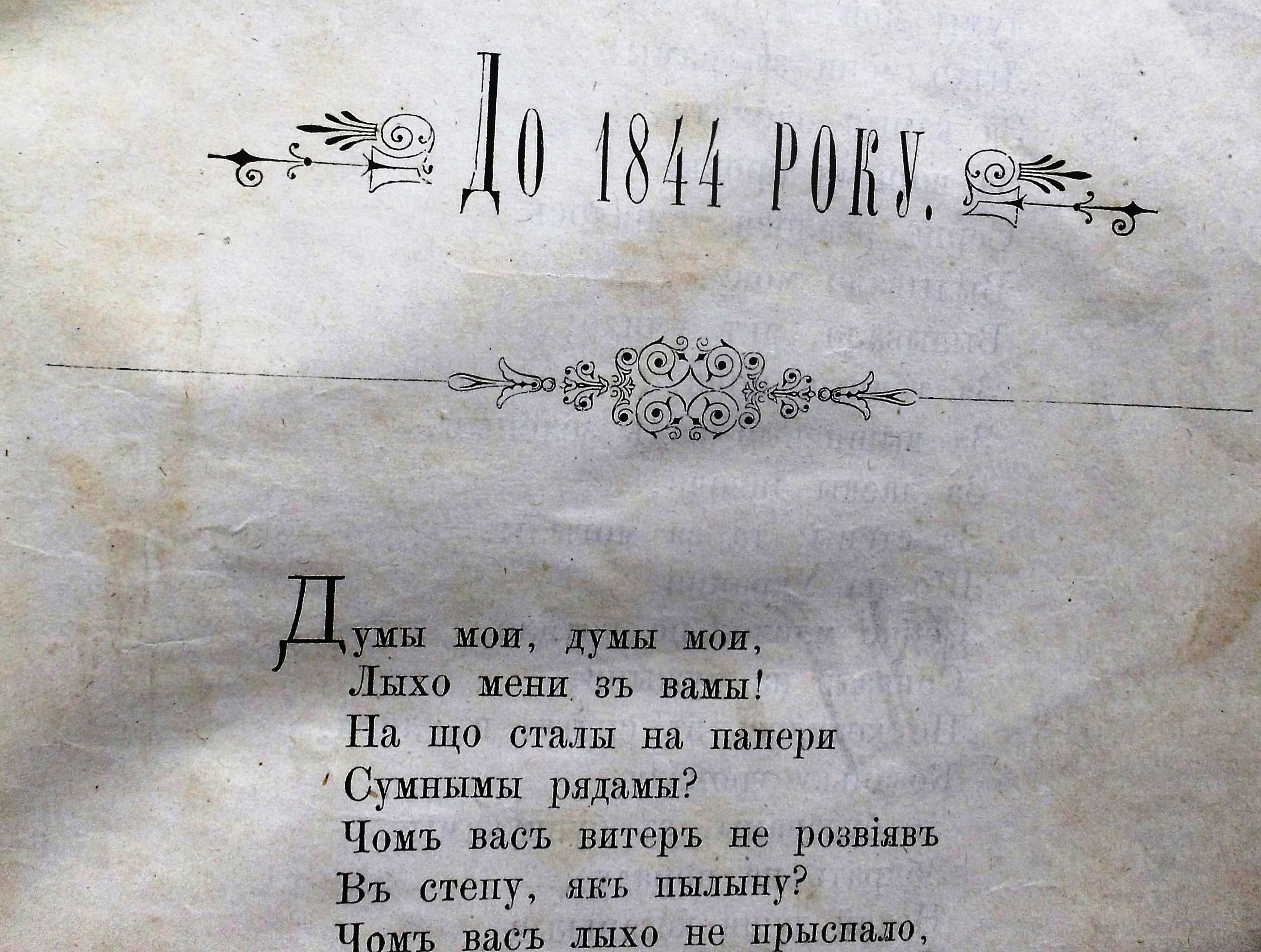
An example of Russian alphabet used for Ukrainian texts (yaryzhka) in an 1889 Kiev publication of Taras Shevchenko's Kobzar

In 1881, the new Tsar Alexander III amended the ukaz. Ukrainian lyrics and dictionaries were now allowed, but the Kulishivka Ukrainian alphabet was still prohibited, and such publications had to be composed in Ukrainian with Russian orthography. That usage was disparagingly called the Yaryzhka (Ukrainian: Ярижка, IPA: [jɐˈrɪʒkɐ]) by some Ukrainians in reference to the Russian letter yery ⟨ы⟩. Performance of Ukrainian plays and humorous songs could be approved by governors or governors-general, but Ukrainian-only theatres and troupes could not be established. Earlier, in 1879, Russian Interior Minister Mikhail Loris-Melikov had allowed the organization of theatrical performances and concerts in the Ukrainian language, but only on rural themes and outside Kiev.

Simultaneously, the 1881 amendments to the decree included a "secret ban" on the usage of Ukrainian in education and church service. In 1884, an additional decree prohibited Ukrainian theatrical performances in several governorates.

== Aftermath ==
=== Effects ===
As a result of the decree, Ukrainian culture suffered a severe blow. Along with the printing ban, it led to the disbandment of the Southwestern Branch of the Russian Georgaphic Society and closure of Kievsky telegraf newspaper. As its consequence, no Ukrainian books were printed in 1877. Nevertheless, many illegal performances and publications in Ukrainian language were delivered through ingenuity and bribery. Despite protests, the decree was never formally revoked by authorities.

The ukaz coincided with other actions against the Ukrainian culture. Drahomanov and the fellow activist Mykola Ziber were removed from their posts at Kiev's University of St. Vladimir and emigrated, along with other cultural leaders such as Fedir Vovk and Serhiy Podolynsky. The situation was exposed by Drahomanov at the 1878 Paris International Literary Congress.

The Ems Ukaz significantly limited the development of Ukrainian culture in Russia. The Hromada association, which had about 100 members before the ukaz, had only 14 after it, and in 1900 it was still only 25. The Ukrainian language was excluded from education at every level. No press, scientific papers or modern, ambitious literature were published in Ukrainian. As a result, it was slowly becoming the language of the lower, uneducated masses.

Thus, self-aware Ukrainians remained a small intelligentsia in Dnieper Ukraine that was out of touch with a much larger rural population, which lacked the opportunity for a cultural education. The Russian imperial ideology dominated the schools and the army, and the Russian language was the only one used for official business in the urban workplace, government offices, and public services. In the meantime, Ukrainian self-identity would grow in Austro-Hungarian Galicia, which was out of reach of Russian imperial authorities.

Nonetheless, according to Ukrainian historian George Shevelov, a plan to silence and annihilate Ukrainian literature failed completely. Books in Ukrainian were still published in the Russian Empire, albeit in the Russian alphabet and often after many years of effort. The Kievskaia Starina editors owned a bookstore with Ukrainian books in Kyiv. In 1898, the Moscow-based Charitable Society for the Publication of Inexpensive Books for General Use began printing Ukrainian books for the Ukrainian peasantry. In 1903, Kiev Governor-General Mikhail Dragomirov allowed Kievskaia Starina to publish fiction in Ukrainian.

The ban on the import of Ukrainian newspapers and books into Russia has been similarly ineffective. Ukrainian newspapers published in Galicia had numerous subscribers in Russian Ukraine (Zorja, for example, had 400 subscribers in 1890–1896).

=== Campaign to overturn the ban ===
A movement aimed to achieve an overturn of the bans started in the early 1900s. The campaign involved several delegations, which were sent to the Russian capital in order to meet officials and convey to them the desire of Ukrainian people to use their native language in publishing and education. Ukrainians also joined representatives of other nations, signing resolutions with condemnation of the Russian Empire's national policies. In 1901 Yevhen Chykalenko sent a petition to the Main Directorate of Printing Affairs in Saint Petersburg, seeking approval for publishing a Ukrainian-language magazine, but failed to achieve success despite the support of the local Ukrainian community. In 1904, a similar request was sent by Serhiy Yefremov, who appealed directly to Interior Minister Pyotr Svyatopolk-Mirsky. Despite promises of authorities to review his request, Yefremov eventually received a negative answer, as the government considered itself to have no competence to overturn the previous bans and proposed to establish a special committee instead.

=== De-facto abolition ===
A 1906 issue of Hromadska Dumka, a Ukrainian-language periodical, which started publishing following the previous year's revolution, marking the dawn of Ukrainian daily press

The Manifesto of 17 October and other proclamations made by Russian authorities in autumn 1905 allowed publications in the Ukrainian language at least on paper, however they didn't remove numerous administrative and censorship hurdles, preserving a biased attitude to the Ukrainian language from the side of the government.

After the Russian Revolution of 1905, the Imperial Academy of Sciences recommended the lifting of the ukaz's restrictions. Ukrainian-language newspapers began publication; Prosvita ('Enlightenment') educational societies were formed; some university professors lectured in Ukrainian; and the Orthodox bishop of the Podolia vicariate, Parfeniy Levytsky, allowed the language to be used in services and church schools there.

In 1910, concerned about potential revolutionary activity, Interior Minister Pyotr Stolypin restored the ukaz's restrictions and shut down the Prosvita societies and Ukrainian-language publications. The Russian-language press and intellectuals launched a campaign against the idea of Ukrainian autonomy or separatism.

The ukaz was never cancelled but became void, along with all other Imperial Russian laws, in the February Revolution of 1917–1918. After the Revolution, Ukrainian language, education, and culture was allowed to flower in the Ukrainian Democratic Republic and the Hetmanate, and briefly, under the Ukrainization policies of Soviet Ukraine before 1931.

== See also ==
- Valuev Circular
