= Symyrenko family =

Ukrainian industrial and business family

Symyrenko Симиренко
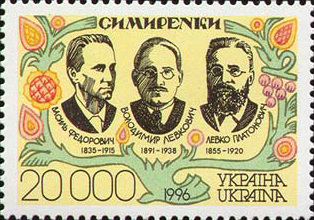
- Three members of the Symyrenko family depicted on a 1996 stamp of Ukraine. From left to right: Vasyl, Volodymyr, Levko
- Country: Ukraine
- Origin: Dnieper Ukraine (Right-bank)
- Founded: 18th century
- Founder: Andrii Symyrenko
- Connected families: Yakhnenko
- Traditions: Patronage of Ukrainian culture, sugar industry dominance

The Symyrenko family (Ukrainian: Симиренко, plural form Ukrainian: Симиренки, romanized: Symyrenky) was a Ukrainian industrial and business family prominent under the late Cossack Hetmanate, the Russian Empire and the early Soviet Union. The Symyrenkos were among Ukraine's most powerful landed families, rising to dominate the sugar beet industry by the Russian Revolution. They are also known for their patronage of Ukrainian culture, including the financial support they provided to writer and poet Taras Shevchenko and Kievskaia starina.

== Background ==
The earliest records of the Symyrenko family are in the late 18th century, under the Cossack Hetmanate, when the founders of the family, Andrii Symyrenko and his son Stepan, were first mentioned. Following the end of the Russo-Turkish War of 1768–1774, the Hetmanate was annexed by the Russian Empire. Stepan, a Cossack and later a chumak for 20 years, refused to pledge allegiance to Russian Empress Catherine the Great; as a result, the Symyrenko family's privileges were revoked and they were placed into serfdom. Stepan and his family were serfs under the Branicki and Vorontsov families of landed nobility.

== Freedom from serfdom and wealth ==
The harsh conditions of serfdom, including forced labour and obedience to the landlord class, led Stepan Symyrenko's son Fedir to seek freedom. Fedir married Anastasiia Yakhnenko, the daughter of another local serf, and collected money from leasing the Vorontsov family's mills along the Vilshanka river, as well as the trade of grain, livestock and sugar, he bought himself out of serfdom c. the 1830s. He also earned money by working alongside the men of the Yakhnenko family (Terentii, Kindrat and Stepan), who were locally known for their trade in grain, flour and hides, as well as their profitable mills in Smila and Uman. According to sugar industry historian Olha Shevchenko, a company known as The Brothers Yakhnenko and Symyrenko (Ukrainian: Брати Яхненки й Симиренко, romanized: Braty Yakhnenky i Symyrenko) existed by 1815–1820. The company mills, shops and warehouses throughout Ukraine, including six trading houses in the Black Sea port city of Odessa, where they sold flour and hides. After earning his freedom, Fedir and Mykhailo Yakhnenko, a member of the Yakhnenko family, established the first mechanised, steam-powered sugar factor in the Russian Empire in 1834.

By the 1840s, the Symyrenkos were one of the most powerful families in right-bank Ukraine, having become "sugar barons" for their control over sugar beet production. The Symyrenkos were one of several dominant families in the region, alongside the ethnically-Ukrainian Yakhnenkos and Tereshchenkos, the Jewish Brodskys and Halperins and the Russian Bobrinskys, though the Polish Branicki and Potocki families controlled the largest factories. At the time, these factories were critical for supplying sugar to Europe, as sugar beet, which grew best in right-bank Ukraine, was the only feasible source for large-scale production of sugar on the continent.

The Symyrenkos were also involved in philanthropy from 1830, when they provided free agricultural aid to peasants suffering from a famine. During the 1853–1856 Crimean War, they donated 1,000 rubles and bread to hospitals and the Imperial Russian Army. Fedir's sons, Vasyl and Platon were especially fond of Ukrainian art and culture. Platon had a close relationship with writer and poet Taras Shevchenko from 1859, assisting in the publication of the final edition of Kobzar published in Shevchenko's lifetime. Vasyl was a longtime supporter of the Hromada society in Odessa, funded the Kievskaia starina journal and was an associate of several Ukrainian nationalist intellectuals (namely Volodymyr Antonovych, Yevhen Chykalenko, Mykhailo Hrushevsky, Mykola Leontovych, Mykola Lysenko and Volodymyr Naumenko). Upon his death, he bequeathed his entire wealth (10 million rubles) to Ukrainian cultural organisations, to be managed by a trust; this trust eventually failed to distribute the money as a result of the outbreak of World War I and the Russian Revolution.

== Soviet life and exile ==
Following the 1917 October Revolution, the family was subject to repression; Levko Symyrenko, Platon's son and a pomologist who owned one of the largest plant nurseries in Europe, was killed in 1920 under unclear circumstances, with website Ukraïner stating that "most researchers believe the culprits were Chekists or employees of the Soviet secret police".

Levko's son, Volodymyr Symyrenko, was an ideological socialist who had supported the Ukrainian People's Republic, working in its government; following the UPR's defeat and the establishment of the Ukrainian Soviet Socialist Republic, the nursery was nationalised, though Volodymyr became director of the newly-established State Pomological Nursery based at the nursery. The nursery served as a centre for horticultural activities in the early years of the Soviet Union, with Volodymyr overseeing all horticultural institutions throughout Ukraine, Russia and the Transcaucasian SFSR. He retained a position of prestige in both Soviet and global horticultural circles until 1933, when he was arrested as an enemy of the people for his rejection of Ivan Michurin's beliefs on pomology. He was later executed at Lukyanivska Prison. His daughter, Tania, later left Ukraine for Canada, while his son Alex left for the United States.

== Members ==
- Andrii Symyrenko
  - Stepan Symyrenko (d. late 18th century)
    - Fedir Symyrenko (1795—1867)
      - Vasyl Symyrenko (1831–1915)
      - Platon Symyrenko (1821–1863)
        - Levko Symyrenko (1855–1920)
          - Volodymyr Symyrenko (1891–1938)
            - Alex Simirenko (1931–1979)
            - Tania Simirenko Thorpe (1926–2001)
          - Tetiana Symyrenko
