= Alex Simirenko =

Ukrainian-American sociologist (1931–1979)

- Олекса Симиренко
- Born: Oleksa Volodymyrovych Symyrenko; September 6, 1931; Kyiv, Ukrainian SSR, Soviet Union
- Died: April 27, 1979 (aged 47); State College, Pennsylvania, United States

Academic background
- Education: University of Minnesota (PhD, 1961)

Academic work
- Discipline: Sociologist
- Sub-discipline: Ethnic studies, sociology in the Soviet Union
- Institutions: University of Nevada, Reno (1960–1969); California State University, Northridge (1968–1971); Pennsylvania State University (1969–1979)

Alex Simirenko (Ukrainian: Олекса Володимирович Симиренко, romanized: Oleksa Volodymyrovych Symyrenko; (Note: In this name that follows East Slavic naming customs, the patronymic is Volodymyrovych and the family name is Symyrenko.) 6 September 1931 – 27 April 1979) was a Ukrainian-American sociologist. A member of the Symyrenko family, he was a specialist in American ethnic studies and Soviet sociology.

== Biography ==
Alex Simirenko was born on September 6, 1931 in Kyiv, at the time part of the Soviet Union. He was a member of the prestigious Symyrenko family, a Zaporozhian Cossack family known for its scientific contributions, patronage of Ukrainian culture and support for Ukrainian independence. His father was Volodymyr Symyrenko, a pomologist. Following his father's 1933 arrest by the Soviet government, Alex and his family fled to Kherson; he resettled with his mother in Prague later in the decade. During Ukraine's occupation by Nazi Germany, the family returned to the Symyrenko estate, and Alex's mother worked as a schoolteacher before the family again fled in 1943, residing at a displaced persons camp in Augsburg following the war's end. They migrated to the United States in 1950, arriving in Philadelphia.

In the United States, Simirenko studied at the University of Minnesota at his mother's urging, graduating in 1957 and earning his PhD in 1961. He taught at the University of Nevada from 1960 to 1969 as professor of sociology, as well as California State University, Northridge (1968–1971) and Pennsylvania State University (1969–1979). During this time, Simirenko published three books: Pilgrims, Colonists and Frontiersmen: An Ethnic Community in Transition (1964), focusing on the Russian American or Rusyn American community of Minneapolis; Soviet Sociology: Historical Antecedents and Current Appraisals (1966); and Social Thought in the Soviet Union (1969). Another work, The Professionalization of Soviet Society, was published posthumously in 1982.

As a scholar, Simirenko's research was focused on American ethnic studies and sociology in the Soviet Union. He was a member of the American Sociological Association, the Society for the Study of Social Problems and the Association for the Study of Nationalities, of which he was a founding member. He was a supporter of Ukrainian independence and liberal democracy, though Vernon V. Aspaturian of Pennsylvania State University noted upon his death that Pilgrims, Colonists and Frontiersmen was controversial among the Minneapolis Ukrainian community for its focus on the city's older Slavic community.

Simirenko died on April 27, 1979 in State College, Pennsylvania; Aspaturian credited his time in the displaced persons camp as a cause of his early death, noting that he suffered from "severe bronchial and allergic ailments" from the time he spent at the camp.
