= Serhiy Yefremov =

Ukrainian literary journalist (1876–1939)

- Сергій Єфремов
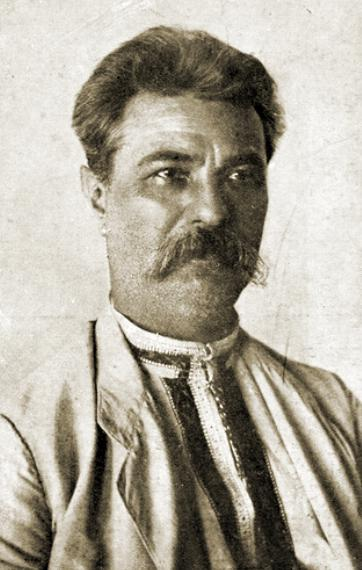
- Serhiy Oleksandrovych Yefremov

Secretary of Nationalities
- In office June 28, 1917 – July 17, 1917
- Prime Minister: Volodymyr Vynnychenko
- Preceded by: position created
- Succeeded by: Oleksandr Shulhyn

Personal details
- Born: October 18, 1876 Palchyk, Kyiv Governorate, Russian Empire (now Cherkasy Oblast, Ukraine)
- Died: March 31, 1939 (aged 62) (speculative) Vladimir, Soviet Union
- Party: Ukrainian Party of Socialists-Federalists
- Domestic partner: Onysia Durdukivska
- Occupation: public and political activist, statesman, literal critic, historian of literature, academician
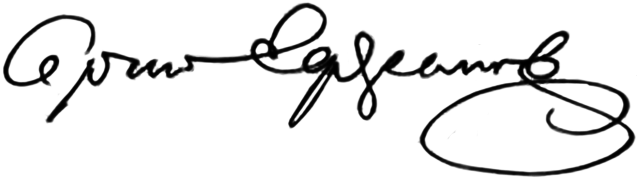
- Signature

Serhiy Oleksandrovych Yefremov (Ukrainian: Сергій Олександрович Єфремов; October 18 (O.S. 6), 1876 – March 31, 1939) was a Ukrainian literary journalist, historian, critic, political activist, statesman, and academician. He was a member of the Ukrainian Academy of Sciences (1919) and Shevchenko Scientific Society in Lviv.

== Biography ==
=== Early years ===
The family of Serhii Oleksandrovich Yefremov belonged to the clergy. One of the ancestors of the family had to change his original Ukrainian surname Okhrimenko to the Russian Yefremov (Ukrainian name Okhrim – corresponds to Russian Yefrem) in order to receive a parish after the destruction of the autonomy of the Cossack Hetmanate in 1764.

Serhiy Yefremov was born in the village of Palchyk, Petrykivka Volost, Zvenigorodka uezd of the Kyiv Governorate (now part of Cherkasy Raion of the Cherkasy Oblast, in central Ukraine). He was born as one of numerous children in an Eastern Orthodox priestly family; one of his brothers would serve as the head of Kyiv Theological Seminary. Serhiy himself studied at the establishment in 1891–1896, but didn't finish it. Later he graduated from the Faculty of Law at Saint Vladimir Imperial University of Kyiv. During his youth Yefremov's worldview was particularly influenced by the figures of classical authors Mykola Hohol, Oleksandr Konysky and Borys Hrinchenko.

=== Political start ===
Yefremov's political activity started during his student years, when he became a member of the Ukrainian Universal Nonpartisan Democratic Organization. In 1904 he became a co-founder of the Ukrainian Radical Party, which in 1905 united together with the Ukrainian Democratic Party, establishing the Ukrainian Democratic Radical Party. In 1905 he became the leader of the Ukrainian Social Union (USU) Peasant Union. In 1908 Yefremov co-founded the Society of Ukrainian Progressionists. He worked in the variety of Ukrainian periodicals such as Zoria, Pravda, Kyivan Past, Ukraina etc. Yefremov also contributed to the activities of Prosvita society.

=== Secretariat ===
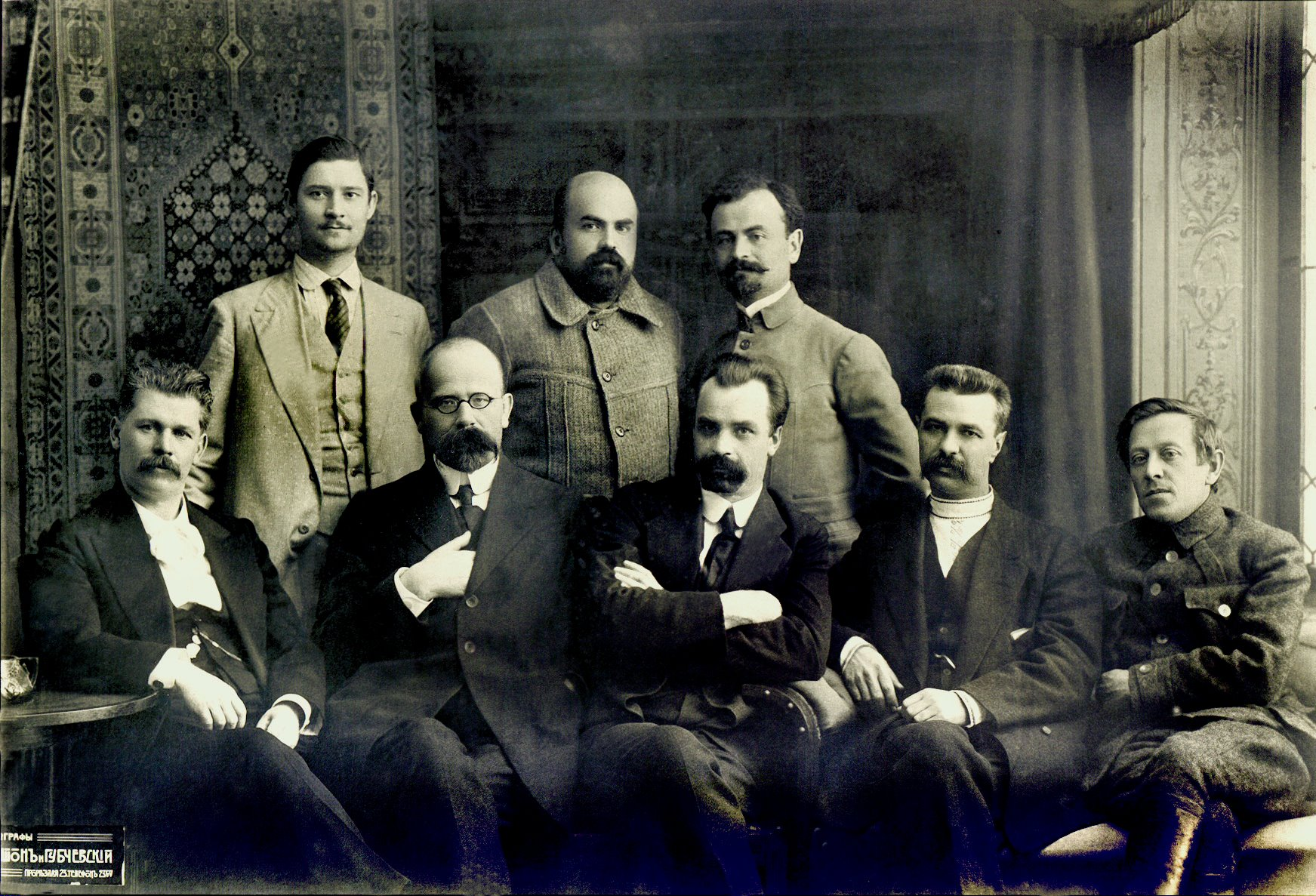
Yefremov (2nd from right) along with other members of the General Secretariat of Ukraine

Yefremov was arrested numerous times by Russian authorities for pressing public speeches in defense of national culture and political freedoms during the pre-revolutionary period. In March 1917, he entered the staff of the Central Rada. In April 1917, at the Ukrainian National Congress, he was elected deputy head of the Rada and a member of the Mala Rada. On June 15, 1917 he became general secretary of the International Affairs in the newly formed Ukrainian government, General Secretariat of the Ukrainian People's Republic. Yefremov was known as the godfather of the Ukrainian People's Republic, as it was his proposal to introduce that name for the newly proclaimed state. On July 17, 1917 he was replaced on his post by his party comrade Oleksandr Shulhyn. From September 1917 Yefremov served as head of the Ukrainian Party of Socialists-Federalists. He also participated in the Ukrainian delegation leading talks with the Provisional Government.

Despite his support of Ukraine's cultural freedom, Yefremov promoted the idea of Ukraine's autonomy as part of a larger federal state, first introduced by Mykhailo Drahomanov. He was reluctant to support the declaration of Ukraine's independence, emphasizing the great responsibility carried by its initiators, and viewed the future of the country as part of a broader European federation.

=== Soviet Ukraine ===
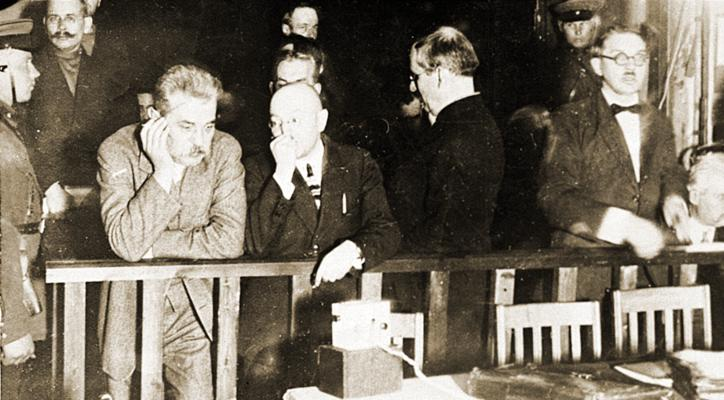
Yefremov (left) during the Union of the Freedom of Ukraine trial in 1930

With the installation of Soviet power in Ukraine, Yefremov was forced to go into hiding. In spring 1919, at the request of the Ukrainian Academy of Sciences, he was amnestied. Not willing to emigrate and abandon his compatriots, Yefremov agreed to work with the Soviet system, concentrating on scientific afairs. From 1922 until 1928, he was one of the leaders of the Ukrainian Academy of Sciences.

Starting from the mid-1920s, a deliberate campaign started against Yefremov and his supporters in the Soviet media, leading to his eventual arrest in August 1929. Yefremov was the chief defendant in the public show trial of the leaders of the supposed Union for the Liberation of Ukraine. Under pressure from authorities, who threatened to arrest his wife, Yefremov was forced to confess of crimes ascribed to him by the prosecution. In 1930, he was sentenced to death, but the sentence was later commuted to ten years of imprisonment. Having spent 7 years in a political prison in Yaroslavl, he was later transferred to Vladimir. Yefremov died in 1939 in Vladimir Central Prison.

In 1989, Yefremov and other defendants of the Union for the Liberation of Ukraine process were posthumously rehabilitated, with the case being closed due to lack of evidence.

== Personal life ==
During his studies at the Kyiv Theological Academy, Yefremov got acquainted with Onysia Durdukivska, who belonged to a fellow family of clergymen. Their relationship persisted until the end of his life, but the couple was unable to officially get married due to opposition of their relatives, and had to live in a civil partnership.

== Literary career ==
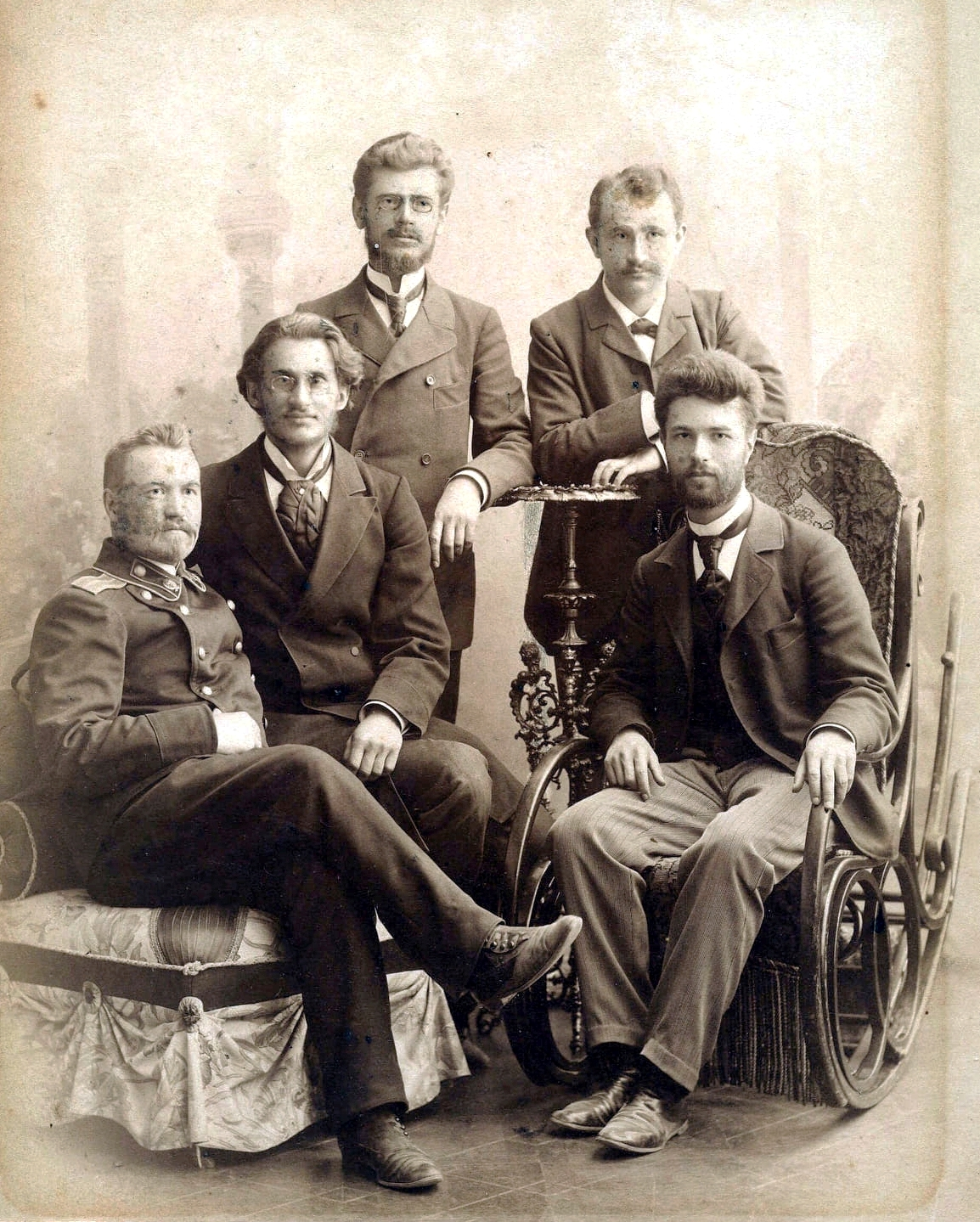
Yefremov with fellow publishers in 1900

Together with Oleksandr Lototskyi, Volodymyr Durdukivskyi, Vasyl Domanytskyi and Fedir Matushevskyi, Yefremov established the Vik publishing house, which he headed in 1895–1918. He contributed to the development of Ukrainian literature and also acted as a literary critic, promoting a distinct national canon of ideas as a replacement for direct copying of Western examples by authors. In 1902 he authored an article directed against Symbolism and Decadent movement in art, criticizing works of contemporary Ukrainian authors such as Mykola Voronyi, Hnat Khotkevych and Olha Kobylianska. That position of his was deemed too radical by Ivan Franko. Yefremov also published scientific studies dedicated to literary works by Taras Shevchenko and Marko Vovchok, and in 1911 created a fundamental history of Ukrainian literature. Later in his career, Yefremov continued literary studies as a member of the Ukrainian Academy of Sciences.

Yefremov was one of the first Ukrainian intellectual to earn his living exclusively from literary work. During the Russian Revolution of 1905, he became a pioneer of Ukrainian publicism, and authored the first Ukrainian-language article to be published in a Russian-language publication. His activities as journalist were highly acclaimed by Yevhen Chykalenko. In total, Yefremov published over 3,000 articles, reviews and other materials. He also participated in editorial committees of press publications Hromadska Dumka, Nova Hromada and Nova Rada. One of his notable publications was the letter to Yuriy Kotsiubynskyi, which condemned his collaboration with the Bolsheviks as a betrayal of his own father's legacy.Following the establishment of Soviet rule, he authored a diary, which serves an important source on the history of Kyiv during the 1920s.

A follower of narodnik ideas, Yefremov rejected aesthetics as the main principle of literary history. According to him, historically Ukrainian literature had been based around the ideas of personal freedom, national liberation and development of popular forms and contents. He criticized literature of the 17th and 18th centuries as artificial, scholastic and detached from real life, and concentrated his attention on studying New Ukrainian literature of the 19th century.

Yefremov's History of the Ukrainian Writing, 1924

=== Notable publications ===
- In Search of the New Beauty (В поисках новой красоты, Kievskaya Starina, 1902)
- Marko Vovchok (Марко Вовчок, 1907)
- History of the Ukrainian Writing (Історії українського письменства, in 4 editions, 1911-1924)
- Shevchenko (Шевченко, 1924)
- The Singer of Struggle and Contrasts (Співець боротьби і контрастів, dedicated to Ivan Franko, 1913)
- M. Kotsiubynskyi (М. Коцюбинський, 1922)
- Nechui-Levytskyi (Нечуй-Левицький, 1924)
- Karpenko-Karyi (Карпенко-Карий, 1924)
- Panas Myrnyi (Панас Мирний, 1928)
- Diary and Letters of Taras Shevchenko (academic publication, 1927-1928)
- Diary (Щоденник, written in 1923-1929, first published in 1994)
