= Volodymyr Leontovych =

- Володимир Леонтович
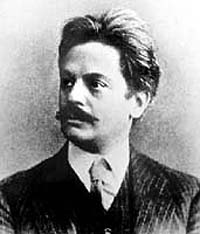
- Leontovych in 1912
- Born: 5 August 1866; Orikhivshchyna, Poltava Governorate, Russian Empire
- Died: 10 December 1933 (aged 67); Prague, Czechoslovakia
- Education: University of Moscow
- Occupations: Public figure, politician, philanthropist, landowner, writer, ethnographer
- Writing career
- Pen name: Volodymyr Levenko (Володимир Левенко)
- Years active: 1890–1933
- Literary movement: Realism

Signature
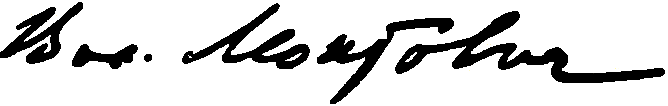

Volodymyr Leontovych (Ukrainian: Володимир Леонтович; 5 August 1866 – 10 December 1933) was a Ukrainian civic activist, writer and politician. Under the Ukrainian State he served as the Minister of Agriculture in the Lyzohub Government.

== Biography ==
Volodymyr Leontovych was born at the khutir Orikhivshchyna near Lubny in the Russian Empire (today part of Khorol, Poltava Oblast, Ukraine) to a noble family of Ukrainian, Greek and French origin. Part of his descendants belonged to the Orthodox szlachta of the Polish-Lithuanian Commonwealth, who moved from Right-bank Ukraine into the Hetmanate and became members of the Cossack starshyna. His distant relative was the Ukrainian philanthropist Vasyl Symyrenko.

Leontovych graduated from the University of Moscow with a degree in law. During his studies he published a work dedicated to the history of landownership in Ukraine from the times of Bohdan Khmelnytsky to the rule of Catherine II. An expert agronomist, Leontovych himself owned over 800 desiatinas of land and a sugar factory and published a scientific study dedicated to agriculture. He also engaged in ethnographic studies in cooperation with Borys Hrinchenko.

Leontovych belonged to the liberal camp of the Ukrainian national movement and was a member of the Old Hromada in Kyiv. He personally financed the publication of several Ukrainian periodicals and creation of public libraries. He also supported the translation of the Holy Scriptures into Ukrainian and was a member and sponsor of the Shevchenko Scientific Society. Leontovych also took part in the activities of the Union of Ukrainian Progressivists.

On 22 October 1918 Leontovych was appointed Minister of Land Affairs of hetman Pavlo Skoropadsky's Ukrainian State. On that post he was tasked with preparing the execution of agrarian reform, which was based on private ownership of land and envisioned mandatory purchase of major landholdings by the state with their subsequent division between poorer peasants. That reform proposed an alternative to the radical Bolshevik scenario of land repartition and has been highly evaluated by experts. However, the reform plan was discarded following the overthrow of the Hetmanate.

Following his removal from government, Leontovych joined the Ukrainian Red Cross and moved to Odesa, where he served as a negotiator with the French command occupying the city during that time. He harshly criticized the anti-Ukrainian attitudes of the White Movement active in the city. Following the arrival of the Bolsheviks, Leontovych emigrated to Berlin and later settled in Prague. Having lost his property as a result of Bolshevik occupation, he spent his later years in poverty, but continued to engage literary work. He died in December 1933 in Prague, soon after receiving the news of the Holodomor in Ukraine.

== Literary works ==
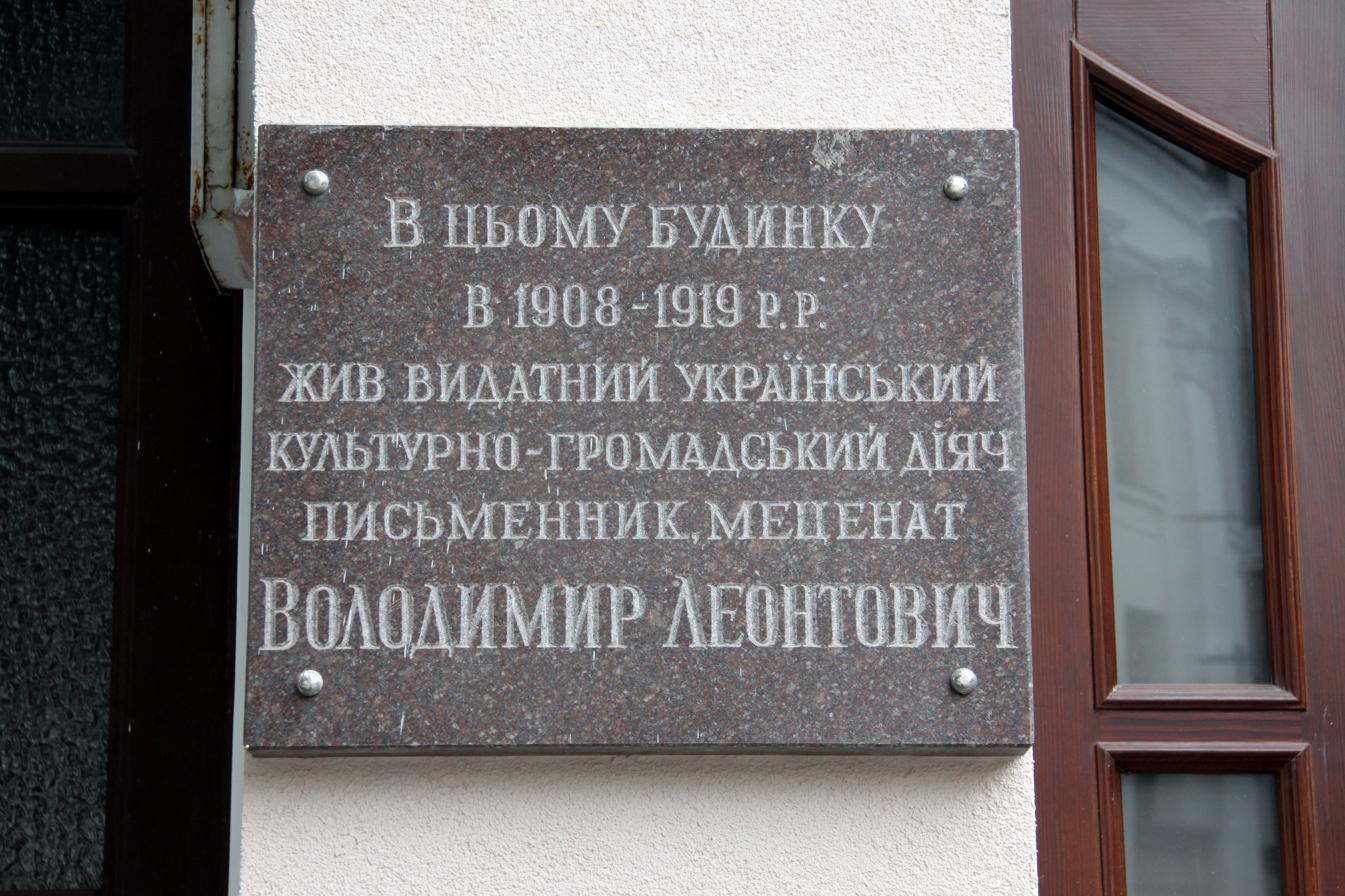
A memorial plaque to Leontovych in Kyiv

Leontovych authored several works of literature dedicated to the life and traditions of peasants in Ukraine. Some of his publications were made under the pseudonym Volodymyr Levenko. Leontovych's realistic prose criticized the social inequality and moral degradation of the society and received high acclaim of the Ukrainian author Ivan Franko. His 1903 novella Abdul-Hazis, first published in 1918, contained veiled criticism of the Russian colonial policies in respect to Crimean Tatars. Following his emigration, Leontovych authored a book of memoirs. He also co-authored a Russian-Ukrainian law dictionary.

=== Notable publications ===
- Soldiers' Desolation (Салдатський розрух, 1890)
- Lords and People (Пани і люди, 1893)
- Per pedes apostolorum (1897)
- The Old and the New (Старе й нове, 1898, 1913)
- Short Stories (Оповідання, 1918)
- Memories of a Runaway (Спомини утікача, 1922)
- Chronicle of the Hrechka family (Хроніка родини Гречок, 1922)
- Childhood and Youth Years of Volodia Hankevych (Дитячі й юнацькі роки Володі Ганкевича, 1959) - published posthumously
