= Theotokos Samarska =

Religious icon

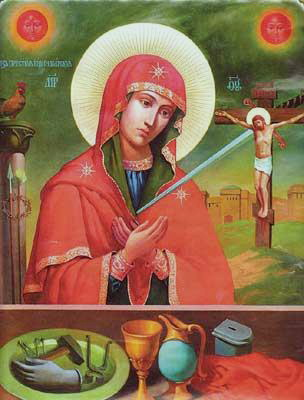

Theotokos of Novi Kodaky or Theotokos Samarska (Ukrainian: Самарська ікона Пресвятої Богородиці) is a Christian Orthodox icon that has been venerated by the Zaporozhian Cossacks of the Dnieper Ukraine on April 24.

The icon appeared in the village of Novi Kodaky, 7 versts northwest of Yekaterinoslav (now Dnipro), at some point in the 18th century. Its origin is believed to lie in the Orient. By the mid-1760s, the icon, then kept in the local church of St. Nicholas, attracted crowds of pilgrims, including high-placed officers and generals. Nowadays it is the centerpiece of the Trinity Cathedral in Dnipro.
