= Volodymyr Pavlovych Naumenko =

Ukrainian pedagogue and politician (1852–1919)

Volodymyr Naumenko
- Володимир Науменко
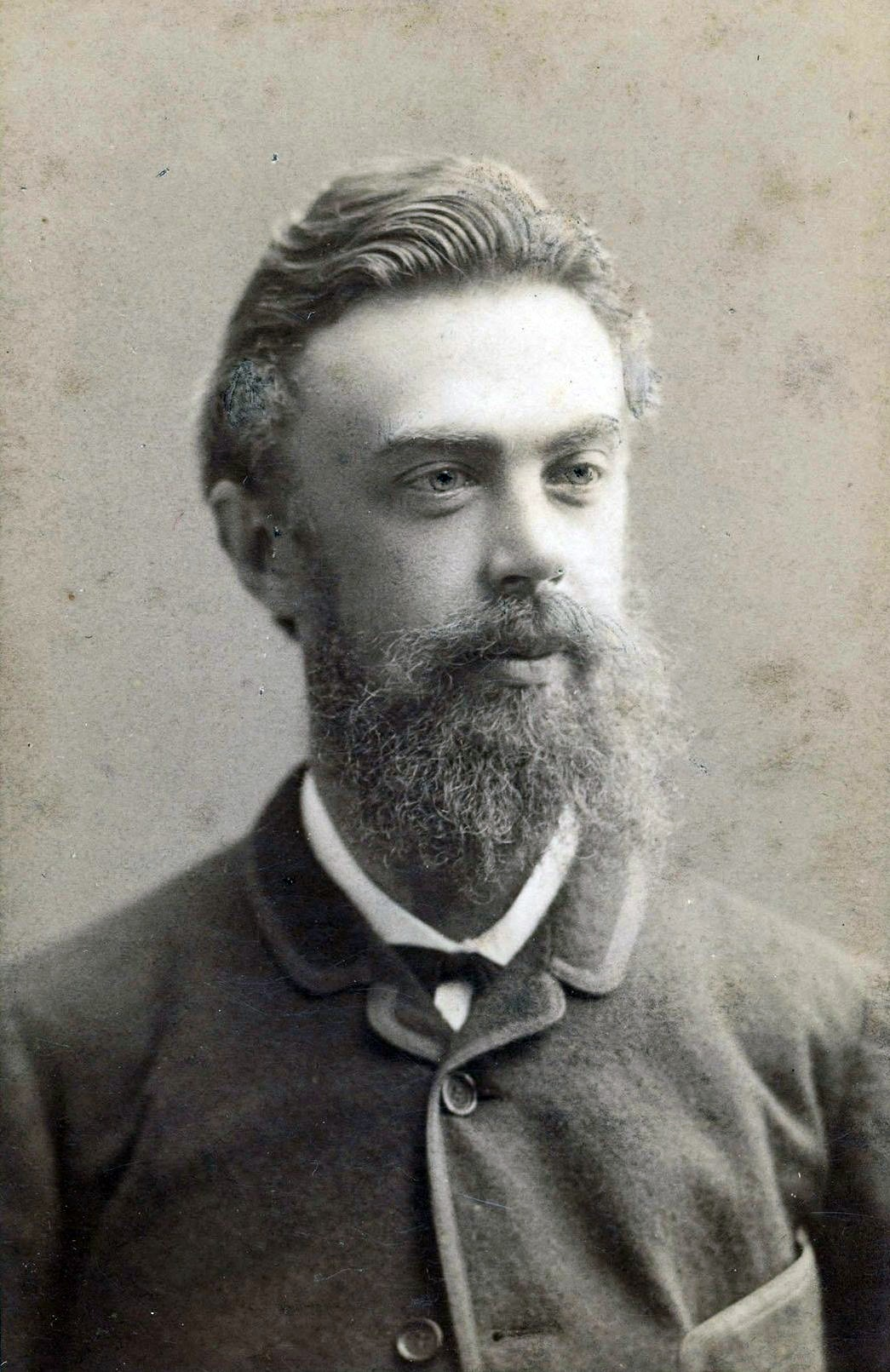
- Naumenko, c. 1880s

President of the Central Council of Ukraine (acting)
- In office 17 March 1917 – 28 March 1917
- Preceded by: Position established
- Succeeded by: Mykhailo Hrushevsky

Personal details
- Born: 19 July 1852 Novgorod-Seversky, Chernigov Governorate, Russian Empire (now Novhorod-Siverskyi, Chernihiv Oblast, Ukraine)
- Died: 8 July 1919 (aged 66) Kyiv, Ukrainian SSR
- Party: Constitutional Democratic Party
- Education: Kiev University
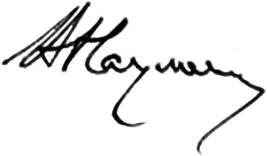
- Signature

Volodymyr Pavlovych Naumenko (Ukrainian: Володимир Павлович Науменко; 19 July 1852 – 8 July 1919) was a Ukrainian pedagogue, public figure and publicist. From 1893 to 1906, he was the chief editor of the monthly historical magazine Kievskaia starina (Kyivan Past). Naumenko served as deputy head of the Central Council of Ukraine, acting as its chairman until Mykhailo Hrushevsky returned from his exile, and was later appointed minister of education. He was executed by the Cheka for "counter-revolutionary activity".

== Early life and family ==
Volodymyr Naumenko was born on 19 July 1852 in Novhorod-Siverskyi to a family of educators. His father Pavlo Osypovych Naumenko was the director of a gymnasium. About his family tree Naumenko wrote the following:

My family tree I know vaguely. I only know that my grandpa, whom I never saw [...], was an extremely talented person and sharp politician who served at the county court in Lubny over an extensive period of time as a secretary.

Naumenko spent his childhood in Novhorod-Siverskyi and Bila Tserkva. In 1861 he mved to Kyiv. In 1868 Naumenko graduated from the 2nd Kyiv Gymnasium where he studied with his good friend Oleksandr Rusov. Naumenko also met with his father's friend Mykhaylo Maksymovych. From 12 September 1869 to 31 May 1873 Naumenko studied at the Department of History and Philology of Kiev University. After that he worked as an intern at his native 2nd gymnasium. Naumenko later taught at several gymnasiums, Cadet Corps and Pavlo Galagan College in Kyiv.

== Early public activities ==
On 18 October 1874 Naumenko married Vira Mykolaivna Shulhina, an aunt of Oleksander Shulhyn. At that time she graduated from the Kyiv Institute of noble girls. About same time Naumenko became a member of the Hromada secret society. Since 1875 he was its treasurer. In 1876 Naumenko joined a group of the society's members, who, following the publication of Ems Ukaz, adopted a decision to move their activities abroad. Starting from the 1890s, he was a member of Kyiv Literacy Society. Since the 1900s Naumenko practically headed the Old Hromada and was a member of the Southwestern Department of Russian Geographic Society that was created in 1873 on the initiative the organization's members. In 1906-10 he participated in the activities of Prosvita. In 1902 Naumenko acquired the plot of land where Taras Shevchenko was buried and put on himself the responsibility of keeping it in order. He also served as a member of a commission of the Russian Academy of Sciences headed by Aleksey Shakhmatov, and participated in a delegation which achieved the removal of government bans against the Ukrainian press.

== Publicist ==
From 1893 to 1906 Naumenko was the chief editor of historic-ethnographic and literary monthly magazine Kievskaia starina (Russian: Кіевская старина). He authored of 115 its articles. During the times of Naumenko, Kievskaia starina transformed from a pure popular science publishing to a representative body of Ukrainophilia, on pages of which was unfolding a struggle for free development of the Ukrainian literature. It also published articles describing the political situation in Eastern Ukraine, Galicia and Bukovina.

In the magazine were published articles that upheld the right of Ukrainian people on their own language. At the end of 1890 the magazine became participant of discussion about independence of the Ukrainian language and literature and about their place among other Slavic languages. There is a famous polemic that Naumenko conducted it on pages of the magazine with Timofey Florinskiy who refused to recognize Ukrainian as a separate language rather than a Little-Russian dialect. It was in result of the active efforts of Naumenko that the magazine in 1898 received a permission on publication of fiction in Ukrainian language and creation of Ukrainian printshop; two years later there was opened a bookstore of Kievskaia starina.

The journalistic activity of Naumenko was tied and with other periodicals: at the end of 1870 - start of 1880 he worked with the newspaper "Labor" (Russian: Труд), in 1898 took part in creation of newspaper "Kyiv responses" (Russian: Киевские отклики), in 1905-06 along with I.Luchytsky he established the newspaper "Liberty and right" (Russian: Свобода та право), a publishing body of the Kyiv Committee of Constitutional Democratic Party. At the end of 1906 he attained a certificate on the right to publish in Kyiv the magazine Ukraine (Ukrainian: Україна) which had to become successor of Kievskaia starina, however the publication was terminated already at the end of 1907.

== Pedagogical activity ==
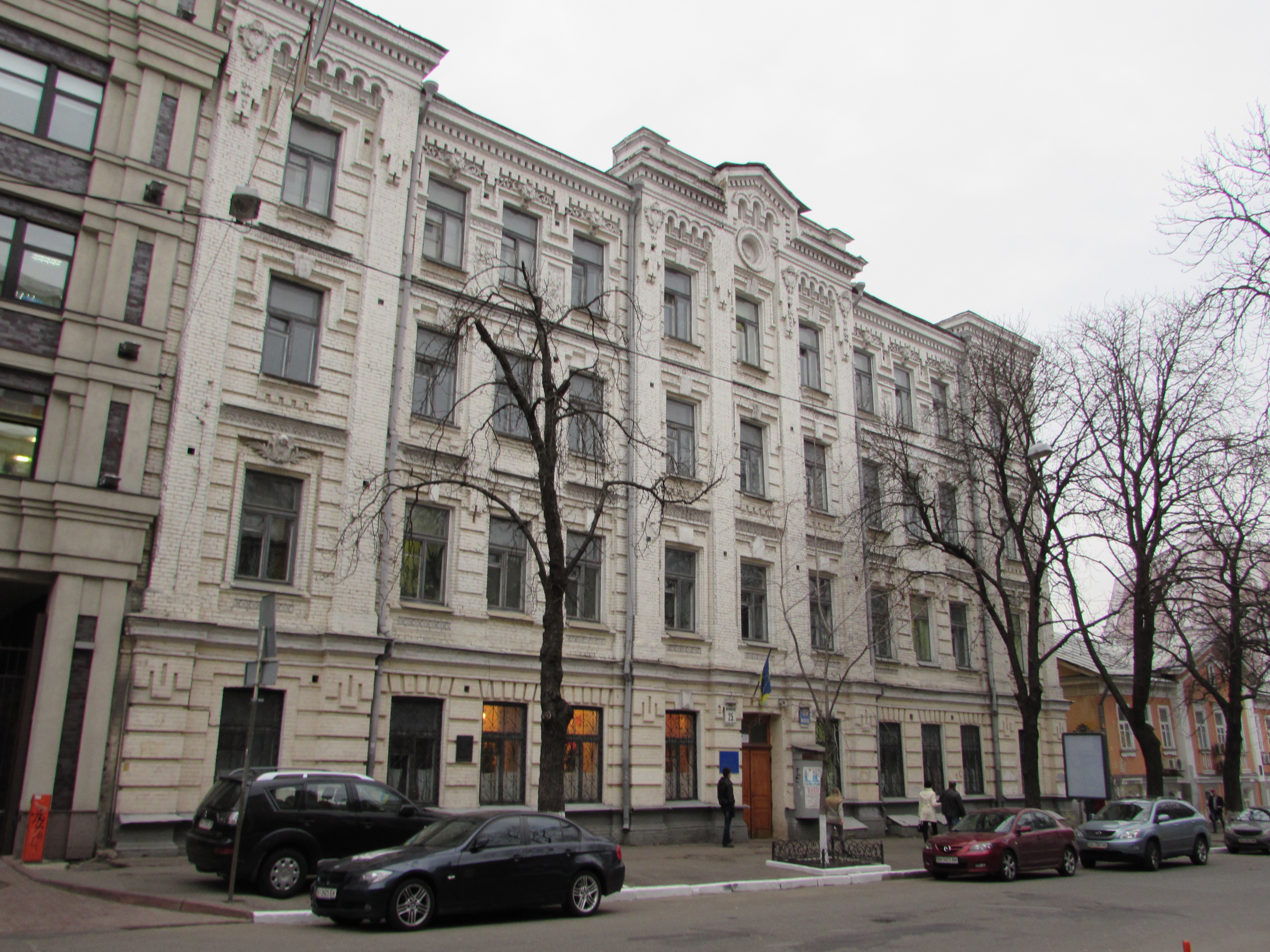
Former building of Naumenko's gymnasium in Kyiv, now an arts school

For many years Volodymyr Naumenko was a teacher of gymnasium teaching literature in the 2nd Kyiv Gymnasium (1880), the State Female Gymnasium of St. Olga (1883), Collegiate of Pavel Galagan, Kyiv Funduklei Gymnasium (1889), Vladimir Cadet Corps (1893). For his work he received multiple awards such as the Order of St Anna (IV, 1883), Order of St Stanislaus (II, 1886), Order of St Ana (II, 1893), Order of St Vladimir (IV, 1897). On 28 February 1898 Naumenko was granted a title of Merited Teacher.

Volodymyr Naumenko contributed to Ukrainian Pedagogy as a teacher, a methodologist and a theoretician. He received and accepted invitations from various regional governments to head teacher summer courses almost annually. Naumenko systematically conducted methodic classes with pedagogues of the Sunday school of the Kyiv Grammar Society, serving as its chairman in 1897-1907. For many years, he was invited to check the knowledge of pupils at Kyiv orphanages. Through these kinds of examinations, Naumenko established classes for students, teachers and educators.

In the Vernadsky Institute of manuscripts are preserved the text of lectures from different years that Volodymyr Naumenko read to teachers of people's schools. He constantly was expressing his conviction that the most effective school education may exist only when it is conducted in the native language.

The most normal schooling is possible in those conditions when it is conducted in the native language... Native language of children should not be neglected, children have no right disrespect the language of father and mother.

In 1905 Naumenko established his own private gymnasium in Kyiv. Among its alumni was the famous Ukrainian poet Maksym Rylsky.

== Scientific works ==
Naumenko was an author of several works on Ukrainian grammar. In addition, he engaged in ethnographic studies and published critical works dedicated to historical works of Ukrainian literature, including the Tale of Igor's Campaign, as well as writings by Ivan Kotliarevsky, Taras Shevchenko, Leonid Hlibov and other authors. In 1897 Naumenko co-authored a dictionary of Ukrainian language, which was later reworked by Borys Hrinchenko.

Naumenko served as the deputy of prominent historian Mykhailo Hrushevsky following his election as head of the Ukrainian Scientific Society. In 1913 Naumenko gifted his private library to the society. During his last years he was a member of the orthographic commission created by the government of the Ukrainian People's Republic, which was tasked with developing basic rules of Ukrainian orthography.

== Participation in government ==
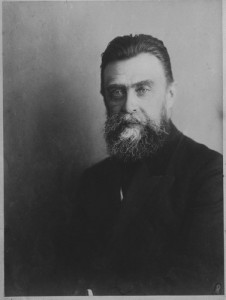
Naumenko around 1900

After the creation of Central Rada, Naumenko served as the deputy of its head Mykhailo Hrushevsky, and led the organization during the latter's absence. On that post Naumenko realized the program of Ukrainization in education, and served as the curator of Kyiv educational district. He opposed the removal of Russian scientists and intelligentsia from that process, and promoted federalist views, criticizing pro-independence activists such as Ivan Ohienko. In late 1918 Naumenko was appointed minister of education in the government of Pavlo Skoropadsky. On that position he actively participated in the establishment of the Ukrainian Academy of Sciences and appointed Volodymyr Vernadsky as its head.

As minister, Naumenko opposed the mobilization of high school pupils and boy scouts into the army. Following the establishment of the Directorate and following occupation by the Bolsheviks, he continued to work in the structure of the Academy of Sciences.

== Death ==
On 7 July 1919 Naumenko was arrested by a Bolshevik patrol. On the next day he was executed by firing squad on accusation of "counterrevolutionary activities". A letter in Naumenko's defence was sent to the Bolshevik-controlled education ministry by Vernadsky and Ahatanhel Krymsky, but it arrived to the recipient on the next day after the scientist's execution.
