= Oleksander Shulhyn =

Ukrainian politician, academic, and diplomat (1889–1960)

- Олександр Шульгин
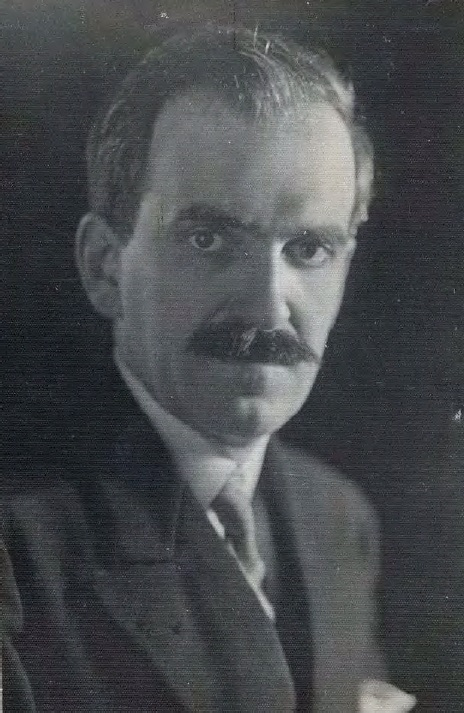
- Shulhyn in 1930s

Secretary of International Affairs
- In office 17 July 1917 – 31 January 1918
- Prime Minister: Volodymyr Vynnychenko
- Preceded by: Serhiy Yefremov
- Succeeded by: Vsevolod Holubovych

Ukraine Ambassador to Bulgaria
- In office July 1918 – December 1918
- Hetman: Pavlo Skoropadskyi
- Preceded by: Position established
- Succeeded by: Fedir Shulha

Minister of Foreign Affairs (in exile)
- In office 1926–1936
- Prime Minister: Vyacheslav Prokopovych
- In office 1939–1940
- Prime Minister: Himself
- In office 1945–1946
- Prime Minister: Kost Pankivsky

Personal details
- Born: 30 July 1889 Sofyne, Russian Empire (now Ukraine)
- Died: 4 March 1960 (aged 70) Paris, France
- Party: Ukrainian Party of Socialists-Federalists
- Occupation: Politician, academic, diplomat
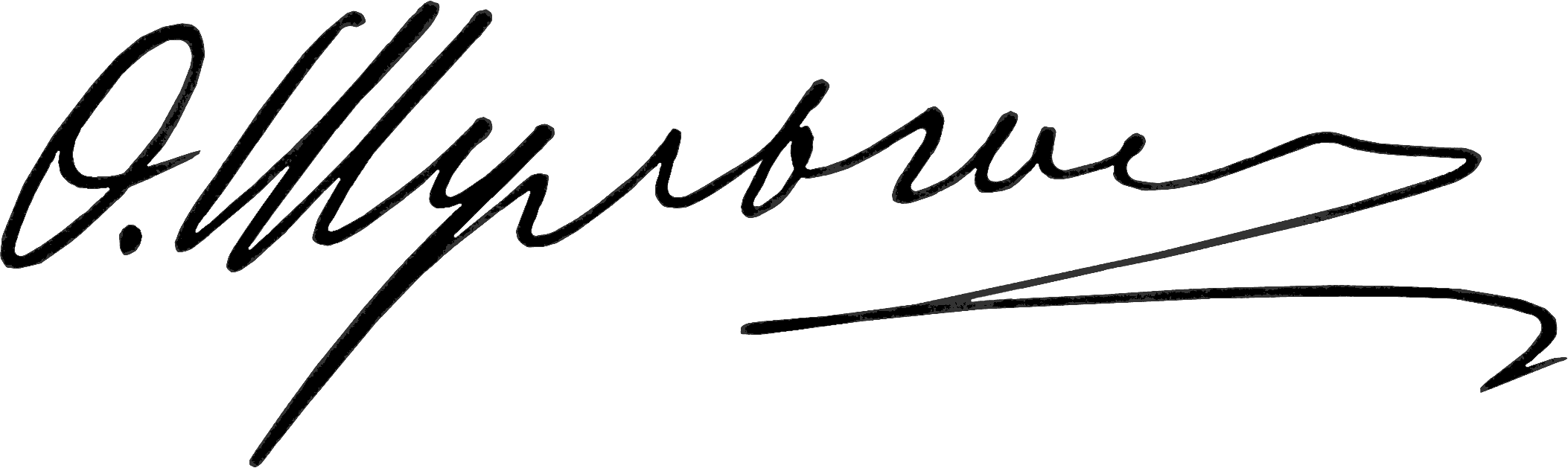
- Signature

Oleksander Yakovych Shulhyn (Note: Ukrainian: Олександр Якович Шульгин; Russian: Александр Яковлевич Шульгин, romanized: Aleksandr Yakovlevich Shulgin; French: Alexandre Choulguine) (30 July [O.S. 18 July] 1889 – 4 March 1960) was a Ukrainian politician, academic, and diplomat who played a key role in establishing the Ministry of Foreign Affairs of Ukraine. He was a member of the Shevchenko Scientific Society, a professor of the Ukrainian Free University in Prague, a member of the Ukrainian delegation at the Paris Peace Conference, 1919 and a representative of Ukrainians in International Refugee Organization after World War II. During World War II (1939–40 and 1945–46) Shulhyn acted as head of the Government of the Ukrainian People's Republic in exile.

== Biography ==
Shulhyn was born in the village of Sofyne (Katsapshchyna), Khorol county in Poltava Governorate (today Andriivka rural hromada in Lubny Raion) in the family of a historian and pedagogue Yakiv Shulhyn whose heritage is traced to the Cossack officers (starshina). He was related to Vasily Shulgin. Oleksander's brother, Volodymyr perished at the Battle of Kruty. Shulhyn initially enrolled at the mathematics-physics department of the Saint Petersburg State University in 1908. In 1910 he transferred to the department of history and philosophy from which Shulhyn graduated in 1915. Later until 1917, he worked at the department as a professor's assistant.

While in Saint Petersburg, Shulhyn joined the Petersburg community of TUP, later switching to the Ukrainian Democratic-Radical Party (later Ukrainian Party of Socialist Federalists). In Petrograd he was a delegate of the Ukrainian National Council at the Petrograd Soviet. During the February Revolution Shulhyn arrived to Kiev joining the Central Council of Ukraine and later its executive committee. From July 1917 through January 30, 1918 he served as a secretary of Inter-ethnic (later Foreign) Affairs. During the time participated in the writing of the Statute of the Higher Administration of Ukraine, and organization of the Congress of peoples of Russia that took place in September 1917 in Kiev.

From July 1918, Shulhyn played a less active role in the government serving for several diplomatic missions of Ukraine in Europe when he was appointed the Ambassador of Ukraine to Bulgaria by the government of the Hetman of Ukraine. In 1919 Shulhyn became a member of the Ukrainian delegation to the Paris Peace Conference, and on 15 November 1920, he headed the Ukrainian delegation at the General Assembly of League of Nations in Geneva. From 1921 Shulhyn headed the Extraordinary diplomatic mission of Ukraine in Paris.

From 1923 to 1927 Shulhyn lived in Paris and was a professor of the Ukrainian Free University and the Ukrainian Higher Pedagogical University of Drahomanov, both in Prague, where he taught history and philosophy. In Prague he revived the Radical-Democratic Party, becoming the head of its Prague committee. In 1926 Shulhyn was appointed the minister of Foreign Affairs of Ukraine in exile, once again leading the Ukrainian foreign policy until 1936. In 1933–38 he headed one of the League of Nations' international unions. Also, from 1929 to 1939 Shulhyn chaired the Main Emigration Council, served as a chief editor of the Paris bi-monthly magazine La Revue de Prométhée (1938–1940) and the Paris weekly magazine Tryzub (1940). During the German occupation of France Shulhyn was jailed in 1940–41.

After World War II in 1946 Shulhyn created the Ukrainian Academic Society in Paris, serving as its chairman until 1960. Also from 1952 to 1960, he was initiator and vice-president of the International Free Academy in Paris, which united the exiled scientists. In 1948–52 Shulhyn represented Ukrainians in the International Refugee Organization, later until 1960 cooperated with the French organization for protection of refugees and stateless at the Ministry of Foreign Affairs of France.

== Publications ==
- L'Ukraine contre Moscou, 1917 ("Ukraine Against Moscow, 1917", 1935) - in French.
