= Jan Tokarzewski-Karaszewicz =

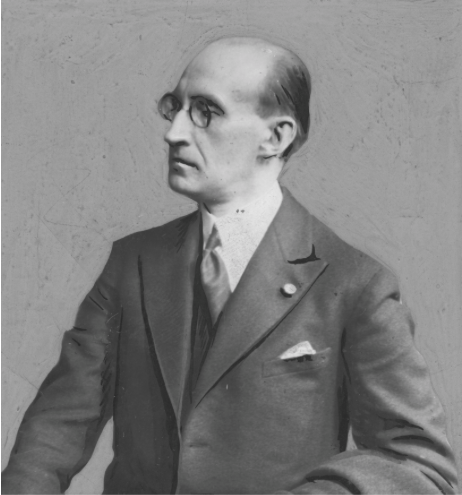
Jan Karaszewicz-Tokarzewski

Jan Tokarzewski-Karaszewicz (Ukrainian: Іван-Степан-Марія Токарже́вський-Караше́вич; 24 June 1885 - 18 November 1954) was a Ukrainian diplomat and heraldist of Polish origins.

== Biography ==
Born into a noble family in the village Chabanivka near Kamianets-Podilskyi, his father was Stefan Tokarzewski-Karaszewicz, and mother was Laura Piotrawin-Janiszewska. He was educated at a gymnasium in Zhytomyr, and graduated from the University of Fribourg before World War I.

From 1918 to 1924, he served as a Ukrainian diplomat in Vienna (1918), Constantinople (Ukrainian ambassador in 1920), Rome, and Tarnov (Deputy Foreign Affairs Minister of Ukrainian People's Republic in exile). From 1924 to 1936, he lived in France, where he was a member of the France-East Committee, and an editor of the La France et l'Ukraine bulletin. Then he lived in Italy (1936 – 1948), and in England (1948 – 1954), where he was a Ukrainian representative of Anti-Bolshevik Bloc of Nations. He was buried in a cemetery in Gunnersbury, a place in the London Borough of Hounslow, in 1954, and finally his relics were transferred to a pantheon of Ukrainian historical figures at South Bound Brook, New Jersey in 1978.

Polish general Michał Tokarzewski-Karaszewicz was a member of the same family. Tokarzewski was married to Oksana Lototsky, a daughter of another diplomat Oleksander Lototsky. Tokarzewski's sister Helena married lawyer Jan Paweł Gromnicki, who also served in Polish army during Polish-Ukrainian and Polish-Soviet war.
