= Mikhail Yuzefovich =

Mikhail Vladimirovich Yuzefovich
- Михаил Владимирович Юзефович
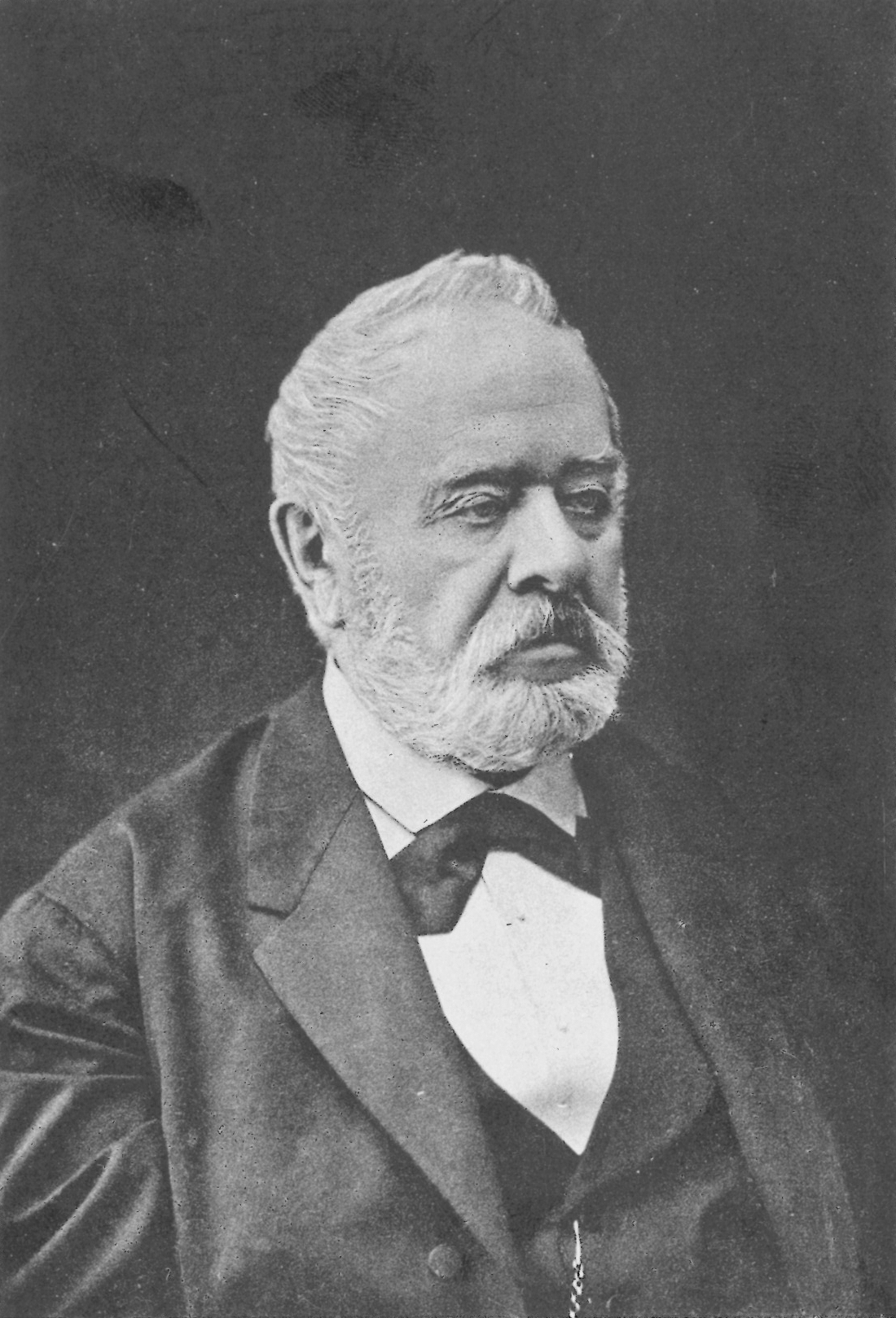
- Mikhail Yuzefovich in 1889
- Born: June 29, 1802; Poltava Governorate
- Died: June 2, 1889 (aged 86); Kyiv
- Occupation: Politician

Mikhail Vladimirovich Yuzefovich (Russian: Михаил Владимирович Юзефович) (29 June 1802 – 2 June 1889) was the deputy commissioner of the Kiev school district, chairman of the Kiev archaeological commission, and instigator of the Ems Ukaz that severely restricted the use of Ukrainian language.

Yuzefovich was known for his extreme Russian nationalist views and fierce opposition to the revival of the Ukrainian culture and language. In his 1876 report to the Russian government "On the so-called Ukrainophile movement", he characterised Ukrainian language societies as subversive and claimed they were organised by Polish and Austrian enemies of Russia. Yuzefovich's recommendations were incorporated in the Ems Ukaz, which was signed on 30 May 1876 by the Russian tsar Alexander II in the town of Bad Ems, Germany. This Ukaz also became known as the "Yuzefovich Ukaz". Taras Shevchenko called Yuzefovich 'traitor'.

Yuzefovich was born to a noble Polonized family in Brest. His ancestors were members of the Polish-Lithuanian Commonwealth Registered Cossacks. Yuzefovich was born in Pyriatyn county of the Poltava Governorate (today in Boryspil Raion) and was homeschooled. In 1819 he graduated the Moscow University Noble Boarding School (Russian: Московский университетский благородный пансион) receiving the 14th rank of state service (see Table of Ranks).

His military service Yuzefovich started as junker at the Chuguev Uhlan Regiment (Russian: Чугуевский 11-й уланский полк) commanded by his uncle Dmitriy Yuzefovich (Russian: Дмитрий Юзефович), a Russian hero of the 1812 Patriotic War. In 1822 Mikhail Yuzefovich was promoted to the rank of cornet. Since 1826 he served at Caucasus region and as a poruchik took part in the 1828–1829 Russo-Turkish War. Yuzefovich had been distinguished at the 1828 Siege of Kars and the 1829 battle of Bayburt (both in northeast Anatolia Region). In 1830 the Yuzefovich's regiment was transferred to a garrison service and rerouted to extinguish the 1830-1831 Polish Uprising. In 1836 he resigned due to health in rank of major.

He also was in acquaintance with Russian poet Pushkin.

Since 1840 he worked for the Ministry of National Enlightenment of the Russian Empire as an inspector of budget schools in the Kiev Educational District and took part in creation of public student quarters at the district's gymnasiums. In 1843 Yuzefovich was granted the rank of court councilor (the 7th in table of ranks) and appointed an acting deputy trustee of the Kiev Educational District (confirmed in 1845).

== General references ==
- Ems Ukaz. Encyclopedia of Ukraine
- Mikhail Yuzefovich. Encyclopedia of Ukraine
- Mykhailo Yuzefovych. Encyclopedia of History of Ukraine.
