= Yevhen Chykalenko =

Ukrainian writer, philanthropist, publisher

- Євген Чикаленко
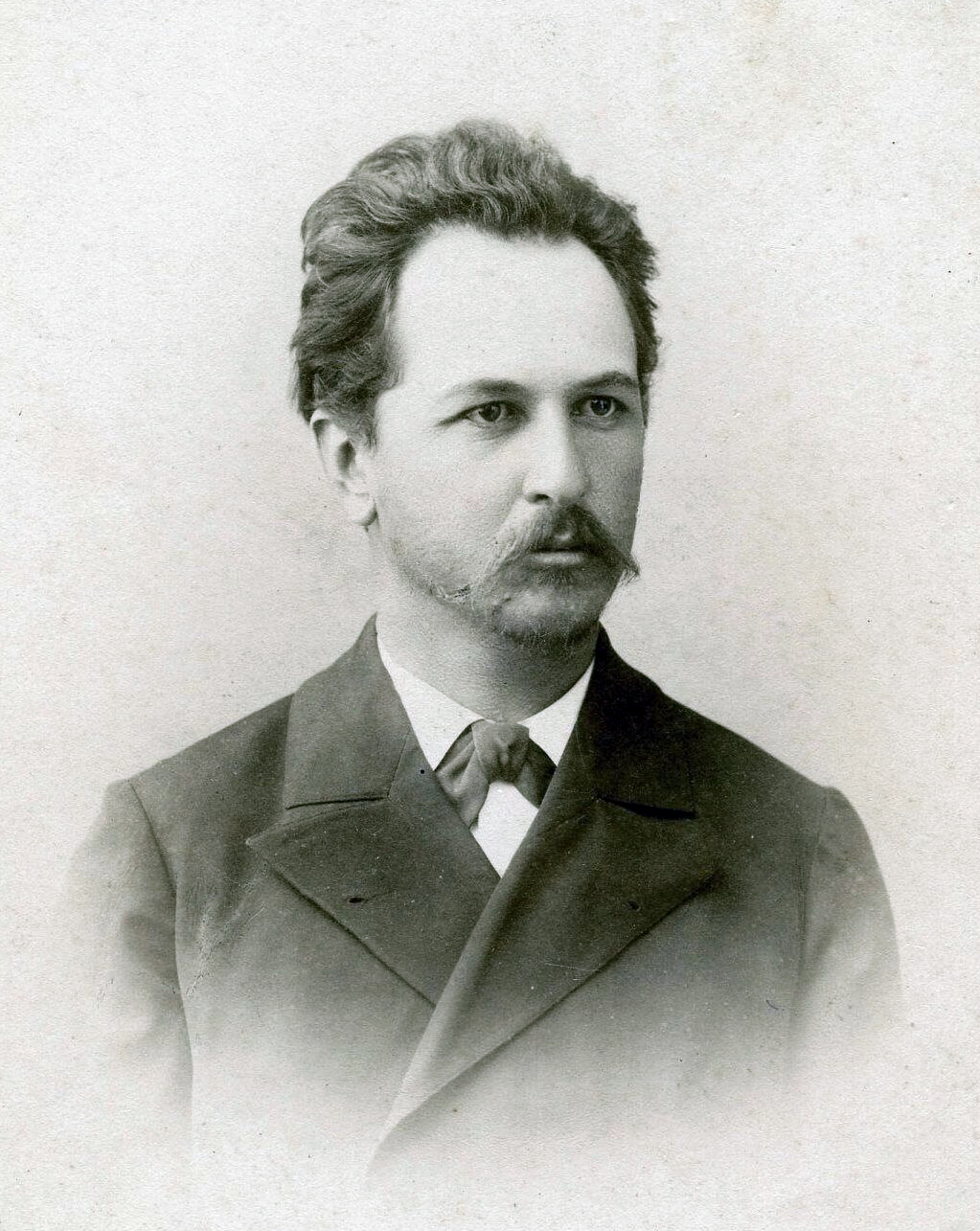
- Chykalenko in 1897
- Born: 21 December 1861; Pereshory, Russian Empire (now in Ukraine)
- Died: 20 June 1929 (aged 67); Prague, Czechoslovakia
- Occupations: Public figure, philanthropist, landowner, publisher, patron of the arts
- Known for: Initiator of the convocation of the Central Rada, Ukrainian national revival

Yevhen Kharlampiyovych Chykalenko (Ukrainian: Євге́н Харла́мпійович Чикале́нко; 21 December 1861 – 20 June 1929) was a Ukrainian public figure, philanthropist, landowner, agronome, publisher and patron of the arts. He was one of the initiators of the convocation of the Central Rada in 1917. He played an important role in the Ukrainian national revival in the early 20th century by co-funding the only Ukrainian-language newspapers in the Russian Empire.

== Biography ==
Yevhen Chykalenko was born in the village of Pereshory in Kherson Governorate (modern-day Odesa Oblast). He studied at a gymnasium in Yelisavetgrad, where his classmates were prominent Ukrainian cultural figures: Panas Tobilevych (later known by the pseudonym Saksahansky) and Oleksandr Tarkovskyi, grandfather of Andrey Tarkovsky. Chykalenko's sister Nadiya married Ukrainian playwright Ivan Karpenko-Karyi.

Chykalenko received higher education at the department of natural sciences at Kharkiv University, where he took part in the Ukrainian student hromada inspired by the ideas of Mykhailo Drahomanov. In 1884 he was arrested for his activities in the student movement and exiled back to his native village of Pereshory. There he managed his family's manor, and in 1897 published a book of practical advice on agricultural topics. From 1894 Chykalenko lived in Odesa, and in 1900 moved to Kyiv. After selling his manor in Pereshory, he bought a land plot in the village of Kononivka not far from the Ukrainian capital, and organized there a summer residence which was visited by several Ukrainian authors, most notably his close friend Mykhailo Kotsiubynsky.

Starting from 1900, Chykalenko was an active member of "Old Hromada" and the General Non-Partisan Democratic Organization. In 1904 he entered the Ukrainian Democratic Party (since 1905 - Ukrainian Democratic Radical Party). In 1908 Chykalenko initiated the establishment of the Union of Ukrainian Progressives, and in the following years served as its unofficial head. After the beginning of the First World War he had to flee to Finland due to persecution by Russian police, and later lived in Moscow and Petrograd. After the February Revolution in 1917 Chykalenko returned to Kyiv and became one of the initiators of the creation of Ukrainian Central Rada, but soon retired from politics due to his conservative views. In January 1919 he moved to Galicia, where he was later interned by Polish troops. From 1920 Chykalenko lived in Austria, and in 1925 was employed by the Ukrainian Husbandry Academy in Poděbrady.

== Cultural and political activities ==
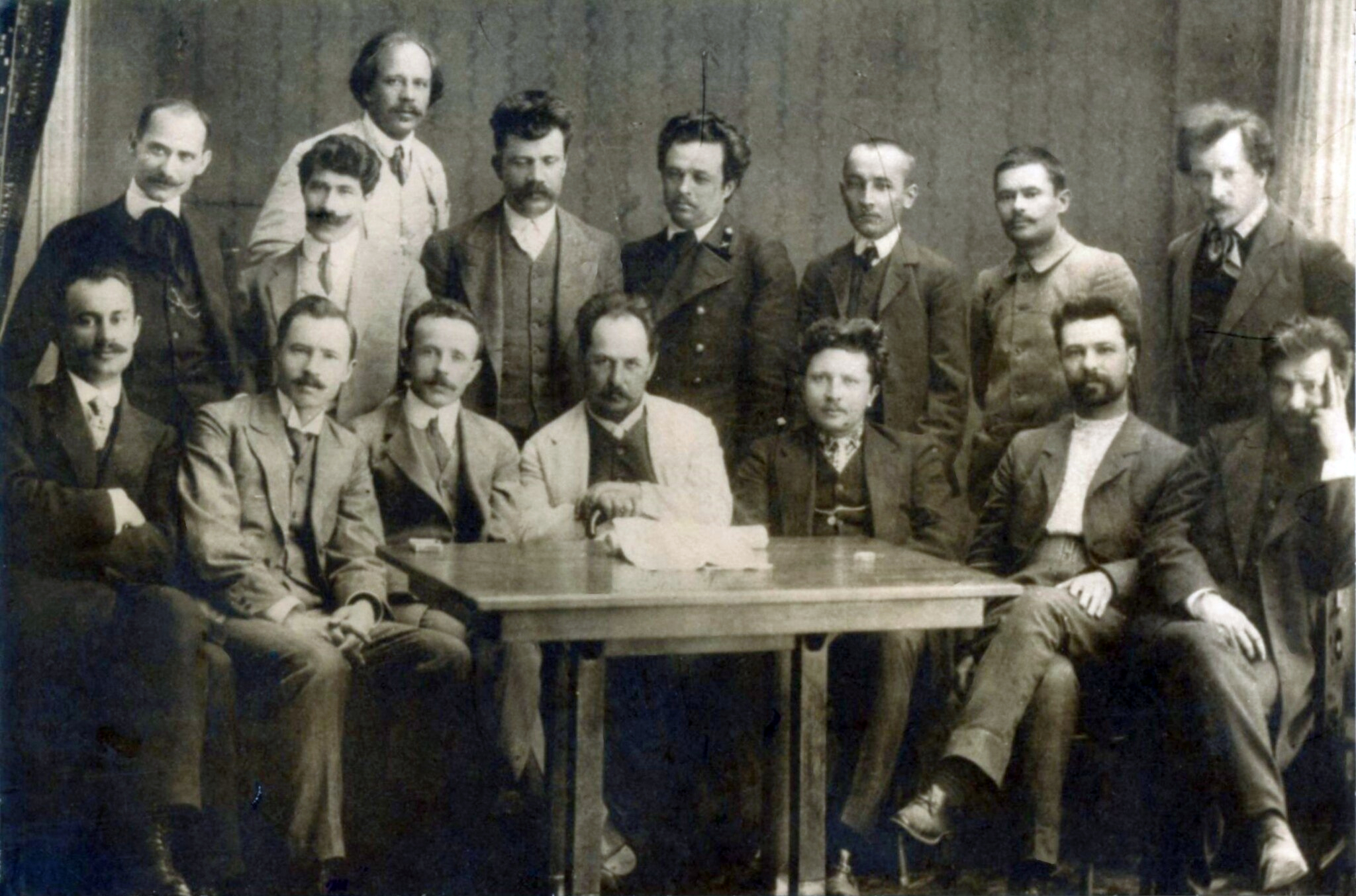
Chykalenko (seated in the middle) among the editors of Rada newspaper, 1908

Chykalenko was a patron of various causes, donating his own money for publication of numerous books, such as Umanets-Komarov's Russian-Ukrainian Dictionary (Lviv, 1893–1898). He helped the Kievskaia starina magazine by giving an award of 1,000 rubles for the best written history of Ukraine and paying royalties for Ukrainian works of literature. Chykalenko organized the Mordovets Foundation at the Shevchenko Scientific Society in Lviv to help Ukrainian writers, financed the Revolutionary Ukrainian Party's "Selyanyn" weekly publication, and became the main founder of the "Academic House" in Lviv (25,000 rubles), encouraging young people from Dnieper Ukraine to go to the city for studies.

After the Russian Revolution of 1905 Chykalenko founded the first Ukrainian-language periodicals in Dnieper Ukraine: Hromadska Dumka (1906) and Rada (1906-1914), whose publication was supported by Vasyl Symyrenko and Leonid Zhebuniov. Chykalenko financed the Kyiv Society of Aid to Science, Literature and Arts, which provided material support to Ukrainian cultural figures including Mykhailo Kotsiubynskyi, Volodymyr Vynnychenko, Lesia Ukrainka, Olha Kobylianska, Oleksandr Oles, Mykola Lysenko and others. With the support of Chykalenko and under the informal leadership of Volodymyr Naumenko, the Kyiv hromada managed to publish the Dictionary of Ukrainian Language by Borys Hrinchenko. The organization also took part in the commemoration of Taras Shevchenko on the centenary of his birth in 1914, despite strong opposition from Russian authorities, and financed the establishment of Kyiv Prosvita with the support of count Michał Tyszkiewicz.

During his time in the Central Rada, Chykalenko was an advocate for the inclusion of the Jewish population into the Ukrainian national movement. Chykalenko would often pursue pro-Jewish rhetoric with his colleagues and highlight the fact that a large portion of the Jewish population could communicate in the Ukrainian language prior to the Russian Empire's policies of "russification" in an attempt to ease tensions.

== Legacy ==
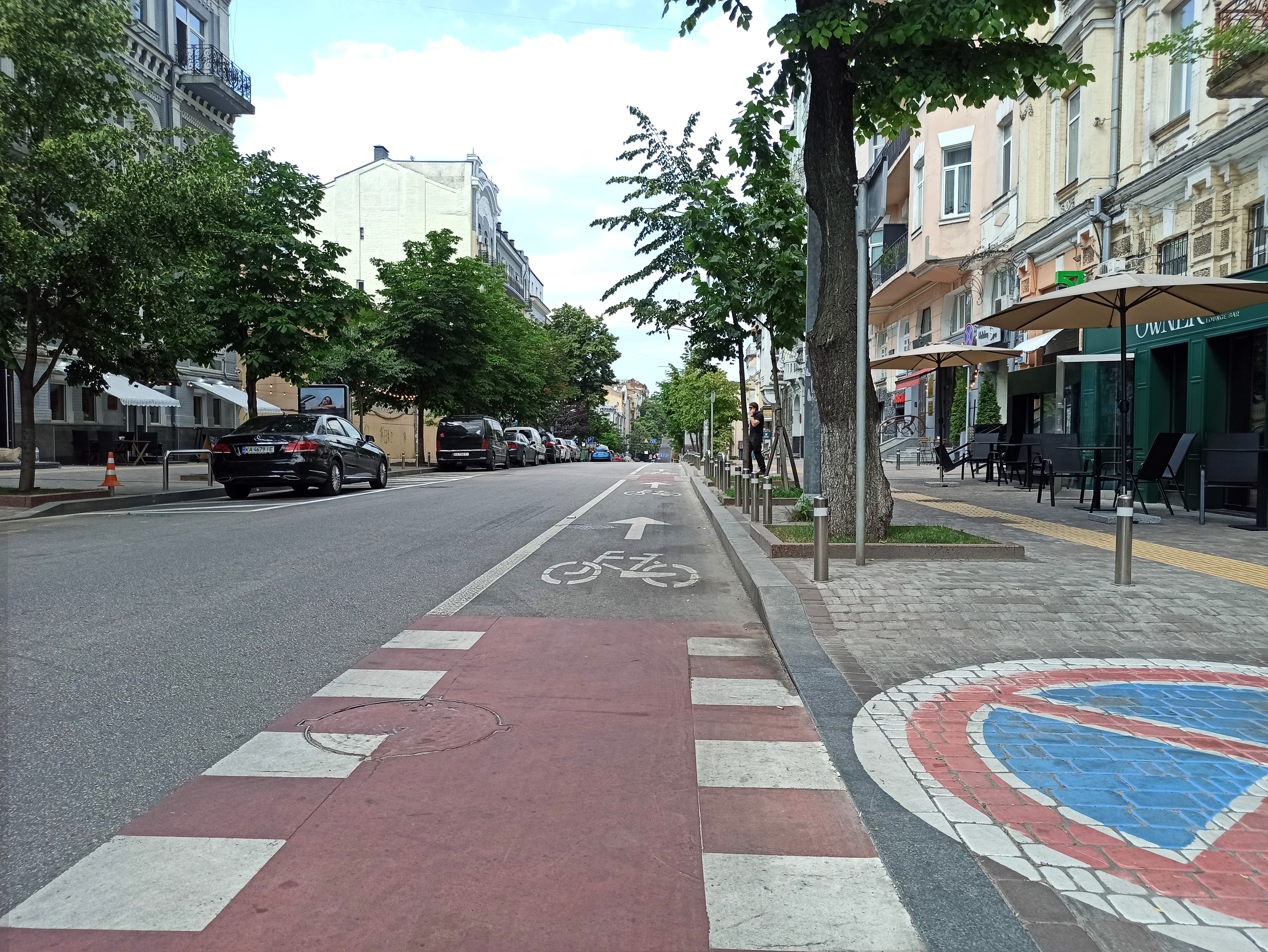
Chykalenko Street in Kyiv

Chykalenko's memoirs (published in 1925-1926), as well as his diary (1931) represent an important source on the history of the Ukrainian national movement in the late 19th and early 20th centuries.

Following the Russian invasion of Ukraine, Pushkin Street in Kyiv was renamed in honour of Yevhen Chykalenko.

== See also ==
- Demolition of monuments to Alexander Pushkin in Ukraine
