= Sociology in Russia =

Sociology in Russia has developed since the beginning of the 20th century, despite an official ban on sociology in the Soviet Union from 1929 to 1956 and the dominance until recently of Marxist sociology. Despite sharp divisions since the breakup of the Soviet Union, the field of sociology in Russia now includes over 300 university departments, approximately 30 academic journals and several professional associations.

== History ==
The first sociological thinkers in the Russian Empire were significantly influenced by utopian thought. The first Department of Sociology in Russia was opened in 1907, at the Psychoneurological Institute, and was headed by Maksim Kovalevsky and E.V. De Roberti. Other Russian sociologists of that period included Nikolay Danilevsky, Nikolay Mikhaylovsky, Mikhail Tugan-Baranovsky and S.N. Yuzhakov.

After the Russian Revolution, sociology at first continued to thrive, with notable works by Pitirim Sorokin, Konstantin Takhtarev and Nikolai Bukharin, who was a major representative of the shift towards Marxism. After about a decade of relatively free research, sociology was gradually "politicized, Bolshevisized and eventually, Stalinized". Pitirim Sorokin was expelled from Russia in 1922, and K.M. Takhtarev' lectures at the university were banned in 1924. Sociology was declared to be "bourgeois pseudo-science" in direct opposition to Marxism, and its practice – and the very name – were banned. A 1929 ruling from the Institute of Philosophy of the Communist Academy for Problems of Philosophy and Sociology declared that "sociology is a false science concocted by the French reactionary August Compte [sic?], and the word itself sociology is not to be used in Marxist literature". Subsequently, from 1930s to 1950s, the discipline virtually ceased to exist in the Soviet Union. During the period when sociology was banned, its de facto replacement was "Historical Materialism" which was a component of Marxist theory. Even in the era when its practice was allowed, and not replaced by Marxist philosophy, it was always dominated by Marxist thought; hence sociology in the Soviet Union and the entire Eastern Bloc represented, to a significant extent, only one branch of sociology: Marxist sociology.

With the death of Joseph Stalin and the 20th Party Congress in 1956, restrictions on sociological research were somewhat eased; the formation of the Soviet Sociological Association was allowed in 1957; and finally, after the 23rd Party Congress in 1966, sociology in the Soviet Union was again officially recognized as an acceptable branch of science. 1962 saw the establishment of the first Russian English-language journal in the field, Soviet Sociology. In 1968 an Institute for Concrete Social Research (later renamed the Institute of Sociology) was created at the Soviet Academy of Sciences where Yuri Levada, founder of the Levada Center, attracted a small group of followers.

== Present day ==
Even throughout the Soviet period, there was a major split among Russian sociologists on whether to focus on Marxist-Leninist sociology (see also Soviet Marxism) or the more general sociology of science. The Marxist-Leninist approach, often supported by the Party, usually triumphed – until the fall of the Soviet Union. Since then, lacking institutional support, it has begun to lose its dominant status, leading to increasingly visible splits and conflicts within Russian sociology. According to Romanovsky and Toshchenko, sociologists in Russia have since broadened their study, in terms of both topics and geography.

In 2009 D. G. Podvoiskii noted that "in today’s Russian society, the status of sociology is extremely low", noting that neither the general public nor policymakers know much about sociology, nor do they care for sociologists' input. In 2012, Russian sociologist Victor Vakhshtayn published an article in which he argued that Russian sociology is in crisis, and in the process of reinventing itself. Russian sociologists N.V. Romanovsky, Alfredo Gotsky and Zhan Toshchenko countered with a less pessimistic view of sociology in Russia. They note that the largest problem facing Russian sociology is the existence of poorly educated "pseudo-sociologists" who nonetheless grab the attention of media and politicians with their poorly researched claims.

As of 2012, Russia has over 300 university departments of sociology, with about 110 conferring sociology degrees. Between 1989 and 2003, 20,000 students graduated from departments of sociology in the country. Major sociological conferences in Russia are the All-Russia Sociological Congress and Russian Pathways. The Russian Society of Sociologists was founded in 1999, although according to G. V. Osipov, as of 2009, there were several alternate organizations (such as the Society of Sociologists and Demographers, the Kovalevskii Sociological Society and the Society of Professional Sociologists,), and it is not clear what is the proper successor to the Soviet Sociological Association (disbanded in 1999). Two major centers of sociological research are the Institute of Sociology and the Institute of Sociopolitical Research, both at the Russian Academy of Sciences. The M. Kovalevskii Prize is the most prestigious modern Russian award for sociological research. There are about 30 sociology journals published in Russia, two of which are published in English: Sociological Research and Society and Education. Between 1998 and 2006 more than 1,000 sociological books and monographs, including several dictionaries and encyclopedias of sociology, were published in Russia.

== See also ==
- History of sociology
