= Ukrainian Democratic Party =

Defunct Ukrainian political party

The Ukrainian Democratic Party (Ukrainian: Українська демократична партія, romanized: Ukrayinska demokratychna partiya; UDP) was a Ukrainian party that existed in Kyiv since 1897 first as the clandestine General Ukrainian Nonpartisan Democratic Organization that grew into a political party just before the 1905 Russian Revolution. It was formed out of the already existing wider community organization network known as Hromada (Community) that existed since 1859, and the Taras Student Fraternity, a more direct student organization of 1891.

== Name changes ==
Some of these are simply name changes while others are dissolution and creation of a new organisation with a significant number of members of the old.

- General Ukrainian Unaffiliated Democratic Organization (1897–1904)
- Ukrainian Democratic Party (1904–1905)
  - Ukrainian Radical Party (1904–1905)
- Ukrainian Democratic Radical Party (1905–1908)
- Society of Ukrainian Progressivists (1908–1917)
- Ukrainian Party of Socialists-Federalists (1917–1923)
- Ukrainian Radical Democratic Party (1923–1939)

== History ==
=== General Ukrainian Nonpartisan Democratic Organization ===
The party was formed out of the General Ukrainian Organization, also known as General Ukrainian Nonpartisan Democratic Organization. The organization was formed in Kyiv earlier in 1897 by the Ukrainized Polish political activist Volodymyr Antonovych and the Ukrainian lexicographer Oleksandr Konysky.

That organization united all Hromadas from some twenty cities across the Ukrainian lands. The organization published the magazine Vik, organized the Shevchenko's festivals, and provided political sanctuary for the politically persecuted national activists.

=== First years and split ===
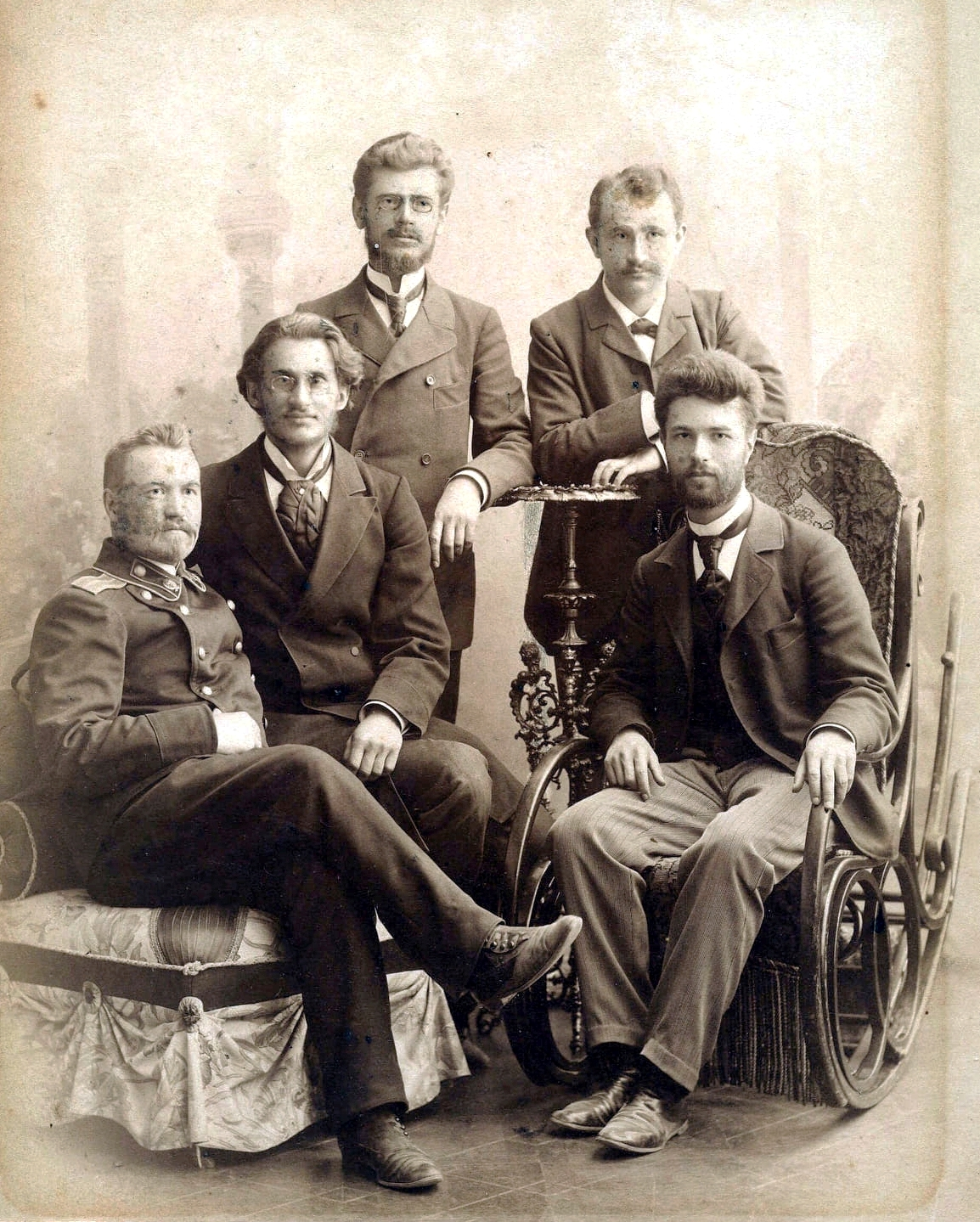
Serhiy Yefremov (lower right) and Fedir Matushevsky (upper left) among a group of Ukrainian publishers, early 1900s

The UDP was seeking liquidation of absolutism in the Russian Empire and the introduction of a constitutional order (similarly to the Russian Kadets). The party also was pursuing an autonomy for the Ukrainian lands with its own regional diet (sejm) and implementation of the Ukrainian language throughout the territory. Among its early leaders were Serhiy Yefremov, Borys Hrinchenko, Yevhen Chykalenko. At the end of 1904 a left-inclined group of its party members split into another political party, the Ukrainian Radical Party. Unlike the democrats, the Ukrainian radicals were for the constitutional monarchy. Among the radicals were the above-mentioned Serhiy Yefremov, Borys Hrinchenko as well as Modest Levytsky, Fedir Matushevsky, and others. The party published its periodicals in Lviv and Saint Petersburg. It did not manage to create much of influence on the local population in Ukraine and in the autumn of 1905 reunited back with democrats into the Ukrainian Democratic Radical Party (UDRP).

=== UDRP ===
The fundamental principals of the party were parliamentarism and federalism: Ukraine had to acquire under the Constitution of Russia a wide degree of autonomy. UDRP also was seeking a compulsory purchase from private owners its land and industries that eventually would be nationalized. The party was represented in the first two convocations of the State Duma of the Russian Empire, where it generally cooperated with the Constitutional Democratic Party. UDRP parliamentarians organized into the Duma's Ukrainian Hromada. During this period the party published its own press media Hromadska Dumka which was a predecessor of the newspaper Rada.

== Successor organizations ==
=== Union of Ukrainian Progressivsts ===
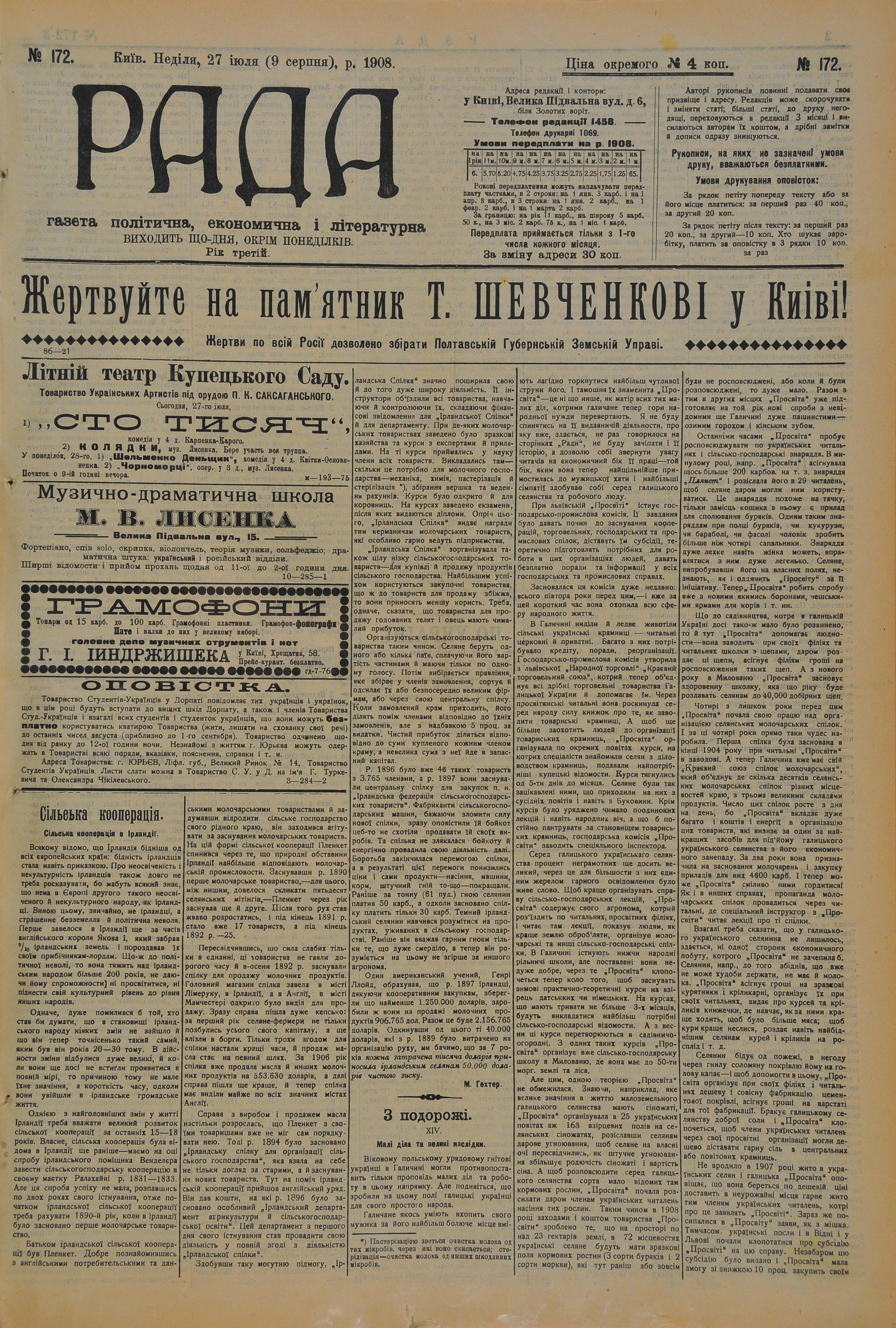
Front page of newspaper Rada, which served as a press organ of the Society

With early dissolution of the Second State Duma and the growing Russian nationalism on the Ukrainian territory (see Pogroms), the party reorganized into the Society of Ukrainian Progressivists (TUP) together with some members of the Ukrainian Social Democratic Labour Party. That group was headed by Chykalenko, Yefremov and Mykhailo Hrushevsky, but was forced to limit itself to cultural activities due to government repressions. The society's council included, among others, Petro Stebnytsky, Symon Petliura, Volodymyr Vynnychenko, Nykyfor Hryhoriiv, Dmytro Doroshenko, Viacheslav Prokopovych, Teodor Shteingel and Liudmyla Starytska-Cherniakhivska. It operated around 60 branches in Ukraine, 2 in Saint Peterburg and one in Moscow.

Among the union's demands was the Ukrainization of schooling, Ukrainian autonomy and recognition of constitutional parliamentarianism. It was a leading organization in the cultural movement of Dnieper Ukraine and coordinated the activities of Prosvita societies. Members of TUP had good relations with Russian opposition politicians in the Duma such as Pavel Milyukov, Nikolay Nekrasov and Viktor Obninsky, as well as with scientists Aleksey Shakhmatov and Sergei Melgunov. After the start of World War I TUP adopted a position of neutrality, opposing the Union for the Liberation of Ukraine. In late 1914 Hrushevsky and a number of other members of the organization were arrested. In January 1917 TUP supported the peace initiatives of Woodrow Wilson, and in March its members were among the founders of Ukrainian Central Rada. At a congress on 7 April 1917 TUP reformed itself into the Ukrainian Union (later Party) of Socialists-Federalists (UPSF).

=== Ukrainian Party of Socialists-Federalists ===
Formed in 1917, the party readopted the program of Ukrainian Democratic Party. Formed mostly of cultural intelligentsia, the organization was moderately socialist and stood on relatively conservative positions, supporting decentralization and establishment of a world federation of nations. The party was headed by Serhiy Yefremov, and during the Central Rada period its members participated in governments of Vynnychenko and Vsevolod Holubovych. During the Hetmanate period its members were involved in the Ukrainian National Union and took part in the second Lyzohub government. The party continued its government presence under the Directorate, and in May 1920 its member Viacheslav Prokopovych headed the cabinet.

=== Ukrainian Radical Democratic Party ===
After emigration, members of UPSF based themselves in Prague, where in 1923 the organization was transformed into the Ukrainian Radical Democratic Party under the leadership of Oleksander Lototsky. That organization existed until World War II and closely cooperated with the Government of the Ukrainian People's Republic in exile. Many of its positions were adopted by the Ukrainian National Democratic Union, which was formed in 1946.

== Notable members ==
- Ivan Ohienko (1882-1973), Ukrainian linguist and religious figure
