= Oleksander Lototsky =

Ukrainian diplomat

Oleksander Lototsky Олекса́ндр Гна́тович Лото́цький
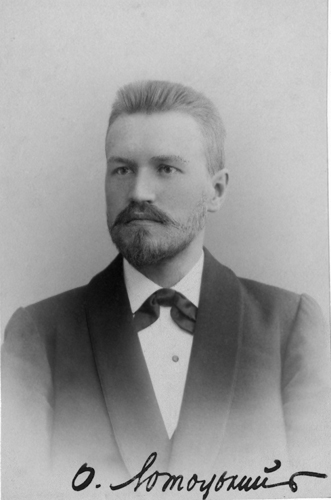

Chancellor
- In office 13 August 1917 – 20 November 1917
- Prime Minister: Volodymyr Vynnychenko
- Preceded by: Pavlo Khrystiuk
- Succeeded by: Ivan Mirnyi (acting)

State Controller
- In office 8 February 1918 – 29 April 1918
- Prime Minister: Vsevolod Holubovych
- Preceded by: Aleksandr Zolotaryov
- Succeeded by: Georgiy Afanasiev

Minister of Confessions
- In office 25 October 1918 – 14 November 1918
- Prime Minister: Fedir Lyzohub
- Preceded by: Vasyl Zenkovsky
- Succeeded by: Mykhailo Voronovych

Ambassador of Ukraine to Turkey
- In office 1919–1920
- President: Symon Petlyura
- Preceded by: Mykhailo Sukovkin
- Succeeded by: Ivan-Stepan Tokarzhevsky

Minister of Internal Affairs
- In office 1927–1930
- Prime Minister: Vyacheslav Prokopovych

Personal details
- Born: 3 September 1870 village of Bronnytsia, Podolia Governorate
- Died: 22 October 1939 (aged 69) Warsaw
- Party: UPSF
- Education: Kiev Theological Academy
- Occupation: diplomat, statesman, public activist

Oleksander Lototsky (Ukrainian: Олекса́ндр Ігна́тович Лото́цький; Russian: Алекса́ндр Игна́тьевич Лото́цкий) was a Ukrainian statesman, diplomat, writer, and scientist. He was a member of the Association of Ukrainian Progressionists (TUP).

== Biography ==
Lototsky graduated from the Kiev Theological Academy in 1896. In 1900-17, he worked in the office of state controller in Kiev and Saint Petersburg. During World War I Lototsky served as a gubernatorial commissar of Bukovina and Pokuttia. In 1917, he also one of organizers of the Ukrainian National Council in Saint Petersburg.

In January 1918 he went to Kiev and was immediately appointed Secretary General (Minister) in the General Secretariat of the Ukrainian Central Rada. In the spring of 1918 he was briefly Minister of State Control in the government of the Ukrainian People's Republic, and in the Ukrainian State he was Minister of Religious Affairs in October/November 1918. As such, he was instrumental in the January 1, 1919 declaration of autocephaly of the Ukrainian Orthodox Church.

On the post of minister, Lototsky was involved in financial irregularities, purchasing 2 million German marks from the State Bank at a lower exchange rate than officially defined by the institution. This led to the loss of 95 million karbovanets for the Ukrainian government. Despite this fact reaching publicity, Lototsky evaded responsibility through entering diplomatic service abroad. In January 1919, he was appointed Ambassador of Ukraine to Turkey, and traveled to Constantinople on a diplomatic mission to obtain recognition of the status of the new church from the Patriarch of Constantinople.

Due to the occupation of Turkey by the Entente and the Bolshevik takeover of Ukraine, he emigrated to Vienna in March 1920 and to Prague in 1922, where he was a lecturer and eventually professor of canon law at the Ukrainian Free University until 1928. From 1929 until his death he was professor of Orthodox Church history at the University of Warsaw.

Between 1930 and 1939 he was director of the Ukrainian Scientific Institute in Warsaw. He also served as Minister of the Interior and Deputy Prime Minister of the Government-in-Exile of the Ukrainian People's Republic from 1927 to 1930.

He died in Warsaw at the age of 69. His ashes were transferred to St. Andrew Cemetery in South Bound Brook, New Jersey, United States, in 1971 and reburied.

Lototsky had a daughter Oksana who married Ivan-Stepan Tokarzhevsky.
