= Dnieper Ukraine =

Historical region in Ukraine

Coordinates: 49.32°N 32.74°E

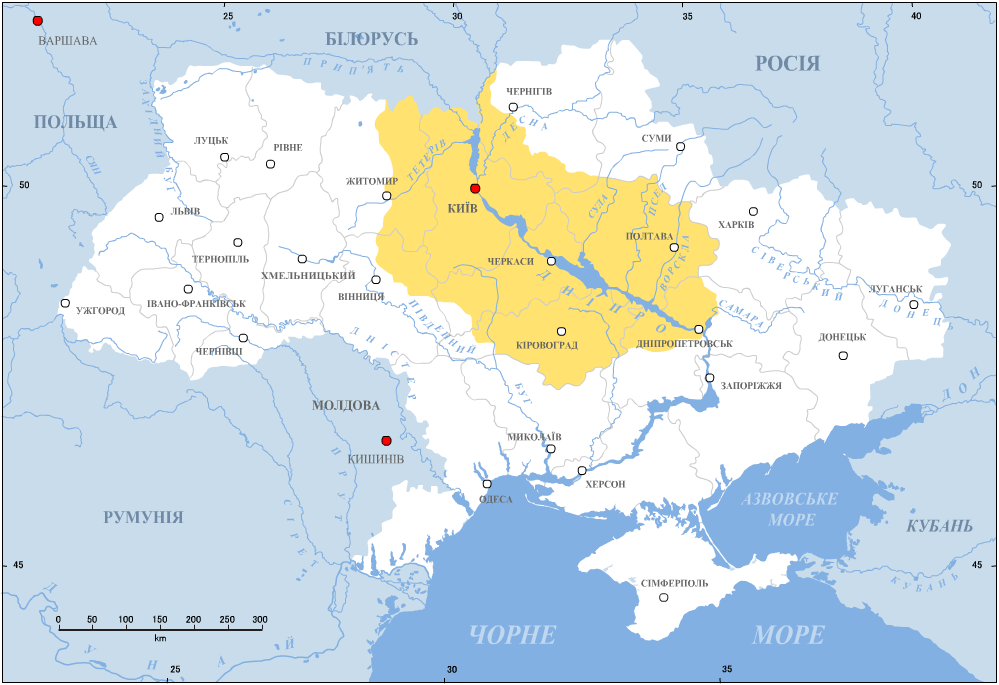
Dnieper Ukraine, 17th–18th centuries

Dnieper Ukraine or Dnipro Ukraine (Ukrainian: Наддніпрянщина, romanized: Naddniprianshchyna, lit. 'over Dnieper land', Ukrainian pronunciation: [nɐdːnʲipˈrʲɑnʃt͡ʃɪnɐ]) is the territory on either side of the middle course of the Dnieper River. The Ukrainian name derives from nad‑ (prefix: "above, over") + Dnipró ("Dnieper") + ‑shchyna (suffix denoting a geographic region). Historically, this region is tightly entwined with the history of Ukraine and is considered as the heart of the country. Due to its size, the region is conditionally subdivided into Upper Dnieper Ukraine, Central Dnieper Ukraine, and Lower Dnieper Ukraine in reference to the Dnieper's direction of flow. Upper and Central Dnieper Ukraine separate at the mouth of Desna River, which is roughly coextensive with the city of Kyiv, while Lower and Central Dnieper Ukraine join up around Khortytsia island within the city of Zaporizhia.

The term Dnieper Ukraine appeared soon after the partitions of Poland when Ukraine as former territory of the Polish–Lithuanian Commonwealth became divided between the Russian Empire and Austrian Empire and was referred to Russian-controlled Ukraine. The term was phased out soon after 1939.

Ukrainians sometimes call it Great Ukraine (Velyka Ukraina). The term is mentioned in the Ukrainian Unification Act (1919) where it says: "From now on into one merge torn away one from other portions of United Ukraine, the West-Ukrainian People's Republic (Galicia, Bukovina, Ugric Ruthenia) and the Dnieper Great Ukraine" (in original: Од нині во-єдино зливаються століттям одірвані одна від одної частини єдиної України – Західно-Українська Народня Республіка (Галичина, Буковина; Угорська Русь) і Наддніпрянська Велика Україна).

There is a regional Museum of Folk Architecture and Way of Life of Central Naddniprianshchyna located in Pereiaslav. This open-air museum contains thirteen themed museums, one hundred twenty-two examples of national architecture, and over thirty thousand historical cultural objects.

== See also ==
- Middle Dnieprian dialect
- Right-bank Ukraine
- Left-bank Ukraine
