= Vitaliy Borovyk =

Ukrainian opinion writer and ethnographer (1864–1937)

Personal details
- Born: Vitaliy Havrylovych Borovyk; 30 October 1864 Nizhyn, Chernigov Governorate, Russian Empire
- Died: 28 December 1937 (aged 73) Odesa, Ukrainian SSR, Soviet Union
- Education: Kyiv University
- Occupation: opinion writer, ethnographer, translator

Vitaliy Havrylovych Borovyk (Ukrainian: Віталій Гаврилович Боровик; October 30, 1864, Nizhyn – December 28, 1937, Odesa) was a Ukrainian opinion writer and ethnographer. His real surname was Borovikov.

Borovyk was born in the city of Nizhyn, Chernigov Governorate. He studied at the Ostroh pre-gymnasium (1876–1880) and then Nizhyn gymnasium (1880–1884). In 1891 (possibly in 1889) Borovyk graduated from the natural department of physical and mathematical faculty of the Kyiv University. In the university introduced by Lesya Ukrainka, he participated in the literary club "Pleyada" where was involved in creation of library of world literature translations.

In the summer of 1891, he assisted the Russian statistician Aleksandr Rusov in a real estate census of the Poltava Governorate where he met with Kharkiv University students Ivan Lypa, Mykola Baizdrenko, and Mykhailo Bazkevych. They visited the Taras Shevchenko Grave (Taras Hill) near Kaniv and created Ukrainian national underground political organization, the Taras Student Fraternity (Brotherhood of Taras). The fraternity was joined by such activists like Yevhen Tymchenko, Musiy Kononenko, Oleksandr Cherniakhivskyi, Mykola Mikhnovskyi and others.

Following university graduation, Borovyk worked by his specialty, but later switched to literary work and translations and managed to publish several fictions such as "Maty-Ukrainka" (Mother-Ukrainian). By late 1890 he became more closely related to the Kyiv hromada society and the General Non-partisan Ukrainian Organization (ZUBDO). In 1899 Borovyk was arrested and charged with propaganda of anarcho-socialists ideas. Following a five months of imprisonment, Borovyk was exiled from the Kherson Governorate prohibiting him to serve in institutions of the Ministry of National Enlightenment.

With assistance from Grigori Machtet, in 1900–1905 Borovyk worked as a director of laboratory at the Volhynian Governorate excise administration in Zhytomyr. In 1905–1910 he was an unchanged member of the Kremenets county administration, an organizer and active member of the Society of Volhynian region researchers, a secretary of natural and ethnographic section (since 1900). At the Volhynian Governorate zemstvo Borovyk established a department of agricultural statistics.

In 1910–1911 Borovyk moved to Odesa where he worked in Kherson Governorate zemstvo institutions and was a director of Ukrainian library "Dilo". During the World War I he headed the Odesa Ukrainian Committee in assistance to Galicia displaced people. In 1918 Borovyk took part in establishment of the Odesa Agricultural Institute (today Odessa State Agrarian University) where he worked until his arrest by the Soviet NKVD and execution during the Great Purge.
