= Prayer for Ukraine =

Ukrainian patriotic hymn

- Choral hymn and spiritual anthem by Mykola Lysenko
- Sheet music, choral setting by Oleksandr Koshyts (1910s)
- Native name: Молитва за Україну
- Text: by Oleksandr Konysky
- Language: Ukrainian
- Published: 1885
- Scoring: SATB choir
- Bozhe velykyj, jedynyj Performed by a mixed choir of faculty of culture and arts at Lviv University, conducted by Marija Kamins'ka

"Prayer for Ukraine" (Ukrainian: Молитва за Україну, romanized: Molytva za Ukrainu) is a patriotic Ukrainian hymn published in 1885, which became a spiritual anthem of Ukraine. The text was written by Oleksandr Konysky, and the music was composed by Mykola Lysenko, first with a children's choir in mind. The song became the regular closing hymn in services of the Ukrainian Greek Catholic Church, the Orthodox Church of Ukraine and other churches. It gained national significance when it was performed by mass choirs during the Ukrainian War of Independence in 1917–1920. The hymn was intended to be an official spiritual anthem of Ukraine. It has closed sessions of oblast councils, and has been performed at major national functions.

"Prayer for Ukraine" was performed in Kyiv in 2001 during a parade celebrating the 10th anniversary of Ukraine's independence. It has been part of church services internationally, in response to the Russian invasion of Ukraine. On 26 February 2022, the Ukrainian Chorus Dumka of New York performed the hymn in the cold open of Saturday Night Live.

== History ==
Oleksandr Konysky wrote a patriotic poem from February to 28 March 1885 in Kyiv, at a time when the Imperial Russian government suppressed the use of the Ukrainian language. The melody and a choral setting were written by Mykola Lysenko, a composer who inspired a Ukrainian national school of composition.

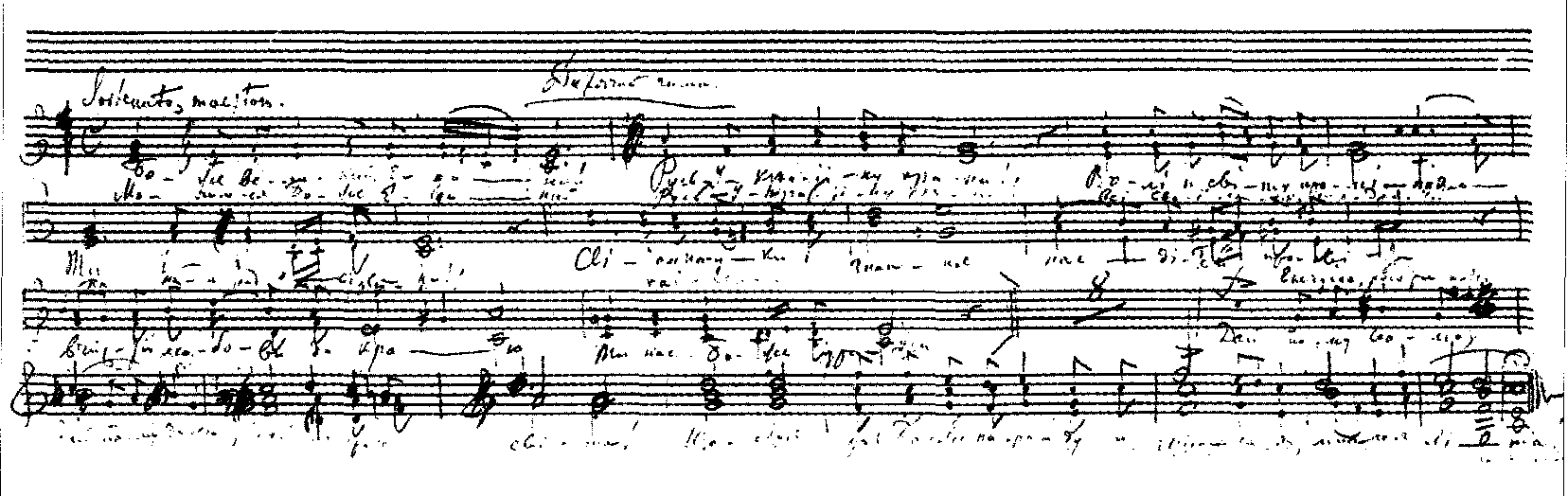
Autograph by Lysenko, 1885

Sheet music with romanised transcription, choral setting by Oleksandr Koshyts (1910s)

It was printed in Lviv in the summer of 1885, intended for a children's choir. The first title read: Молитва. Гімнѣ, на жѣночи голоси. Слова О. Я. Кониського, музика Миколы Лисенка, — Львовѣ., 1885, Лит[ографія] П. Прищляка, 4 с. (Prayer. Hymn, for women's voices. Text written by O. Ya. Konysky, Music Mykola Lysenko, Lviv., 1885, Lithography P. Pryshliak, 4 p.). It came as a score, with separate parts for soprano and alto. The setting proved to be too difficult for usual children's choirs.

On August 2, Prayer was first performed in Ternopil at a literary and musical evening on the occasion of a travel of Lviv students in Podillya.

The Prayer became widespread in the beginning of the 20th century in arrangements for mixed choir made by Viktor Matiuk in 1907, and Kyrylo Stetsenko and Oleksandr Koshyts in the 1910s. It acquired symbolic significance during the Ukrainian War of Independence in 1917–1920, then performed by thousands of choir members, conducted by Kyrylo Stetsenko, on Bohdan Khmelnytsky Square in Kyiv. It was sung at a national-patriotic rally on 20 December 1917, and on the occasion of the Unification Act of the UPR and WUPR on 22 January 1919.

On 14 July 1998, with an initiative of the Cabinet of Ministers of Ukraine, the hymn was part of the law project registered under #1229 "About the text of the State Anthem of Ukraine and the Spiritual Anthem of Ukraine". The author of the project was Anatoliy Holubchenko, a native of Mariupol and then First Vice Prime Minister of Ukraine (1997–99).

== Lyrics ==
Ukrainian original

Боже великий, єдиний,
Нам Україну храни,
Волі і світу промінням
Ти її осіни.

Світлом науки і знання
Нас, дітей, просвіти,
В чистій любові до краю,
Ти нас, Боже, зрости.

Молимось, Боже єдиний,
Нам Україну храни,
Всі свої ласки й щедроти
Ти на люд наш зверни.

Дай йому волю, дай йому долю,
Дай доброго світу, щастя,
Дай, Боже, народу
І многая, многая літа.

Ukrainian Latin alphabet

Bože velykyj, jedynyj,
Nam Ukrainu chrany,
Voli i svitu prominniam,
Ty ii osiny.

Svitlom nauky i znannia
Nas, ditej, prosvity,
V čystij liubovi do kraju,
Ty nas, Bože, zrosty.

Molymoś, Bože jedynyj,
Nam Ukrainu chrany,
Vsi svoi lasky j ščedroty,
Ty na liud naš zverny.

Daj jomu voliu, daj jomu doliu,
Daj dobroho svitu, ščastia,
Daj, Bože, narodu
I mnohaja, mnohaja lita.

IPA transcription

[ˈbɔ.ʒe ʋe.ˈɫɪ.kɪj je.ˈdɪ.nɪj |]
[ˈnɑm ʊ.krɐ.ˈji.nʊ xrɐ.ˈnɪ ‖]
[ˈʋɔ.lʲi (j)i‿ˈsʲʋʲi.tʊ pro.ˈmʲinʲ.nʲɐm |]
[ˈtɪ ji.ˈji o.sʲi.ˈnɪ ‖]

[ˈsʲʋʲit.ɫom nɐ.ˈu.kɪ (j)i‿ˈznɑnʲ.nʲɐ |]
[ˈnɑzʲ‿dʲi.ˈtɛj pro.sʲʋʲi.ˈtɪ ‖]
[u̯‿ˈtʃɪ.sʲtʲij lʲʊ.ˈbɔ.ʋʲi do ˈkrɑ.jʊ |]
[ˈtɪ nɐz‿ˈbɔ.ʒe zro.ˈstɪ ‖]

[ˈmɔ.ɫɪ.mosʲ | ˈbɔ.ʒe je.ˈdɪ.nɪj |]
[nɐm ʊ.krɐ.ˈji.nʊ xrɐ.ˈnɪ ‖]
[u̯sʲi sʋo.ˈji ˈɫɑ.skɪ‿j‿ˈʃtʃɛ.dro.tɪ |]
[ˈtɪ nɐ ˈlʲud nɐʒ‿zʋer.ˈnɪ ‖]

[ˈdɑj jo.ˈmu ˈʋɔ.lʲʊ | ˈdɑj jo.ˈmu ˈdɔ.lʲʊ |]
[ˈdɑj ˈdɔ.bro.ɦo ˈsʲʋʲi.tʊ | ˈʃtʃɑ.sʲtʲɐ ‖]
[ˈdɑj ˈbɔ.ʒe nɐ.ˈrɔ.dʊ |]
[i‿ˈmnɔ.ɦɐ.jɐ | ˈmnɔ.ɦɐ.jɐ lʲi.ˈtɑ ‖]

Literary translation by Dmytro Shostak

Lord, oh the Great and Almighty,
Protect our beloved Ukraine,
Bless her with freedom and light
Of your holy rays.

With learning and knowledge enlighten
Us, your children small,
In love pure and everlasting
Let us, oh Lord, grow.

We pray, oh Lord Almighty,
Protect our beloved Ukraine,
Grant our people and country
All your kindness and grace.

Bless us with freedom, bless us with wisdom,
Guide into kind world,
Bless us, oh Lord, with good fortune
For ever and evermore.

== Usage ==
=== Churches ===
"Prayer for Ukraine" closes each liturgy in the Ukrainian Greek Catholic Church, as well as the Orthodox Church of Ukraine and other churches.

=== National spiritual anthem ===
The anthem is sung at the end of some meetings of oblasts, raions, and city councils. Other occasions include the Day of Unity of Ukraine, Holodomor Memorial Day, and the anniversary of the deportation of the Crimean Tatars. In his memoir, Taras Hunczak recalled that the song opened a 1991 concert at the Taras Shevchenko National Opera and Ballet Theatre, organised by the Verkhovna Rada (the parliament of Ukraine) and celebrating the 125th anniversary of Mykhailo Hrushevsky's birth. It was performed on Khreshchatyk, the main street of Kyiv, in 2001 during the celebrations of the 10th anniversary of Ukraine's independence; The Ukrainian Weekly described it as "perhaps one of the most inspiring moments of the parade". In 2007, the Veryovka Ukrainian Folk Choir sang it at the opening of the sixth convocation of the Verkhovna Rada.

=== Recordings ===
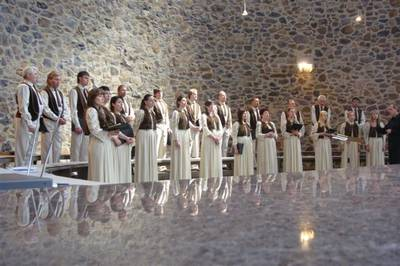
Oreya in a church service, in folk costumes

"Prayer for Ukraine" has been recorded several times. Oreya, a choir focused on Ukrainian music, chose the hymn as the first song of their 2000 album, its name as the title. It was also the opening of their 20th anniversary album in 2009. In 2002, Ukrainian Bandurist Chorus recorded "Prayer for Ukraine" in the album Golden echoes of Kyiv. In 2020, Mykhailo Khoma of Dzidzio recorded the hymn with the Youth Symphony Orchestra of Ukraine, conducted by Oksana Lyniv.

=== 2022 ===
"Prayer for Ukraine" has been performed internationally in church services related to the Russian invasion of Ukraine, already in anticipation of the conflict. On 24 February 2022, the day that the invasion officially began, the Los Angeles Chamber Orchestra spontaneously included "Prayer for Ukraine", arranged by its music librarian Serge Liberovsky, in a series concert in Santa Monica, between Mozart's Divertimento for String Trio and Dvořák's Serenade for Winds. It was introduced by an address about its significance. On 26 February, the Ukrainian Chorus Dumka of New York, a group founded in 1949 "to preserve and cultivate the rich musical heritage of Ukraine", performed the hymn in the cold open of Saturday Night Live, standing behind a table of candles that were arranged to spell "Kyiv".

== See also ==
- Mnohaya lita
