= Yevhen Tymchenko =

Ukrainian linguist

- Євген Тимченко
- Tymchenko in 1930
- Born: 8 November 1866; Poltava, Poltava Governorate, Russian Empire
- Died: 22 May 1948 (aged 81); Kyiv, Ukrainian SSR, Soviet Union
- Education: University of Kyiv
- Occupations: Linguist, translator, editor
- Writing career
- Pen name: Bohun
- Language: Ukrainian
- Genres: Academic writing, literary translation
- Subjects: History of Ukrainian language, Ukrainian grammar, Ukrainian syntax, Ukrainian dialectology, Ukrainian lexicography
- Notable work: Historical Dictionary of the Ukrainian Language (1930)

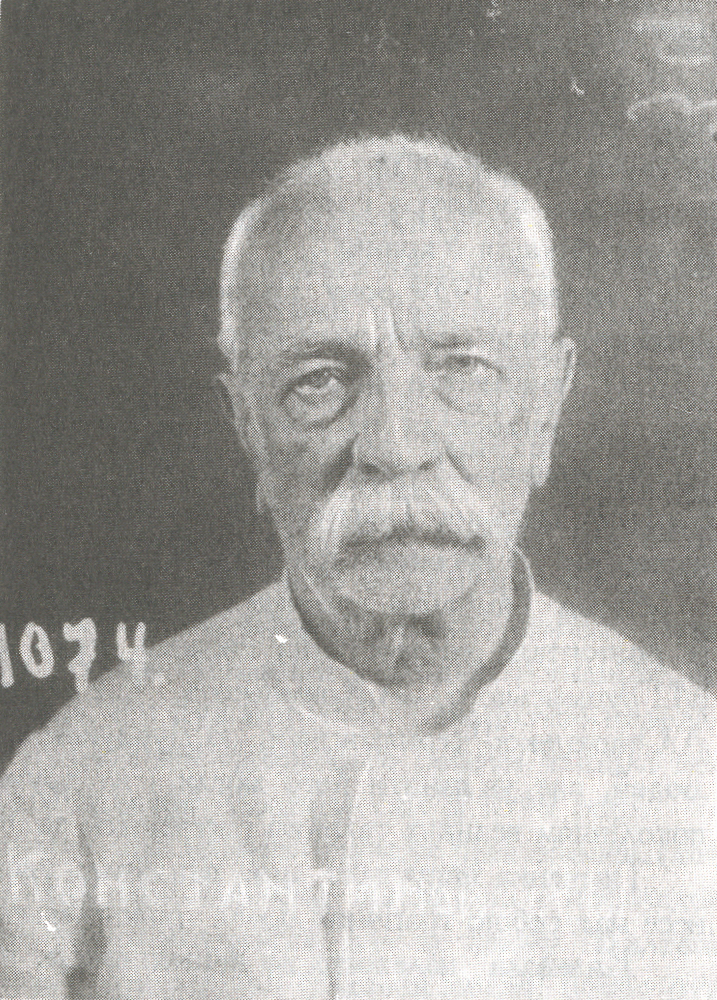
Tymchenko after his arrest in 1937

Yevhen Kostiantynovych Tymchenko (8 November (O.S. 27 October) 1866–22 May 1948) was a Ukrainian linguist, translator and academician, member of the Shevchenko Scientific Society, Ukrainian Scientific Society and fellow of the All-Ukrainian Academy of Sciences (from 1929). His research contributed to the publication of Borys Hrinchenko's Dictionary of the Ukrainian Language. Tymchenko published many of his works under the pseudonym Bohun.

== Biography ==
Yevhen Tymchenko was born on 8 November (O.S. 27 October) 1866 in Poltava. His family was rich, and he was homeschooled, receiving an equivalent of classical gymnasium education. In 1885 Tymchenko moved to Saint Petersburg, enrolling himself into the faculty of history and philology at the local university as a non-collegiate student. However, he was unable to finish studies due to poor health, and in 1889 left the university. In 1891 Tymchenko moved to Kyiv, and in 1893 found employment at the zemstvo administration in Chernihiv. While in Kyiv, Tymchenko established contacts with Ivan Lypa and became a member of Taras Brotherhood, taking part in the society's organizational, publishing and financial activities.

In 1898 Tymchenko was employed as a librarian's assistant at the Saint Volodymyr University of Kyiv. On behalf of Kievskaya Starina magazine, between 1901 and 1906 he conducted research on Ukrainian literary language of the 14th-18th centuries. He also published a "Russian-Little Russian dictionary, which was later used by Borys Hrinchenko in his own dictionary, and was a contributor to the Rada newspaper. In 1907 Tymchenko published the first volume of his work on Ukrainian grammar. In 1909 Tymchenko left his post in the library and entered Kyiv University as a student. After graduating, in 1911 he passed exams for the degree of Master of Arts, and in 1912 gave a number of probe lectures at the university. After receiving the title of privatdozent, in 1913 Tymchenko received an invitation to teach Russian language at the Higher Women's Courses in Warsaw. In 1916 he was awarded the title of docent at Warsaw University.

During the First World War, in 1915 Tymchenko was transferred to the position of extraordinary professor of linguistics at Rostov University. In 1917, he organized a branch of Prosvita society in Rostov-on-Don, and in 1918 served as its delegate to the Central Council of Ukraine. At the same time, he participated in a commission of the establishment of the Ukrainian Academy of Sciences as a representative of the Ukrainian Scientific Society. After returning to Kyiv, Tymchenko became a professor of Ukrainian philology at Kyiv University, and also taught at the Ukrainian State University. After the creation of the Ukrainian Academy of Sciences, Tymchenko headed a committee tasked with creating a historical dictionary of the Ukrainian language. In his private letters, he criticized the cooperation of Ukrainian State authorities with Russian monarchists.

In 1919 Tymchenko planned to emigrate to Switzerland, but one year later returned to Ukraine and worked as a professor of linguistics at the Kamianets-Podilskyi University. After the Bolshevik takeover of Ukraine, he contemplated moving to Galicia, but eventually remained in Kyiv. Tymchenko continued his scientific activities in Soviet Ukraine, working as a professor at Kyiv University and becoming a member of the Institute of Ukrainian Language. In 1925-1928 he also served as a member of a grammar reform commission at the People's Commissariat for Education of Ukraine. In 1929 Tymchenko edited a collection of works on Western studies published in Kyiv.

In October 1933 Tymchenko was fired from his post at the institute on accusation of "nationalist activities" and participation in the "Union for the Liberation of Ukraine", and was forced to retire. In 1938 he was arrested after being accused of participation in an "anti-Soviet Ukrainian nationalist organization". Tymchenko recognized himself as a nationalist, but refused to acknowledge his participation in any secret organization. In 1940 he was sentenced to 5 years of exile in Krasnoyarsk Krai. In 1940-1941 he lived in Dzerzhinskoye, and later moved to Achinsk. In 1943 Tymchenko was released and permitted to return to Kyiv. After an appeal by Maksym Rylsky and Leonid Bulakhovsky, he was able to continue work at the Institute of Ukrainian Language in Kyiv. In 1944 became a senior research associate at the institute, retaining that position until his death in 1948. In 1989 Tymchenko was posthumously rehabilitated.

== Work ==
=== Scientific activities ===
Tymchenko belonged to the ethnographic school of linguistics, and opposed the hypothesis about the existence of a single Old East Slavic language. He supported the purity of Ukrainian language and opposed Russian influences on its vocabulary and word formation. He contributed to the development of Ukrainian grammar, dialectology and lexicography. Thanks to his knowledge of German, French and English languages, Tymchenko was able to develop Ukrainian linguistics on the base of European scientific achievements. He received acclaim for his studies of Ukrainian syntax and case system. Tymchenko's historical dictionary was praised by Ivan Ohiyenko. However, as a result of political repression, a large part of Tymchenko's work was lost.

=== Translations ===
Tymchenko became known for his translation of Finnish and Estonian epics Kalevala and Kalevipoeg. He also translated works of Guy de Maupassant, Maurice Maeterlinck, Victor Hugo, George Byron and other authors.

=== Notable publications ===
- Russian-Little Russian Dictionary (Русско-малорусский словарь, 1897–1899) - 2 volumes
- Ukrainian Grammar (Українська граматика, 1907, 1917, 1918)
- Program on Gathering of Dialectal Varieties of Ukrainian Language (Програма до збирання діялектичних одмін української мови, 1910) - co-authored with K. Mykhalchuk
- Functions of Genitive in South-Russian Linguistic Area (Функции генетива в южнорусской языковой области, 1913)
- Slavic Unity and Position of Ukrainian Language in the Slavic Family (Слов’янська одність і становище української мови в словʼянській родині, 1924) - article
- Directions on how to record dialect materials in Ukrainian linguistic area (Вказівки, як записувати діялектичні матеріяли на українськім язиковім обширі, 1925)
- Locative in Ukrainian Language (Льокатив в українській мові, 1925)
- Nominative and Dative in Ukrainian Language (Номінатив і датив в українській мові, 1925)
- Vocative and Instrumental in Ukrainian Language (Вокатив і інструменталь в українській мові, 1926)
- Accusative in Ukrainian Language (Акузатив в українській мові, 1928)
- Course on the History of Ukrainian Language. Introduction and Phonetics (Курс історії українського язика. Вступ і фонетика, 1927, 1930)
- Historical Dictionary of the Ukrainian Language (Історичний словник українського язика, 1930) - 1st volume
