= Ukrainian phonology =

Ukrainian can be analyzed as having 6 phonemic vowels and 33 phonemic consonants as well as 5 marginal consonants, those being palatalized labials: /mʲ, pʲ, bʲ, fʲ, ʋʲ/. Ukrainian does not have phonemic vowel length, however consonants are distinguished based on gemination: па́на /'pana/ "sir (genitive)" vs па́нна /'panːa/ "lady".

== Vowels ==
Ukrainian vowel chart, from Pompino-Marschall, Steriopolo & Żygis (2016:353)

Ukrainian has the six monophthong phonemes shown below. /ɪ/ is a retracted close-mid front vowel [ɪ̞].

Vowels	Front	Central	Back
Close	i	ɪ	u
Mid	ɛ		ɔ
Open		a	

Ukrainian has no phonemic distinction between long and short vowels; however, unstressed vowels are shorter and tend to be more centralized. The unstressed vowel allophones are as follows:

- /i/ remains more or less [i].
- /ɛ/ and /ɪ/ approach [e], which may be a shared allophone for the two phonemes.
- /a/ is realized as [ɐ].
- /ɔ/ is realized as [o], or more towards /u/ if it is followed by a syllable with /i/ or /u/.
- /u/ is realized as [ʊ].

=== Vowel spelling ===
Letter	IPA	Example
а	/a/	та /ta/ "and"
е	/ɛ/	те /tɛ/ "that (neuter)"
и	/ɪ/	ти /tɪ/ "you (singular)"
о	/ɔ/	то /tɔ/ "that"
у	/u/	тут /tut/ "here"

Letter	After a consonant		Elsewhere	
Letter	IPA	Example	IPA	Example
я	/ʲa/	няня /'nʲanʲɐ/ "nanny"	/ja/	як /jak/ "how"
є	/ʲɛ/	востаннє /ʋɔs'tanːʲɛ/ "at last"	/jɛ/	єнот /jɛ'nɔt/ "raccoon"
і	/ʲi/	ні /nʲi/ "no"	/i/	іти /i'tɪ/ "to go"
ї			/ji/	Україна /ʊkrɐ'jinɐ/ "Ukraine"
ю	/ʲu/	нюх /nʲux/ "smell"	/ju/	юний /'junɪi̯/ "young"

== Diphthongs ==
Ukrainian can be analyzed as having 12 diphthongs with each vowel + closing /i̯/ or /u̯/:

Diphthongs	-i̯		-u̯	
Diphthongs	IPA	Example	IPA;	Example
a-	/ai̯/	рай /rai̯/ "heaven"	/au̯/	мав /mau̯/ "had"
ɛ-	/ɛi̯/	цей /t͡sɛi̯/ "this one"	/ɛu̯/	лев /lɛu̯/ "lion"
і-	/ii̯/	мій /m(ʲ)ii̯/ "my"	/iu̯/	рів /rʲiu̯/ "ditch"
ɪ-	/ɪi̯/	мий /mɪi̯/ "wash!"	/ɪu̯/	лив /ɫɪu̯/ "poured"
ɔ-	/ɔi̯/	той /tɔi̯/ "that one"	/ɔu̯/	шов /ʃɔu̯/ "seam"
u-	/ui̯/	куй /kui̯/ "forge!"	/uu̯/	був /buu̯/ "was"

== Consonants ==
The following table shows the consonant phonemes found in the modern Ukrainian language.

Consonants		Labial		Dental² / Alveolar		Palatal	Velar / Glottal
Consonants		plain	palat.¹	plain	palat.	Palatal	Velar / Glottal
Nasal		m	(mʲ)	n	nʲ		
Plosive	voiceless	p	(pʲ)	t	tʲ		k
Plosive	voiced	b	(bʲ)	d	dʲ		ɡ
Affricate	voiceless			t͡s	t͡sʲ	t͡ʃ	
Affricate	voiced			d͡z	d͡zʲ	d͡ʒ	
Fricative	voiceless	f	(fʲ)	s	sʲ	ʃ	x
Fricative	voiced	ʋ⁴	(ʋʲ)	z	zʲ	ʒ	ɦ⁵
Approximant		ʋ⁴	(ʋʲ)	ɫ	lʲ	j	
Rhotic³				r	rʲ		

1. While all consonants can be realized as semi-palatalized before /i/ or in loan words, semi-palatalized labial consonants may also occur in certain words before /a/ or /ɔ/. The phonemicity of palatalized labials (/pʲ/, /bʲ/, /fʲ/, /ʋʲ/, /mʲ/) is debated, as there are no minimal pairs with their non-palatalized counterparts. They mainly occur in loanwords, imitating foreign /y/, for example: бюро́ [bʲu'rɔ] "bureau", пюре́ [pʲu'rɛ] "purée", фюзеля́ж [fʲʊzeˈlʲaʒ] "fuselage"; of French origin. /ʋʲ/ and /mʲ/ only occur in a handful of native words in a consonant cluster, for example: свя́то /'s(ʲ)ʋʲatɔ/ "holiday", духмя́ний /dux'mʲanɪi̯/ "fragrant".
2. /t, d, dʲ, n, nʲ, s, sʲ, z, zʲ, t͡s, t͡sʲ, d͡z, d͡zʲ/ are dental [t̪, d̪, d̪ʲ, n̪, n̪ʲ, s̪, s̪ʲ, z̪, z̪ʲ, t̪͡s̪, t̪͡s̪ʲ, d̪͡z̪, d̪͡z̪ʲ], while /tʲ, ɫ, lʲ, r, rʲ/ are alveolar [tʲ, ɫ, lʲ, r, rʲ].
3. /r/ and /rʲ/ are often realized as single tap [ɾ] and [ɾʲ].
4. The realization of the labial approximant varies between [ʋ], [β] and [w]. It is most commonly pronounced as [w] (also transcribed as [u̯]) in syllable codas as well as word-initially before a consonant, where it often alternates with /u/.
5. There is no complete agreement about the phonetic nature of sound rendered by the letter Г. It is realised in three most frequent allophones: velar [ɣ], pharyngeal [ʕ], and glottal [ɦ]. In weak devoiced positions it can also be realised as [ħ] or sometimes [x]. The sound is described as "laryngeal fricative consonant" (гортанний щілинний приголосний) in the official orthography in 2012 and as a pharyngeal fricative (глотковий щілинний приголосний) in the most recent edition of the official orthography in 2019.

=== Consonant spelling ===
Letter	Plain		Palatalized (before ь, і, є, ю, я)	
Letter	IPA	Example	IPA	Example
м	/m/	мати /'matɪ/ "mother"	/mʲ/	духмяний /dux'mʲanɪi̯/ "fragrant"
п	/p/	пара /'parɐ/ "steam"	/pʲ/	пюре /pʲu'rɛ/ "purée"
б	/b/	бар /bar/ "bar"	/bʲ/	бюджет /bʲu'd͡ʒɛt/ "budget"
ф	/f/	фон /fɔn/ "background"	/fʲ/	фюзеляж /fʲʊzeˈlʲaʒ/ "fuselage"
в	/ʋ/	вино /ʋɪ'nɔ/ "wine"	/ʋʲ/	свято /'s(ʲ)ʋʲatɔ/ "holiday"
н	/n/	нора /nɔ'ra/ "burrow"	/nʲ/	нюх /nʲux/ "smell"
т	/t/	тура /tʊ'ra/ "rook"	/tʲ/	тюрма /tʲur'ma/ "prison"
д	/d/	дурень /'durenʲ/ "fool"	/dʲ/	дядько /'dʲadʲkɔ/ "uncle"
ц	/t͡s/	цар /t͡sar/ "tsar"	/t͡sʲ/	ця /t͡sʲa/ "this (feminine)"
дз	/d͡z/	дзиґа /'d͡zɪɡɐ/ "spinning top"	/d͡zʲ/	ґедзь /ɡɛd͡zʲ/ "gadfly"
с	/s/	сум /sum/ "sadness"	/sʲ/	сюди /sʲʊ'dɪ/ "hither"
з	/z/	раз /raz/ "once"	/zʲ/	князь /knʲazʲ/ "kniaz"
л	/ɫ/	лампа /'ɫampɐ/ "lamp"	/lʲ/	лялька /'lʲalʲkɐ/ "doll"
р	/r/	рука /rʊ'ka/ "hand"	/rʲ/	рюкзак /rʲʊɡ'zak/ "backpack"
ч	/t͡ʃ/	чудо /'t͡ʃudɔ/ "miracle"	/t͡ʃ(ʲ)/	чіпати /t͡ʃ(ʲ)i'pate/ "to grab"
дж	/d͡ʒ/	ходжу /xo'd͡ʒu/ "I walk"	/d͡ʒ(ʲ)/	емоджі /e'mɔd͡ʒ(ʲ)i/ "emoji"
ш	/ʃ/	шум /ʃum/ "noise"	/ʃ(ʲ)/	шість /ʃ(ʲ)isʲtʲ/ "six"
ж	/ʒ/	жук /ʒuk/ "bug"	/ʒ(ʲ)/	жінка /'ʒ(ʲ)inkɐ/ "woman"
щ	/ʃt͡ʃ/	щука /'ʃt͡ʃukɐ/ "pike (fish)"	/ʃt͡ʃ(ʲ)/	щі /ʃt͡ʃ(ʲ)i/ "shchi"
й	/j/	йогурт /'jɔɦʊrt/ "yogurt"		
к	/k/	кинь /kɪnʲ/ "throw!"	/k(ʲ)/	кінь /k(ʲ)inʲ/ "horse"
ґ	/ɡ/	ґанок /'ɡanɔk/ "porch"	/ɡ(ʲ)/	Ґільґамеш /ɡ(ʲ)ilʲɡɐ'mɛʃ/ "Gilgamesh"
х	/x/	хата /'xatɐ/ "hut"	/x(ʲ)/	хімія /'x(ʲ)im(ʲ)ijɐ/ "chemistry"
г	/ɦ/	голос /'ɦɔɫɔs/ "voice"	/ɦ(ʲ)/	гімн /ɦ(ʲ)imn/ "anthem"

=== Consonant assimilation ===
Unlike Russian and several other Slavic languages, Ukrainian does not have final devoicing for most obstruents, as can be seen, for example, in віз "cart", which is pronounced [ˈʋ⁽ʲ⁾iz], not *[ˈʋ⁽ʲ⁾is].

Ukrainian however has assimilatory voicing: voiceless obstruents are voiced when preceding voiced obstruents. (Voiced sonorants do not trigger voicing.)

- наш [naʃ] ('our')
- наш дід [nɐʒ ˈd^{⁽ʲ⁾}id] ('our grandfather')

There is no such assimilation in the reverse direction (voicing of voiceless obstruents following voiced obstruents).

- бере́за [beˈrɛzɐ] ('birch')
- бері́зка [beˈr⁽ʲ⁾izkɐ] ('small birch')

With a few exceptions, there is no word-final or assimilatory devoicing in Ukrainian. The exceptions are легко, вогко, нігті, кігті, дьогтю, дігтяр, and their derivatives: /ɦ/ may then be devoiced to [h] or even merge with /x/.

Unpalatalized dental consonants /n, t, d, t͡s, d͡z, s, z, r, l/ become palatalized if they are followed by other palatalized dental consonants /nʲ, tʲ, dʲ, t͡sʲ, d͡zʲ, sʲ, zʲ, rʲ, lʲ/. They are also typically palatalized before the vowel /i/. Historically, contrasting unpalatalized and palatalized articulations of consonants before /i/ were possible and more common, with the absence of palatalization usually reflecting that regular sound changes in the language made an /i/ vowel actually evolve from an older, non-palatalizing /ɔ/ vowel. Ukrainian grammar still allows for /i/ to alternate with either /ɛ/ or /ɔ/ in the regular inflection of certain words. The absence of consonant palatalization before /i/ has become rare, however, but is still allowed when the і succeeding a consonant originated from older о, evidenced by о preserved in some word forms such as стіл / стола ("table", N sg./G sg.).

While the labial consonants /m, p, b, f, w/ cannot be fully phonemically palatalized, they can still precede one of the iotating vowels є і ьо ю я, and are realized as semi-palatalized, with many speakers replacing the would-be sequences *|mʲ, pʲ, bʲ, fʲ, wʲ| with the consonant clusters /mj, pj, bj, fj, wj/, a habit also common in nearby Polish. The separation of labial consonants from /j/ is already hard-coded in many Ukrainian words (and written as such with an apostrophe), such as in В'ячеслав /wjat͡ʃɛˈslaw/ "Vyacheslav", ім'я /iˈmja/ "name" and п'ять /pjatʲ/ "five". The combinations of labials with iotating vowels most commonly occur in loan words, e. g. бюро /bʲuˈrɔ/ "bureau", as well as in certain native words when following consonants and followed by /a/ or /ɔ/, e.g. духмяний /duxˈmʲanɪj/ "aromatic", мавпячий /ˈmawpʲat͡ʃɪj/ "monkey (adj.)", and цвьохнути /ˈt͡sʲwʲɔxnutɪ/ "to clang". Such combinations are written without the apostrophe after consonants (except ⟨р⟩) in the same morpheme, e.g. свято /ˈsʲwʲatɔ/ "holiday" (but черв'як /t͡ʃerˈwjak/ "worm" and зв'язок /zwjaˈzɔk/ "union", where з- is a prefix). Unlike other semi-palatalized labial consonants, /wʲ/ can have a distinguishing role in words, e.g. свят /ˈsʲwʲat/ "holiday, G pl." and сват /swat/ "matchmaker".

Dental sibilant consonants /t͡s, d͡z, s, z/ become palatalized before any of the labial consonants /m, p, b, f, w/ followed by one of the iotating vowels є і ьо ю я, but the labial consonants themselves cannot retain full phonemic palatalization.

Sibilant consonants (including affricates) in clusters assimilate with the place of articulation and palatalization state of the last segment in a cluster. The most common case of such assimilation is the verbal ending -шся in which |ʃsʲa| assimilates into /sʲːa/.

Dental plosives /t, tʲ, d, dʲ/ assimilate to affricate articulations before coronal affricates or fricatives /t͡s, d͡z, s, z, t͡sʲ, d͡zʲ, sʲ, zʲ, t͡ʃ, d͡ʒ, ʃ, ʒ/ and assume the latter consonant's place of articulation and palatalization. If the sequences |t.t͡s, d.d͡z, t.t͡sʲ, d.d͡zʲ, t.t͡ʃ, d.d͡ʒ| regressively assimilate to */t͡s.t͡s, d͡z.d͡z, t͡sʲ.t͡sʲ, d͡zʲ.d͡zʲ, t͡ʃ.t͡ʃ, d͡ʒ.d͡ʒ/, they gain geminate articulations /t͡sː, d͡zː, t͡sʲː, d͡zʲː, t͡ʃː, d͡ʒː/.

== Morphophonology ==
=== Vowel alternations ===
Ukrainian exhibits a system of vowel alternations, where the open-mid vowels /ɛ/ and /ɔ/ get raised to /i/ in closed syllables:

Open syllable	Closed syllable
/ɔ/	/i/
ко-ти /kɔ.tɪ/ "cats"	кіт /kit/ "cat"
сто-я-ти /stɔ.ja.tɪ/ "to stand"	стій! /stʲij/ "stand!"
зго-ден /zɦɔ.dɛn/ "agreeing (masc.)"	згід-на /zɦid.na/ "agreeing (fem.)"
/ɛ/	/i/
о-се-ні /ɔ.sɛ.nʲi/ "autumn's"	о-сінь /ɔ.sinʲ/ "autumn"
Ки-є-ва /kɪ.jɛ.ʋa/ "Kyiv's"	Ки-їв /kɪ.jiʋ/ "Kyiv"

In turn, vowels /ɛ/ and /ɔ/ in closed syllables drop in open syllables:

Closed syllable	Open syllable
/ɔ/	∅
жі-нок /ʒi.nɔk/ "women's"	жін-ки /ʒin.kɪ/ "women"
мо-ло-ток /mɔ.lɔ.tɔk/ "hammer"	мо-лот-ком /mɔ.lɔt.kɔm/ "with a hammer"
/ɛ/	∅ or /ʲ/
ли-пень /lɪ.pɛnʲ/ "July"	у лип-ні /u lɪp.nʲi/ "in July"
стрі-лець /stri.lɛt͡sʲ/ "rifleman"	стріль-ці /strilʲ.t͡sʲi/ "riflemen"

Some rarer vowel alternations include:

1. /ɔ/ - /a/ (before a stressed /a/)

горіти /ɦɔritɪ/ "to burn" - гарячий /ɦarʲat͡ʃɪi̯/ "hot"

2. /ɛ/ - /ɔ/ (after post-alveolars)

шести /ʃɛstɪ/ "six (gen.)" - шостий /ʃɔstɪi̯/ "sixth"

3. /ɛ/ - /ɪ/ - ∅ (in some verb roots)

беру /bɛru/ "I take" - збирати /zbɪratɪ/ "to gather" - брати /bratɪ/ "to take"

=== Palatalization ===
1. Iotation: Occurred in *Cj combinations. Now is mainly seen in verb conjugations:
  - /tj/ → /t͡ʃ/: летіти /lɛtitɪ/ "to fly" → лечу /lɛt͡ʃu/ "I fly"
  - /dj/ → /d͡ʒ/: водити /ʋɔdɪtɪ/ "to lead" → воджу /ʋɔd͡ʒu/ "I lead"
  - /sj/ → /ʃ/: просити /prɔsɪtɪ/ "to request" → прошу /prɔʃu/ "I request"
  - /zj/ → /ʒ/: возити /ʋɔzɪtɪ/ "to transport" → вожу /ʋɔʒu/ "I transport"
  - /stj/ → /ʃt͡ʃ/: простити /prɔstɪtɪ/ "to forgive" → прощу /prɔʃt͡ʃu/ "I will forgive"
  - /zdj/ → /ʒd͡ʒ/: їздити /jizdɪtɪ/ "to drive" → їжджу /jiʒd͡ʒu/ "I drive"
  - /pj/ → /plʲ/: топити /tɔpɪtɪ/ "to heat" → топлю /toplʲu/ "I heat"
  - /bj/ → /blʲ/: любити /lʲubɪtɪ/ "to love" → люблю /lʲublʲu/ "I love"
  - /mj/ → /mlʲ/: ломити /lɔmɪtɪ/ "to overcome" → ломлю /lɔmlʲu/ "I overcome"
  - /ʋj/ → /ʋlʲ/: давити /daʋɪtɪ/ "to squeeze" → давлю /daʋlʲu/ "I squeeze"
2. First palatalization: Occurred to velars before front vowels. Now is mainly seen in derivations, like the diminutive -ик/-ок/-ка/-ко:
  - /k/ → /t͡ʃ/: рука /ruka/ "hand" → ручка /rut͡ʃka/ "handle"
  - /x/ → /ʃ/: муха /muxa/ "fly" → мушка /muʃka/ "little fly"
  - /ɦ/ → /ʒ/: нога /noɦa/ "leg" → ніжка /nʲiʒka/ "little leg"
3. Second palatalization: Occurred to velars before front vowels. Now is mainly seen with the locative ending -і:
  - /k/ → /t͡sʲ/: рука /ruka/ "hand" → на руці /na rut͡sʲi/ "on the hand"
  - /x/ → /sʲ/: вухо /ʋuxɔ/ "ear" → у вусі /u ʋusʲi/ "in the ear"
  - /ɦ/ → /zʲ/: нога /noɦa/ "leg" → на нозі /na nɔzʲi/ "on the leg"

=== Alternation of vowels and semivowels ===
The semivowels /j/ and /w/ alternate with the vowels /i/ and /u/ respectively. The semivowels are used in syllable codas: after a vowel and before a consonant, either within a word or between words:

він іде́ /ˈʋ⁽ʲ⁾in iˈdɛ/ ('he's coming')
вона́ йде /wɔˈna ˈjdɛ/ ('she's coming')
він і вона́ /ˈʋ⁽ʲ⁾in i wɔˈna/ ('he and she')
вона́ й він /wɔˈna j ˈʋ⁽ʲ⁾in/ ('she and he');

Утоми́вся вже /utɔˈmɪwsʲa ˈwʒɛ/ ('already gotten tired')
Уже́ втоми́вся /uˈʒɛ wtɔˈmɪwsʲa/ ('already gotten tired')
Він утоми́вся. /ˈʋ⁽ʲ⁾in utɔˈmɪwsʲa/ ('He's gotten tired.')
Він у ха́ті. /ˈʋ⁽ʲ⁾in u ˈxat⁽ʲ⁾i/ ('He's inside the house.')
Вона́ в ха́ті. /wɔˈna w ˈxat⁽ʲ⁾i/ ('She's inside the house.')
підучи́ти /piduˈt͡ʃɪtɪ/ ('to learn/teach (a little more)')
ви́вчити /ˈʋɪwt͡ʃɪtɪ/ ('to have learnt')

=== Vowel epenthesis ===
When two or more consonants occur word-finally, a vowel is epenthesized under the following conditions: Given a consonantal grouping C_{1}(ь)C_{2}(ь), ‘C’ being any consonant, the vowel is inserted between the two consonants and after the ь. A vowel is not inserted unless C_{2} is /k/, /w/, /l/, /m/, /r/, or /t͡s/. Then:

1. If C_{1} is /w/, /ɦ/, /k/, or /x/, the epenthesized vowel is always [o].
  - No vowel is epenthesized if the /w/ is derived from a Common Slavic vocalic *l, for example, /wɔwk/ (see below).
2. If C_{2} is /l/, /m/, /r/, or /t͡s/, then the vowel is [e].
3. The combinations /-stw/ and /-sk/ are not broken up.
4. If C_{1} is /j/ (й), both the form with the epenthetic vowel (according to the above rules) and the form without it can be found.

== Stress ==
Stress is phonemic in Ukrainian, and is not predictable. Some words or inflections are distinguished only via the stress placement, for example: плачу́ /plɐ'tʃu/ "I pay" vs пла́чу /'platʃu/ "I cry" or голови́ /ɦɔlɔ'ʋɪ/ "head (genitive)" vs го́лови /'ɦɔlɔʋɪ/ "heads".

The position is generally fixed for the various cases of the noun (though inflection stress shifts to the last vowel of the stem if the inflection is a zero suffix), but may change with number (stem stress in both singular and plural, e.g. теа́тр 'theater' ~ теа́три 'theaters'; stem stress in the singular and inflection stress in the plural, e.g. жі́нка 'woman' ~ жінки́ 'women'; and so on for all permutations.)

The pattern with adjectives is similar to that of nouns, but does not differ between singular and plural (all stem stress or all inflection stress). In some inflection-stressed adjectives, stress shifts to the stem in the comparative.

With most verbs, stress falls on a syllable in the stem. That syllable may differ between the perfective and imperfective aspects (verbs with 'shifting stress'), but otherwise the stress remains on the same syllable for all inflections. A small group of verbs which do not shift for aspect and have е in their stems bear stress on the inflection. That stress is always on the last syllable of the word apart from in the future imperfective, where it is on the same syllable as in the infinitive (INF нести́, FUT.NPFV.3SG нести́ме 'carry').

With numerals, stress placement may differ between ordinal and cardinal forms.

For names, stress may shift between given names (Богда́н, Рома́н) and family names (Бо́гдан, Ро́ман), and between patronymics (Іва́нович, Богда́нович) and family names (Івано́вич, Богдано́вич).

== Historical phonology ==
Modern standard Ukrainian descends from Common Slavic and is characterized by a number of sound changes and morphological developments, many of which are shared with other East Slavic languages. These include:

1. In a newly closed syllable, that is, a syllable that ends in a consonant, Common Slavic *o and *e mutated into /i/ if the following vowel was one of the yers (*ŭ or *ĭ); for example, CSl. *pêktь → Ukr. піч (pič "oven") & CSl. *nôsъ → Ukr. ніс (nis "nose").
2. Pleophony: The Common Slavic combinations, *CoRC and *CeRC, where R is either *r or *l, become in Ukrainian:
  1. CorC gives CoroC (Common Slavic *borda gives Ukrainian boroda, борода́)
  2. ColC gives ColoC (Common Slavic *bolto gives Ukrainian boloto, боло́то)
  3. CerC gives CereC (Common Slavic *berza gives Ukrainian bereza, бере́за)
  4. CelC gives ColoC (Common Slavic *melko gives Ukrainian moloko, молоко́)
3. The Common Slavic nasal vowel *ę is reflected as /ja/; a preceding labial consonant generally was not palatalized after this, and after a postalveolar it became /a/. Examples: Common Slavic *pętĭ became Ukrainian /pjatʲ/ (п’ять); Common Slavic *telę became Ukrainian /tɛˈlʲa/ (теля́); and Common Slavic *kurĭčę became Ukrainian /kurˈt͡ʃa/ (курча́).
4. Common Slavic *ě (Cyrillic ѣ), generally became Ukrainian /i/: CSl. *cělъjь → Ukr. ці́лий (cílyj "whole, entire (adj.)"); except:
  1. word-initially, where it became /ji/: Common Slavic *(j)ěsti became Ukrainian ї́сти /ˈjistɪ/
  2. after the postalveolar sibilants where it became /a/: Common Slavic *ležěti became Ukrainian /lɛˈʒatɪ/ (лежа́ти)
5. Common Slavic *i and *y are both reflected in Ukrainian as /ɪ/
6. The Common Slavic combination -CĭjV, where V is any vowel, became -CʲːV, except:
  1. if C is labial or /r/ where it became -CjV
  2. if V is the Common Slavic *e, then the vowel in Ukrainian mutated to /a/, e.g., Common Slavic *žitĭje became Ukrainian /ʒɪˈtʲːa/ (життя́)
  3. if V is Common Slavic *ĭ, then the combination became /ɛj/, e.g., genitive plural in Common Slavic *myšĭjĭ became Ukrainian /mɪˈʃɛj/ (мише́й)
  4. if one or more consonants precede C then there is no doubling of the consonants in Ukrainian
7. Sometime around the early thirteenth century, the voiced velar stop lenited to [ɣ] (except in the cluster *zg). Within a century, /ɡ/ was reintroduced from Western European loanwords and, around the sixteenth century, [ɣ] debuccalized to [ɦ].
8. Common Slavic combinations *dl and *tl were simplified to /l/, for example, Common Slavic *mydlo became Ukrainian /ˈmɪlɔ/ (ми́ло).
9. Common Slavic *ŭl and *ĭl became /ɔw/. For example, Common Slavic *vĭlkŭ became /wɔwk/ (вовк) in Ukrainian.

== Sources ==
- Becker, Lee A. (1980). "On the Phonetic Nature of the Origin of Ukrainian Ikavism". Canadian Slavonic Papers / Revue Canadienne des Slavistes. 22 (3): 400–407. doi:10.1080/00085006.1980.11091637. JSTOR 40867757.
- Buk, Solomija; Mačutek, Ján; Rovenchak, Andrij (2008), "Some properties of the Ukrainian writing system", Glottometrics, 16: 63–79, arXiv:0802.4198, Bibcode:2008arXiv0802.4198B
- Carlton, T.R. (1972), A Guide to the Declension of Nouns in Ukrainian, Edmonton, Alberta: University of Alberta Press
- Danyenko, Andrii; Vakulenko, Serhii (1995), Ukrainian, Lincom Europa, ISBN 978-3-929075-08-3
- Derksen, Rick (2008). Etymological Dictionary of the Slavic Inherited Lexicon (Leiden Indo-European Etymological Dictionary Series; 4). Leiden, Boston: Brill.
- Mascaró, Joan; Wetzels, W. Leo (2001). "The Typology of Voicing and Devoicing". Language. 77 (2): 207–244. doi:10.1353/lan.2001.0123. S2CID 28948663.
- Pohribnyj, M.I., ed. (1986), Орфоепічний словни, Kyiv: Radjans’ka škola
- Pompino-Marschall, Bernd; Steriopolo, Elena; Żygis, Marzena (2016), "Ukrainian", Journal of the International Phonetic Association, 47 (3): 349–357, doi:10.1017/S0025100316000372, S2CID 232344731
- Ponomariv, O.D., ed. (2001), Сучасна українська мова: Підручник, Kyiv: Lybid’
- Pugh, Stefan; Press, Ian (2005) [First published 1999], Ukrainian: A Comprehensive Grammar, London: Routledge
- Rusanivs’kyj, V. M.; Taranenko, O. O.; Zjabljuk, M. P.; et al. (2004). Українська мова: Енциклопедія. Вид-во "Українська енцклопедія" ім. М. П. Бажана. ISBN 978-966-7492-19-9.
- Shevelov, George Y. (1977). "On the Chronology of h and the New g in Ukrainian" (PDF). Harvard Ukrainian Studies. 1 (2). Cambridge: Harvard Ukrainian Research Institute: 137–152. Archived from the original (PDF) on 2019-01-05.
- Shevelov, George Y. (1993), "Ukrainian", in Comrie, Bernard; Corbett, Greville (eds.), The Slavonic Languages, London and New York: Routledge, pp. 947–998
- Vakulenko, Maksym O. (2019), "Ukrainian Consonant Phones in the IPA Context with Special Reference to /v/ and /gh/" (PDF), Linguistica Online (22): 36–61, ISSN 1801-5336
- Žovtobrjux, M.A., ed. (1973), Українська літературна вимова і наголос: Словник – довідник, Kyiv: Nakova dumka
- Žovtobrjux, M.A.; Kulyk, B.M. (1965). Курс сучасної української літературної мови. Частина I. Kyiv: Radjans’ka škola.
