= Vertiivka rural hromada =

Vertiivka rural hromada Вертіївська сільська громада
- Hromada
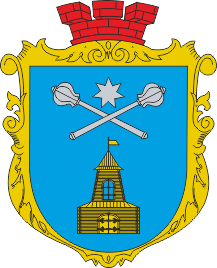
- Coat of arms
- Interactive map of Vertiivka rural hromada
- Country: Ukraine
- Oblast: Chernihiv
- Raion: Nizhyn

Area
  - Total: 678.4 km^{2} (261.9 sq mi)

Population (2020)
  - Total: 8,020
  - Density: 11.8/km^{2} (30.6/sq mi)
- CATOTTG code: UA74040090000047246
- Settlements: 24
- Rural settlements: 1
- Villages: 23
- Website: vertiivska-gromada.gov.ua

Vertiivka rural hromada (Ukrainian: Вертіївська сільська громада) is a hromada of Ukraine, located in Nizhyn Raion, Chernihiv Oblast. Its administrative center is the village of Vertiivka.

It has an area of 678.4 square kilometres (261.9 mi^{2}) and a population of 8,020, as of 2020.

== Composition ==
The hromada contains 24 settlements, with 23 villages:

- Berezanka
- Bobryk
- Velika Koshelyvka
- Vertiivka
- Duboluhivka
- Zanky
- Zrub
- Kabluky
- Kardashi
- Kolisnyky
- Kukshin
- Lypiv Rih
- Lisove
- Mala Koshelyvka
- Mylnyky
- Nyzy
- Perekhodivka
- Stodoli
- Tytivka
- Kholyavki
- Khomine
- Chernyakhivka
- Yabluneve

And 1 rural-type settlement: Yunist.

== See also ==
- List of hromadas of Ukraine
