= Yurii Lypa =

Ukrainian writer and political activist (1900–1944)

- Юрій Липа
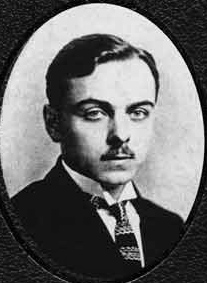
- Lypa in the 1910s
- Born: 5 May 1900; Odesa, Russian Empire (now Ukraine)
- Died: 20 August 1944 (aged 44); Shutova, Ukrainian SSR, Soviet Union (now Yavoriv urban hromada, Ukraine)
- Education: Odesa University; Poznań University of Medical Sciences; University of Warsaw
- Known for: Ukrainian nationalism, poetry

Yurii Ivanovych Lypa (Ukrainian: Юрій Іванович Липа; 5 May 1900 – 20 August 1944) was a Ukrainian writer, poet, political activist, translator and physician.

== Early life ==
Yurii's father, Ivan Lypa, was the well-known Ukrainian poet, doctor and patriot.

At a young age, Yurii Lypa showed an interest in writing. Famous Ukrainian writers Ivan Franko and Volodymyr Samiylenko read his work and commented positively.

Lypa began his education in Odesa and after graduating from school he entered the Law Department of Novorosiyskyi University. In 1917, Lypa became the editor of the Odesskiy Vestnik magazine and published his first pamphlets: Liberation of Ukraine Union ("Soyuz vyzvolennia Ukrainy"), Kyivan Kingdom According to Bismarck’s Project ("Korolivstvo Kyivske za proektom Bismarka"), Wear your Awards ("Nosit svoi vidznaky") and Hetman Ivan Mazepa. These works were published in his father's publishing house, Narodnyi Stiah.

During the October Revolution in Ukraine, Yurii Lypa sided against the Bolsheviks, and fought for the cause of an independent Ukraine. In 1920, Ivan and Yurii Lypa moved to Kamianets-Podilskyi, in western Ukraine.

In 1922, Yurii Lypa studied medicine at the Poznań University of Medical Sciences in Poland. After graduation, he moved to Warsaw where he graduated from the Military School of Medicine in 1931.

== Medical career and literary development ==
Yurii Lypa commenced work at the University of Warsaw.

Yurii Lypa's first poetry book, entitled Serenity ('Svitlist'), was published in Poland in 1925. In 1929, Yurii Lypa, together with Yevhen Malanyuk, established the literary group 'Tank'. The group's members included the outstanding Ukrainian writers Leonid Mosendz, Natalia Livytska-Kholodna and Oleksa Stefanovych. The young writers gathered to discuss and develop their literary works, incorporating the ideal of reviving the Ukrainian nation. Yurii Lypa's second poetry book Severity ('Suvorist'), which was published in 1931, reflected this ideology, expressing faith in the Ukrainian nation's independent and prosperous future.

In 1934, Yurii Lypa's novel Cossacks in Moskovia ('Kozaky v Moskovii') was published in Warsaw, which was followed shortly by a collection of his literature essays, entitled Fight for Ukraine ('Biy za Ukrainu'). In 1936, Notebook ('Notatnyk'), comprising three volumes of the author's short stories, was published. The stories were mainly concerned with Ukrainian War of Independence. The same year he produced the political works Ukrainian Age ('Ukrainska doba') and Ukrainian Race ('Ukrainska rasa'). Perhaps Lypa's most well known political and philosophical work is his trilogy Cause of Ukraine ('Pryznachennya Ukrainy') (1938), The Black Sea Doctrine ('Tchornomorska doktryna') (1940) and The Severance of Russia ('Rozpodil Rosii') (1941).

Following his father's steps, Yurii Lypa continued his medical practice. He specialised in phytotherapy and was a great phytotherapist. He also published the medical books: Phytotherapy (‘Phytotherapy’) (1933), Healing Herbs in Ancient and Modern Medicine (‘Tsilyushchi roslyny v davniy I sychasniy medytsyni’) (1937) and The Cure Beneath Our Feet (‘Liky pid nohamy’) (1943).

== Political activities ==
Living in exile did not prevent Yurii Lypa from working on matters concerning Ukraine and its future. In 1940, together with Ivan Shovhenivskyi, Valentyn Sadovsky, Lev Bykovskyi and Vadym Scherbakivskyi, Lypa founded the Ukrainian Chornomorskyi (Black Sea) Institute, a research body focused on the potential economic and political problems Ukraine would face if it gained independence.

With the beginning of the World War II and the invasion of Poland, Yurii Lypa was mobilized. However, he soon returned to Warsaw, where he founded the Ukrainian Public Committee, to help eastern Ukrainian refugees. Yurii Lypa was aware that both Soviet and German Nazi authorities were monitoring him. Although Lypa had a chance to migrate to a safe destination, he decided to return to Ukraine.

== Last years and death ==
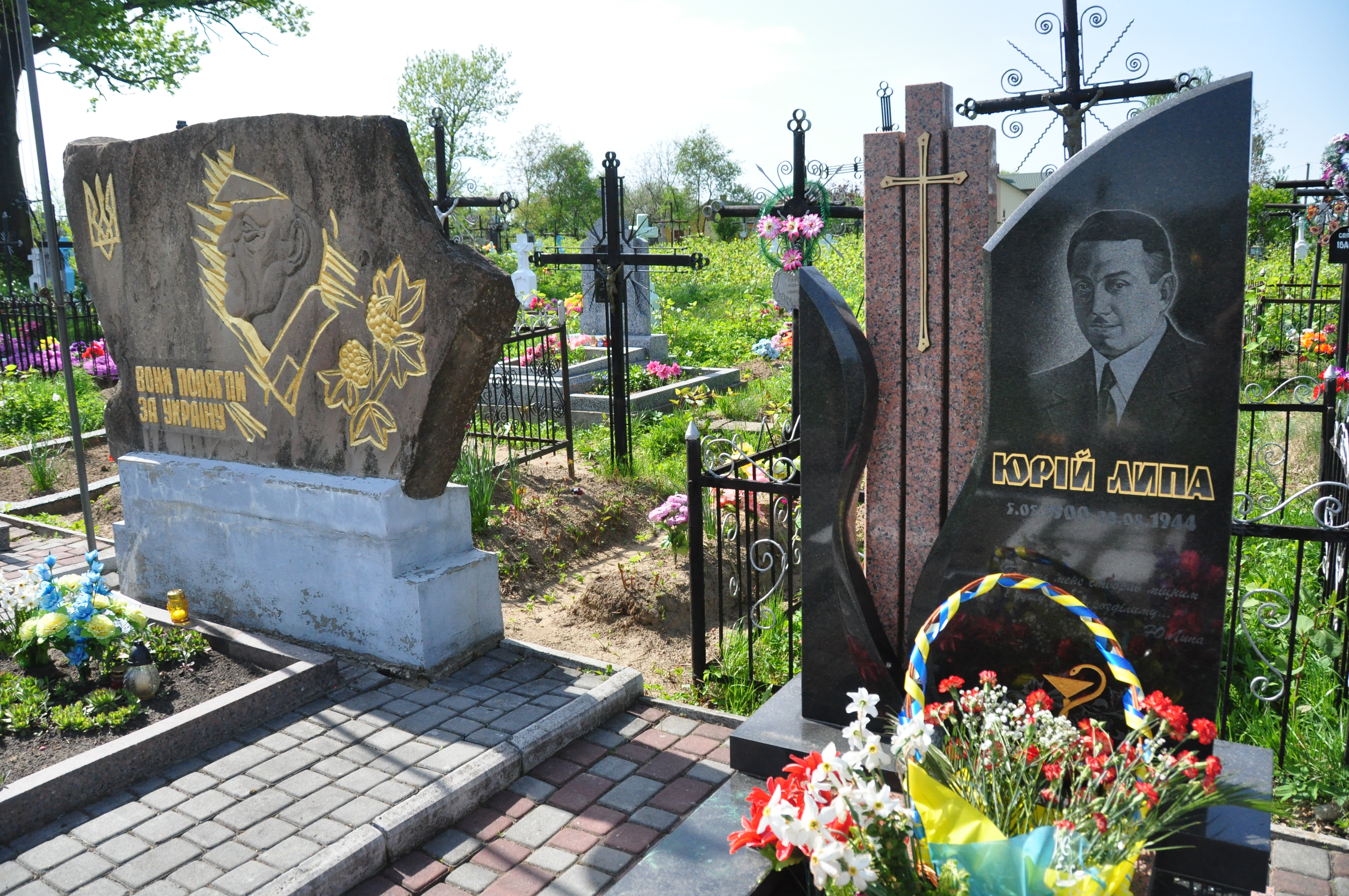
Lypa's grave at the Buniv Cemetery, Yavoriv Raion, Lviv Oblast

In 1937, Yurii Lypa married Halyna Zakhariasevych; they had two daughters.

In 1943, Lypa moved his family to the Yavoriv Raion in western Ukraine. He became an active participant in the Ukrainian resistance movement. While working as a doctor, Yurii Lypa also conducted training courses for medical staff from the Ukrainian Insurgent Army.

On 19 August 1944, NKVD officers apprehended Yurii Lypa. Two days later, his wife was informed that villagers had found her husband's corpse in the garbage tip near Shutova village. His entire body had been severely damaged and tortured.

== Bibliography ==
- 1917 – Liberation of Ukraine Union ("Soyuz vyzvolennia Ukrainy")
- 1918 – Kyivan Kingdom According to Bismarck's Project ("Korolivstvo Kyivske za proektom Bismarka")
- 1919 – Wear your Awards ("Nosit svoi vidznaky")
- 1920 – Hetman Ivan Mazepa ("Hetman Ivan Mazepa")
- 1925 – Serenity ('Svitlist')
- 1931 – Severity ('Suvorist')
- 1933 – Phytotherapy ('Phytotherapy')
- 1934 – Kozaks in Moskovia ('Kozaky v Moskovii')
- 1935 – Fight for Ukraine ('Biy za Ukrainu')
- 1936 – Notebook ('Notatnyk')
- 1936 – Ukrainian Age ('Ukrainska doba')
- 1936 – Ukrainian Race ('Ukrainska rasa')
- 1937 – Healing Herbs in Ancient and Modern Medicine ('Tsilyushchi roslyny v davniy I sychasniy medytsyni')
- 1938 – Cause of Ukraine ('Pryznachennya Ukrainy')
- 1938 – Race Solidarism ('Solidaryzm rasy')
- 1940 – The Black Sea Doctrine ('Chornomorska doktryna')
- 1941 – The Severance of Russia ('Rozpodil Rosii')
- 1943 – The Cure Beneath Our Feet ('Liky pid nohamy')
