= Perekhodivka =

Village in Chernihiv Oblast, Ukraine

Perekhodivka Переходівка
- Village
- Location within Chernihiv Oblast Location within Ukraine
- Coordinates: 51°12′12″N 31°32′25″E
- Country: Ukraine
- Oblast: Chernihiv Oblast
- Raion: Nizhyn Raion
- Hromada: Vertiivka rural hromada
- Elevation: 119 m (390 ft)

Population (2001)
  - Total: 264
- Time zone: UTC+2 (EET)
  - Summer (DST): UTC+3 (EEST)

Perekhodivka (Ukrainian: Переходівка) is a village in Nizhyn Raion of Chernihiv Oblast in Ukraine.

== Demographics ==
Native language as of the Ukrainian Census of 2001:

- Ukrainian 99.62%
- Others 0.38%

== Notable people ==
- Oleksandr Konysky (1836 – 1900), writer
