= Ukrainian Chorus Dumka of New York =

Ukrainian choir in New York City

- Choir
- Origin: New York City
- Founded: 1949
- Genre: Mixed choir; Children's choir
- Chief conductor: Vasyl Hrechynsky

Ukrainian Chorus Dumka of New York is a Ukrainian amateur chorus founded in New York City in 1949, dedicated to secular and sacred choral music from Ukraine. It has a mixed choir and a children's choir. They have performed mostly in New York, but also in Europe.

== History ==
Ukrainian Chorus Dumka of New York was founded in 1949 with the goal "to preserve and cultivate the rich musical heritage of Ukraine", both for the church and for secular occasions. In the beginning, the chorus was a men's chorus of Ukrainian immigrants who met to sing music they loved. The first music director was L. Krushelnycky. The group became a mixed choir in 1959.

They have performed in New York at locations including in Alice Tully Hall, Avery Fisher Hall, Brooklyn Academy of Music, Carnegie Hall, Madison Square Garden, St. Patrick's Cathedral, and Town Hall. They toured to the Kennedy Center in Washington, and in several European capitals. In 1990, the chorus toured Ukraine for the first time, singing in Kyiv, Lviv, Poltava, and Kaniv. They made recordings of both church and secular music.

Dumka celebrated their 70th anniversary at Hunter College on 6 October 2019, conducted by music director and conductor Vasyl Hrechynsky. The mixed chorus performed mostly Ukrainian classic choral compositions in the first section, and shorter Ukrainian folk songs and humorous works in the concluding section. The program also included the “Battle Hymn of the Republic” by Peter Wilhousky, an American of Ukrainian origin, who created English lyrics to Leontovych's "Shchedryk" ("Carol of the Bells"). The choir sang Verdi's Va, pensiero (Fly, my thoughts [on wings of gold]) from Nabucco, written when Italian patriots tried to unify their country, free from foreign control. The children's choir also performed, which unites children of all ages, teaching them Ukrainian folk songs, pop songs and religious works.

On 26 February 2022, two days after the 2022 Russian invasion of Ukraine began, the Ukrainian Chorus Dumka of New York conducted by Vasyl Hrechynsky performed the Ukrainian spiritual hymn "Prayer for Ukraine" live in the cold open of the Saturday Night Live episode hosted by former show writer John Mulaney with musical guest LCD Soundsystem, standing behind a table of votive candles that were arranged to spell "Kyiv".

== See also ==
- Dumka (musical genre)
