= Taras Brotherhood =

Secret organization of the Ukrainian national movement

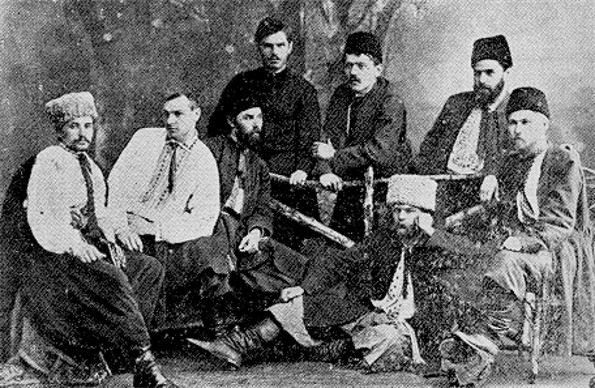
Brotherhood of Taras in Kharkiv

The Brotherhood of Tarasivtsi (Ukrainian: Братство тарасівців, Bratstvo tarasivtsiv), sometimes also translated into English as the Taras Brotherhood, was an underground student organization. It was established in 1891 during a visit to the Taras Shevchenko burial grounds near Kaniv.

The founders included Vitaliy Borovyk, Borys Hrinchenko, Mykola Mikhnovsky, Ivan Lypa, and others. Beside cultural propaganda Tarasovs were expressing political statements for the liberation of the Ukrainian nation from Russian occupation, full autonomy for all people of the Russian Empire, and social justice.

The Brotherhood was established in the small town of Hlynsk near Romny, where the students operated by the end of summer 1891. Among their beliefs and aims were:

- An independent sovereign Ukraine: united and undivided from San to Kuban, from the Carpathian Mountains to the Caucasus Mountains; free among the free, equal among the equal, and without a class stand-off in the future.
- Federation of Left-bank, Right-bank, Steppe Ukraine, Kuban and Galicia.
- The head of state is hetman as the president and seym as parliament.
- Freedom of religion, division between church and state, national army.
- We won't be ourselves, if for Ukraine there is no freedom nor fate.

The ideological fundamentals of the organization were prepared by Ivan Lypa and were published in Pravda magazine in April 1893. Those ideas were later propagated by B. Hrinchenko in his Letters from the Dnieper Ukraine and Mykhailo Kotsiubynsky in his fairy tale Kho.

In the summer of 1893, some members of the society were arrested in Kharkiv, but further centers reappeared in Kiev, Odessa, and Poltava among others. Prominent members of the Brotherhood were Volodymyr Samiylenko, Vasyl Sovachiv, Yevhen Tymchenko, Oleksandr Cherniakhivsky, Volodymyr Shemet. The organization was discontinued in 1898, but under its influence another organization, Stara Hromada reestablished itself as the General Ukrainian Organization in 1897 under the initiative of Oleksandr Konysky and Volodymyr Antonovych, while the younger generation of the Hromada created the Revolutionary Ukrainian Party in 1900.

== See also ==
- Ukrainian Democratic Party (1904)
- Brotherhood of Saints Cyril and Methodius

== Bibliography ==
- Encyclopedia of Ukraine in 10 volumes. Ed. Volodymyr Kubiyovych. Paris, New York City. "Molode Zhyttia", 1954-1989.
- Small dictionary of history of Ukraine. Ed. Valeriy Smoliy. Kiev. "Lybid", 1997.
- Ivan Lypa Тарасівці (Tarasivtsi). (Letter from Prosvita, parts 11-12). Lviv, 1922.
- Volodymyr Samiylenko. З українського життя в Києві в 80 pp. XIX ст (Out of the Ukrainian life in Kiev in 1880s). Nova Ukraina, vol. 1 — 2. Prague, 1923.
- S.Kozub. Коцюбинський у Братерстві Тарасівців (Kotsiubynsky in the Brotherhood of Tarasivtsi). Works of Kotsiubynsky, vol. 7. Kharkiv — Kiev, 1930 —1931.
- V. V. 45-ліття Тарасівців (45th anniversary of Tarasivtsi). Chronicles of Chervona Kalyna, vol. 1 — 2. Lviv, 1936.
- Братерство Тарасівців (Brotherhood of Tarasivtsi). Ukrainian Informer, vol. 15. Berlin, 1943.
