= Oleksandr Konysky =

Ukrainian nobleman

- Олександр Якович Кониський
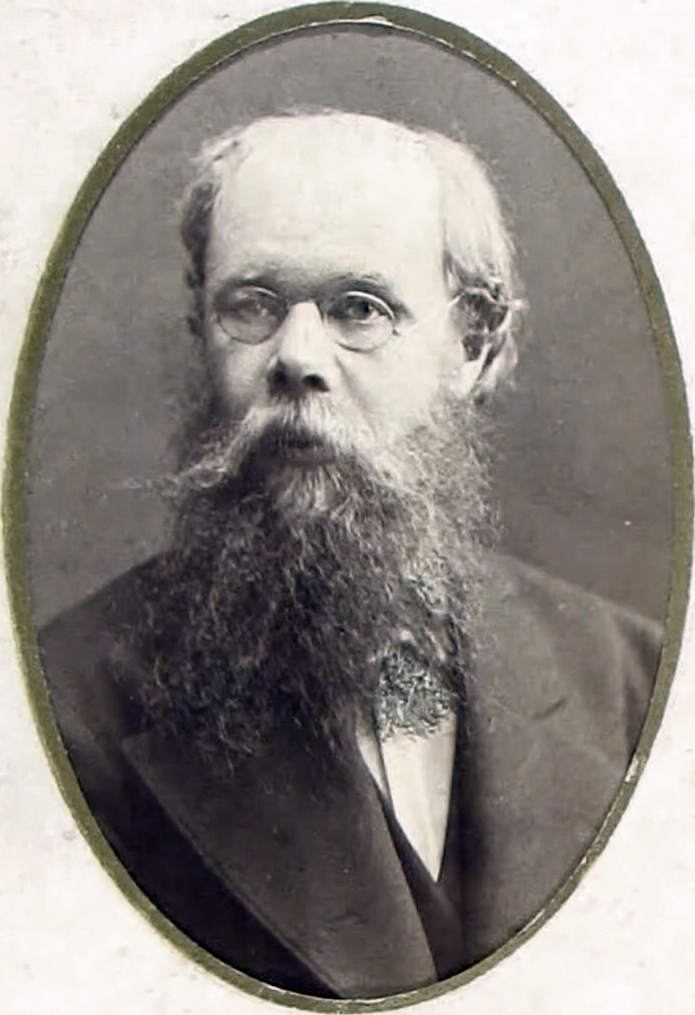
- Born: 18 August 1836; Perekhodivka, Nezhinsky Uyezd, Chernigov Governorate, Russian Empire
- Died: 12 December 1900 (aged 64); Kiev, Russian Empire
- Occupations: Interpreter; writer; lexicographer; pedagogue; poet; civil activist
- Writing career
- Language: Ukrainian
- Notable work: Prayer for Ukraine

Oleksandr Yakovych Konysky (Ukrainian: Олександр Якович Кониський; 18 August 1836 – 12 December 1900) was a Ukrainian interpreter, writer, lexicographer, pedagogue, poet, and civil activist of liberal direction. He had around 150 pen names, including О. Return-freedom (Ukrainian: Верниволя), F. Gorovenko, V. Burkun, Perebendia, and О. Khutorianyn.

By profession, he was a lawyer and is known as the author of the text of the Ukrainian spiritual anthem "Prayer for Ukraine".

== Early life ==
Konysky was born in the village of Perekhodivka, today in the district of Nizhyn, in the Chernihiv Oblast. He stemmed from an old family of the medieval Principality of Chernigov (see George Konissky). The future writer grew up in the city of Nizhyn, about which he wrote: "Nizhyn is a small city. At the same time, it was the center of enlightenment of the Chernihiv lands and the north of the Poltava lands. Here was located the Bezborodko Lyceum. Nizhyn has also had a glorious historic past, especially in trade, so among its people many have been distinguished".

== Career ==
Konysky’s first publication was in the Chernigovsky Listok in 1858. In Poltava and Kyiv he formed Sunday schools and wrote textbooks for them. Konysky was also the author of several church articles in local newspapers and was an active member of the Kyivan Hromada. As a member of the Kyiv City Council, he worked to introduce the Ukrainian language into the city's schools. Among his books and textbooks were Ukrainian writing (Ukrainian: Українські прописи 1862), Arithmetic, or Reckoning (1863), and Grammar or first reading for early students (Ukrainian: Граматка або перша читанка задля початку вченья 1882).

Konysky also had links with the Ukrainian activists of Halychyna, which led to his being accused of being a Little-Russian propaganda activist. In 1863, he was sent to Vologda, without receiving a trial. In 1871, his novel Don't give gold, don't beat with a hammer (Ukrainian: Не даруй золотом і не бий молотом) was confiscated and destroyed by the local police. From 1865 Konysky lived beyond the borders of the Russian Empire and came into closer contact with the Ukrainian activists of Halychyna. In 1872, after being released from police supervision, he returned to Kyiv, where he worked for the Kievskiy Telegraf. Konysky was one of the founders of the Shevchenko Scientific Society in Lviv in 1873 and later initiated its transformation into a society without commercial activity.

In 1887, together with Volodymyr Antonovych, and influenced by the Brotherhood of Tarasovs as a member of the Stara Hromada, Konysky led the creation of the All-Ukrainian Public Organization, a civil-political fellowship with the aim of uniting all circles of nationally conscious Ukrainians. As the organization's publication source, he founded the publishing firm Vik, which existed for fifteen years and released over 100 books in Ukrainian.

Konysky died in Kyiv in December 1900.

== See also ==
- Prayer for Ukraine
