= Ivan Lypa =

Ukrainian politician and physician (1865–1923)

- Іван Липа
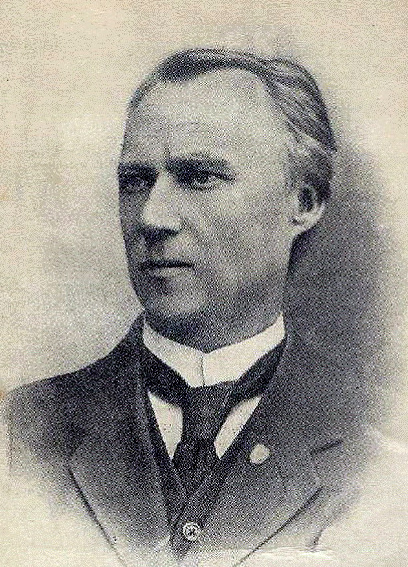

Personal details
- Born: Ivan Lvovych Lypa; 24 February 1865 Kerch, Taurida Governorate, Russian Empire
- Died: 13 November 1923 (aged 58) Vynnyky, Lviv Voivodeship, Second Polish Republic
- Education: Kazan University; Kharkiv University
- Occupation: political and social activist, ideologue, physician, writer, poet

Ivan Lvovych Lypa (Ukrainian: Іван Львович Липа; February 24, 1865 – November 13, 1923) was a Ukrainian physician and politician who served as Ukrainian minister of Religious Affairs. He was the father of another Ukrainian political leader and physician Yurii Lypa.

Ivan Lypa was born in Kerch, Taurida Governorate in a family of retired Imperial Russian army soldier, while his maternal line traces to Poltava region Cossacks who supported Ivan Mazepa. Ivan Lypa in a church-parochial school at the Greek John the Forerunner Church in Kerch. In 1878–1887 he studied at the Aleksandr Male Gymnasium in Kerch which he finished with excellence. During his gymnasium years Lypa became familiar with works of Russian thinkers Nikolay Chernyshevsky, Dmitry Pisarev, and Nikolay Dobrolyubov, becoming a convinced follower of Narodniks ideas.

Despite receiving excellence in his Matura student degree, Lypa was marked as an unreliable and received a grade of 4 (out of 5) for behavior and therefore was barred from enrolling in big cities universities. Originally being offered to enroll into the Imperial University of Dorpat Lypa declined and in 1888 enrolled into medical faculty of the Kharkiv University where he became acquainted with number of notable Kharkiv students like Borys Hrinchenko and Mykola Mikhnovskyi. Under influence from members of local Kharkiv hromada such as Dmytro Bahaliy, Oleksandr Katrenko, families of Rusov and Alchevsky, Lypa changed to purely Ukrainian national positions.

In the summer of 1891 invited by the Russian statistician Aleksandr Rusov to help with a real estate census of the Poltava Governorate, Lypa along with other Kharkiv University students Mykola Baizdrenko and Mykhailo Bazkevych as well as Kyiv student Vitaliy Borovyk visited the Taras Shevchenko Grave (Taras Hill) near Kaniv and created Ukrainian national underground political organization, the Taras Student Fraternity (Brotherhood of Taras). Following the brotherhood's suppression in 1893, Lypa was arrested. As a member of the Ukrainian Party of Socialist Independists, in 1917 Lypa was appointed to serve as the commissar of Odesa. In 1919 he served as the Minister of Religious Affairs of the Ukrainian People's Republic.

In 1922 Lypa moved to Vynnyky near Lviv, where he died one year later.

== Literary work ==
Under the pseudonyms Petro Shelest and Ivan Stepovyk, Lypa authored a number of poems, short stories, lyrical and philosophical texts, fairytales and memoirs. Some of them were published posthumously.
