= Ukrainian grammar =

Ukrainian grammar is complex and characterised by a high degree of inflection; moreover, it has a relatively free word order, although the dominant arrangement is subject–verb–object (SVO). Ukrainian grammar describes its phonological, morphological, and syntactic rules. Ukrainian has seven grammatical cases and two numbers for its nominal declension and two aspects, three tenses, three moods, and two voices for its verbal conjugation. Adjectives agree in number, gender, and case with their nouns.

To understand Ukrainian grammar, it is necessary to understand the various phonological rules that occur due to sequences of two or more sounds. This markedly decreases the number of exceptions and makes understanding the rules simpler. The origin of some of these phonological rules can be traced all the way back to Indo-European gradation (ablaut). This is especially common in explaining the differences between the infinitive and present stems of many verbs.

This article presents the grammar of standard Ukrainian, which is followed by most dialects. The main differences in the dialects are vocabulary with occasional differences in phonology and morphology. Further information can be found in the article Ukrainian dialects.

== Grammatical terminology ==
The following is a list of Ukrainian terms for properties and morphological categories, with their English translations or equivalents:

Category	Language	
Category	Ukrainian	English
Parts of speech (части́на мо́ви)	іме́нник	noun
Parts of speech (части́на мо́ви)	прикме́тник	adjective
Parts of speech (части́на мо́ви)	дієсло́во	verb
Parts of speech (части́на мо́ви)	числі́вник	numeral
Parts of speech (части́на мо́ви)	займе́нник	pronoun
Parts of speech (части́на мо́ви)	прислі́вник	adverb
Parts of speech (части́на мо́ви)	ча́стка	particle
Parts of speech (части́на мо́ви)	прийме́нник	preposition
Parts of speech (части́на мо́ви)	сполу́чник	conjunction
Parts of speech (части́на мо́ви)	ви́гук	interjection
Main cases (відмі́нок)	називни́й	nominative
Main cases (відмі́нок)	родови́й	genitive
Main cases (відмі́нок)	дава́льний	dative
Main cases (відмі́нок)	знахі́дний	accusative
Main cases (відмі́нок)	ору́дний	instrumental
Main cases (відмі́нок)	місце́вий	locative
Main cases (відмі́нок)	кли́чний	vocative
Number (число́)	однина́	singular
Number (число́)	множина́	plural
Degrees of comparison (ступенюва́ння)	звича́йний	positive
Degrees of comparison (ступенюва́ння)	ви́щий	comparative
Degrees of comparison (ступенюва́ння)	найви́щий	superlative
Genders (рід)	чолові́чий	masculine
Genders (рід)	жіно́чий	feminine
Genders (рід)	сере́дній	neuter
Tenses (час)	давномину́лий	pluperfect
Tenses (час)	мину́лий	past
Tenses (час)	тепе́рішній	present
Tenses (час)	майбу́тній	future
Moods (спо́сіб)	ді́йсний	indicative
Moods (спо́сіб)	умо́вний	conditional
Moods (спо́сіб)	наказо́вий	imperative

== Phonology ==
The following points of Ukrainian phonology need to be considered to understand the grammar of the Ukrainian language.

=== Classification of vowels ===
Two different classifications of vowels can be made: a historical perspective and a modern perspective. From a historical perspective, the Ukrainian vowels can be divided into two categories:

1. Hard vowels (in Cyrillic: а, и (from Common Slavic *ы), о, and у or transliterated as a, y (from Common Slavic *y), o, and u)
2. Soft vowels (in Cyrillic: е, і and и (from Common Slavic *и) or transliterated as e, i and y (from Common Slavic *i)). The iotated vowels are considered to be soft vowels

From a modern perspective, the Ukrainian vowels can be divided into two categories:

1. Hard vowels (in Cyrillic: а, е, и, і, о, and у or transliterated as a, e, y, i, o, and u). This category as can be seen from the table is different from the historical hard category
2. Iotated vowels (in Cyrillic: я, є, ї, and ю or transliterated as ya, ye, yi, and yu). To this category can also be added the combination of letters йо/ьо (transliterated as yo)

=== Classification of consonants ===
In Ukrainian, consonants can be categorized as follows:

- Labials (in Cyrillic: б, в, м, п, and ф or transliterated as b, v, m, p, and f) are almost always hard in Ukrainian (there are orthographic exceptions), can never be doubled or in general be followed by an iotated vowel (exception: in combinations CL where C is a dental and L is a labial, a soft vowel can follow, e.g., свято).
- Post-alveolar sibilants (in Cyrillic: ж, ч, and ш or transliterated as zh, ch, and sh. The digraph щ (shch) should also be included) were in Common Slavic all palatal (soft). They hardened in Ukrainian, leading to the creation of the mixed declension of nouns. They can't be followed by a soft sign (in Cyrillic: ь; transliterated as apostrophe (’)) or any iotated vowel. All but the digraph щ can be doubled, in which case they can be followed by a soft vowel, e.g., збі́жжя.
- Dentals (in Cyrillic: д, з, л, н, с, т, and ц or transliterated as d, z, l, n, s, t, and ts) can be both hard and soft in Ukrainian, as in Common Slavic. These letters can never (unless they are the last letter in a prefix) be followed by an apostrophe. Furthermore, these letters can be doubled.
- Alveolar (in Cyrillic: р or transliterated as r) can be either hard or soft but is always hard at the end of a syllable. Therefore, r is always hard at the end of a word and is never followed by a soft sign. r can never be doubled, except in foreign words (such as сюрреалізм).
- Velars (in Cyrillic: г, ґ, к, and х or transliterated as h, g, k, and kh) are always hard in both Ukrainian and Common Slavic. If an iotated or soft vowel are to follow them, they undergo the first and second palatalizations. Hence, these letters can never be doubled or followed by an apostrophe.

=== Historical changes ===
In Ukrainian, the following sound changes have occurred between the Common Slavic period and current Ukrainian:

1. In a newly closed syllable, that is, a syllable that ends in a consonant, Common Slavic o and e mutate into i if the next vowel in Common Slavic was one of the yers (ь/ĭ and ъ/ŭ).
2. Pleophony: The Common Slavic combinations, ToRT and TeRT, where T is any consonant and R is either r or l become in Ukrainian.
  1. TorT gives ToroT (Common Slavic *borda gives Ukrainian borodá)
  2. TolT gives ToloT (Common Slavic *bolto gives Ukrainian bolóto)
  3. TerT gives TereT (Common Slavic *berza gives Ukrainian beréza)
  4. TelT gives ToloT (Common Slavic *melko gives Ukrainian molokó)
3. The Common Slavic nasal vowel ę, derived from an Indo-European *-en, *-em, or one of the sonorants n and m, is reflected as я except after a single labial where it is reflected as 'я, or after a post-alveolar sibilant where it is reflected as a. For example,
  1. Common Slavic *pętь gives in Ukrainian п'ять;
  2. Common Slavic *telę gives in Ukrainian теля́;
  3. Common Slavic kurčę gives in Ukrainian курча́.
4. The Common Slavic letter, ě (ѣ), is reflected in Ukrainian generally as i except:
  1. word-initially, where it is reflected as yi: Common Slavic *ěsti gives the Ukrainian ї́сти
  2. after the post-alveolar sibilants where it is reflected as a: Common Slavic *ležěti gives the Ukrainian лежа́ти
5. Common Slavic i and y are both reflected in Ukrainian as y
6. The Common Slavic combination -CьjV, where C is any consonant and V is any vowel, becomes in Ukrainian the following combination -CCjV, except
  1. if C is labial or 'r' where it becomes -C"jV
  2. if V is the Common Slavic e, then the vowel in Ukrainian mutates to a, e.g., Common Slavic *žitьje gives the Ukrainian життя́
  3. if V is the Common Slavic ь, then the combination becomes ei, e.g., genitive plural in Common Slavic *myšьjь gives the Ukrainian мише́й
  4. if one or more consonants precede the C then there is no doubling of the consonants in Ukrainian
7. Common Slavic combinations dl and tl are simplified to l, for example, Common Slavic *mydlo gives Ukrainian ми́ло
8. Common Slavic ъl and ьl became ov, while word final lъ became v. For example, Common Slavic *vьlkъ becomes вовк in Ukrainian

=== Current changes ===
1. The first palatalization concerns the velars and the following vowels: e, y from Common Slavic i, a/i from Common Slavic ě, derived from the Indo-European ē. Before these vowels,
  1. г/ґ mutates into ж.
  2. к mutates into ч.
  3. х mutates into ш.
2. The second palatalization concerns the velars and the following vowels: y from Common Slavic i that is derived from an Indo-European diphthong and a/i from Common Slavic ě, derived from an Indo-European diphthong. Before these vowels,
  1. г/ґ mutates into з.
  2. к mutates into ц.
  3. х mutates into с.
3. The iotation concerns all consonants and the semi-vowel й. The following changes occur:
  1. The labials insert an l between the labial and the semivowel: Common Slavic *zemja gives Ukrainian земля́.
  2. The velars followed by a semivowel mutate as in the first palatalization. The semivowel is dropped. This change can be traced back to Common Slavic.
  3. кть, ть becomes ч
  4. дь becomes ж, except in verbs where it becomes дж
  5. шь becomes ш
  6. шть, шкь become щ
  7. ждь, жь become ждж
  8. жкь becomes жч
  9. л, н, р becomes ль, нь, рь
4. In Ukrainian, when two or more consonants occur word-finally, then a float vowel is inserted under the following conditions. Given a consonantal grouping C_{1}(ь)C_{2}(ь), where C is any Ukrainian consonant. The fill vowel is inserted between the two consonants and after the ь. A fill vowel is only inserted if C_{2} is one of the following consonants: к, в, л, м, р, н and ц. In this case:
  1. If C_{1} is one of the following г, к, х, then the fill vowel is always o
  2. If C_{2} is к or в, then the fill vowel is o. No fill vowel is inserted if the v is derived from a voiced l, for example, вовк
  3. If C_{2} is л, м, р or ц, then the fill vowel is e
  4. The only known exception is відьом, which should take e as the fill vowel, but instead adds an o
  5. The combinations, -ств and -ськ are not broken up
  6. If the C_{1} is й, then the above rules can apply. However, both forms (with and without the fill vowel) often exist

=== Assimilation ===
The following assimilations occur:

- Before the с of a suffix (-ський or -ство)
  - If the root ends in г (ґ), ж, or з, then it mutates to з and the с of the suffix is lost.
  - If the root ends in к, ч, or ц, then it mutates to ц and the с of the suffix is lost.
  - If the root ends in х, с, or ш, then it mutates to с and the с of the suffix is lost (or the last letter of the root drops out).
- The following combinations of letters change:
  - {ж, з} + дн is contracted to {ж, з} + н.
  - ст + {л, н} is contracted to с + {л, н}.
  - {п, р} + тн is contracted to {п, р} + н.
  - {с, к} + кн is contracted to {с, к} + н.

=== Dissimilation ===
The most common dissimilation (dating back to Proto-Slavic) is encountered in the infinitive of verbs, where {д, т} + т dissimilates to ст, for example, крад + ти gives красти and плет + ти gives плести.

== Morphology ==
=== Nominal ===
==== Nouns ====
The nominal declension has seven cases (nominative, genitive, dative, accusative, instrumental, locative, and vocative), in two numbers (singular and plural), and absolutely obeying grammatical gender (masculine, feminine and neuter). Adjectives, pronouns, and the first two cardinal numbers have gender specific forms.

===== Number =====
In Ukrainian, all the words in a specific context must agree in number (just like case and gender), i.e. when the noun is written in the plural number, the adjective must also be written in the plural number. Examples:

Grammatical number
Singular	English translation	Plural	English translation
Masculine
Гарний (adj.) пагорб (noun)	A beautiful hill	Гарні (adj.) пагорби (noun)	Beautiful hills
Feminine
Біла (adj.) тварина (noun)	A white animal	Білі (adj.) тварини (noun)	White animals
Neuter
Великe (adj.) дерево (noun)	A big tree	Великі (adj.) дерева (noun)	Big trees

A third number, the dual, also existed in Old East Slavic, but except for its use in the nominative and accusative cases with the numbers two, three and four, e.g. дві гривні vs. двоє гривень (recategorized today as a nominative plural), it has been lost. Other traces of the dual can be found when referring to objects of which are commonly in pairs: eyes, shoulders, ears, e.g. плечима (from плечі). Occasionally, dual forms can distinguish between meanings.

===== Cases =====
The Ukrainian language has seven different grammatical cases, of which every case has its own function.

Case	Example	Approximate translation (function)
Nominative	мова	the language (subject)
Genitive	мови	of the language
Dative	мові	to the language
Accusative	мову	the language (object)
Instrumental	мовою	with (through) the language
Locative	мові	on the language (location)
Vocative	мово	language (addressing someone)

===== Genders =====
Like other Slavic languages and Latin, Ukrainian does not have articles, so a word's gender is mainly determined with its ending. Although exceptions always exist, one can mostly determine a word's gender by knowing some of the typical endings.

Typical Ukrainian endings (nominative)
Gender	Singular	Example	Plural	Example
Masculine	∅ (no ending) (1)	вітер, парк	-и	вітри, парки
Masculine	∅ (no ending) (1)	хлопець, камінь	-і (2)	хлопці, камені
Feminine	-а	кава, церква	-и	кави, церкви
Feminine	-я	воля, земля	-і (3)	волі, землі
Neuter	-о	дерево, село	-а	дерева, села
Neuter	-е	море, серце	-я	моря, серця

Notes:

- (1) Words ending on a consonant (вітер) or soft sign (камінь).
- (2) The plural ending -і is used for words that end on a soft letter, in this case the soft sign (sg. хлопець, pl. хлопці).
- (3) The plural ending -і is used for words that end on a soft letter, in this case -я (sg. земля, pl. землі). Additionally, the ending -ї is used when the letter before the soft letter is a vowel (sg. поліція, pl. поліції).

Further (exceptional) Ukrainian endings (nominative)
Gender	Singular	Example	Reason
Masculine	-а	Микола, Микита (male names)	Specifically refers to the male gender (e.g. professions, male names, animals), i.e. the ending is not important in this case
Masculine	-о	батько, тато	Specifically refers to the male gender (e.g. professions, male names, animals), i.e. the ending is not important in this case
Feminine	-ість	радість, ніжність, гідність, бідність	Abstract nouns (conceptual things that cannot be sensed)
Neuter	Doubled consonants + я	кохання, налаштування, завдання, життя, насилля, весілля	Nominalization (verbs converted into nouns), e.g. кохання (noun, "love") from кохати (verb, "to love")

===== Declensions =====
In Ukrainian, there are 4 declension types. The first declension is used for most feminine nouns. The second declension is used for most masculine and neuter nouns. The third declension is used for feminine nouns ending in ь or a post-alveolar sibilant. The fourth declension is used for neuter nouns ending in -а/-я (Common Slavic *ę).

Most of the types consist of 3 different subgroups: hard, mixed, and soft. The soft subgroup consists of nouns whose roots end in a soft letter (followed by iotated vowel or soft vowel). The mixed subgroup consists of the nouns whose roots end in a post-alveolar sibilant or occasionally r. The hard group consists of all other nouns.

If the hard group endings are taken as the basis, then the following rules can be used to derive the corresponding mixed and soft endings:

- Mixed subgroup: Following a post-alveolar sibilant,
  1. All о change to е
  2. All и change to і
- Soft subgroup: Whenever a soft sign or the semi-vowel encounters the vowel of the ending, the following changes occur (These are mainly orthographic changes, but same can be traced to similar changes in Common Slavic):
  1. ьа or йа gives я
  2. ьо gives е
  3. йе gives є
  4. ьи gives і
  5. йи gives ї
  6. ьу or йу gives ю
  7. ьі gives і
  8. йі gives ї

Nouns ending in a consonant are marked in the following tables with ∅ (no ending).

====== First declension ======
This declension consists of nouns that end in -а or -я. It consists primarily of feminine nouns, but a few nouns with these ending referring to professions can be either masculine or feminine. In these cases, the genitive plural is often formed by adding -ів. Nouns referring to people can also take this ending.

First declension: Feminine nouns
Singular
	Hard	Mixed	Soft (ь)	Soft (й)
Nominative	-а	-а	-я	-я
Genitive	-и	-і	-і	-ї
Dative (1)	-і	-і	-і	-ї
Accusative	-у	-у	-ю	-ю
Instrumental	-ою	-ею	-ею	-єю
Locative (1)	-і	-і	-і	-ї
Vocative	-о	-е	-е	-є
Plural
	Hard	Mixed	Soft (ь)	Soft (й)
Nominative	-и	-і	-і	-ї
Genitive (2)	∅	∅	-ь	-й
Dative	-ам	-ам	-ям	-ям
Accusative (3)	-и / ∅	-і / ∅	-і / -ь	-ї / -й
Instrumental	-ами	-ами	-ями	-ями
Locative	-ах	-ах	-ях	-ях
Vocative	-и	-і	-і	-ї

- (1) A velar consonant undergoes the appropriate second palatalization changes.
- (2) If two or more consonants are left at the end of the word, then a fill vowel may be inserted.
- (3) The genitive form is used for all animate nouns, while inanimate nouns take the nominative form.

====== Second declension ======
The second declension consists of masculine and neuter nouns.

Masculine nouns: This group consists primarily of nouns ending in a consonant, a soft sign -ь, or -й. In this declension, nouns ending in р can belong to any of the three declension subgroups: hard, mixed, and soft. There is no way of knowing from the nominative form alone to which group the noun belongs.

Second declension: Masculine nouns
Singular
	Hard	Mixed	Soft (ь)	Soft (й)
Nominative	∅	∅	-ь / ∅ (1)	-й
Genitive (2)	-а / -у	-а / -у	-я / -ю	-я / -ю
Dative (3)	-ові / -у	-еві / -у	-еві / -ю	-єві / -ю
Accusative (4)	∅ / -а	∅ / -а	-ь / -я	-й / -я
Instrumental	-ом	-ем	-ем	-єм
Locative (5)	-ові / -і / -у	-еві / -і	-еві / -і	-єві / -ї
Vocative (6)	-у / -е	-е / -у	-ю	-ю
Plural
	Hard	Mixed	Soft (ь)	Soft (й)
Nominative	-и	-і	-і	-ї
Genitive	-ів	-ів	-ів / -ей (7)	-їв
Dative	-ам	-ам	-ям	-ям
Accusative (4)	-и / -ів	-і / -ів	-і / -ів	-ї / -їв
Instrumental	-ами	-ами	-ями	-ями
Locative	-ах	-ах	-ях	-ях
Vocative	-и	-і	-і	-ї

Notes:

- (1) Only with soft nouns ending in -р.
- (2) The ending to be used depends on the nature of the noun. The following rules are given in the Ukrainian orthography:
  - Use the ending -а with
    1. Names of professions, people's names (first and last)
    2. Names of plants and animals
    3. Names of objects
    4. Names of settlements and geographic places
    5. Names of measuring units
    6. Names of machines
    7. Words of foreign origin, which describe geometric parts, concrete objects.
  - Use the ending -у with
    1. Chemical elements, materials (note a few exceptions)
    2. Collective nouns
    3. Names of buildings and their parts
    4. Names of organizations and their places
    5. Natural phenomena
    6. Feelings
    7. Names of processes, states, phenomena of social life (both concrete and abstract)
    8. Names of foreign origin that denote physical or chemical processes
    9. Names of games and dances
- (3) The ending in -ові is preferred for animate masculine nouns.
- (4) The accusative case for animate nouns is identical to the genitive case; for inanimate nouns, it is identical to the nominative.
- (5) Velar-root nouns generally take the -у ending, thus avoiding the second palatalization. For non-velar roots, both -і and -ові types are acceptable. As usual, the -і ending triggers the second palatalization.
- (6) If the ending -е is used, then the first palatalization occurs. However, it can be avoided by using the -у form.
- (7) The second ending occurs in a small group of nouns.

Neuter nouns: This category consists of neuter nouns ending in -о, -е, and substantives ending in я, preceded by either a double consonant, apostrophe, or two consonants, which primarily are derived from verbs. This last category once did end in *ĭjе, but due to the sound change given above developed an -я ending.

Second declension: Neuter nouns
Singular
	Hard	Mixed	Soft	Soft (*ĭjе)
Nominative	-о	-е	-е	-я
Genitive	-а	-а	-я	-я
Dative	-у	-у	-ю	-ю
Accusative	-о	-е	-е	-я
Instrumental	-ом	-ем	-ем	-ям
Locative (1)	-і	-і	-і	-і
Vocative	-о	-е	-е	-я
Plural
	Hard	Mixed	Soft	Soft (*ĭjе)
Nominative	-а	-а	-я	-я
Genitive	∅	∅	-ь	-ь / ∅ (2)
Dative	-ам	-ам	-ям	-ям
Accusative	-а	-а	-я	-я
Instrumental	-ами	-ами	-ями	-ями
Locative	-ах	-ах	-ях	-ях
Vocative	-а	-а	-я	-я

- (1) As necessary, the second palatalization occurs, except for the *ĭjе nouns.
- (2) The double consonant is made single if the ь is used. However, if a post-alveolar sibilant is the last consonant, then no ь is used, but a single consonant is also written. For a labial final consonant, the ending is -'їв. Finally, monosyllabic nouns take the ending -ів. If two or more consonants appear word finally, then it is possible that a fill vowel must be inserted.

====== Third declension ======
This declension consists solely of feminine nouns that end in a consonant, as well as the noun ма́ти ("mother"). This declension has only 2 subgroups: a mixed and a soft group.

Third declension
Singular
	Soft	Mixed
Nominative	-ь	∅
Genitive	-і	-і
Dative	-і	-і
Accusative	-ь	∅
Instrumental (1)	-ю	-ю
Locative	-і	-і
Vocative	-e	-e
Plural
	Soft	Mixed
Nominative	-і	-і
Genitive	-ей	-ей
Dative	-ям	-ам
Accusative	-і	-і
Instrumental	-ями	-ами
Locative	-ях	-ах
Vocative	-і	-і

- (1) Since this ending is derived from the Common Slavic ending *-ĭjǫ, doubling of the consonant occurs as per the rules outlined above. Furthermore, if in the nominative form the noun has an -і for an -о, then so will the instrumental form, for example, ніччю (instrumental singular) and ніч (nominative singular).

====== Fourth declension ======
This declension consists of solely neuter nouns that are derived from Common Slavic *ę. There are two subgroups: those with an н insert, and those with a т insert.

Fourth declension
Singular
	(н)	(т)
Nominative	ім'я́	теля́
Genitive	і́мені, ім'я́	теля́ти
Dative	і́мені, ім'ю́	теля́ті
Accusative	ім'я́	теля́
Instrumental	і́менем, ім'я́м	теля́м
Locative	і́мені, ім'ю́	теля́ті
Vocative	ім'я́	теля́
Plural
	(н)	(т)
Nominative	імена́	теля́та
Genitive	іме́н	теля́т
Dative	імена́м	теля́там
Accusative (1)	імена́	теля́та / теля́т
Instrumental	імена́ми	теля́тами
Locative	імена́х	теля́тах
Vocative	імена́	теля́та

- (1) In the "т" insert column, the first word is used for inanimate accusative nouns while the second is used for animate accusative nouns.

====== Indeclinable nouns ======
Several nouns, mostly borrowings from other languages (especially from different language groups) and abbreviations, are not modified when they change number and case. This occurs especially when the ending appears not to match any declension pattern in the appropriate gender. Some of the most common indeclinable nouns are:

Indeclinable nouns
Ukrainian	Romanization	English
відео	video	video
радіо	radio	radio
казино	kazyno	casino
какао	kakao	cacao
бюро	biuro	bureau
кіно	kino	cinema
ТОВ	TOV	Private limited company

However, there are some exceptions. Some nouns may sound like they are a part of the indeclinable declension, but in reality they should be declined normally. Examples are the words пальто ("coat") and вино ("wine"), which belong to the neuter gender.

==== Adjectives ====
Ukrainian adjectives agree with the nouns they modify in gender, number, and case.

In Ukrainian, there exist a small number of adjectives, primarily possessives, which exist in the masculine in the so-called short form. This "short" form is a relic of the indefinite declension of adjectives in Common Slavic. Common examples of this anomalous declension are бабин (masculine) compared to бабина (feminine); братів (masculine) compared to братова (feminine); and повинен (masculine) compared to повинна. This short form only exists in the masculine nominative form. All other forms are regular.

===== Declension =====
In Ukrainian, for adjectives there are 2 different declension types: hard and soft. The soft type can be further subdivided into two types. Unlike for the nouns, the post-alveolar sibilants are counted as hard. There also exists a special mixed declension for adjectives ending in -лиций. These adjectives are derived from the noun лице, describing types of faces, for example, білолиций.

Hard declension (-ий) of adjectives
	Singular			Plural
	Masculine	Neuter	Feminine	Plural
Nominative	-ий	-е	-а	-і
Genitive	-ого	-ого	-ої	-их
Dative	-ому	-ому	-ій	-им
Accusative (1)	-ий / -ого	-е	-у	-і / -их
Instrumental	-им	-им	-ою	-ими
Locative (2)	-ім / -ому	-ім / -ому	-ій	-их

Soft declension (-ій) of adjectives
	Singular			Plural
	Masculine	Neuter	Feminine	Plural
Nominative	-ій	-є	-я	-і
Genitive	-ього	-ього	-ьої	-іх
Dative	-ьому	-ьому	-ій	-ім
Accusative (1)	-ій / -ього	-є	-ю	-і / -іх
Instrumental	-ім	-ім	-ьою	-іми
Locative (2)	-ім / -ьому	-ім / -ьому	-ій	-іх

Soft declension (-їй) of adjectives
	Singular			Plural
	Masculine	Neuter	Feminine	Plural
Nominative	-їй	-є	-я	-ї
Genitive	-його	-його	-йої	-їх
Dative	-йому	-йому	-їй	-їм
Accusative (1)	-їй / -його	-є	-ю	-ї / -їх
Instrumental	-їм	-їм	-йою	-їми
Locative (2)	-їм / -йому	-їм / -йому	-їй	-їх

Mixed declension (-лиций) of Adjectives
	Singular			Plural
	Masculine	Neuter	Feminine	Plural
Nominative	-лиций	-лице	-лиця	-лиці
Genitive	-лицього	-лицього	-лицьої	-лицих
Dative	-лицьому	-лицьому	-лицій	-лицим
Accusative (1)	-лицій / -лицього	-лице	-лицю	-лиці / -лицих
Instrumental	-лицим	-лицим	-лицьою	-лицими
Locative (2)	-лицім / -лицьому	-лицим / -лицьому	-лицій	-лицих

Note about the declensions:

- (1) In the accusative case (except the feminine singular and the neuter singular), a difference is made between animate (genitive) and inanimate (nominative) adjectives.
- (2) The ending in -ому is more often encountered. The other form is a relic of the indefinite declension of adjectives in Common Slavic.

===== Other forms of the adjective (comparative and superlative) =====
In Ukrainian adjectives also have comparative and superlative forms.

The comparative form is created by dropping ий and adding the ending -(і)ший (less frequently -жчий and -щий). The resulting form is declined like a regular hard stem adjective.

The superlative form is created by prefixing най- to the comparative form. Words associated with religion often add the prefix пре- (very) to the comparative form.

Positive	Comparative	Superlative
довгий	довший	найдовший
грубий	грубший	найгрубший
гарний	гарніший	найгарніший
низький	нижчий	найнижчий

====== Irregular forms ======
Some adjectives, although also many of the important ones, have irregular forms.

Positive	Comparative	Superlative
великий	більший	найбільший
малий	менший	найменший
поганий	гірший	найгірший
добрий	кращий	найкращий

==== Adverbs ====
In Ukrainian, adverbs are formed by taking the stem of the adjective (that is dropping the -а from the feminine nominative singular form; forms ending in -я are replaced by -ьа (after consonants) or -йа (after vowels), before dropping the -а) and adding the ending

- -о, is the general ending,
- -е, can be used for some stems that are hard (no ь or й at the end), for example, добре from добрий. This is very common for the comparative form of the adjective.

For example, гарний gives гарно. The comparative and superlative forms of an adverb are formed by taking the corresponding form of the adjective and replacing -ий by -е, for example, гарніше from гарніший.

Adverbs can also be derived from the locative or instrumental singular of a noun, for example, ввечері (from в plus the locative of вечера), нагорі (from на plus the locative of гора).

==== Pronouns ====
===== Personal pronouns =====
The personal pronouns are declined as follows.

	1st sg.	2nd sg.	3rd sg. m.	3rd sg. f.	3rd sg. n.	1st pl.	2nd pl.	3rd pl.	reflexive
Nominative	я	ти	він	вона	воно	ми	ви	вони	/
Genitive	мене	тeбе	його / нього	її / неї	його / нього	нас	вас	їх / них	себе
Dative	мені	тобі	йому	їй	йому	нам	вам	їм	собі
Accusative	мене	тебе	його	її	його	нас	вас	їх / них	себе
Instrumental	мною	тобою	ним	нею	ним	нами	вами	ними	собою
Locative	мені	тобі	ньому / нім	ній	ньому / нім	наc	вас	них	собі

===== Demonstrative pronouns =====
The demonstrative pronouns той (that) and цей (this) are declined as follows (N or G refers to respectively nominative or genitive. Usually, animate subjects take the genitive form, while inanimate subjects take the nominative form).

	masculine	neuter	feminine	plural
Nominative	той	те	та	ті
Genitive	того	того	тієї	тих
Dative	тому	тому	тій	тим
Accusative	N or G	те	ту	N or G
Instrumental	тим	тим	тією	тими
Locative	тому / тім	тому / тім	тій	тих

	masculine	neuter	feminine	plural
Nominative	цей	це	ця	ці
Genitive	цього	цього	цієї	цих
Dative	цьому	цьому	цій	цим
Accusative	N or G	це	цю	N or G
Instrumental	цим	цим	цією	цими
Locative	цьому / цім	цьому / цім	цій	цих

===== Possessive pronouns =====
The first (мій) and second person (твій) singular possessive pronouns are declined similarly as can be seen from the table below.

Case		masculine	neuter	feminine	plural	masculine	neuter	feminine	plural
Nominative		мій	моє	моя	мої	твій	твоє	твоя	твої
Genitive		мого		моєї	моїх	твого		твоєї	твоїх
Dative		моєму		моїй	моїм	твоєму		твоїй	твоїм
Accusative	Animate	мого	моє	мою	моїх	твого	твоє	твою	твоїх
Accusative	Inanimate	мій	моє	мою	мої	твій	твоє	твою	твої
Instrumental		моїм		моєю	моїми	твоїм		твоєю	твоїми
Locative		моєму		моїй	моїх	твоєму		твоїй	твоїх

The first (наш) and second (ваш) person plural possessive pronouns are declined as below. The masculine nominative forms are the short forms.

Case		masculine	neuter	feminine	plural	masculine	neuter	feminine	plural
Nominative		наш	наше	наша	наші	ваш	ваше	ваша	ваші
Genitive		нашого		нашої	наших	вашого		вашої	ваших
Dative		нашому		нашій	нашим	вашому		вашій	вашим
Accusative	Animate	нашого	наше	нашу	наших	вашого	ваше	вашу	ваших
Accusative	Inanimate	наш	наше	нашу	наші	ваш	ваше	вашу	ваші
Instrumental		нашим		нашою	нашими	вашим		вашою	вашими
Locative		нашому		нашій	наших	вашому		вашій	ваших

The third person plural possessive pronoun, їхній, is declined as a normal soft adjective.

===== Interrogative pronouns =====
The interrogative pronouns, хто and що, are declined as follows.

Nom.	Gen.	Dat.	Acc.	Inst.	Loc.
хто	кого	кому	кого	ким	кому
що	чого	чому	що	чим	чому

The interrogative pronoun, чий, is declined as given in the table below.

	masculine	neuter	feminine	plural
Nominative	чий	чиє	чия	чиї
Genitive	чийого		чиєї	чиїх
Dative	чиєму		чиїй	чиїм
Accusative	N or G	чиє	чию	N or G
Instrumental	чиїм		чиєю	чиїми
Locative	чийому		чиїй	чиїх

==== Numbers ====
(The "Adverbial" column corresponds to English once, twice, thrice, four times, etc.)

Symbol	Cardinal	Ordinal	Adverbial
0	нуль	нульовий	ні разу
1	один, одна, одне	перший	раз
2	два, дві	другий	двічі
3	три	третій	тричі
4	чотири	четвертий	чотири рази
5	п'ять	п'ятий	п'ять разів
6	шість	шостий	шість разів
7	сім	сьомий	сім разів
8	вісім	восьмий	вісім разів
9	дев'ять	дев'ятий	дев'ять разів
10	десять	десятий	десять разів
teens (1)	cardinal+надцять	cardinal+надцятий	cardinal+надцять разів
20	двадцять	двадцятий	двадцять разів
21	двадцять один	двадцять перший	двадцять один раз
30	тридцять	тридцятий	тридцять разів
40	сорок	сороковий	сорок разів
50	п'ятдесят	п'ятдесятий	п'ятдесят разів
60	шістдесят	шістдесятий	шістдесят разів
70	сімдесят	сімдесятий	сімдесят разів
80	вісімдесят	вісімдесятий	вісімдесят разів
90	дев'яносто	дев'яностий	дев'яносто разів
100	сто	сотий	сто разів
200	двісті	двохсотий	двісті разів
300	триста	трьохсотий	триста разів
400	чотириста	чотирьохсотий	чотириста разів
500	п'ятсот	п'ятисотий	п'ятсот разів
600	шістсот	шестисотий	шістсот разів
700	сімсот	семисотий	сімсот разів
800	вісімсот	восьмисотий	вісімсот разів
900	дев'ятсот	дев'ятисотий	дев'ятсот разів
1000	тисяча	тисячний	тисяча разів

Comments:

- (1) Any soft signs are dropped if they occur word finally in the original cardinal number.
- (2) This is a dual construction.
- (3) This is a plural nominative construction.
- (4) This is the genitive plural construction (all hundreds after 500 are created so).

In general, the following rules are used to determine agreement between the cardinal number and a noun. In the nominative case, the nouns agree with the last number in any compound number. Nouns that must agree with a number ending in 2, 3, or 4 are in the nominative plural, but retain the stress of the dual, that is the genitive singular. Nouns, which must agree with a number ending in 5, 6, 7, 8, 9, 0, and all the teens are in the genitive plural. In any other case, the nouns and numbers are in the same case.

=== Verbs ===
Grammatical conjugation is subject to three persons in two numbers and three simple tenses (present/future, future, and past), with periphrastic forms for the future and conditional, as well as imperative forms and present/past participles, distinguished by adjectival and adverbial usage. There are two voices, active and middle/passive, which is constructed by the addition of a reflexive suffix -ся/-сь to the active form. An interesting feature is that the past tense is actually made to agree in gender with the subject, for it is the participle in an originally periphrastic perfect formed with the present of быти (modern: бути) /bɨtɪ~bɯtɪ/, "to be". Verbal inflection today is considerably simpler than in Common Slavic. The ancient aorist, imperfect, and (periphrastic) pluperfect have been lost. The loss of three of the former six tenses has been offset by the reliance, as in other Slavic languages, on verbal aspect. Most verbs come in pairs, one with imperfective or continuous connotation, the other with perfective or completed, usually formed with a (prepositional) prefix, but occasionally using a different root.

The present tense of the verb бути, "to be", today normally has the form, є used for all persons and numbers. Previously (before 1500) and occasionally in liturgical settings, aspects of the full conjugation, can be found. The paradigm shows as well as anything else the Indo-European affinity of Ukrainian:

English	Ukrainian	IPA	Latin	PIE
"I am"	я єсьм*, єм/-м*	/jesʲm/, /jem/, /m/	ego sum	éǵh₂om H₁ésmi
"you are" (sing.)	ти єси, єсь/-сь*	/jesɪ/, /jesʲ/, /sʲ/	tu es	túh₂ H₁ési
"he, she, it is"	він, вона, воно єсть*, є	/jestʲ, je/	is, ea, id est	khī H₁ésti
"we are"	ми (є)смо*	/(je)smо/	nos sumus	wéy H₁smés
"you are" (plur.)	ви (є)сте*	/(je)ste/	vos estis	ju H₁ste
"they are"	вони суть*	/sutʲ/	ii, eae, ea sunt	tō H₁sónti

Note: Ukrainian forms followed by * are considered archaic in Standard Ukrainian (albeit those are still used in dialects) and are replaced by є. In the present tense, the verb бути is often omitted (or replaced by a dash "—" in writing), for example, "Мій брат — вчитель" ("My brother is a teacher"). "—" is not used when the subject is a pronoun, "Я студент" ("I am a student").

==== Classification of verbs ====
There exist two different classifications of verbs: traditional and historical/linguistic.

The traditional classification of verbs subdivides the verbs into two categories based on the form of the 3rd person singular present indicative form of the verb.

1. The е stems, which have the ending -е or -є in the 3rd person singular.
2. The и stems, which have the ending -ить in the 3rd person singular.

The historical/linguistic classification of verbs subdivides the verbs into 5 categories. Classes 1, 2 and 3 correspond to the е stems of the traditional classification, while class 4 corresponds to the и stems. Class 5 consists of the athematic verbs.

1. Class 1: Stems in -е
  - The same stem in the present and the infinitive
    - The same consonantal stem (the last three examples do not quite resemble the first example or the classification name due to various sound changes (palatalization) in Ukrainian):
      - нести / несе
      - пекти / пече
      - умерти / умре
      - почати / почне
    - The same vowel stem
      - плисти / пливе
  - Infinitive in -ати
    - Consonantal stem
      - брати / бере
    - Vowel stems
      - рвати / рве
2. Class 2: "n" verbs (mostly perfective verbs)
  - двигнути / двигне
3. Class 3: Presents in є (undergo changes associated with iotation)
  - Primary verbs
    - Same stem in the Present and Infinitive
      - Same vowel stem
        - знати / знає
      - Same consonantal stem (these stem often have a pleophonic form for the infinitive)
        - молоти (Common Slavic *melti) / меле (мелю)
        - полоти (Common Slavic *polti) / поле (полю)
    - Infinitive in -ати
      - Same vowel stem (-я)
        - сіяти / сіє
      - Same consonantal stem
        - орати / оре (орю)
      - Stems that undergo the changes associated with the doubling of the consonants (the result is slightly regularized in that -ĭje does not mutate into -я as would be expected)
        - бити: б'ю, б'єш ... (Common Slavic: *biti: bĭjǫ, bĭješĭ ...)
        - пити
        - лити: ллю, ллєш ...
  - Derived Verbs (all vowel stems)
    - a-stems
      - думати / думає
    - ě-stems
      - жовтіти / жовтіє
    - uva-stems
      - купувати / купує
4. Class 4: i-stems in the Present (undergo changes associated with iotation)
  - i-stems in both the Present and Infinitive
    - хвалити / хвалить
  - ě-stems
    - вертіти / вертить
    - лежати / лежить
5. Class 5: Athematic Verbs (-m presents)
  - їсти
  - дати
  - -повісти (відповісти, розповісти, оповісти, доповісти, заповісти)
  - бути

==== Voice ====
Ukrainian has 2 voices: (1) active voice and (2) passive voice. The active voice is the only voice with a complete set of conjugations. The active voice, in general, shows a direct effect of the verb on its subject.

==== Indicative active mood ====
The indicative mood is used to describe events, which have occurred, are occurring, or will occur. In Ukrainian, the indicative mood contains the present, future, and past tenses.

===== Present tense =====
Historically, this is derived from the Indo-European present tense. In Common Slavic and later Ukrainian, it retained its present meaning only for imperfective verbs and developed a future meaning for perfective verbs.

For the е stems (Classes 1, 2, and 3), the endings are:

е stem endings
	singular	plural
First person	-у / -ю	-емо / -ємо
Second person	-еш / -єш	-ете / -єте
Third person	-е / -є	-уть / -ють

All verbs whose roots end in a velar undergo the first palatalization in all forms of the present (even though historically speaking the first person singular should not). The endings in є are used for roots whose stem ends in a vowel. All verbs in Class 3 and those that end in a vowel use -ю and -ють. Furthermore, Class 3 verbs undergo iotation in those forms that use -ю-. For reflexive verbs, in the third person singular, the ending has its historical -ть restored before the participle -ся/-сь is affixed. Thus, the ending becomes -еться.

For the и stems (Class 4), the endings are:

и stem endings
	singular	plural
First person	-ю / (-у)	-имо / -їмо
Second person	-иш / -їш	-ите / -їте
Third person	-ить / -їть	-ать / -ять

All Class 4 verbs undergo iotation in the first person singular. Thus, there is really only one ending, which due to orthographic reasons is given 2 different forms. Verbs ending in a vowel take the endings in the second column. In the third person plural, verbs ending in a labial insert an л before the ending, -ять. The ending -ать is used after the sibilants ж, ш, щ, or ч.

====== Examples ======
нести – (stem: нес-) (Class 1 verb)
	singular		plural	
	Ukrainian	English	Ukrainian	English
First person	несу	I am carrying	несемо	We are carrying
Second person	несеш	You (sing.) are carrying	несете	You (pl.) are carrying
Third person	несе	He/She/It is carrying	несуть	They are carrying

вернути – (stem: верн-) (Class 2 verb)
	singular		plural	
	Ukrainian	English	Ukrainian	English
First person	верну	I will return	вернемо	We will return
Second person	вернеш	You (sing.) will return	вернете	You (pl.) will return
Third person	верне	He/She/It will return	вернуть	They will return

читати – (stem: чита-) (Class 3 verb)
	singular		plural	
	Ukrainian	English	Ukrainian	English
First person	читаю	I read	читаємо	We read
Second person	читаєш	You (sing.) read	читаєте	You (pl.) read
Third person	читає	He/She/It reads	читають	They read

говорити – (stem: говор-) (Class 4 verb)
	singular		plural	
	Ukrainian	English	Ukrainian	English
First person	говорю	I talk	говоримо	We talk
Second person	говориш	You (sing.) talk	говорите	You (pl.) talk
Third person	говорить	He/She/It talks	говорять	They talk

====== Athematic verbs ======
Ukrainian inherited from Indo-European through Common Slavic, the following three athematic verbs. These verbs have their own conjugation in the present. Everywhere else they are regular.

дати – to give (perfective)
	singular	plural
First person	дам	дамо
Second person	даси	дасте
Third person	дасть	дадуть

їсти – to eat (imperfective)
	singular	plural
First person	їм	їмо
Second person	їси	їсте
Third person	їсть	їдять

Compounds ending in -повісти
	singular	plural
First person	-повім	-повімо
Second person	-повіси	-повісте
Third person	-повість	-повідять

===== Past active tense =====
The past tense in Ukrainian has the peculiarity of being originally an adjective, since it derives from the original compound perfect (corresponding to, for example, the Latin first conjugation participle ending -atus). Thus, the past tense agrees in number and gender (but not person) with the subject of the verb. The following endings are added to the infinitive with the ending -ти removed (most root final д and т are dropped):

- masculine singular: -в
  - Note: It is lost after с, з, к, г, б, р.
  - Note 2: Stems ending in е or о plus a consonant convert them to і, for example, ніс but несла and міг but могла. Stems in я plus a consonant can also undergo this change.
- feminine singular: -ла
- neuter singular: -ло
- plural: -ли

Class 2 verbs can have forms without the -ну, for example, заслабнути has the forms заслаб, заслабла, заслабло, and заслабли. Not all Class 2 verbs undergo this change.

These forms are often called the active past participle I. The masculine singular evolved from an earlier *-лъ that vocalized.

===== Future active tense =====
In Ukrainian, there are 2 different future tenses for imperfective verbs. The first form, called simple (проста форма), formed by adding to the infinitive of the verb the following endings, which are derived from the Common Slavic verb *jęti (Present stem: jĭm-) which in turn derives from the iotacization of *ęti, 'to take':

Future tense: first form
	singular		plural	
	Ending	Example	Ending	Example
First person	-му	їстиму	-мемо	їстимемо
Second person	-меш	їстимеш	-мете	їстимете
Third person	-ме	їстиме	-муть	їстимуть

The second form, called compound (складена форма), is to take the present tense conjugation of the verb бути and use it with the infinitive of the verb.

Future tense: second form
	singular	plural
First person	буду їсти	будемо їсти
Second person	будеш їсти	будете їсти
Third person	буде їсти	будуть їсти

This will translate as will eat with the appropriate personal pronoun.

The two forms do not differ in function or semantics. However, the compound form tends to be used more often.

==== Imperative active mood ====
The imperative mood is used to give commands. It exists in only the present tense in Ukrainian. There are no forms for the 1st person singular. In Ukrainian, the imperative mood is formed from the present stem of the verb plus the following endings (The example is based on Ukrainian пити):

Imperative mood in Ukrainian
	singular	plural
First person	none	-ьмо / -ймо / -мо / -імо (пиймо)
Second person	-ь / -й / ∅ / -и (пий)	-ьте / -йте / -те / -іть (пийте)
Third person	хай or нехай + 3rd person present singular (хай п'є or нехай п'є)	хай or нехай + 3rd person present plural (хай п'ють or нехай п'ють)

The first set of endings is to be used for stems that end in a dentals (з, д, т, с, н, and л). The second set of ending is used for stems that end in a vowel. The third set of endings is used for stems that end in labials or post-alveolar sibilants (б, в, м, п, ф, ш, щ, ч, ж, and р). The fourth set of endings is used with verbs whose unaffixed form (no prefixes or suffixes) have the stress on the ending in the first person singular of the present tense. As well, most Class 2 verbs and those verb roots ending in a consonant plus л or р take these endings. Thus for example, бери and вибери. Class 5 verbs take the first set of endings, but undergo an archaic form of iotation, so that дь becomes ж (rather than дж), for example, їжте < їд+ьте. This does not apply to дати, which is treated as a regular verb with a stem in да-.

Finally note that all verbs with stems that end in к and г undergo the first palatalization. Class 3 verbs with stems in к, г, and с undergo iotation (as do their present conjugation).

==== Conditional active mood ====
The conditional mood is used to state hypothetical states, wishes, and desires. It has 2 tenses in Ukrainian: a present and a past.

===== Present tense =====
The present conditional is formed in Ukrainian from the participle би or the short form б, which is derived from the archaic aorist conjugation of the verb, бути, and the active past participle I, which is the same as the past indicative participle. Thus, there is agreement between the subject and the participle. An example of this construction would be я би хотів ... (I would like ...).

===== Past tense =====
The past conditional is formed in Ukrainian from the participle би or the short form б followed by the active past participle I form of the verb бути (був, була, було, були) and then the active past participle I of the verb. Both participles must agree with the subject. An example of this construction would be як я би був знав... (had I known...). Alternatively, the past conditional can be formed by using the form якби and the active past participle I form of the verb, for example, якби я знав.

==== Passive voice ====
The passive voice has 2 different functions. It shows either that the subject has had something done to itself or that something indeterminate has occurred to the subject. In Ukrainian, the passive voice is formed as follows:

1. Use of a reflexive verb: митися (to wash oneself or in French se laver)
2. Use of the verb to be and the past passive participle: Він був вбитий (He was killed).
3. An impersonal use of the third person plural past active participle I: Його вбили (He was killed).
4. The following construction: Було + neuter singular of past passive participle, the "-но/-то" form: Місто було захоплене ("The town was captured").

==== Participles and verbal nouns ====
In Ukrainian, traces of all five Common Slavic participles exist.

===== Present active participle =====
This participle is formed by taking the third person plural form, dropping the -ть, and adding -чи(й). Most commonly this participle is used as gerund with the form -чи with a meaning approaching the equivalent English construction with -ing. Occasionally, it is used as an adjective. In this case its form is -чий. Examples of this participle are несучи (third person plural: несуть), знаючи (third person plural: знають) and хвалячи (third person plural: хвалять).

Present active participle
Participle	3rd pl.	Infinitive
бачачи	бачать	бачити
розмовляючи	розмовляють	розмовляти
пишучи	пишуть	писати
оцінюючи	оцінюють	оцінювати
дивлячись	дивляться	дивитися
боячись	бояться	боятися

===== Present passive participle =====
This participle does not exist in modern Ukrainian as a separate form. However, it is commonly encountered as an adjective in -мий (m.), -ма (f.), -ме (n.). Common examples of this participle are:

Present passive participle
Participle (adjective)	English translation
знайомий	known, familiar
рухомий	movable
питомий	specific
відомий	famous
видимий	visible

===== Past active participle I =====
This participle is encountered in forming the past tense in Ukrainian. Occasionally, it is found as an adjective for intransitive verbs. It is formed by taking the infinitive stem and adding the ending -в, -ла, -ло, and -ли to form the past tense participle (in reality the indefinite form of the adjective) and the ending -лий (m.), -ла (f.), -ле (n.). to form the regular adjective. The most common adjectives with this ending include:

Past active participle I
Participle (adjective)	English translation
почорнілий	blackened
застарілий	outdated
зблідлий	grown pale
позеленілий	greenish

===== Past active participle II =====
This participle is most commonly encountered as a gerund, while it is also used occasionally as an adjective. It is formed by taking the third person singular masculine form and adding the ending -ши (-ший (m.), -ша (f.), -ше (n.) if it's used as an adjective). An example of the gerund is знавши, while a common (dialectical) adjective would be the word бувший (third person singular masculine: був).

Present active participle
Participle (gerund)	3rd sg. m.	Infinitive
знавши	знав	знати
робивши	робив	робити
віддавши	віддав	віддати
помивши	помив	помити
писавши	писав	писати
мившись	мився	митися

===== Past passive participle =====
The past passive participle is the only participle used commonly as an adjective. There are two parallel forms with no difference in meaning: in -тий or in -ний. This participle is formed from the infinitive stem for most verbs. Class 2 verbs can as for other participles drop the suffix -ну or only the -у, for example, движений from двигнути. Verbs in -ува́ти or -юва́ти (those whose ending is stressed) will replace the у by о and ю by ь/йо (ь if a consonant precedes or й if a vowel), for example, мальо́ваний from малюва́ти. Finally, Class 3 stems with full voicing have two possible stems: the first is simply obtained by dropping the -ти from the infinitive, while the second is obtained by dropping the last three letters (which in effect means using the present form). The first form will take the -тий ending, while the second form will take the -ний ending, for example полоти has полотий and полений. Note that the verb молоти has the second form мелений, since it derives from *melti in Common Slavonic. The ending is determined as follows:

- If the stem ends in a vowel or ер or ор (derived from a sonant r in Common Slavonic), then
  - If the vowel is и, у, я a sibilant plus а, ер, or ор then add -тий, for example, розп'ятий, тертий, or жатий.
  - For class 3 verbs with full voicing ending in о, then add -тий, for example, поротий.
  - For all Class 4 verbs, the ending is -єний, for example, гоєний.
  - Otherwise, the ending is -ний.
- If the stem ends in a consonant, then add -ений. Class 1 verbs undergo the first palatalization, while Class 2, 4, and 5 verbs undergo iotation, for example, печений, тиснений, ораний, лишений, люблений, and їджений.

Past passive participle
Participle	Infinitive
Most 1st conjugation verbs
співаний	співати
порізаний	порізати
Verbs in -увати/-ювати where the stress in the infinitive comes on the ва
механізований	механізувати
сформульований	сформулювати
Verbs in -увати/-ювати where the stress in the infinitive comes before the -увати/-ювати
очікуваний	очікувати
повторюваний	повторювати
Most short verbs
митий	мити
битий	бити
грітий	гріти

Most 2nd conjugation verbs (especially irregular verbs) are formed from the first person singular:

Most 2nd conjugation verbs
Participle	1st sg.	Infinitive
зроблений	зроблю	зробити
чищений	чищу	чистити
ношений	ношу	носити

Some verbs also have two variants, e.g. одягнутий and одягнений (infinitive: одягнути), замкнутий and замкнений (infinitive: замкнути).

===== Verbal noun =====
The verbal noun is created by taking the past passive participle, dropping ий, doubling the consonant if permitted by the rules under -ĭjV, and adding a я. This will be a neuter noun declined like all neuter nouns in *ĭjе. If the -е- of the past passive participle is stressed then the е will mutate into an і. Examples include питання from питати and носіння from носити. Note that any Class 3 verbs in -увати or -ювати will restore the у or ю малювання from мальований (from малювати).

The verbal noun in Ukrainian is derived from the Common Slavic verbal noun, where it was formed by adding *-ĭjе to the past passive participle without the *ŭ ending. Thus, in Ukrainian, the consonant is doubled if possible.

=== Word formation ===
Ukrainian has a rich set of prefixes, both prepositional and adverbial in nature, as well as diminutive, augmentative, and frequentative suffixes. All of these can be stacked one upon the other, to produce multiple derivatives of a given word. Participles and other inflectional forms may also have a special connotation. For example, the word напіввідкритий (napivvidkrytyi, "half-open" or "partially open") can be split into the following prefixes and suffixes:

на + пів + від + кри (root) + тий.

The form can be analyzed as follows:

Morpheme	Transliteration	Gloss	Meaning
на-	na-	on, onto	Prefix contributing to the formation of напів- ("half-")
пів-	piv-	half	Indicates partial extent
від-	vid-	away, off	Prefix indicating opening or separation
кри-	kry-	cover	Verbal root meaning "cover"
-тий	-tyi	participial/adjectival suffix	Roughly equivalent to English "-ed"

The literal interpretation is approximately "half-uncovered", with the natural English translation "half-open". (In modern Ukrainian, напів- (napiv-, "half-, semi-") is generally treated as a single prefix, although it can be analyzed historically as на- + пів-.)

==== Prefixes ====
In Ukrainian, prefixes can be added to a root and stacked on top of each as in the above example. The most common prefixes are given in the table below. Although the prefixes have the given meaning, when attached to a root, it is possible that the resulting new word will have a unique meaning that is distantly related to the original meaning of the prefix. If possible the example is given using the verbal root ходити or the nominal root хід.

Common Ukrainian Prefixes
Prefix	English translation	Example	English translation	Original word	English translation
пере-	again, re-	переходити	to pass	ходити	to walk, to go
в-/у-, во-	into, in, en-	входити вхід	to enter entrance	ходити хід	to walk, to go walk, move
ви-	out, ex-	вихід виходити	exit to exit, to go out	хід ходити	walk, move to walk, to go
з-, с-, (зі-, зу-, со-, су-, із-, іс-) (1)	together (with), con-	сходи	stairs	ходи (plural of хід)	walks, moves
за-	beyond, trans-	заходити захід Закарпаття	to enter, to come in sunset (in this context) Zakarpattia (region)	ходити хід	to walk, to go walk, move
спів-	co-	співробітник	employee, colleague	робітник	worker
пів-	half, mid-	південь	south	день	day
під-	under-, sub-	підходити	to approach, to fit	ходити	to walk, to go
від-/од-	away from	відходити	to depart, to withdraw, to digress	ходити	to walk, to go
проти-	against, contra-	протилежний	opposite, contrary, reverse	from лежати	to lie (on)
не-	not, un-, non-, in-	неходжений	not walking (negation)	ходжений (from ходити)	walking
об-, обо-	circum-, around	обходити обов'язковий	to bypass, to evade mandatory	ходити from в'язати	to walk, to go to bind, to knit
про-	through	проходити продати	to pass to sell	ходити дати	to walk, to go to give
при-	closer, near, cis-	приходити	to come, to arrive	ходити	to walk, to go
пре-	more than	прекрасний	beautiful, wonderful	красний (archaic)	nice, fine
без-	without	безробітний	workless, unemployed	робітний (archaic)	hardworking, plodding, laborious
до-	to, ad-	доходити додати	to reach to add	ходити дати	to walk, to go to give
на-	on	надати (common usage: надати допомогу)	to provide (to provide help)	дати	to give
роз-	across	роздати розходити	to give away to diverge	дати ходити	to give to walk, to go
перво-, першо-	first-	первонароджений першочерговий	first born urgent	народжений черговий	born regular
пра-	before, pre-, fore-	прадід	great grandfather	дід (дідо, дідусь, дідуньо)	grandfather
над-	on, above, extra-	надзвичайний	extraordinary, extreme, unusual	звичайний	usual
між-	between, inter-	міжнародний	international	народний	national, public

(1) The multitude of forms in Ukrainian for the Common Slavic *sŭ(n) (*съ(н)) and *jǐz- is a result of the fact that their s and z could assimilate (or dissimilate) with the root's initial consonants. As well, since a ь followed, there was the potential for further sound changes. Finally, words entered Ukrainian from different Slavic languages with their own peculiarities or that the origin of the word was lost. The following are examples of all the given possibilities:

- збирати < *събирати
- спекти for *съпечи
- зіпріти for *съпрѣти
- ізнов
- іспит < jьсъпытъ
- зошит for *съшитъ = bound/sown together
- зустріч for *съсрѣчь
- сусід < *сѫсѣдъ < *сън- + *сѣдъ = sit together
- союз for OCS *съѭзь = yoke together

In Ukrainian, the normal form is з (роздивлятись, розмова, бездіяти) except before к, п, т, ф and х where the normal form is с (спати, стояти; exception: без-, e.g. безпека).

The following rules are followed when adding a prefix to the root:

1. If the prefix ends in a consonant and the root starts with an iotated vowel, then an apostrophe is added between the prefix and the root, for example, з'їсти.
2. If a prefix ends in a consonant and the root starts with two or more consonants, then the vowel і is inserted between the prefix and the root, for example, розібрати. This does not apply to the prefix в, for example, вбрати.

==== Suffixes ====
In Ukrainian, suffixes can be added to a root and stacked on top of each to produce a family of words. The most common suffixes are given in the table below. The curly brackets {} denote the various possible different suffixes with a similar meaning.

Common Ukrainian suffixes
Root type + suffix = resulting word type	English translation	Example
Noun + {-ар(ь), -ач, -ць, -ак, -ик, -аль, -ист (from Latin -ist), -ух} = noun	one who does, -er, often male	школяр, ткач, коваль, бандурист, пастух
Noun + {-иця, -иня, -(а)ха, -аля, -ка} = noun	female version of a noun	княгиня
Adjective + {-ець, -ак, -ик, -ко, -ун} = noun	a male with the given attribute of the adjective	грішник
Noun of a city/nation + {-ин(я), -як(а), -ець/-ця} = noun	citizen/inhabitant of the city/nation (male/female)	українець
Noun + {-енко, -ич, -юк, -чук, -івна} = noun	descendant of, son/daughter of	Шевченко (from швець), Ткачук (from ткач)
Noun + -иха	often a negative female noun (female pejoratives)	сторожиха
Noun + -ня	place where noun can be done/found	читальня, книгарня
Adjective + -ота	being in the state described by the noun	біднота
Noun/verb stem + -ство	abstract form of the noun, -dom, -ship, -edness	королівство, товариство, жіноцтво
Adjective + -ість	possessing the qualities expressed by the adjective, -ness	радість, старість
Any word + {-ок/-ка/-ко, -енько, -ць/-ця/-це, -ятко (< Common Slavic *-ętko/*-ятко)} = noun	diminutive, of various shades of positive meaning (masculine/feminine/neuter forms given)	млиночок, телятко, вітерець
Any word + {-ака, -сько, -ище, -ура, -уга, -ука} = noun	augmentative with a negative connotation	хлопчисько, дідище
Masculine noun + -ів = possessive Adjective	Possessive adjective	братів
Feminine noun + -ин = possessive Adjective	Possessive adjective	бабин
Nouns + {-овий/-ський} = adjective	belonging to, containing the noun	дубовий, сільський
Nouns + -ячий (< Common Slavic *-ętjĭ) = adjective	belonging to	курячий, риб'ячий
Nouns + -яний (< Common Slavic *-ęnjĭ/-) = adjective	made of, consisting of	дерев'яний, гречаний
Nouns + -ний = adjective	made of	молочний
Adjective + -ісіньк-/-есеньк- = adjective	'absolutely, most highly, extremely'	чистесенький/чистісінький
Adjective + -нький = adjectival noun	diminutive	чорненький
Adjective in -ський + -щина (drop -ський) = noun	The noun refers to the region	Київщина
(Foreign) word + -увати = verb	creates a verb from any other word	купувати

==== Adjectives ====
Two or more adjectives can be combined into a single word using an о as the linking vowel, for example, сільськогосподарський, which consists of the adjectives сільський and господарський. If the second adjective starts with a vowel, then a dash can be used to separate the linking vowel and the second adjective, for example, середньо-європейський.

==== Verbs ====
In addition to the suffixes and prefixes that can be added to verbs, Ukrainian verbs have inherited occasional traces of the Indo-European ablaut. The primary ablaut is the difference between long and short Indo-European vowels. In Ukrainian, due to the fact that the long and short vowels experienced different reflexes, this ablaut is reflected as a change in vowels. The resulting verbs are often imperfect-perfect pairs. For example, we have скочити and скакати (simplified Indo-European *skoki- and *skōka-).

=== Fundamental sentence structure ===
==== Coordination ====
===== Separative coordinations =====
The separative coordinations are formed with the assistance of separative conjunctions.

Separative coordinations
Ukrainian	Romanization	English translation
або	abo	either
хоч	khoch	though, albeit
чи	chy	or
або ... або	abo ... abo	either ... or
чи ... чи	chy ... chy	whether ... whether
хоч ... хоч	khoch ... khoch	though ... though
то ... то	to ... to	then ... then
не то ... не то	ne to ... ne to	not that ... not that
чи то ... чи то	chy to ... chy to	either ... or that

===== Conjoining coordinations =====
The conjoining coordinations are formed with the assistance of the conjunctions і (й, та) ("and"; usage of the three words depends on the sentence), (a)ні ... (a)ні ("not ... not"), теж ("too"), також ("also"), etc.

===== Oppositional coordinations =====
The oppositional coordinations are formed with the assistance of oppositional conjunctions.

Oppositional coordinations
Ukrainian	Romanization	English translation
а	a	and~but
та	ta	and~but
ж(е)	zh(e)	and~but
але	ale	but
проте	prote	on the other hand
зате	zate	on the other hand
однак	odnak	however

==== Subordination ====
Common Ukrainian subordinations (complementizers) are:

Complementizers
Ukrainian	Romanization	English translation
як	yak	how, if
коли	koly	when
якщо	yakshcho	if
тому що	tomu shcho	because
бо	bo	because
хоча	khocha	although
щоб(и)	shchob(y)	so that

== Syntax ==
The basic word order, both in conversation and the written language, is subject–verb–object (SVO). However, because the relations are marked by inflexion, considerable latitude in word order is allowed, and all the permutations can be used. The word order expresses the logical stress, and the degree of definiteness.

=== Negation ===
Unlike English, Latin, and various other languages, Ukrainian allows multiple negatives, as in ніхто ніколи нікому нічого не прощає 'no-one ever forgives anyone anything', literally 'no-one never to no-one nothing does not forgive'. Single negatives are often grammatically incorrect because when negation is used in complex sentences every part that could be grammatically negated should be negative.

Objects of a negated verb are placed in the genitive case, where they would be accusative if the verb were not negated.

=== Inflectional usage ===
==== Case ====
The use of cases in Ukrainian can be very complicated. In general, the nominative, genitive, accusative, and vocative cases can be used without a preposition. On the other hand, the locative and instrumental cases are used primarily with a preposition. Furthermore, and much like in Latin, different prepositions can be followed by nouns in different cases, resulting in different meanings.

==== Aspect ====
Ukrainian verbs can have one of two aspects: imperfective and perfective. The imperfective form denotes an action that is taking place in the present, is ongoing, is repetitive, or is habitual. The perfective form indicates an action that is completed, is the result of an action, is the beginning of an action, or is shorter or longer than usual. As a result, the perfective verbs have no present tense. For example, спати is imperfective, while поспати is perfective. Instead of the prefix, the infix can also be changed, like in кидати (imperfective) and кинути (perfective). Further examples:

Imperfective and perfective
Imperfective verb	Perfective verb
пити	випити
робити	зробити
розуміти	зрозуміти
малювати	намалювати
читати	прочитати
кидати	кинути

Some common prefixes have a specific function and meaning:

Common prefixes
Prefix	Type of action	Imperfective verb	Perfective verb
по-	action limited by a period, completion	читати	прочитати
при-	joining, bringing together	готувати	приготувати
на-	completion, exhaustive or intensive action, a movement to or onto	писати	написати
ви-	emission	пити	випити
з- (с-)	emission	робити	зробити

== See also ==
- Ukrainian language
- Ukrainian alphabet
- Ukrainian orthography
- Ukrainian name
- Ukrainian surname
- Ukrainian phonology
