= Oreya =

Ukrainian chamber choir

- Choir
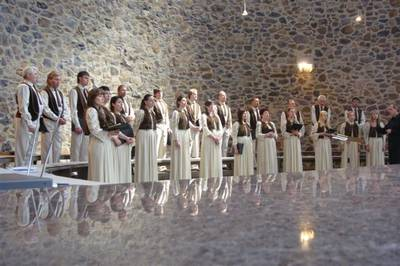
- The choir performing in a service at St. Martin, Idstein, Germany, in 2009
- Origin: Zhytomyr, Ukraine
- Founded: 1986
- Genre: Mixed chamber choir a cappella
- Chief conductor: Alexander Vatsek
- Website: www.oreya.org

Oreya (Ukrainian: Орея) is a mixed chamber choir a cappella, based in Zhytomyr, Ukraine. It was founded by Alexander Vatsek in 1986, and has been conducted by him. The choir, focused on Ukrainian sacred and secular music, has been successful in international concerts and competitions.

== History ==
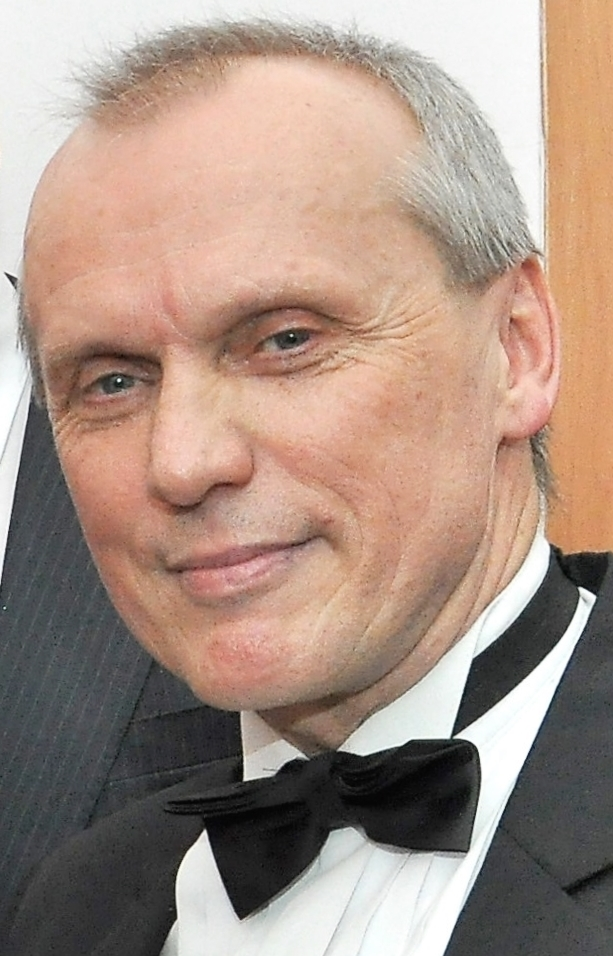
Alexander Vatsek in 2016

The choir was founded in 1986 by Alexander Vatsek, who has conducted the group since. They focus on both Ukrainian music and international works through the centuries such as Alfred Schnittke's Pater Noster, Samuel Barber's Agnus Dei, Eric Whitacre's Lux Aurumque, Rachmaninoff's All-Night Vigil, Pärt Uusberg's Kyrie and Hyo-Won Woo's Gloria.

They have collected prizes at international choral competitions such as the International Robert Schumann Choir Competition and the 14th International Chamber Choir Competition Marktoberdorf in 2015, where they won among other awards a special prize for the best interpretation of a religious choral work for performing Schnittke's: Lord Jesus Christ. They performed concerts such as at the Aachen Biennale in 2009, where they sang solo concerts and also together with six other international choirs in the concluding work, Leonard Bernstein's "Kaddish".

Daniel Honsack, a reviewer of the Wiesbadener Tagblatt, noted about their concert in St. Martin, Idstein: "The choir impresses with gentle persistence and penetrating sharpness. The tonal homogeneity, which is retained even in seemingly chaotic placement of the singers, is astonishing. The individual parts shine in individual sound colors, which can be mixed in different combinations". ("Der Chor beeindruckt mit sanfter Nachhaltigkeit und eindringlicher Schärfe. Verblüffend ist die klangliche Homogenität, die auch bei scheinbar chaotischer Choraufstellung beibehalten wird. Die einzelnen Stimmgruppen glänzen durch eigenständige Klangfarben, die sich immer wieder neu zusammenmischen lassen.")

In June 2016 the choir participated in Israel, along with the Gary Bertini Israel Choir, in gala concerts of the Israel Philharmonic Orchestra conducted by Vasily Petrenko of Rachmaninoff's choral symphony The Bells.
