= Ukrainian Studio of Plastic Arts =

Art institution

- Ukrajins'ka Studija Plastyčnoho Mystectva
- Other name: The Ukrainian Academy (Czech:Ukrainska akademia)
- Type: Art school, higher education
- Active: 1923–1952
- Founder: Ukrainian Circle of Plastic Arts
- Location: Prague, Czechoslavakia

The Ukrainian Studio of Plastic Arts (1923–1932) (Czech: Ukrajins'ka Studija Plastyčnoho Mystectva — USPM) was founded by the émigré Ukrainian Society of Plastic Arts after several name changes and iterations. The school was officially founded on 24 December 1923 and "would soon become the center of the Ukrainian émigré art world between the wars ... play[ing] a formative role in the careers of many Ukrainians" — as well as Russian, Bulgarian, Hungarian, Austrian, Czech, and Slovak art students.

After 1932, the school operated as the Ukrainian Academy (1932–1952), and was one of the most respected art institutions in what was then Czechoslovakia. It provided systematic education in the fields of fine and applied arts and architecture. Graduates received the title Magister Artis. It organized annual student exhibitions from 1925 until 1939.

== History ==
There was a large Ukrainian émigré community in interwar Czechoslovakia. The Bolshevik Revolution drove 600,000 inhabitants of Transcarpathian Ukraine and hundreds of artists, scientists, students, and politicians to exile in Czechoslovakia. The diplomatic mission of the Ukrainian People's Republic (1919–1923) operated here, and in 1920 its president, Mykhailo Hrushevsky, also resided here. At that time, Prague was the intellectual center of Ukrainian emigrants. On the initiative of T.G. Masaryk, an aid fund (Russian Aid Campaign) was established at the Ministry of Foreign Affairs after the war, from which financial support was paid to institutions and individuals. In 1921, the Ukrainian Free University moved from Vienna to Czechoslovakia, where 3,000 students enrolled. The following year, the Ukrainian Economic Academy was established in Poděbrady, and in 1923, the Ukrainian Pedagogical Institute of M. Drahomanov for the education of high school teachers was founded in Prague. Since 1925, Pedagogical Institute was affiliated with the Ukrainian Gymnasium, initially based in Prague and Řevnice, and from 1938 in Modřany (185 students in 1937–1938). The so-called Prague School of Ukrainian Emigrant Poets consisted mainly of graduates of the Faculty of Arts, Charles University.

The establishment of the Ukrainian Studio was preceded by the founding of the Fine Arts Circle in Prague in 1922, which organized its first member exhibition in 1923. On 24 December 1923, the Ukrainian Studio of Plastic Arts began its activities. The school was modeled on the Ukrainian Academy of Arts, but the Prague Academy protested against the name Ukrainska akademiia plastychnoho mystetstva and so the name was changed, although the school continued to be known as Ukrainska akademia. Another reason for the establishment of the school was the lack of capacity at secondary art schools and the Prague Academy to accept more students.

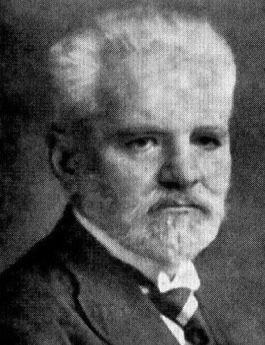
Photo of Dmytro Antonovych, art historian and first director of the Ukrainian Studio of Plastic Arts in 1923.

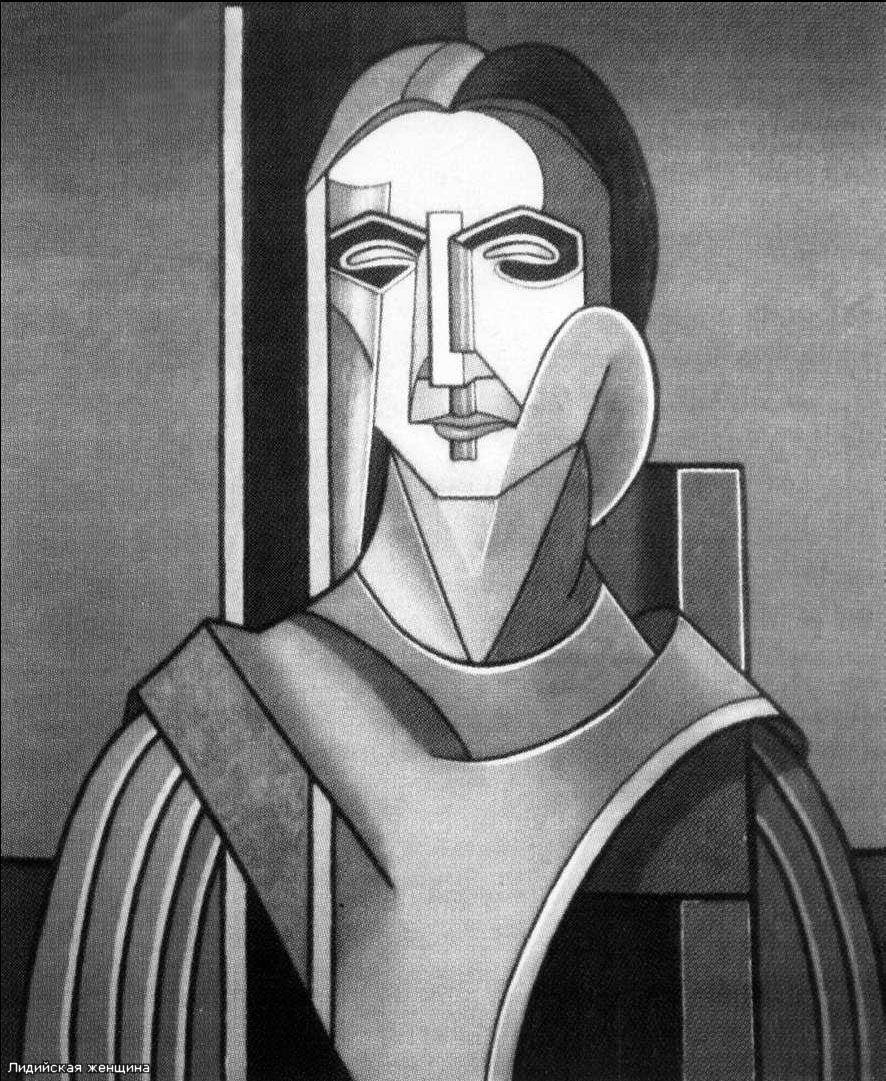
Painting by artist and professor Jan Kulec who saved the Studio from closure by transforming it into the private Ukrainian Academy in 1932.

The initiator and first director of the Ukrainian Studio of Plastic Arts was the art historian and rector of the Ukrainian Free University in Vienna Dmytro Antonovych and professor of painting Sergej Mako, a graduate of the St. Petersburg Academy. At the beginning, ten professors taught 42 students, mostly Ukrainians. The studio was the largest art school outside Ukraine and later served as an academic institution not only for Ukrainians, but also for Czechs, Slovaks, Russians, Belarusians, Germans, French, Armenians, Poles, and Hungarians. The study program lasted four years and included painting, graphic arts, sculpture, applied arts, and architecture. From 1923 to 1927, the Studio was funded by the Ministry of Foreign Affairs, and until 1930 by the Ministry of Education. Until 1932, it received financial support from the Ukrainian Civic Fund, and then until 1952 it was supported solely from voluntary contributions. Initially, it operated in the Metro Palace at 25 Národní Street in Prague 1, and later in part of a building on Konviktská Street in the Old Town. Classes were held continuously, including Saturdays and Sundays as well as summer holidays, and were free of charge for students.

The Ukrainian Studio of Plastic Arts collaborated with the Museum of the Struggle for Liberation of Ukraine and brought together the intellectual elite of the Ukrainian emigration. It held annual exhibitions and organized numerous events for Czechoslovak and Ukrainian holidays. In the 1930s, the Studio was hit by the economic crisis and its support for the Ukrainian Liberation Movement was no longer viewed with understanding by Czech society. Emigrants, who had fled Bolshevism to Czechoslovakia, perceived the Czechoslovak government's official recognition of the Soviet Union in 1934 as a betrayal. Ukrainian educational institutions faced reorganization or significant restrictions, if they were not forced to cease operations altogether.

In 1932, Jan Kulec, a professor of drawing and painting, saved the Studio from closure by transforming it into a private Ukrainian Academy. He introduced symbolic tuition fees, but also subsidized the school's operations from his own funds. The school finally ceased to exist after his death in 1952. During the German occupation, when Czech universities were closed, the Ukrainian Academy was the only university where it was possible to obtain an education in the fine arts. The Ukrainian Academy survived until the Communist coup of 1948. It was then renamed the People's Academy and ceased to exist in 1952. Some publications overlook the Ukrainian origins of artists working in Prague and classify them as Russian émigrés (Ilya Repin).

The Museum of the Struggle for Liberation of Ukraine, founded in 1925, collected, among other things, artistic artifacts from professors and students of Ukrainian studies and, by the time of its liquidation during the 1948 Czechoslovak coup d'état, had amassed several thousand works of art. Most of the collection was transferred to the Slavonic Library in Prague and parts to the Memorial of National Literature, National Gallery, Museum of Decorative Arts and the State Archives.

== Professors ==
- Dmytro Antonovych (1877–1945), graduate of the Kharkiv Academy, rector of the Ukrainian Free University in Vienna until 1921, also director of the Museum of the Struggle for the Liberation of Ukraine in Prague, art historian, director
- Edvard Karel, graphic artist
- Jan Ivan Kulec (1880–1952), graduate of the Krakow Academy, lived in Paris before the war, and in Prague from 1914. He taught drawing and painting.
- Stepan Litov (1895–1966), anatomy teacher
- Robert Lisovskyi (1893, Kamjanske - 1982, Geneva), a graduate of the Ukrainian Academy and the Berlin Academy of Arts, taught graphic arts.
- Sergej Mako (1885, Tomsk - 1953, Nice), graduate of the St. Petersburg Academy and Académie Julian in Paris, founder of an art school in Nice (1910–1922), professor of drawing and painting, deputy director
- Ivan Mirchuk (1891, Stryi - 1961, Munich), aesthetics teacher, rector of the Ukrainian Free University
- Ivan Mozalevskyj (1890, Wroclaw -1975, Simferopol), graduate of the Kiev and St. Petersburg Academies, ran a studio in Vienna for two years. Teacher of graphic arts and applied arts until 1926, when he moved to Paris.
- Grigory Musatov (1889, Buzuluk - 1941, Prague), drawing teacher
- Yuri Rusov (1898, Kharkiv - 1961, Montreal), anatomy teacher
- Volodymyr Sichynskyi (1894, Kamianets-Podilskyi - 1962, Paterson, USA), perspective
- Fedir Slusarenko (1886, Cherkasy – 1958, Prague), classical archaeology, philology
- Kost Stachivskyj (1882, Stetkivci - 1959, Prague), studied in Warsaw, Paris, St. Petersburg, Munich, and Berlin, teacher of sculpture
- Serhiy Tymoshenko (1881, Bazylivka – 1950, Palo Alto, USA), architecture

== Notable alumni ==
Before the arrival of the Soviet army in 1945, most of the artists managed to emigrate to the West. The NKVD arrested Oksana Liaturynska, but she was eventually released without trial and managed to leave for Germany and then the US in 1949.

- Kateryna Antonovych
- František Josef Archalous
- Václav Bartovský
- Věroslav Bergr^{[1]}
- František Blažek
- Eva Hettešová Blažková
- Yeva Biss
- Mykhailo Brynsky
- Luisa Černovická
- Karel Černý
- Vasyl Chmeljuk
- Petro P. Cholodny
- Viktor Cymbal
- Miloš Diviš
- Václav Dlouhý
- Josef and Karel Gabriel
- Karel Gabriel
- Věra Havlíková
- Bedřich Hoffschädter
- Pavlo Hromnytsky
- Ivan Ivanec
- Ludmila Janská
- Jan Jungmann
- Oleh Kandyba (Olžyč)
- Karel Karas
- Vasyl Kasiian
- Vasyl Kolyadynsky
- Jan Krahulík
- Zdeněk Kremlička
- Ivan Krušelnyckyj
- Mykola Kryčevsky
- Mykola Krychevsky
- Nina Levická-Šemanská
- Oksana Liaturynska
- Halyna Mazepa
- Karol Molnár
- Jiří Mrázek
- Josef Noska
- Ladislav Novák
- Karel Oberthor
- Petro Omelčenko
- Oleksandr Orlov
- Jaroslav Paur
- Ivan Palyvoda
- Nikolai Mikhailovich Rodionov
- Dimitrij Šetelík
- Josef Šesták
- Ivan Severa
- Blanka Tauber
- Vladislav Vaculka
- Yuriy Vovk
- Sophia Zarytska-Omelchenk
- Helena Zmatlíková

== Exhibitions ==
At the first exhibition of the Studio in 1924, the professors presented their works. From 1925 onwards, exhibitions were held annually.

The 1925–1926 exhibition was held in conjunction with the International Congress of Art Education and was visited by national delegations and President Tomáš Garrigue Masaryk. By 1939, the school had organized 13 independent exhibitions and participated in Prague exhibitions of graphic art and bibliophilia. Professors and students participated in exhibitions organized by the School of Applied Arts and the Prague Academy. Ukrainian graphic art was presented in Brussels (1927), Berlin (1933), and Rome (1938).

== Literature ==
- Nadia Zavorotna, "The Ukrainian School of Plastic Arts in Prague," in: Scholars in exile: the Ukrainian intellectual world in interwar Czechoslovakia, University of Toronto Press 2020, pp. 90–100, ISBN 978-1-4875-0445-8
- Petr Hlaváček, Mychajlo Fesenko: Nešťastná Ukrajina. Osobnosti Ukrajinské svobodné univerzity v Praze 1921-1945 / Unfortunate Ukraine. Notables of the Ukrainian Free University in Prague 1921–1945, Prague: Charles University, Faculty of Arts, 2015. ISBN 978-80-7308-581-0
- Myroslava M. Mudrak, On the Liminality of Being and Belonging: The Ukrainian Studio of Plastic Arts (1923–1952) — A National Culture on Foreign Territory, Centropa 13, no. 3, 2013, pp 258–268
- Dagmar Petišková (ed.), Dmytro Antonovyč a ukrajinská uměnověda / Dmytro Antonovyč and Ukrainian Art History. Published on the occasion of the 130th anniversary of Antonovych's birth, Prague, 2009
- Oksana Pelenska, Ukrajinské studio výtvarných umění v Praze / Ukrainian Studio of Plastic Arts in Prague, in: Horová A (ed.), Nová encyklopedie českého výtvarného umění - Dodatky / New Encyclopedia of Czech Fine Arts – Supplements, Academia Prague 2006, pp. 800–801, ISBN 80-200-1209-5
- Oksana Pelenska, Ukrainian Portrait in Prague: Ukrainian Artistic Environment in Interwar Czechoslovakia, 221 pp., National Library of the Czech Republic, Slavic Library, Prague, Shevchenko Scientific Society 2005
- Oksana Pelenska, Ukrainian Fine Arts in Interwar Czechoslovakia: on the 80th anniversary of the founding of the Ukrainian Studio of Fine Arts in Prague. Proceedings from the international conference ... 12–14 November 2003, in Prague
- Jakub Hauser, Sans retour: Výtvarníci ruské emigrace v meziválečné Praze / Artists of the Russian Emigration in Interwar Prague, Memorial of National Literature in Prague 2020, ISBN 978-80-87376-66-9
- Oksana Pelenska, "Ukrainska studija plastyčnogo mystectva v Prazi," in: Russkaja, ukrainskaja i belorusskaja emigracia v Čechoslovakii meždu dvumja mirovymy vojnami. International Conference, Collection of Documents. Part 2, Prague 1995, pp. 796–800
- Myroslava M. Mudrak, "The Ukrainian Studio of Plastic Arts and the Art of Jan Kulec," Art Journal 49, no. 1, 1990, pp. 36–43.
