= Antonovych =

Antonovych is a Ukrainian surname. Russian counterpart: Antonovich, Belarusian: Antanovich, Polish: Antonowicz. Notable people with this name include the following

- Dmytro Antonovych (1877–1945), Ukrainian politician
- Kateryna Antonovych (1884–1975), Ukrainian artist, children's book illustrator and professor of art history
- Kateryna Melnyk-Antonovych (1859–1942), Ukrainian historian and archaeologist
- Svitlana Antonovych (born 1991), Ukrainian architect and interior designer
- Volodymyr Antonovych (1834–1908), Ukrainian historian, archivist and archeologist
