= Oleksandr Tsynkalovsky =

Oleksandr Mykolayovych Tsynkalovsky, Ukrainian archaeologist

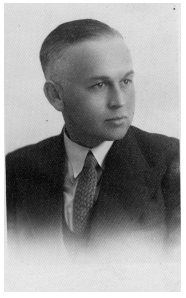
- Oleksandr Tsynkalovsky during his student years
- Born: 9 January 1899; Volodymyr-Volynskyi, Russian Empire
- Died: 19 April 1983 (aged 84); Kraków, Poland
- Citizenship: Russian Empire; Poland
- Known for: Historian, museologist, archaeologist, ethnographer
- Spouse: Regina Tsynkalovska
- Scientific career
- Fields: Archaeology
- Workplaces: University of Warsaw

Oleksandr Mykolayovych Tsynkalovsky (Ukrainian: Цинкаловський Олександр Миколайович, Polish: Aleksander Cynkałowski, Russian: Александр Цинкаловский, 9 January 1898 – 19 April 1983) was a Ukrainian historian, museologist, archaeologist, ethnographer and researcher of Volhynia.

Pseudonyms: O. Volynets, Antin Buzhansky; Cryptonyms: O. V., A. B.

== Biography ==
He was born on 9 January 1898 in Volodymyr-Volynskyi in the Volyn Governorate, Russian Empire. He came from a noble family. His great-grandmother on his father's side was the children's writer Baroness von Wulf, and his grandmother was a sister of mercy and a participant in the Russo-Turkish War, who perished in the Balkans. His maternal grandfather, Pavlo Nitetskyi, a participant in the Polish January Uprising (1863), was deprived of his estate and noble title by the Russian authorities but enjoyed the respect of the residents of Volodymyr-Volynskyi. He collected antiquities, sparking the future scientist's interest in local history.

He received his primary education at the Gymnasium in Kovel, and later the family moved to Zvyahel. During World War I, he was evacuated to Tambov and continued his education at the gymnasium in Kazan.

After the February Revolution in 1917, he returned to Ukraine. The family settled in Zvyahel, from where Alexander was soon called for military service in Zhytomyr. In 1917–1920, he served in the UNR Active Army. He organized Ukrainian schools in Kremenets region. After the defeat of the Liberation Struggle, he returned to Volodymyr-Volynskyi. He worked as a teacher in the village of Osmilovychi. An active member of the Volodymyr section of the All-Ukrainian Society "Prosvita" named after Taras Shevchenko. Engaged in ethnographic and folklore studies.

In 1925–1929, he was a student at the Orthodox Theological Faculty of Warsaw University. He specialized in church history and Christian archaeology. Additionally, he attended lectures at the humanities faculty, familiarizing himself with Warsaw's museums and archives.

He maintained connections with local historians such as Anton and Oleksandr Konovaliuk from the village of Bilostok, Anatoliy Krevs'kyi from Torchin, and Fedir Leno from the village of Vesele in Luchchyna.

With the support of the renowned Polish archaeologist Włodzimierz Antoniewicz, he secured a position at the State Archaeological Museum in Warsaw. Delegated by the museum to Volyn, Polissia, and Podlachia for the study of historical monuments and archaeological finds, he conducted small archaeological excavations. He collaborated with the Museum of the Shevchenko Scientific Society, the National Museum, and the Metropolitan Archives in Lviv. He handed over to them rare Ukrainian artifacts, documents, and old prints that he had found. He had multiple meetings with Metropolitan Andrey Sheptytsky of the Ukrainian Greek Catholic Church. He led the archaeological expedition during the excavations of Zymnenske Hillfort.

Upon obtaining a master's degree, he became a member of scientific organizations, including:

- Polish Archaeological Society
- Shevchenko Scientific Society in Lviv

At the turn of the century the Cultural and Historical Museum, Mykhailo Hrushevsky and the Shevchenko Scientific Society had taken an interest in the history and the archaeology of Ukraine. Leading archaeological experts in this work were Bohdan Janusz, Kateryna Antonovych-Melnyk and Volodymyr Antonovych, Yurii Polianskyi, Yosyp Pelensky, Yaroslav Pasternak, Yukhym Sitsinskyi and Tsynkalovsky. He wrote scientific and popular science publications in "Ukrayinske Yunatstvo," "Nash Svit," "Zhyttya i Znannia," "Zapysky NTSh," and the Polish-language journal "Wiadomości Archeologiczne."

In the years 1936–1939, he headed the Volyn Museum at the Kremenets Lyceum.

During the Second World War, he returned to Warsaw and became the head of the Volyn Department of the State Archaeological Museum.

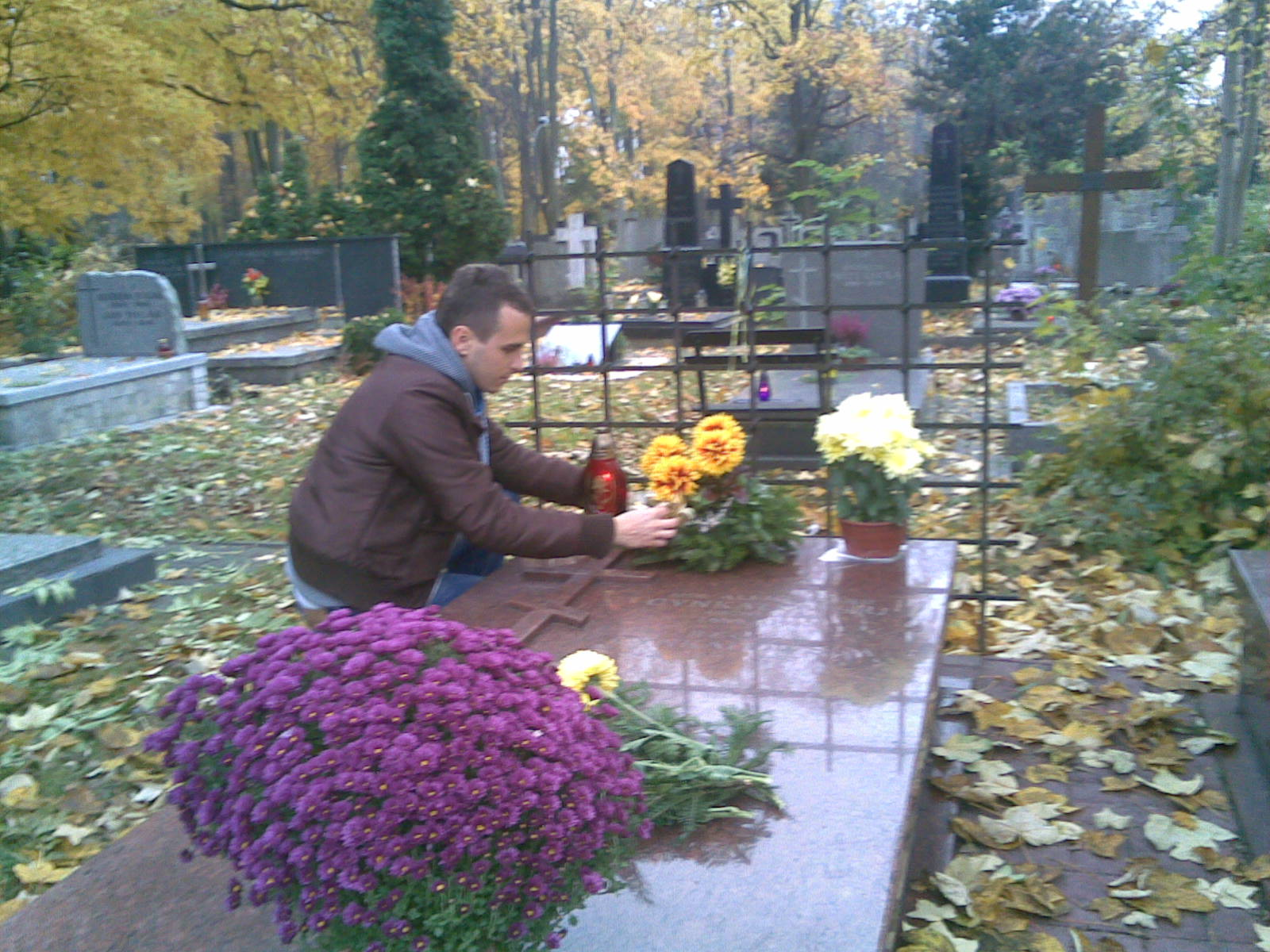
Tombstone on the grave of Alexander and Regina Cynkałowski

Fleeing from burning Warsaw, he sought refuge in the West. Since 1952, he settled in Kraków, working at the House of Books. Engaging in archaeology and journalism, he became a collaborator of the Archaeological Institute of the Polish Academy of Sciences. Unable to visit Volyn, he intensified his research in Podlachia. He identified the historical city of Cherven. He collaborated with the Ukrainian Socio-Cultural Society, publishing in Ukrainian diaspora periodicals such as "Nashe Slovo," "Nasha Kultura," Ukrainian Calendar, Orthodox Calendar, "Litopys Volyni," and more. After Alexander Cynkałowski's death, the Institute of Volyn Studies, over 30 years, published a fundamental two-volume local history dictionary, "Old Volyn and Volyn Polissia," which included entries for 1442 settlements in Volyn and Polissia.

In his final years, he suffered from a severe illness and died in Kraków on 19 April 1983. He is buried at the Orthodox Cemetery "Volya" in Warsaw.

Throughout his life, Alexander Cynkałowski was characterized by exceptional honesty. In his professional activities, he never appropriated any valuables during excavations, and in his relationship with himself and those around him, he maintained a high moral standard. Painfully observing the decline of his native culture and the destruction of historical monuments, he tried to address these issues through his work. In a letter to his sister Olena Grabarchuk, he wrote, "No one cares, no one's heart aches for the fate of everything that will remain, and what will be lost forever. Just like one of our monuments perished, and our people will eat, sleep, and remain silent."

== Works ==
In addition to archaeological research, Oleksander Tsynkalovsky wrote about the earliest events in the history of Ukraine, focusing on the Cherven cities – Chełm, princely cities Drohiczyn, Przemyśl. He did not overlook scholarly themes related to art—he was one of the first to connect the life and work of the prominent Ukrainian icon painter of the early 18th century, Yov Kondzelevych, with Volyn. Before the war, he discovered Kondzelevych's works in Zahoriv, Voschatyn and other villages. In the field of art and architecture, he published works such as "Architecture of Lemkivshchyna and Hrubeshivshchyna" and articles such as "Churches of the pre-Mongol and Mongol period in Volyn and Galicia" (1969), "Enkolpion Crosses" (1972), "Churches of the XV–XVIII centuries in Western Ukraine," and more. He devoted significant attention to hydrology and cartography. Due to his interests in these sciences, he created 12 maps of Polissia and Volyn. Tsynkalovsky also participated in creating a bibliography with an analysis of samples of European literature.

On a professional level, he was interested in hydrology and cartography. Author of 12 maps of Volyn and Polissia.

He compiled a bibliography with an analysis of samples of European literature.

=== Scientific contributions devoted to archaeology of Volhynia ===
- «Materiały do pradziejów Wołynia і Polesia Wołyńskiego» (1961, 1963);
- «Сліди християнства на Волині перед кн. Володимиром 981 р.» (1930);
- «Княжий город Володимир» (1935);
- «Волинські дерев'яні церкви XVII — XVIII ст.» (1935);
- «Матеріали до праісторії Волині і Волинського Полісся» (1961);
- «Ріка Прип'ять та її допливи: Старі водні шляхи між доріччям Чорного моря і Балтиком» (1966), як Антін Бужанський;
- «Старовинні пам'ятки Волині» (1975);
- «Стара Волинь і Волинське Полісся. Краєзнавчий словник — від найдавніших часів до 1914 року» (1984, 1986).
- Цинкаловський О. Княжий город Володимир : попул.-наук. нарис : (з 45 образками й 1 мапою) / Олександер Цинкаловський. — Львів : Накладом фонду "Учітеся, брати мої", 1935. — 111, 1 с. : іл., карт. — (Учітеся, брати мої!; ч. 18 (2)) (Науково-популярна бібліотека товариства ”Просвіта”).
