= Antanavičius =

- Lithuanian surname
- m.: Antanavičius
- f.: (unmarried): Antanavičiūtė
- f.: (married): Antanavičienė
- Related names: Polish:Antonowicz, Russian:Antonovich, Belarusian: Antanovich, Serbian: Antonović, Ukrainian: Antonovych

Antanavičius is a Lithuanian language family name. The surname may refer to:

- Kazimieras Antanavičius (several persons)
  - Kazimieras Antanavičius (officer), partisan in the military of Lithuania, recipient of the Order of the Cross of Vytis
  - Kazimieras Antanavičius (economist) (1937–1998), signatory of the Act of the Re-Establishment of the State of Lithuania in 1990
- Valentinas Antanavičius (1936–2024), Lithuanian painter

== Related surnames ==
- Antonowicz, Polish
- Antonovich, Russian
- Antonović, Serbian
- Antonovych, Ukrainian
