= Antoniewicz =

Antoniewicz coat of arms used by some of Antoniewicz family

Antoniewicz is a Polish surname. It derived from the Antonius (Anton, Antoni) root name. Archaic feminine forms are Antoniewiczowa (by husband), Antoniewiczówna (by father); they still can be used colloquially. Some of them use Antoniewicz or Hełm coat of arms. It may be transliterated as: Antonewycz, Antonevych, Antonevich, Антоне́вич, Антоневич, Антаневіч, Antonievičius, Անտոնևիչ. Notable people with this surname include the following:

- Jan Bołoz Antoniewicz (1858–1922), Polish historian and art theorist
- Jerzy Antoniewicz (1919–1970), Polish historian and archaeologist
- Heiko Antoniewicz (born 1965), German chef
- Karol Antoniewicz (1807–1852), Polish Jesuit
- Michał Antoniewicz (1897–1989), Polish equestrian
- Michaił Antoniewicz (1912–2003), Soviet football player and coach
- Mikołaj Antoniewicz (1840–1919), Galician social activist, historian, educator, member of the Diet of Galicia and Lodomeria
- Mikołaj Bołoz Antoniewicz (1801–1885), Polish poet, playwright, translator and cavalry officer of the Polish Army in the November Uprising
- Włodzimierz Antoniewicz (1893–1973), Polish archaeologist

== Fictional character ==
- Mr. Antoniewicz, The Icarus Hunt villain

== See also ==
- Antoniewicz coat of arms
- Antonowicz
