= Antonowicz =

Jelita coat of arms used by some of Antonowicz family

Antonowicz is a Polish surname derived from the Antonius (Anton, Antoni) root name. Archaic feminine forms are Antonowiczowa (by husband), Antonowiczówna (by father); they still can be used colloquially. Some of them use Hełm coat of arms, Janina, Jelita coat of arms. It may refer to:

- Anja Antonowicz, Polish actress
- Anna Górnicka-Antonowicz, Polish orienteer
- David Antonowicz, Australian rules footballer
- Izabella Antonowicz, Polish canoer
- Lucyna Antonowicz-Bauer, Polish Righteous among the Nations
- Tomasz Antonowicz
- Wincenty Antonowicz, Polish Righteous among the Nations
- Włodzimierz Antonowicz, historian, archivist and archaeologist

== Related surnames ==
- Antonovich, Russian
- Antanavičius, Lithianian
- Antonović, Serbian
- Antonovych, Ukrainian

== See also ==
- Antoniewicz
