= Antonovich =

Antonovich is a Russian language patronymic surname derived from the first name Anton.

Not to be confused with the patronymic part "Antonovich" of full East Slavic names. The confusion may arise, e.g., for the names of nobility, often not using surnames, such as Alexei Antonovich of Brunswick.

The surname may refer to:

- Michael D. Antonovich
- Mike Antonovich (ice hockey)
- Yuri Antonovich

== Related surnames ==
- Antanovich, Belarusian
- Antanavičius, Lithianian
- Antonović, Serbian
- Antonowicz, Polish
- Antonovych (name), Ukrainian

== See also ==
- Mikhail Antonevich
