= Antonović =

Antonović is a Serbian language patronymic surname derived from the first name Anton. Notable people with the surname include:

- Isaija Antonović (1696–1749), Metropolitan of Karlovci
- Emanuil Antonović (1785–1829), Serbian iconographer
- Ilija Antonovic (1843–1915), Serbian merchant and benefactor
- Milan Antonović (1850–1929), Serbian architect
- Kosta Antonović (1883–1933), Yugoslav brigadier general
- Momčilo Antonović (1938–2019), Serbian artist
- Danja Antonović (born 1944), Serbian journalist
- Nela Antonović (born 1953), Serbian artist
- Dragana Antonović (born 1960), Serbian archaeologist
- Lidija Antonović (born 1984), Serbian photographer
- Tamara Antonović (born 1991), Serbian photographer

== Related surnames ==
- Antonowicz, Polish
- Antonovich, Russian
- Antanavičius, Lithuanian
- Antonovych, Ukrainian
