= Kateryna Melnyk-Antonovych =

Ukrainian prehistorian

Kateryna Antonovych-Melnyk
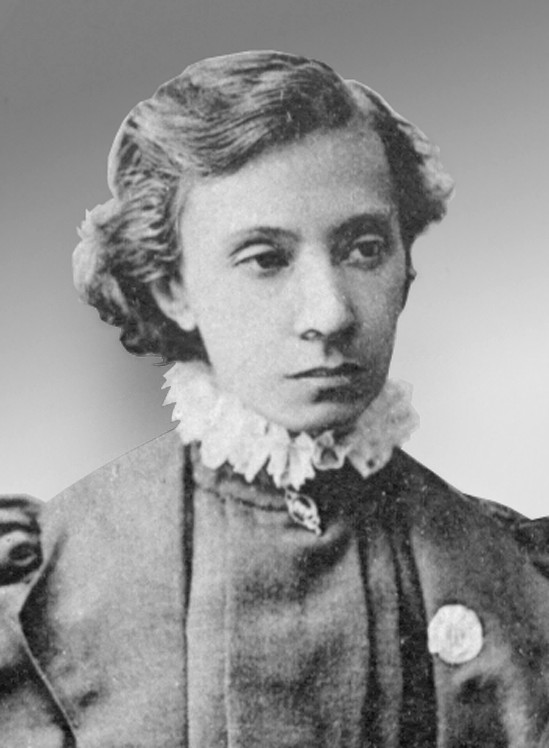
- Born: December 1, 1859; Khorol
- Died: January 12, 1942 (aged 82); Kyiv
- Education: Zakin Poltava Gymnasium
- Known for: Ukrainian history and identity
- Spouse: Volodymyr Antonovych
- Children: Dmytro Antonovych

Kateryna Mykolayivna Antonovych-Melnyk (Ukrainian: Катерина Миколаївна Антонович-Мельник; 2 December 1859 – 12 January 1942) was a Ukrainian historian and archaeologist.

== Life ==
Antonovych-Melnyk was born in Khorol in 1859. Her father was M. Melnyk and her family were doctors. She studied history at Zakin Poltava Gymnasium. Her history teacher was Volodymyr Antonovych, whom she had married in 1861.

In the 1880s she participated in the archaeological excavations near Shumsk (today – Ternopil Oblast) and in 1885, she visited Ternopil during her travels.

From the 1880s onwards she took part in excavations in Podolia, Volhynia, the Zaporizhia region and Sloboda Ukraine and developed into an expert on the Paleo and Neolithic periods, but also studied Scythian and Cimmerian sites. Study trips took her to Galicia, Austria, Hungary and several times to Italy and Sicily.

At the turn of the century the Cultural and Historical Museum, Mykhailo Hrushevsky and the Shevchenko Scientific Society took an interest in the history and the archaeology of Ukraine. Leading archaeological experts in this work were Bohdan Janusz, Kateryna Antonovych-Melnyk and Volodymyr Antonovych, Yurii Polianskyi, Yosyp Pelensky, Yaroslav Pasternak, Yukhym Sitsinsky and Oleksander Tsynkalovsky.

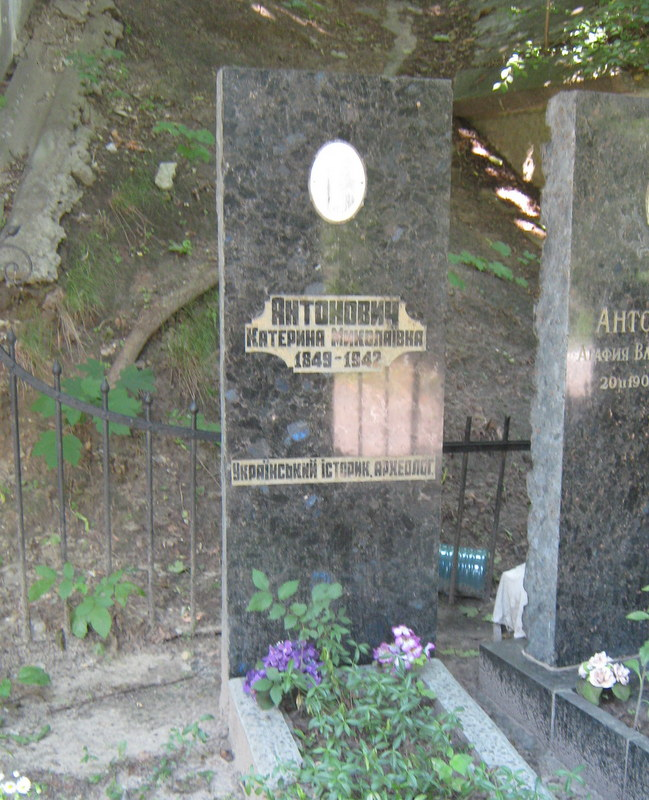
Her grave

She and Volodymyr Antonovych were the parents in 1877 to former Ukrainian minister (and cultural historian in Prague) Dmytro Antonovych. Her husband died in 1908.

From 1919 she worked for the All-Ukrainian Academy of Sciences, where she headed the library department in the 1920s, but she was removed from her position in 1930 because of her politics. Antonovych-Melnyk was a member of the Shevchenko Scientific Society in Lviv and the Ukrainian Scientific Society in Kyev, founded in 1907. She was involved in the creation of the museums at the University of Kiev and in Dnipro. From 1929 she prepared the printing of the first two volumes of the complete works of her husband. Kateryna Antonovych-Melnyk died in Kiev in 1942 and was buried at the Baikove Cemetery.
