= Museum of the Struggle for Liberation of Ukraine =

Coordinates: 50°3′33″N 14°25′44″E

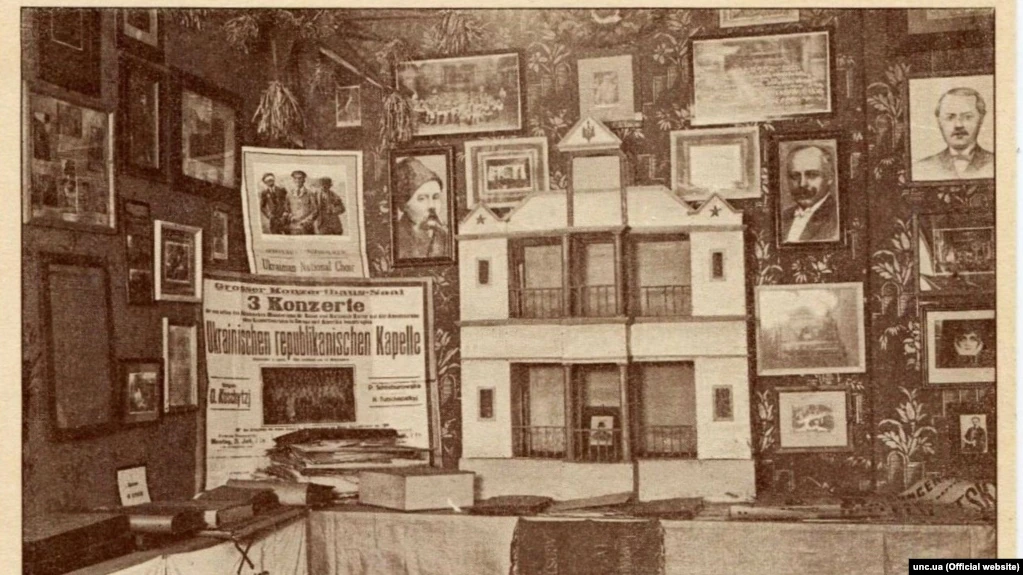
- Museum of the Liberation Struggle of Ukraine in Prague
- Established: 1925
- Dissolved: 1948
- Location: Prague, Czechoslovakia
- Type: Historical museum

The Museum of the Struggle for Liberation of Ukraine was a Ukrainian museum of diplomatic documents from the times of the Ukrainian People's Republic and the Ukrainian State (1917–1921). It existed from May 1925 to 1948 in Prague, Czechoslovakia.

== History ==
=== Establishment ===
The museum was created in May 1925 by the efforts of famous Ukrainian diplomats: Dmytro Antonovych (former head of the UNR mission in Rome), Dmytro Doroshenko (Minister of Foreign Affairs of the Ukrainian State), Stepan Smal-Stotsky (West Ukrainian People's Republic ambassador to Czechoslovakia) and Andrii Yakovliv (Director of the Foreign Affairs Department liaison officer of the Ministry of Foreign Affairs and head of the UNR diplomatic mission in Belgium and the Netherlands).

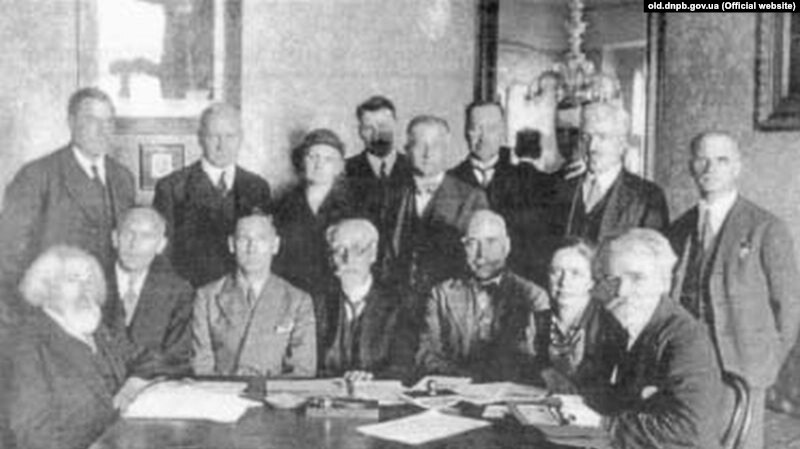
"Meeting of the MVBU Society. Sit from left to right: Siropolko, Virovy, Antonchuk, Ivan Horbachevsky, Yakovlev, Antonovycheva, Antonovych. Stand: Telukhin, Ivanytsky, Syropolcova, Narizhny, Palka, Kabachki, Mirny, Omelyanovich-Pavlenko.

Czechoslovakia was one of the centres of Ukrainian emigration in Western Europe after the defeat of the struggle for liberation of Ukrainian people during 1917–1921. Prague hosted a large number of Ukrainian scientific societies, research institutions, and various nongovernmental organizations: the Ukrainian Historical and Philological Society in Prague, Ukrainian Law Society in Prague, Ukrainian Society of Book Admirers in Prague, Ukrainian Pedagogical Society in Prague and others. As a result, geographical proximity to Ukraine, a great number of the autochthonous Ukrainian population, liberal policy of the authorities concerning Ukrainian emigrants became a major premise for the significant concentration of the Ukrainian political and scientific elite and its active national life in Czechoslovakia. One of the results of this activity was the creation of the Society «Museum of the Ukrainian Liberation Struggle». The reason for the creation of the Society was the idea of establishing a museum with the same name. On January 16, 1925, The Ministry of Foreign Affairs of Czechoslovakia with the support of Tomáš Masaryk approved the statute of the «Museum of the Ukrainian Liberation Struggle» Society, whose task was defined as «the scientific study of everything that touches upon the struggle for liberation by collecting, hiding, and describing all the items and materials related to these goals to enable the realization of the scientific work on their basis». To achieve this goal, the Society had to organize and maintain a museum and archive, where it was planned to collect the reminder signs of the Ukrainian struggle for liberation — books, magazines, pictures, military clothing, weapons, and documentary materials of historical and scientific value. Moreover, it was foreseen to organize exhibitions, promote scientific elaboration and investigation of the reminder signs, organize academic and popular readings, and publish catalogues, magazines, books, and reproductions.

The first general meeting of the Society was held on May 28, 1925. The Board was elected and composed of Academician Ivan Horbachevsky (the chairman of the Society), professor Lototskyy (deputy chairman), and other members: M. Omelyanovych-Pavlenko, A. Kolessa, V. Bidnov, V. Starosolskyy, M. Korduba and others. Therefore, the Board of the Society consisted of prominent figures of science and culture, and this fact greatly enhanced the status of the Society and made a positive impact on the elaboration of the principles of its work.

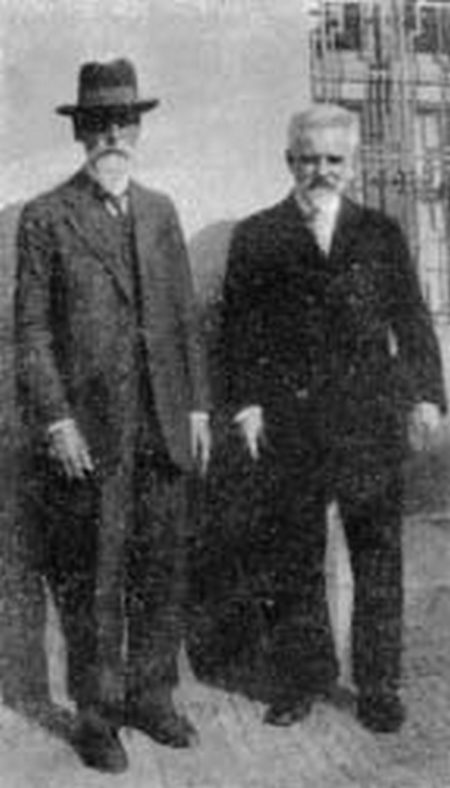
The first chairman of the Society “Museum of Liberation Struggle of Ukraine” academician professor Ivan Horbachevsky and director of the Museum professor Dmytro Antonovych Archive of the Mushinka

From the very first days, the Society launched the active work of the establishment of the museum, where it would be possible to keep all the historical documents related to the history of the struggle for the liberation of the Ukrainian people. The museum was inaugurated in May 1925; Professor Dmytro Antonovych became its director. The creation of the Museum of the Ukrainian Liberation Struggle united everyone who was fighting for the ideals of the state and defended them, as well as those, who were to come afterwards and find the documents of the true story. Each founder could consider himself to be a patriot and a representative of the supreme idea of the state.

The active process of completing its collection started right after the founding of the Museum. As it was stated in the document:

«There was not a single day that Section 4. History 36 the museum did not receive new materials, sometimes more, sometimes less, sometimes they were brought by carts or trolleys…»

=== Independent work ===
In April 1926 the Society faced the problem of closing the museum. Czech authorities insisted that the building allocated to the museum had to be vacated and all the documents had to be passed to the archives of the Ministry of Foreign Affairs of Czechoslovakia. At the meeting of June 17, 1929, the Board of the Society decided:

«Until the Society still has its strength to hold an independent work, it should conduct it on its authority, enjoying the confidence of the citizens, who many times donated all their treasures to the museum for free just to preserve them, very often converting those into a gift to the museum».

As a result of the meeting, the Society assumed responsibility for finding a building for the museum and carrying out its activity without any help from the authorities.

In this situation, an American businessman of Ukrainian descent Lysyuk assisted. He visited Prague on his own business in 1929. He was surprised by the number of documents and understood their importance for the history of Ukraine. When he became acquainted with the nature of the collected materials and, concurrently, with the poor financial condition of the Museum, Lysyuk agreed to finance it. The maintenance of the Museum at the time cost about 350 dollars annually. This regular financial support helped encourage the activity carried out by the society and museum.

The Museum of the Struggle for Liberation of Ukraine Society declared a national holiday of the reunion of Ukrainian lands — January 22 — as a Day of the Museum of the Ukrainian Liberation Struggle at the general meeting on June 27, 1933. Addressing the Ukrainians on the occasion of the creation of this holiday, Professor Ivan Horbachevsky wrote:

«The day of the holiday of the proclamation of two major historical acts — of January 22, 1918, and January 22, 1919 — is the day of the MULS. Let on this day every Ukrainian male and female serve the national Ukrainian cause by donating according to their abilities …By doing this work Ukrainian citizens will do their best to guarantee the existence of the Museum, whose collections not only prove the evidence of the difficult path passed by the Ukrainian people but also call them for the further struggle for independence of Ukraine. Let us all fully execute this duty as a respect to the memory of unforgettable fighters for the freedom and independence of Ukraine».

— Ivan Horbachevsky

Therefore, according to the documents, the main goal of the Society and its members was to preserve the idea of Ukrainian statehood and national unity. All the leaflets with such appeals were sent to various institutions and organizations, uniting in this way a great circle of like-minded people and fighters for independence.

On the occasion of his 80th birthday anniversary On April 21, 1934, the Museum of the Struggle for Liberation of Ukraine library was named after its most outstanding patron Professor Ivan Horbachevsky. In 1935 the Board of the Society solemnly celebrated its tenth anniversary by organizing a jubilee exhibition in the center of Prague — at the Industrial Museum with the Ukrainian yellow-blue flag wavering on its roof. The exhibition presented photographs of Ukrainian Sich Riflemen's life, works of Ukrainians, captured during the First World War, as well as many other showpieces. The Solemn Academy on the occasion of the 10th anniversary of the Museum of the Struggle for Liberation of Ukraine was held at the Great Hall of the Faculty of Philosophy of Charles University in the presence of the representatives of 35 Ukrainian institutions and organizations.

=== New building ===
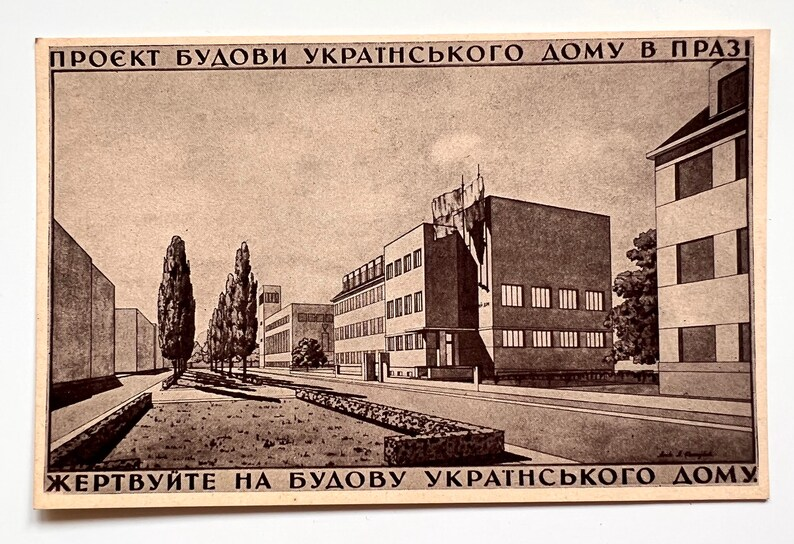
Project of Museum of the Struggle for Liberation of Ukraine building

At the general meeting of the Museum of the Struggle for Liberation of Ukraine Society on June 9, 1927, Vladimir Starosolsky, Professor of State Law at UVU and the Ukrainian Academy of Commerce in Poděbrady, proposed the idea of constructing a separate building for the Museum. This proposal passed to an active phase at the general meeting of the Society on October 7, 1932, when Ukrainian philanthropist Jacob Makogin agreed to cover half of the cost of its construction. Subsequently, it was decided to build a whole complex — a Ukrainian house, with the Museum having to become a part of it. A lot of Ukrainians send their donations to Prague responding to the call of the board of the Society. The greatest contribution was made by the Ukrainian Bureau in London, which was headed by Makogin and Kysilewskyj.

The announcement about the creation of the Ukrainian house and calls for financial donations for the construction of the building were published in almost every Ukrainian emigrant newspaper. These appeals often contained calls for unity and the creation of an independent Ukrainian state.

However, the construction of a new house the Ukrainian House could be delayed for many years, while the storage of the Museum's funds was urgent. In 1937, the society decided not to build, but to buy a finished house for the Museum. The main initiators of buying a house for the museum were Dmytro and Stepan Smal-Stocki. On March 16, 1938, the Board of the Museum Society bought a three-storey building on 6 Horymírova Street in the Nusle district. During 1938– 1939 it was reconstructed for the museum. A new exhibition at the Museum in the new building was inaugurated on June 29, 1939

=== In time of Protectorate ===
In 1939, after the collapse of Czechoslovakia as a result of the Treaty of Munich and the proclamation of the so-called Protectorate of Bohemia and Moravia, the Nazi German authorities abolished all public organizations in the occupied territories, including the Society of the Ministry of Internal Affairs. However, Antonovych, Narizny and others managed to convince the protectorate authorities that the Museum of the Struggle for Liberation of Ukraine Society has never been involved and does not plan to engage in politics. On July 6, 1940, the occupying authorities approved the charter of the MVBU Society and allowed it to resume operations. In 1940 there was a celebration of the 15th anniversary of the Museum. The society decided to celebrate this anniversary not with loud speeches and toasts, but with a series of eight thematic exhibitions on museum materials. Almost every exhibition was arranged in a large exhibition hall and five smaller rooms in the new building of the Ministry of Internal Affairs. The most significant was the exhibition of the 100th anniversary of the publication of "Kobzar" by Taras Shevchenko, arranged from the materials of the Shevchenko department of the Museum in the summer of 1940. Further exhibitions were devoted to the following topics: Ukrainian periodicals, Ukrainian calendars, Ukrainian publications in Asia, Statutes and regulations of Ukrainian institutions and organizations, Attractions of the Ukrainian Academic Community in Prague, Ukrainian klepsiders and other funeral messages, Postal cards of Ukrainian institutions.

The museum was constantly under the supervision of the German Gestapo, with several searches taking place, and in 1943, the director of the Museum, Dmytro Antonovych was arrested. The war completely severed the Museum's ties with the United States, Canada, and Britain, where its main financial base was located. Instead, several scholars from Ukraine came to Prague and allowed the Museum to distribute footage of its permanent staff to museum specialists. Professors Vladimir Miyakovsky and Lev Okinshevich came from Eastern Ukraine. Professor Vladimir Doroshenko also arrived in Prague. They all became long-term scientific collaborators of the Museum and Society.

The biggest problem the Museum struggled with during this period was the lack of finances. According to the newspaper "Ukrainian Reality", the Museum of the Liberation Struggle of Ukraine in early 1943 increased annual membership fees to get more funds. Those who contributed 30 marks became a lifetime member of the Society, and the name of the person who contributed 100 marks was to be found in the lists of members. In the context of the military crisis, this did not fully replenish the box office of the Museum.

The museum also carried out intensive national educational work during the war. Students here often conducted informal "patriotic education lessons", led by Director Dmytro Antonovych and his deputy Naryzniy, as well as members of their families. At the end of 1944, Professor Dmitry Antonovych was hospitalized for long-term treatment. The board of the Society unanimously approved Simon Naryzniy to become a new director. However, he resigned and the Society's board appointed Vladimir Doroshenko, who held the post until leaving Prague in April 1945.

=== Destruction ===
During the Allied liberation of Nazi Germany, the Museum of the Struggle for Liberation of Ukraine building was destroyed when tons of bombs were dropped on Nazi-occupied Prague on 14 February 1945. A lot of museum artefacts and documents were removed from the rubble and were transferred to the Czech National Library in Clementinum and the archive of the Ministry of Internal Affairs.

This was witnessed by Natalia Narizhnyi – daughter of the director of Museum from 1945 to 1948, Simon Narizhny and the poetess of Prague School Irina Narizhny:

"on Wednesday, February 14, 1945, at exactly 12:40 p.m., American bombs rained down on Prague. The raid was carried out in a so-called “carpet” manner – that is, the planes flew over Prague in formation and simultaneously all the pilots pressed the deadly buttons. This raid lasted perhaps five minutes and left more than five thousand corpses on the streets of Prague Among the corpses was the wife of the former head of the UNR government, Professor Isaac Mazepa, who was playing in a nearby park with her two grandchildren. Residential buildings, the main Prague hospital marked with the assigned signs of the Red Cross, and the VBU Museum were hit. I read somewhere that a bomb fell near the Museum. This is a mistake. The bomb fell under the entrance door of the Museum, tearing out the janitor Gromas’ apartment, ours, and both floors to the very roof…No one in Prague paid attention to the sirens, life went on as usual. This time, my mother had some kind of subconscious feeling that was impossible to explain and, grabbing my eight-year-old sister Mariyka in her arms, began to shout and drive everyone into the basement…My father, who had never seen my mother in such a hysterical state, hastily gave me a raincoat to take them downstairs, and he himself began to look for a candle and matches, so he went down the stairs a couple of steps behind me. Apparently, no one else listened to my mother. Gromas, whom I met in the corridor, simply said that “milostpani se zblaznila” (in Ukrainian, this would be “mrs. dobrodeyka is crazy.”). It was completely dark in the vault. Suddenly, a wall slid silently down my back. After my mother's loud prayers, Mariyka's screams, and most importantly, after my father managed to pull his right leg inside, which was crushed by the door, bricks, and all sorts of things, it was necessary to find a way in that darkness to climb out of the vault where it was almost impossible to breathe because of the dust. At the moment when everything seemed lost, a small ray of sunlight somehow pierced the boards and fell on a large crowbar. My father, without wasting time, grabbed the crowbar and began to punch through the wall to the neighboring house with it. Mariyka fell silent, my mother only silently crossed herself. Finally, a hole appeared in the wall and the four Narizhnykhs were able to crawl into the neighboring house... My father was the first to jump out into the street. He returned almost immediately. His black hair had turned very gray. "The museum is destroyed." Maksym Rylsky wrote: “…Someday a salty tear will be born, all the hotter, because it is alone…” I swallowed my tear.”

— Natalia Narizhnyi,

=== Liquidation ===
After the Second World War, the museum was officially closed by the communist authorities of Czechoslovakia. The museum's funds were exported to the USSR, where they were used to fight Ukrainian emigration and opposition to the Soviet government in Ukraine.

As the Soviets advanced, the Ukrainian intelligentsia flocked to the West. There remained those in Prague who naively believed that they "did not harm" by working for the development of Ukrainian culture and that the USSR, having won the war, would become a democratic state under the influence of the Western allies and be tolerant of their political activities. Among those "optimists" was the Narizhnyi. It was to him that the most difficult mission of saving the surviving collections fell. Arrests among the Ukrainian emigration were gaining momentum. But this did not scare Narizhnyi. He remained in Prague to guard the museum funds. After all, it was physically impossible to take many tons of materials abroad or securely hide them in Czechoslovakia.

On April 7, 1945, Simon initiated the general meeting of the Society, at which its chairman Dmytro Doroshenko proposed to change the name of the museum to the "Ukrainian Museum". Everyone felt that the Soviets would not leave an institution with such a name as the "Museum of the Liberation Struggle of Ukraine" alone. Therefore, they resorted to renaming it, as the new name seemed more neutral than the previous one. On June 19, 1945, Smersh soldiers led by Senior Lieutenant Perlin declared all the materials of the Ministry of Internal Affairs in Clementinum and the archive of the Ministry of Internal Affairs to be the inviolable property of the Soviet Union. They were officially sealed. No one informed the management of the museum about the actual confiscation of the surviving museum funds. Since the Czech Communist Authorities ignored complaints about such actions on the part of Narizhnyi, in desperation he wrote two letters to Stalin (August 6 and at the end of September 1945), in which he proved that the museum property was the property of the Ukrainian Museum Society. And, strangely enough, soon, following the instructions from Moscow, the Czech authorities were forced to hand over the property of the Ukrainian Museum to its original owner. The case was won. However the museum's funds were blocked, and the building was destroyed.

Narizhnyi traditionally turned for help to the diaspora in the US, which was the main patron of the museum. However, the diaspora reacted coolly. She suspected him of collaborating with the USSR. First of all, because he addressed Stalin directly. And it also caused an unpleasant misunderstanding. Namely: in October 1945, the archive of the Ukrainian Historical Cabinet, which was a state institution and property of the Ministry of Foreign Affairs of Czechoslovakia, was taken from Prague to the Ukrainian SSR. Then, on the direct order of Beria, a group of prominent archivists of Ukraine came to Prague and obtained from the Czechoslovak government the consent to export the materials of the UIC to the Central State Historical Archive in Kyiv "as a gift of Czechoslovakia to the Ukrainian Academy of Sciences as a sign of sincere friendship of the Czech and Ukrainian peoples." This event was discussed in one of the issues of the Czech illustrated magazine "Svmt Sovetu" for 1945 - a photo was published with the caption: "The Czechoslovak government transfers the Ukrainian historical cabinet to the government of the Ukrainian SSR." This message was reprinted by the main Ukrainian magazines in the West. Some publishers "corrected" the name of the institution from "Ukrainian Historical Cabinet" to "Museum of the Liberation Struggle of Ukraine". Diaspora knew about the name change, but no one understood the situation. This article undermined the authority of Narizhnyi. So the lie became the "truth", although all the surviving archives of the museum as of 1945 were kept intact in Prague. Under the influence of this information, Lysyuk wrote a letter to S. Narizhniy in 1946 with a demand that he send him at least the most valuable archival materials about the national liberation struggle of Ukraine by mail, and sent 200 dollars for postage. However, it was refused, and the money sent back. Then, in 1947, the former patron of the Ministry of Internal Affairs and Communications of Ukraine H. K. Lysyuk founded his own Ukrainian National Museum in Ontario, California, declaring it the heir of the supposedly defunct Ministry of Internal Affairs and Communications in Prague.

In 1946–1947, the Czech and Slovak press was full of anti-Ukrainian speeches in connection with the presence on the territory of the republic of armed units of the Ukrainian Insurgent Army, which tried to legally enter Austria and Germany (to the American zone) through Czechoslovakia. On February 6, 1947, the pro-Soviet Slavic Committee sent a letter to the Czechoslovak Ministry of Internal Affairs, which referred to the "anti-Soviet" and "anti-state" nature of the activities of the Society "Museum of the Liberation Struggle of Ukraine" in Prague in the past and demanded its ban. I wonder if, in that situation, Narizhnyi remembered the proposal of Lysyuk about taking the museum's funds to neutral Switzerland even before the war.

On January 6, 1947, Dr. Volodymyr Galan (1893–1978), president of the United Ukrainian-American Relief Committee (UUARC) in Philadelphia, visited Prague by chance. He was impressed by the large number of objects preserved by the museum and promised financial assistance. UUARC was the most prominent Ukrainian organization in the West. It was founded in 1944 to provide material assistance designated by the American government to Ukrainians at home and in the diaspora. But after some time UUARC declared, apparently under the influence of Lysyuk, that it was ready to provide financial assistance to the museum on the condition that all its funds would become its property. Narizhnyi finally agreed to this proposal. Documents were prepared and officially certified on the transfer of the property of the Ministry of Internal Affairs and Communications in Prague to UUARC in permanent ownership. But it was already too late... The pro-Soviet Czechoslovak government, of course, would not allow the museum's archive to be transferred to the US, which, was evidenced by subsequent events.

Already at the beginning of March 1948, security authorities established secret surveillance of the Ukrainian Museum and its employees. On March 26, the museum was officially closed, keys, seals and "valuables" were taken from Narizhnyi, and the Society "Museum of the Liberation Struggle of Ukraine" was liquidated. On March 30, 1948, its chairman, Zaklinskyi, was handed a resolution of the Zemsky People's Council on closure. In it, among other things, the reason for the liquidation of the museum was given:

"The Society "Museum of the Liberation Struggle of Ukraine", which has been based in Prague since 1925, ... was founded by a right-oriented group of Ukrainian emigration, which relied on various opponents of the Soviet regime, gathered under the guise of scientific work, anti-Soviet political material...".

Zaklinskyi was arrested at night at one of the Prague city transport stops and sent to a psychiatric hospital in Bohnice for seven months. During this time, the process of exporting the museum's funds to the USSR began. No complaints and appeals by Simon Narizhnyi helped to stop the liquidation of the museum. Moreover, the state authorities of Czechoslovakia did not extend his right to stay in the country, so at the end of February 1950, he and his family left the country.

Meanwhile, back in the second half of April 1948, trucks loaded with some of the archival materials of the Ministry of Internal Affairs and Communications came into the yard of Clementinum at night. The employees of the National and University Libraries did not know where these materials were taken. It was considered a "state secret." It is already known that the arrival of the materials of the Ministry of Internal Affairs and Communications from Prague to the USSR took place in 1958, so in July and December 1983, the museum's funds were dispersed among various institutions of the USSR. Some of them settled in Moscow, while some of them ended up in Ukraine, and they were distributed among the archives of Kyiv, Kharkiv, Lviv, Rivne and Ternopil. More than eight tons of materials from Kyiv were transferred to the regional historical archive in Berehove in Transcarpathia. Some materials from the Ministry of Internal Affairs and Communications are stored in the Slavic Library and the Central State Archives in Prague and Svydnik.

== Description ==
The museum carried out purposeful work to accumulate and preserve documents and exhibits from the history of the Ukrainian Revolution. By the beginning of the Second World War, his funds included more than a million items of storage in his museum building. The museum had its archives.

Museum funds were divided into 4 departments.

The documents of the Ministry of Foreign Affairs of the Ukrainian governments and their diplomatic missions made up the first section of the funds.

=== Collection ===
The museum collection included many important historical documents, as well as works of art by Galina Mazepa, Mykhailo Mykhalevych, Georgy Narbut, Oksana Lyaturinska, Robert Lisovsky, Pavel Kovzhun, Svyatoslav Gordinsky, Mykola Butovich, Yuri Vovk and many others.

== Aftermath ==
Today, part of the museum's materials related to the Baltic and Black Sea regional foreign policy of the Ukrainian People's Republic and the Ukrainian State is located in the State Central Archive (Prague). Another part of the materials got to the Russian Federation, Canada and the USA. Up to 100 files from more than 10 funds of the "Prague Ukrainian Archive" (funds "Ministry of Foreign Affairs of the Ukrainian People's Republic of Ukraine" R-6087, "Secretariat of the Ukrainian People's Republic" R-7527, "Diplomatic Mission of the Ukrainian People's Republic of Ukraine in Paris" R-6275, "Delegation of the Ukrainian People's Republic" at the Peace Conference in Paris" Р-7027.
