= Liubomyr Vynar =

Ukrainian-American scholar and historian (1932–2017)

- Born: Любомир-Роман Винар; 2 January 1932; Lwów, Poland (now Lviv, Ukraine)
- Died: 16 April 2017 (aged 85)
- Education: LMU Munich and Ukrainian Free University.
- Occupations: Academic, scholar, writer
- Writing career
- Language: Ukrainian, English

Liubomyr-Roman Ivanovych Vynar (Ukrainian: Любомир-Роман Іванович Винар; 2 January 1932 (Note: His official birth date is listed as 2 January 1932 but it is said that he was actually born on 16 December 1931.) – 16 April 2017) was a Ukrainian-American scholar and historian. Wynar was born in Lwów, Poland (now Lviv, Ukraine) and studied history at LMU Munich and the Ukrainian Free University in Munich. He then studied in the United States where he received a degree in archival studies and library science at the Western Reserve University in Cleveland. From 1969 to 1996, he taught at Kent State University in Kent, Ohio where he also founded and directed the Center for the Study of Ethnic Publications and Cultural Institution and edited the Ethnic Forum Journal of Ethnic Studies (1980-1995).

He was President of the Ukrainian American Association of University Professors from 1981 to 1984 and again from 2004 to 2012 and Vice President of the Ukrainian Academy of Arts and Sciences, chairing its history section. He headed the World Scholarly Council at the Ukrainian World Congress and was a full member of the Shevchenko Scientific Society. In 1965 he founded the Ukrainian Historical Association (UHA), a non-profit organization which he also directed. In 1989, he became a member of the executive committee of the Ukrainian National Council, leading its academic field.

He wrote and edited more than 85 books on Ukrainian history and published more than 2000 articles.

== Awards ==
- Antonovych prize (2009)
