= Hełm coat of arms =

Polish coat of arms

Hełm
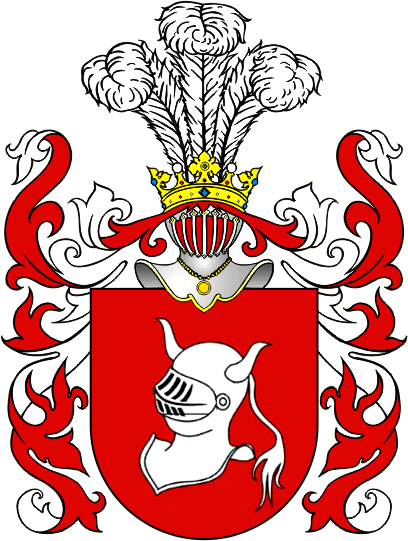
- Alternative name: Chełm
- Earliest mention: 1311
- Families: Antoniewicz, Antonowicz, Błoniewski, Dorniach, Helm, Hełm, Segnicz

Hełm (Polish for "Helmet") is a Polish coat of arms. It was used by a number of szlachta (noble) families under the Polish–Lithuanian Commonwealth.

== Notable bearers ==
Notable bearers of this coat of arms have included:

== See also ==
- Polish heraldry
- Heraldry
- Coat of arms
- List of Polish nobility coats of arms
- Hełm coat of arms

== Sources ==
- Dynastic Genealogy
- Ornatowski.com
