= Svitlana Antonovych =

Ukrainian architect and interior designer

- Born: August 3, 1991 (age 35); Kyiv, Ukraine
- Occupations: Architect, interior designer
- Known for: Founder of Antonovych Design, Antonovych Home, Poliform Astana, Versace Home Dubai, and Solomia Home
- Spouse: Dmytro Korotchuk
- Children: 2
- Website: SvitlanaAntonovych.com

Svitlana Antonovych (born 3 August 1991) is a Ukrainian architect and interior designer. She is the co-founder and chief designer of several design studios and showrooms across the United Arab Emirates, Kazakhstan and Ukraine.

== Early life and education ==
Antonovych was born on 3 August 1991 in Kyiv, Ukraine. In 2009, she graduated from Kyiv College of Construction, Architecture and Design with a degree in architecture. She also earned a degree from the Faculty of Architecture, Construction, and Design at Kyiv National Aviation University in 2013.

== Career ==
Antonovych focuses on architectural and interior design in the premium private construction sector. In the 2010s, she began her professional career as an architect at a design studio in Kyiv. She launched her first project in 2013 with her husband, Dmytro Korotchuk, a textile showroom in Kyiv, named Antonovych Home.

In 2015 Antonovych moved to Kazakhstan and co-founded design studio Antonovych Design. A few years later, in 2017, she established Antonovych Home – Center of Italian Furniture in Astana, Kazakhstan, which provided design and construction services for clients across Central Asia. In 2022, she co-founded the flagship store Poliform Astana in Talan Gallery, the first official monobrand showroom of the Italian furniture company in the Kazakhstan.

In 2024, Antonovych co-founded the flagship Versace Home Dubai showroom in Dubai Mall, with exclusive representation rights for the brand in Dubai and in partnership with Luxury Living Group and Solomia Home. The same year, she founded Solomia Home, a studio in Dubai specializing in integrated design, architecture, and construction.

In 2025, she co-founded a new showroom in Astana integrating the monobrand brands Modulnova, Baxter, and Flexform. Antonovych's projects span Kazakhstan, the United Arab Emirates, Central Europe, the United States, and Africa.

== Public activity ==
Antonovych is involved in educational and charitable activities related to design. She conducts masterclasses on interior design and charity seminars. She has provided support to the Pugachev Psycho-neurological Infant Home in Zhytomyr Oblast, Ukraine, and organized initiatives for children in Kazakhstan, including workshops for children in difficult life situations.

== Awards and recognition ==
Projects led by Antonovych and her companies have received recognition at the Asia Pacific Property Awards in 2019, 2020 and 2021 (International Property Award 2020–2021) as well as other international design competitions. In 2022, Antonovych and her studio, Antonovych Design, were honored at the European Property Awards 2022–2023. The studio received “5 Stars” distinctions in two categories: Best Residential Interior Show Home (Hungary) for the Diamonds and Ice project, and Best Residential Interior Apartment (Czech Republic) for the Castle of Tenderness project. They also won three “5-Star Winner” awards at the Asia Pacific Property Awards 2025–2026 ceremony in Bangkok, recognising the studio's work on multiple projects (including Modern Muse and Dio Grand Cafe) and signalling international recognition of its design practice.

== Personal life ==
Since 2010, Antonovych has been married to Dmytro Korotchuk, founder of Antonovych Group. They have two children.
