= Yaroslav Pasternak =

Ukrainian archaeologist (1892–1969)

- Ярослав Іванович Пастернак
- Born: 2 January 1892; Khyriv, Galicia, Austria-Hungary (now Ukraine)
- Died: 22 November 1969 (aged 77); Toronto, Canada
- Education: University of Lviv; Charles University
- Occupation: Archaeologist

Yaroslav Pasternak (Ukrainian: Ярослав Іванович Пастернак; 2 January 1892 – 22 November 1969) was a Ukrainian archaeologist. He was Doctor of Philosophy, Professor.

== Biography ==
Yaroslav Pasternak was born on 2 January 1892 in Khyriv, Galicia, Austria-Hungary (now in Ukraine).

He graduated from the Faculty of Philosophy at University of Lviv.

In 1914, after the outbreak of World War I, Pasternak was mobilized into the Austro-Hungarian army. Later he fought in the Ukrainian Galician Army. In 1920, he was imprisoned in an internment camp in Liberec, Czechoslovakia (now the Czech Republic).

In 1922–1925, he studied archaeological studies at Charles University under Lubor Niederle. From 1923 to 1928, he worked as an assistant at the State Archaeological Institute in Prague and as a lecturer at the Department of Archaeology at the Ukrainian Free University. He conducted archaeological excavations on the territory of old Prague, including the royal castle.

In 1926, he received a doctorate in philosophy. In 1929 he became a full member of the Shevchenko Scientific Society; in 1926, he became a member of the Czech and in 1944, of the Austrian Archaeological Societies, and in 1965, a member of the Ukrainian Historical Society.

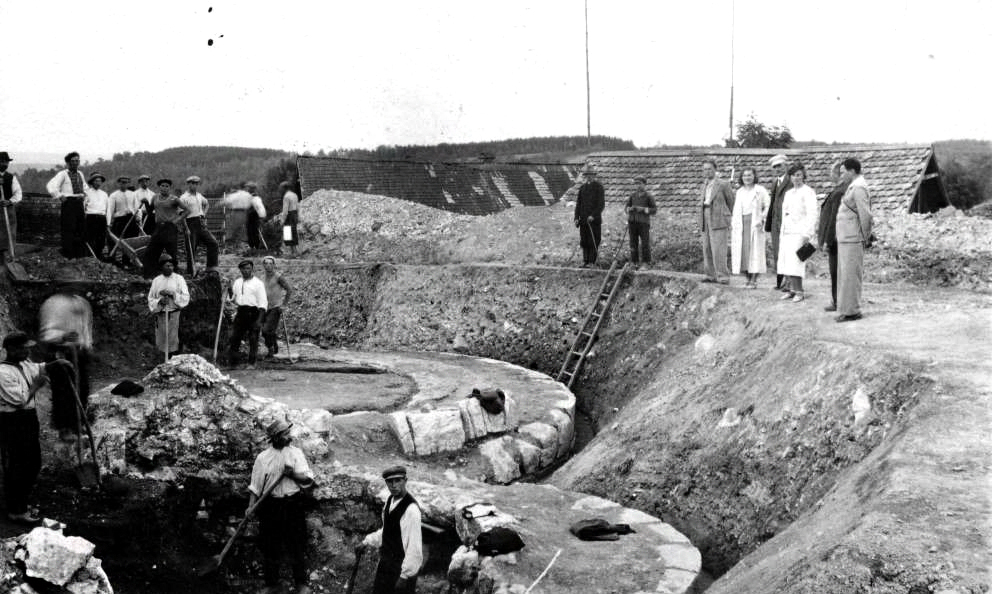
A 1936 photo of the excavations in Halych led by Pasternak

In 1928, he returned to Lviv. Pasternak conducted archaeological research on the chronicle towns of Belz, Zvenyhorod, Przemyśl, and Plisnesk, and the most important research was conducted in 1934–1941 in old Halych, where he discovered the Assumption Cathedral with the sarcophagus of Prince Yaroslav Osmomysl, the founder of the Kingdom of Galicia–Volhynia.

In 1933, in Warsaw, and 1939, in Berlin, he participated in archaeological congresses. During 1928–1939, he headed the Cultural and Historical Museum, and from 1947, he was deputy chairman of the Archaeological Section of the Shevchenko Scientific Society.

In 1932, he began working at the Lviv Theological Academy, where he was an extraordinary professor in 1936–1939 and 1942–1944, and in 1935 he worked as an associate professor at the Ukrainian Free University. In 1939-1941, he was the head of the Department of Archeology at Lviv University. In 1940–1941, he worked as a senior researcher at the Lviv Department of the Institute of Archeology of the Ukrainian SSR.

In 1944, he emigrated to Germany, where in 1945, he worked as a researcher at the University of Göttingen. In 1946, he became a regular professor of archeology at the Ukrainian Free University in Munich. In 1947–1948, he was an honorary guest professor at the University of Bonn.

In 1949, he moved to Canada, where he was an active member of the local branches of the Shevchenko Scientific Society. In 1963 Pasternak was elected a professor at the Ukrainian Catholic University in Rome.

He is the author of scientific works and historiographical essays.

== Death and legacy ==
Pasternak died on 22 November 1969 in Toronto.

One of the streets of Lviv is named in honor of Yaroslav Pasternak.
