= Heiko Antoniewicz =

German chef

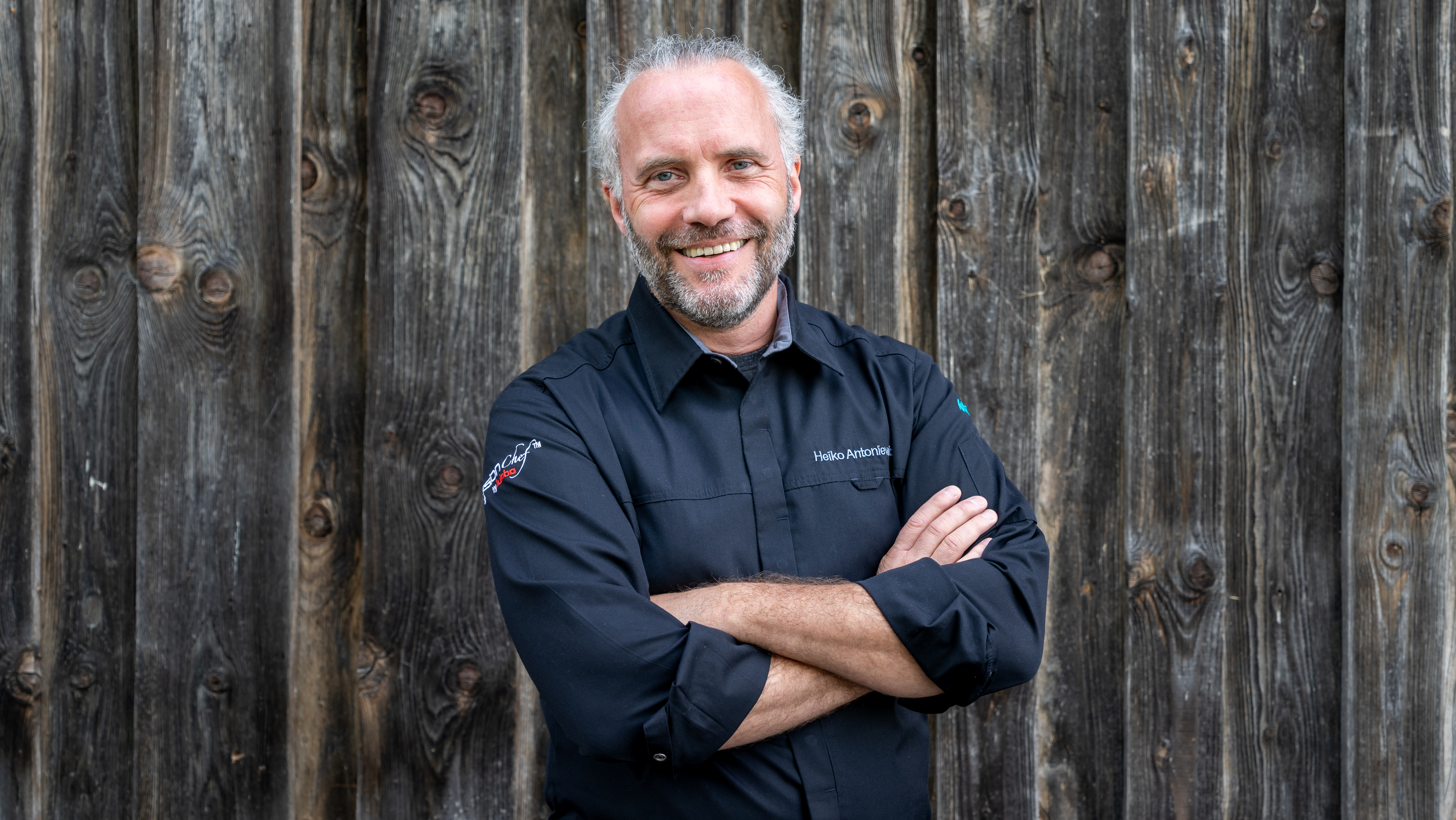
- Antoniewicz in 2019
- Born: 10 November 1965 (age 59)
- Culinary career
- Cooking style: Molecular gastronomy
- Website: http://www.antoniewicz-do.de

Heiko Antoniewicz (born 10 November 1965 in Dortmund, West Germany) is a German chef who uses techniques of molecular gastronomy, including sous-vide.

Antoniewicz has cooked for Crown Prince Harald of Norway, Queen Elizabeth II, and Angela Merkel.

== Published works ==
- Molecular Basics: Fundamental Principles And Recipes Matthaes (2008) ISBN 3-87515-034-1
