= Antanovich =

Antanovich is a Belarusian surname. Russian counterpart: Antonovich. Notable people with the surname include:

- Ivan Antanovich, Belarusian sociologist, linguist, political scientist, philosopher, diplomat, and politician
- Yury Antanovich, Belarusian professional football coach and a former player

== See also ==
- Mikhail Antonevich
