= Antonowicz family =

Polish Resistance members

Wincenty Antonowicz (May 1, 1891 – 1984), along with his wife Jadwiga (April 13, 1896 – 1942) and daughter Lucyna Antonowicz-Bauer (born August 1, 1927) were the Polish family from Wilno (now Vilnius, Lithuania) who sheltered the 20-year-old Jewish woman Bronisława Malberg (b. 1917) in their house after the liquidation of the Wilno Ghetto during the Nazi German occupation of Poland in World War II, as well as two other Jewish families including Henia and Adi Kulgan. For their heroism, Wincenty and his wife Jadwiga were posthumously bestowed the titles of Righteous Among the Nations by Yad Vashem on September 23, 1997. Their daughter – Lucyna – was decorated on June 14, 1998.

== See also ==
- Jewish ghettos in German-occupied Poland
- The Holocaust in Poland
