= Ivan Horbachevsky =

Ukrainian Austrian chemist and politician (1854–1942)

- Іван Горбачевський
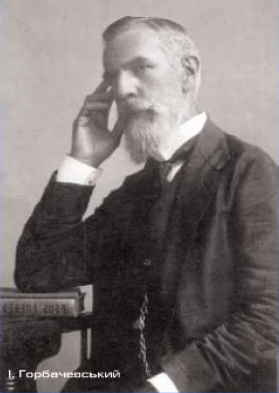
- Born: 15 May 1854; Zarubyntsi, Galicia-Lodomeria, Austrian Empire (now Ukraine)
- Died: 24 May 1942 (aged 88); Prague, Protectorate Bohemia and Moravia (now Czech Republic)
- Education: University of Vienna
- Scientific career
- Fields: Biochemistry
- Workplaces: Charles University of Prague; Ukrainian Free University

Ivan Yakovych Horbachevsky (Ukrainian: Іва́н Я́кович Горбаче́вський; 15 May 1854 – 24 May 1942), also known as Jan Horbaczewski, Johann Horbaczewski or Ivan Horbaczewski, was a Ukrainian chemist and politician of Austrian citizenship.

== Biography ==
Ivan Horbachevsky was born on 15 May 1854 in the village of Zarubyntsi, now Ternopil Oblast, Ukraine (then the Kingdom of Galicia and Lodomeria, Austrian Empire) in the family of a Ukrainian Greek Catholic Church priest, parson of Zbarazh, Fr Yakov Horbachevsky (1817 – July 14, 1875, Zbarazh) of the Korczak family.

He graduated from the First Ternopil Classical Gymnasium, where he became one of the first members of the "Hromada" circle, founded by a 6th grade student Ivan Pului in January 1863.

From 1872 to 1878 he studied medicine at the University of Vienna, Austria. In 1883, he was appointed extraordinary professor and, in 1884, ordinary professor at the University of Prague by the Emperor, and was the rector of the same university for a time. He is particularly known for his contributions in organic chemistry and biochemistry. He was the first to synthesise uric acid from glycine in 1882. He also noticed that amino acids were building blocks of proteins. Horbachevsky worked in Austria, Czechoslovakia, Hungary and Ukraine. It was as though the Dual Monarchy was responding to the Spanish flu when, on 30 July 1918, Imperial Councillor Ivan Horbachevsky was appointed by imperial decree the empire’s first health minister.
