= Yukhym Sitsinskyi =

Ukrainian historian

- Юхим Сіцінський
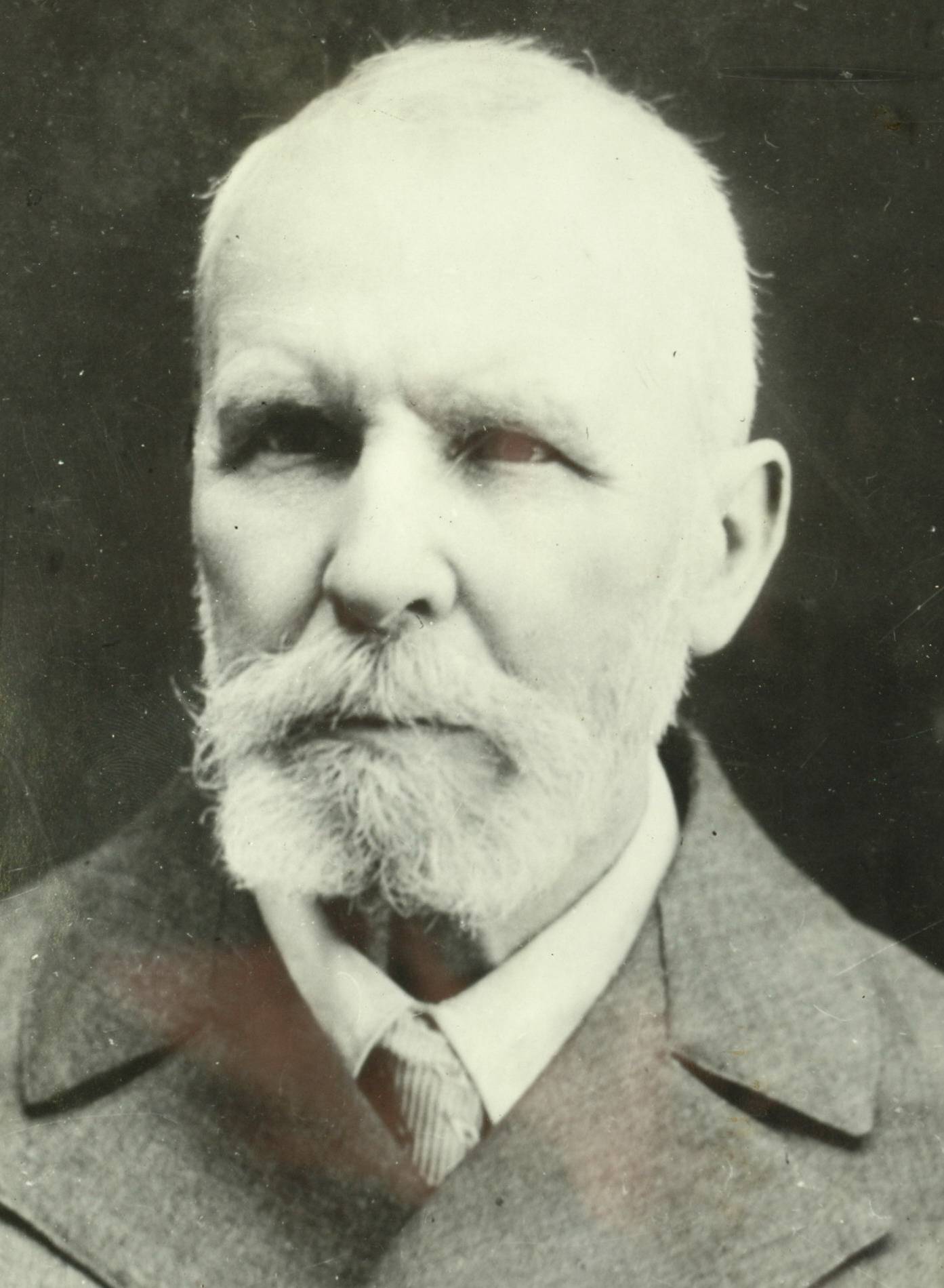

Personal details
- Born: Yukhym Sitsinskyi; 27 October 1859
- Died: 7 December 1937 (aged 78)
- Children: Volodymyr Sichynskyi
- Occupation: Archaeologist, historian, regional history, ethnography, archaeology, social activism and Orthodoxy
- labor: "Bakota - the ancient capital of Ponizia."
- labor: "The city of Kamenets Podolsky. Historical description" (1895)

Yukhym Sitsinskyi was a Ukrainian historian, archaeologist and cultural activist Podolia, Orthodox priest.

== Historian ==
He was the fourth child in the large priestly family of Joseph and Ksenia Sitsinski. In total, the parents had 8 children - Stephanida, Volodymyr (became a priest), Elizaveta (died young), Yukhym, Oleksandra, Yulia, Glafira, Elizaveta.

== Works ==
The scientist's creative output includes more than 300 scientific papers and 150 review articles on more than 1,150 historical, regional and ethnographic articles from various publications. Numerous works of Sitsinsky relate to: history, archeology, religion, art, architecture, ethnography, folklore of Podillia. The most important of them are:

- "Bakota - the ancient capital of Ponizia" (1889).
- "Historical information about parishes and churches of the Podolsk diocese" (1895–1911).
- "Materials for the history of the monasteries of the Podolsk diocese" (1891).
- "The city of Kamenets Podolskyi. Historical description" (1895).
- Archaeological map of the Podolsk province (1901).
- "A disappearing type of wooden churches of Podolia" (1904).
- "Painting of churches in the South Russian style" (1907).
- Historical places of Podolia and their attractions. Kamenets-Podolsk, (1911).
- "Sketches from the History of Podillia" (1920).
- "Essays on the history of Podillia", parts 1-2 (1927).
- Defensive castles of the Western Podillia of the XIV-XVII centuries. (1928).
