= Kateryna Antonovych =

Ukrainian artist and illustrator

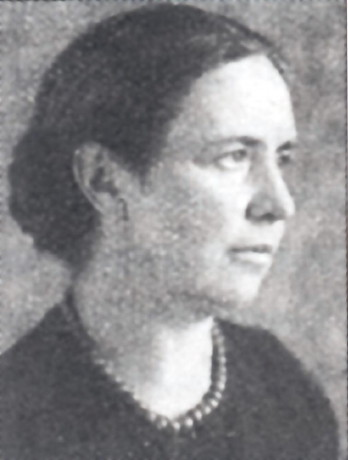
- Born: Kateryna Serebryakova; 23 October 1884; Kharkiv, Russian Empire
- Died: 22 February 1975 (aged 90); Winnipeg, Canada
- Education: Kharkiv State School of Art (part), Medical Institute for Women
- Occupation: artist

Kateryna Mykhaylivna Antonovych (née Serebryakova Ukrainian: Катерина Михайлівна Антонович (Серебрякова); 23 October 1884 – 22 February 1975) was a Ukrainian artist, children's book illustrator and professor of art history. She was active in Ukrainian women's and community organizations.

== Life ==
Kateryna Serebryakova was born in 1884 in Kharkiv. She studied at Kharkiv State School of Art but did not graduate. Later she entered the natural science course at First Pavlov State Medical University of St. Petersburg (then the Medical Institute for Women) and studied for four years. Interested in Ukrainian politics from an early age, she became a member of the Ukrainian Revolutionary Party (RUP). After her marriage to Dmitro Antonovych, she moved to Kyiv where she attended classes of the painters Vasyl Krychevsky and Mykhailo Boychuk at the National Academy of Visual Arts and Architecture. Later she taught drawing at the Rzhyshchev Pedagogical Institute and illustrated several children's books.

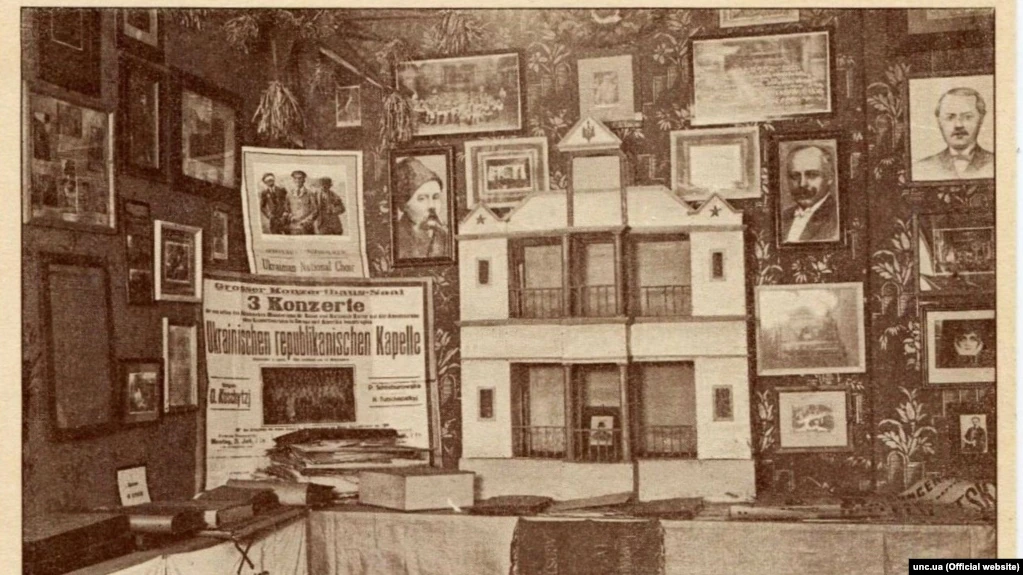
Postcard of the Museum of the Liberation Struggle of Ukraine in Prague taken before Antonovych worked there

In 1923, with her husband and children, Marko, Mykhailo and Maryna Rudnytska, Antonovych emigrated to Prague, where she continued her artistic training at the Ukrainian Studio of Plastic Arts (known as the Ukrainian Academy). In 1927 she started work at the Museum of Ukraine's Struggle for Independence in Prague. She worked there until 1944 and in the following February the museum was bombed by the United States Army Air Forces who thought they were bombing the German city of Dresden. She helped to edit the children's magazine Nashym ditiam (For Our Children) and chaired the Committee on the Ukrainian Children's Orphanage in Podëbrady from 1929 to 1939. Antonovych exhibited her art works in Prague, Berlin and Rome.

Antonovych emigrated to Canada to join her daughter between 1945 and 1949. In 1954 she opened her own drawing and painting school in Winnipeg, Manitoba and worked there until her death in 1975.

== Work ==
Antonovych worked in various media, producing oil landscapes, pastels, watercolours, and drawings. She illustrated children books, school textbooks and magazines. As an active member of several Ukrainian academic, community and women's organizations, she contributed regularly to the Ukrainian press.

In 1917, with her husband Dmitro, Antonovych edited the children's magazine Voloshky (Cornflowers).

Antonovych painted a series of portraits of cultural figures including Bernard Berenson, Mykhailo Hrushevskyi, Mykola Sadovskyi, and Taras Shevchenko.

In 1954 Antonovych created an album of Ukrainian folk costumes titled Ukrayinskyj narodnij odyah (Ukrainian Folk Costume) published by the Ukrainian Women's Organisation of Canada. The album describes the folk costumes worn by Ukrainian women in Ukraine and abroad. Antonovych illustrated each part of the costume, included samples of clothing from the Cossack era, and offered a brief historical summary of Ukrainian culture.

Antonovych arranged illustrations for the magazine Veselka (Rainbow) and edited translations of various fairy tales. The September 1955 issue of Veselka includes her illustrations for the poem "Two Suns". In the article, Antonovych is referred to as a grandmother and is thanked for her work:

Mrs. Antonovych loves Ukrainian children, and we, the children, thank our dear Grandmother for her illustrations and fairy tales. It was very interesting for us to learn about our childhood's magazine Voloshky. We wish Mrs. Kateryna Antonovych many more years of life in health and joy!

Antonovych's portraits and landscapes were exhibited in Canada and in the United States.

== See also ==
=== Archives ===
There is a Kateryna Antonovych fonds at Library and Archives Canada. The archival reference number is R4695.
