= Ukrainian Free University =

Private graduate university in Munich, Germany

- Український вільний університет (Ukrainian); Ukrainische Freie Universität (German)
- Type: Private
- Established: 1921
- Rector: Maria Pryshlak
- Academic staff: 65 Assistant, Associate, Full, Visiting and Honorary
- Students: graduate students primarily from Ukraine, registered in MA and doctoral programs
- Location: Munich, Germany; 48°09′49″N 11°30′34″E
- Campus: Urban
- Colors: blue and yellow
- Website: www.ufu-muenchen.de

The Ukrainian Free University (Note: Ukrainian: Український Вільний Університет, romanized: Ukrainskyi Vilnyi Universytet; German: Ukrainische Freie Universität; Latin: Universitas Libera Ukrainensis) is a private graduate university located in Munich, Germany.

== History ==
The Ukrainian Free University (UFU) was established in Vienna on 17 January 1921. The idea to organize a Ukrainian university-in-exile came from Ukrainian academics, some of whom had held chairs at universities in the Russian and Austro-Hungarian Empires. The UFU was transferred to Prague, Czechoslovakia, in the fall of 1921. The host government granted the UFU full academic accreditation and provided the university with financial support. The UFU received wide recognition for significant and productive teaching, research and publications during its Prague period.

After the Second World War, the UFU established its seat in Munich, Germany. On 16 September 1950, a ministerial decree of the Free State of Bavaria guaranteed the UFU degree-granting privileges. In the ensuing period, various Bavarian university laws and ministerial decrees reaffirmed this academic privilege. Federal German and Bavarian governmental financial support contributed towards worthwhile research, publishing and teaching activities. The university became a recognized Western European scholarly centre, specializing in the study of Ukraine within the USSR and of Ukrainians in the diaspora. Emphasis was placed on the study of Ukrainian history, literature, culture, law and politics. German and Bavarian financial aid ceased in the years following Ukrainian independence, as it was assumed that patronage of the university would be assured by Ukraine. The Ukrainian Ministry of Education recognized UFU doctoral decrees in November 1992. Since 2009, the Ukrainian Free University relies entirely on its own resources, and is not funded by the Ukrainian government.

Over the years, the university has evolved from a "university-in-exile" to a full-fledged, though highly specialized, European Union graduate school. Nevertheless, the UFU has retained many of its remarkable and singular qualities. In its research and publishing activities, the university focuses primarily on Ukraine and things Ukrainian.

== Academic structures ==
The university has three academic structures. The Faculty of Ukrainian Studies concentrates on interdisciplinary Ukrainian studies. Culture, literature and history constitute the core of Ukrainian studies. The Faculty of Philosophy houses the remaining humanitarian disciplines, such as philosophy, fine arts, music, teacher training and religion. The Faculty of Government and Political Economy unites such social science disciplines as political science, economics and business, sociology, psychology and legal studies.

== Academic programs ==
UFU is the only private university in the world which, while located outside of Ukraine, offers graduate programs of study in the social sciences and the humanities, primarily in the Ukrainian language. In fact, in order to be able to matriculate at UFU one must demonstrate fluency in Ukrainian. Masters programs require two or three semesters of course work, an MA thesis and an oral thesis defense. Doctoral programs stipulate three semesters of course work, a doctoral dissertation, philosophy comprehensives and an oral thesis defense. Dissertations are normally written in Ukrainian. In exceptional cases, permission may be granted to write in another language. Winter Semester teaching period runs from early November to mid-December and from the end of January until early March. Summer Semester teaching period is from early May until the end of July.

Most UFU faculty members also hold simultaneously permanent academic positions at European Union, American, Canadian or Ukrainian institutions of higher learning.

== Notable alumni and faculty ==
- Volodymyr Kubiyovych (1900–1985), Ukrainian geographer, cartographer, encyclopedist, politician, and statesman.
- Viktor Petrov
- Nataliia Polonska-Vasylenko
- Jaroslav Rudnyckyj
- Ivan Horbachevsky
- George Yurii Shevelov
- Igor Kaczurowskyj
- Emma Andijewska
- Liubomyr Vynar
- Serhiy Kvit
- Leonid Rudnytzky
- Stefania Turkewich
- Lev Rebet
- Peter Potichnyj

== Bibliography ==
- "Universitas Libera Ucrainensis: 1921–2006", Mykola Szafowal and Roman Yaremko (eds.), ( Munich: Ukrainische Freie Universität, 2006) Series: Varia № 52. ISBN 3-928687-61-1
