= Mikhail Antonevich =

Soviet footballer and coach

Personal information
- Full name: Mikhail Moiseyevich Antonevich
- Date of birth: 5 November 1912
- Place of birth: Hancharowka, Mogilev Governorate, Russian Empire
- Date of death: 6 July 2003 (aged 90)
- Place of death: Moscow, Russia
- Height: 1.72 m (5 ft 8 in)
- Position: Defender

Senior career*
Years	Team	Apps	(Gls)
1934	Mytishchi Plant		
1935–1936	GCOLIFK Moscow		
1937–1939	FC Stalinets Moscow	32	(2)
1940	Dynamo Moscow	0	(0)
1941	Dinamo Minsk	3	(0)
1945–1946	Dinamo Minsk	40	(0)
1947–1951	Lokomotiv Moscow	115	(1)

Managerial career
- 1952–1954: Lokomotiv Moscow (assistant)
- 1957–1959: Terek Grozny
- 1960: Trudovye Rezervy Lugansk
- 1960: Spartak Stanislav
- 1961–1963: Traktor Vladimir
- 1964: Kuban Krasnodar
- 1964: Spartak Ordzhonikidze
- 1965: Traktor Vladimir
- 1966: Progress Kamensk-Shakhtinsky
- 1967–1970: Khimik Novomoskovsk
- 1971–1973: Sura Penza
- 1975–1976: Revtrud Tambov
- * Club domestic league appearances and goals

Mikhail Moiseyevich Antonevich (Russian: Михаил Моисеевич Антоневич; November 5, 1912 – July 6, 2003) was a Soviet football player and coach.

== Playing career ==
In 1934, he played for the team in Mytishchi and in 1935 in Moscow for FC GCOLIFK. In 1936, he spent some time at Spartak Moscow, where he remained on the bench. In the years 1937-1939 he played for the club Stalinec Moscow, and joined Dinamo Moscow. In 1941, he moved to Dinamo Minsk, and played three games, but due to the start of the Great Patriotic War he was forced to suspend performances. From 1944 he continued his career in the Minsk team. In 1947, he was player of Lokomotiv Moscow, where he served as team captain. In 1951, he finished his playing career. He was also an accomplished skier. In 1950, he became an Honored Master of Sports of the USSR.

== Coaching career ==
After retiring he became a football coach. From 1952 to 1954 he helped train Lokomotiv Moscow. From 1957 to 1959 he led FC Terek Grozny (Nieftiannik Grozny). In 1964, he led the Kuban Krasnodar, but soon, in May of this year became manager of Spartak Ordzhonikidze. In 1965, he returned to Traktor Vladimir and later coached numerous other clubs. He died on July 6, 2003, in Moscow.
