= Dmytro Antonovych =

Ukrainian politician

- Дмитро Антонович
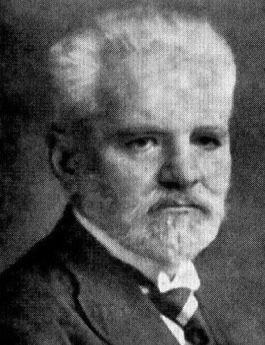

Secretary/Minister of Naval Affairs
- In office 6 January 1918 – 9 February 1918
- Prime Minister: Volodymyr Vynnychenko; Vsevolod Holubovych
- Preceded by: position created
- Succeeded by: position disbanded

Minister of Arts
- In office 26 December 1918 – 13 February 1919
- Prime Minister: Volodymyr Chekhivsky
- Preceded by: position created
- Succeeded by: position disbanded

Personal details
- Born: 14 November 1877 Kyiv, Russian Empire
- Died: 12 October 1945 (aged 67) Prague, Czechoslovakia
- Party: RUP, USDRP
- Spouse: Kateryna Serebriakova
- Children: 3
- Occupation: Historian; politician; diplomat
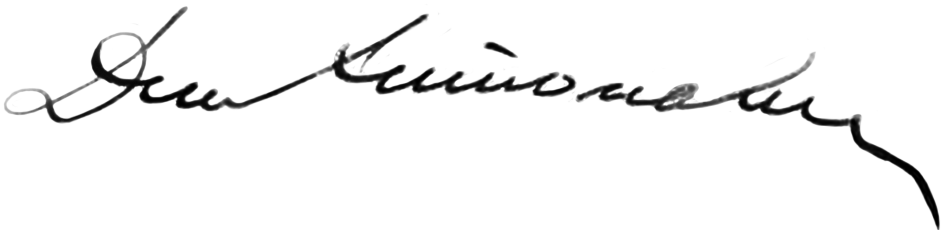
- Signature

Dmytro Volodymyrovych Antonovych (14 November 1877 – 12 October 1945) was a Ukrainian politician and art historian.

== Family ==
Professor Dmytro Antonovych was the son of two Ukrainian historians: his father was Volodymyr Antonovych and his mother was Kateryna Antonovych-Melnyk (1859–1942), an archaeologist from the city of Khorol (today – Poltava Oblast). He married the artist and art historian Kateryna Antonovych, and was the father of Marko Antonovych and Mykhailo Antonovych.

== Career ==
In 1900–1905, he was one of the founders and leaders of the Revolutionary Ukrainian Party (RUP), established in 1900 in the city of Kharkiv, and from 1905, of the Ukrainian Social Democratic Workers' Party (USDRP).

Antonovych was a member of the Ukrainian Central Council, and he served as the minister of naval affairs of the Ukrainian People's Republic, in cabinets headed by Volodymyr Vynnychenko and Vsevolod Holubovych (1917–1918), and the minister of arts in Volodymyr Chekhivsky’s government (1918/1919). Then Antonovych was the president of the Ukrainian diplomatic mission of the UNR in Rome.

His works include Estetychne vykhovannia Shevchenka (Shevchenko's Aesthetic Education, 1914), Ukraïns'ke mystetstvo (Ukrainian Art, 1923), Trysta rokiv ukraïns'koho teatru (1619–1919) (Three Hundred Years of Ukrainian Theater [1619–1919], 1925), T. Shevchenko iak maliar (T. Shevchenko, the Artist, 1937), and Deutsche Einflüsse auf die ukrainische Kunst (1942).
