= Volodymyr Antonovych =

Russian-Ukrainian historian

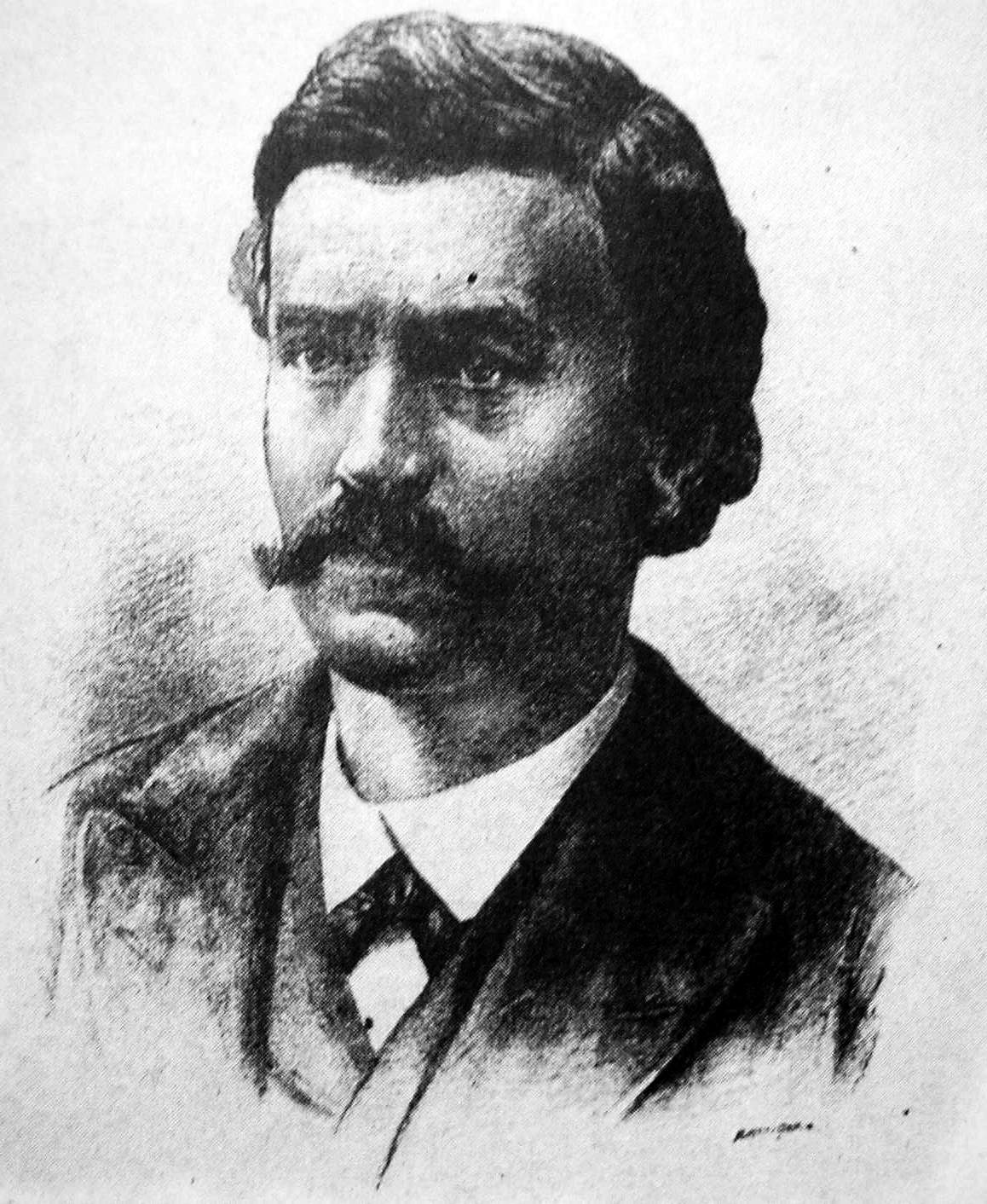
- T. Meyerhoffer. Portrait of V. Antonovych, late 19th century.
- Born: 18 January [O.S. 6 January] 1834; Makhnivka, Berdichevsky Uyezd, Kiev Governorate, Russian Empire
- Died: 21 March [O.S. 8 March] 1908 (aged 74); Kyiv, Russian Empire
- Resting place: Baikove Cemetery, Kyiv, Ukraine
- Education: St. Vladimir Imperial University of Kiev
- Occupations: archeologist, paleographer, historian, ethnographer, and civil activist
- Spouse: Kateryna Melnyk-Antonovych
- Children: Dmytro Antonovych
- Writing career
- Language: Ukrainian, Polish, Russian
- Notable work: Archives of South-Western Russia (8 volumes)

Signature
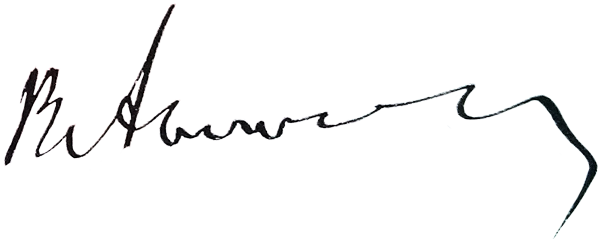

Volodymyr Bonifatiyovych Antonovych (Ukrainian: Володимир Боніфатійович Антонович; Polish: Włodzimierz Antonowicz; Russian: Влади́мир Бонифа́тьевич Антоно́вич, tr. Vladímir Bonifát'evich Antonóvich; 18 January [O.S. 6 January] 1834 – 21 March [O.S. 8 March] 1908) was a prominent Ukrainian historian, archivist and archaeologist, who was known as one of the most prominent figures of the Ukrainian national revival movement in the Russian Empire. Antonovych was a longtime Professor of Russian history at Saint Vladimir Imperial University of Kiev and a correspondent-member of the St. Petersburg Imperial Academy of Sciences. His main work was an edition of the eight-section Archives of South-Western Russia, as head of the Kyiv Archeographic Commission.

== Early life ==
Antonovych was born as Włodzimierz Antonowicz on 18 January [O.S. 6 January] 1834, in the village of Makhnivka, in the Berdichevsky Uyezd of Kiev Governorate, (now Vinnytsia Oblast, Ukraine) to a landless family of impoverished teachers descended from Polish gentry; Antonovych claimed ancestry to the princely Lubomirski family through his mother. According to his contemporary Franciszek Rawita-Gawroński, Antonovych on various occasions claimed his father was either a Pole named Bolesław Antonowicz or a Hungarian wanderer named János Diday. Viktor Korotkyi, a historian specializing in the history of Kyiv University, believed the latter to be Antonovych's biological father.

His mother, Monika Gurska, was a governess. She married Bonifacy Antonowicz, whose surname Włodzimierz would adopt. The couple lived in Makhnivka, and worked as tutors for the children of local wealthy families.

His childhood was spent with his grandmother in Makhnivka. From 1840 to 1844, he was educated by his mother alongside her students. In 1844, Antonowicz continued his studies in the Richelieu Lyceum, Odesa, moving to the 2nd Odesa Gymnasium in 1848. In 1850, he enrolled into the Medical Academy of St. Vladimir Imperial University in Kyiv at the insistence of his mother; he graduated in 1855. During his studies, he joined the circles of Polish democratically minded students and took part in the preparations for what became the January Uprising, under the auspice of the London-based Polish Democratic Society.

From 1855 to 1856, he practiced medicine at Berdychiv and Chornobyl. After the death of his mother in 1856, he returned to St. Vladimir where he studied history and philology under professor Vitaly Shulgin. In 1860, he defended his dissertation About the Trade of Negroes.

== Early political activities ==
In 1857, he co-founded the Związek Trojnicki ("Triple Society"), named after the three Polish territories acquired by Russia in the 18th century: Volhynia, Podilia and the Kyiv area. The society's goal was promoting the abolition of serfdom and persuading the peasants to support Polish independence, while preparing the members for their role in the planned all-national uprising. Due to his involvement, Antonowicz became one of the prominent examples of the "peasant-lovers" (or "Reds"), a loose group of young artists and liberal thinkers fascinated with the peasantry as the "core of the nation".

However, when the January Uprising finally started, the Society divided. Antonowicz, highly critical of the bourgeoisie and the szlachta, sided with the lower classes and left the society, instead forming a Ukrainian society called the Kyiv Community (Київська громада). The conflict between Antonowicz and his university colleagues was further aggravated by the conflict over the Polish language. While most democratic societies decided to appeal to the tsar and ask for the Polish language to be promoted to the status of language of instruction, Antonowicz ultimately opposed those plans. This conflict further strengthened Antonowicz's pro-Ukrainian stance on one side, and the animosity between him and his colleagues on the other, to the extent that he was considered a "renegade" by some.

In 1861 he changed his name to its Ukrainized form and converted to the Orthodox faith, common among the peasants living around Kyiv, as opposed to the Catholicism of the higher class of local society He also married Varvara Ivanovna Mikhels, and started to teach Latin in the 1st Kyiv Gymnasium. During that time, Antonovych was under investigation for traveling with Tadei Rylskyi around Ukrainian villages.

== Career ==
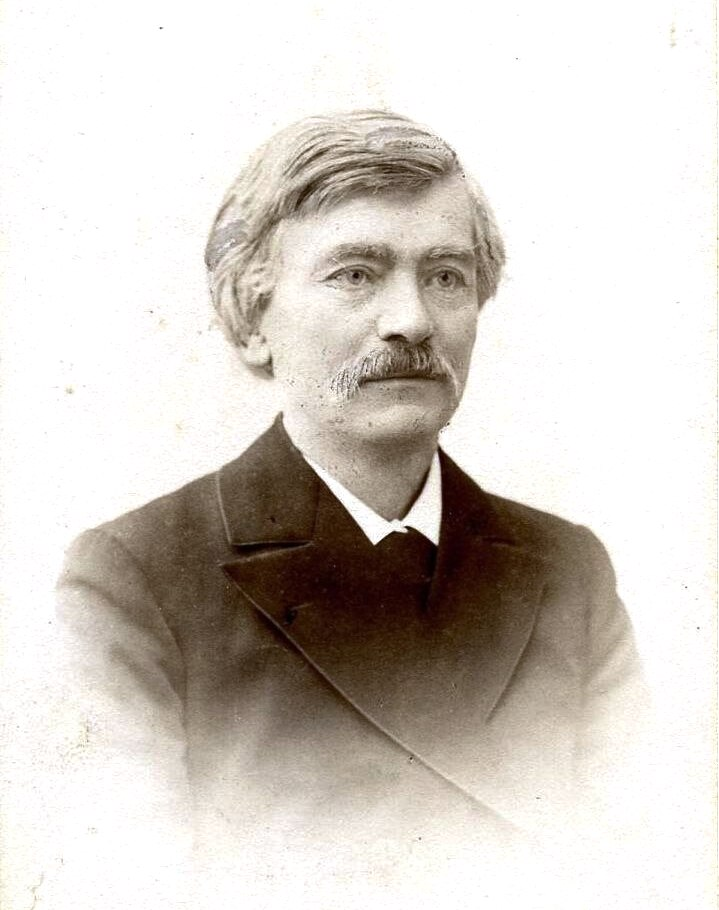
A photo portrait of Volodymyr Antonovych

In July 1863, Antonovych was appointed as a chancellery official to the Governor General of the Southwestern Krai, with an official designation to the Provisional Commission for Review of Ancient Acts (now the Russian Archaeographic Commission). In April 1864, he became its chief editor and held this role until 1880. During his work in the commission, Antonovych edited and published nine volumes of his "Archives of South-Western Russia", a compendium of the history of Right-bank Ukraine during the 16th-18th centuries.

In 1871, he participated in the 2nd Archaeological Congress in Saint Petersburg, he also had role in preparing and conducting the 3rd (1874) and the 9th (1899) archaeological congresses in Kyiv where he made 36 reports. In 1880, Antonovych participated in the Archaeological Congress in Lisbon (so-called the 9th International Congress of Anthropology and Prehistoric Archaeology, predecessor of IUAES).

In 1890 Antonovych served as a mediator in negotiations between Galician viceroy Kazimierz Badeni and representatives of the Ukrainian popular movement in Austria-Hungary, among others Oleksandr Barvinsky. As a result of the talks, a political agreement known as the "New Era" was reached between the Austrian government and Ukrainian political leadership in Galicia, with the former providing a number of concessions in the spheres of education and culture, and the latter breaking ties with Russophiles. The deal opened new perspectives for Ukrainian scholarship in Austrian-governed territories, allowing the creation of a Ukrainian history department at Lviv University, which Antonovych was invited to lead. Due to old age, the scientist refused the proposal but recommended his apprentice Mykhailo Hrushevsky, who after his move to Lviv would also lead the Shevchenko Scientific Society.

In 1897, together with the Ukrainian nobleman Oleksandr Konysky, he established the All-Ukrainian Public Organization.

== Personal views ==
Throughout his career, the imperial censors and oppressive political atmosphere prevented Antonovych from openly expressing his political views, which tended to be egalitarian and somewhat anarchistic. In addition to being a populist, he was a pioneer of positivist methodology in history, the founder of the so-called "Kyiv Documentalist School" of Ukrainian historians, and mentor to Mykhailo Hrushevsky and Kateryna Antonovych-Melnyk.

== Awards ==
In 1870, Antonovych was awarded the Order of St. Stanislav, 2nd degree. In February 1870, the Kyiv University stewardship council confirmed him as a magister of Russian history for his dissertation "Last days of Cossackdom on the right bank of the Dnieper". In the spring of 1870, he was elected as a staff teacher at St. Vladimir Imperial University in the Russian history department. From 1880 to 1883 he served as the dean of the Faculty of History and Philology.

In 1871, the Imperial Senate's department of heraldry confirmed Antonovych as a Court councilor (Надворный советник, nadvorniy sovetnik) the 7th rank in the Table of Ranks, the system that regulated positions and ranks in the military, government, and court of Imperial Russia.

Among Antonovych's students were Pyotr Golubovsky, Dmytro Bahaliy, Mykhailo Hrushevsky, Mytrofan Dovnar-Zapolsky and Ivan Lynnychenko.

== Personal life ==
His wife was Kateryna Antonovych-Melnyk (2 December 1859 – 12 January 1942) who was a Ukrainian historian and archaeologist from the city of Khorol (today – Poltava Oblast). In the 1880s she participated in the archaeological excavations near Shumsk (today – Ternopil Oblast) and in 1885, she visited Ternopil during her travel around the region. Since 1919, Kateryna worked in the National Academy of Sciences of Ukraine.

Volodymyr Antonovych is the father to former Ukrainian minister (and cultural historian in Prague) Dmytro Antonovych and the grandfather of historians Mykhailo Antonovych and Marko Antonovych and of Maryna Rudnytska, professor in the University of Manitoba in Winnipeg, Canada. Maryna Rudnytska was the wife of Jaroslav Rudnyckyj, a Ukrainian-Canadian linguist.

== Commemoration ==
The Central State Historical Archive of Ukraine bore the name of Antonovych in 1941–1943, when its activities were overseen by Oleh Olzhych and Oleksander Ohloblyn under the auspices of the Melnyk wing of the Organization of Ukrainian Nationalists. In modern Ukraine several streets are named after the historian.
