= Hrinchenko =

Hrinchenko is a Ukrainian-language surname. Notable people with the surname include:

- Anastasia Hrinchenko (1884-1908), Ukrainian revolutionary
- Andriy Hrinchenko (born 1986), Ukrainian footballer
- Borys Hrinchenko (1863–1910), Ukrainian writer, activist, historian, publicist and ethnographer
- Maria Hrinchenko (1863–1928), Ukrainian folklorist
- Mykola Hrinchenko (born 1986), Ukrainian footballer
