= Revolutionary Ukrainian Party =

Revolutionary Ukrainian Party Революційна Партія України
- Founder: Dmytro Antonovych; Mykola Porsh
- Founded: 11 February 1900
- Dissolved: 1905
- Split from: Hromada
- Succeeded by: Ukrainian Social Democratic Labour Party
- Headquarters: Kyiv
- Ideology: Socialism; Ukrainian autonomy
- Political position: Left-wing

The Revolutionary Ukrainian Party (Ukrainian: Революційна Партія України), abbreviated RUP (РУП) was a Ukrainian political party in the Russian Empire. Established in 1900 in Kharkiv, it was the first active political organization in the lands of Central and Eastern Ukraine.

== Background ==
The popularity of Socialist ideologies in Ukraine during the late 19th-early 20th centuries was conditioned by the colonial status of Ukrainian lands inside of the Russian Empire. Many Ukrainians saw Socialism not only as an alternative to Capitalism, but also as a way to achieve social and national emancipation. A big role in the emergence of the Ukrainian Socialist movement was played by the raznochintsy group of intelligentsia, whose membership included teachers, doctors, zemstvo officials, agronomists, statisticians and petty bourgeoisie. Unlike higher nobility, that group enjoyed no privileges and had no influence on state policies. The movement for social justice was centered around gymnasium, seminary and university students.

Prominent personalities in the early history of Socialism in Ukraine were Serhiy Podolynsky and Mykhailo Drahomanov. The latter developed narodnik ideas by promoting ideas close to anarcho-socialism, and viewed the future Ukraine as part of a broader federation ruled according to principles of civic self-government. Early proponents of Socialism among the Ukrainian intelligentsia were greatly influenced by the ideas of Russian and European authors such as Tolstoy, Chernyshevsky, Bernstein and Marx. Socialist members of the Ukrainian Radical Party, most prominently Viacheslav Budzynovsky and Yulian Bachynsky, supported Ukraine's political independence, although their fellow party members Ivan Franko and Mykhailo Pavlyk continued to support federalist views.

== History ==
=== Establishment and activities ===
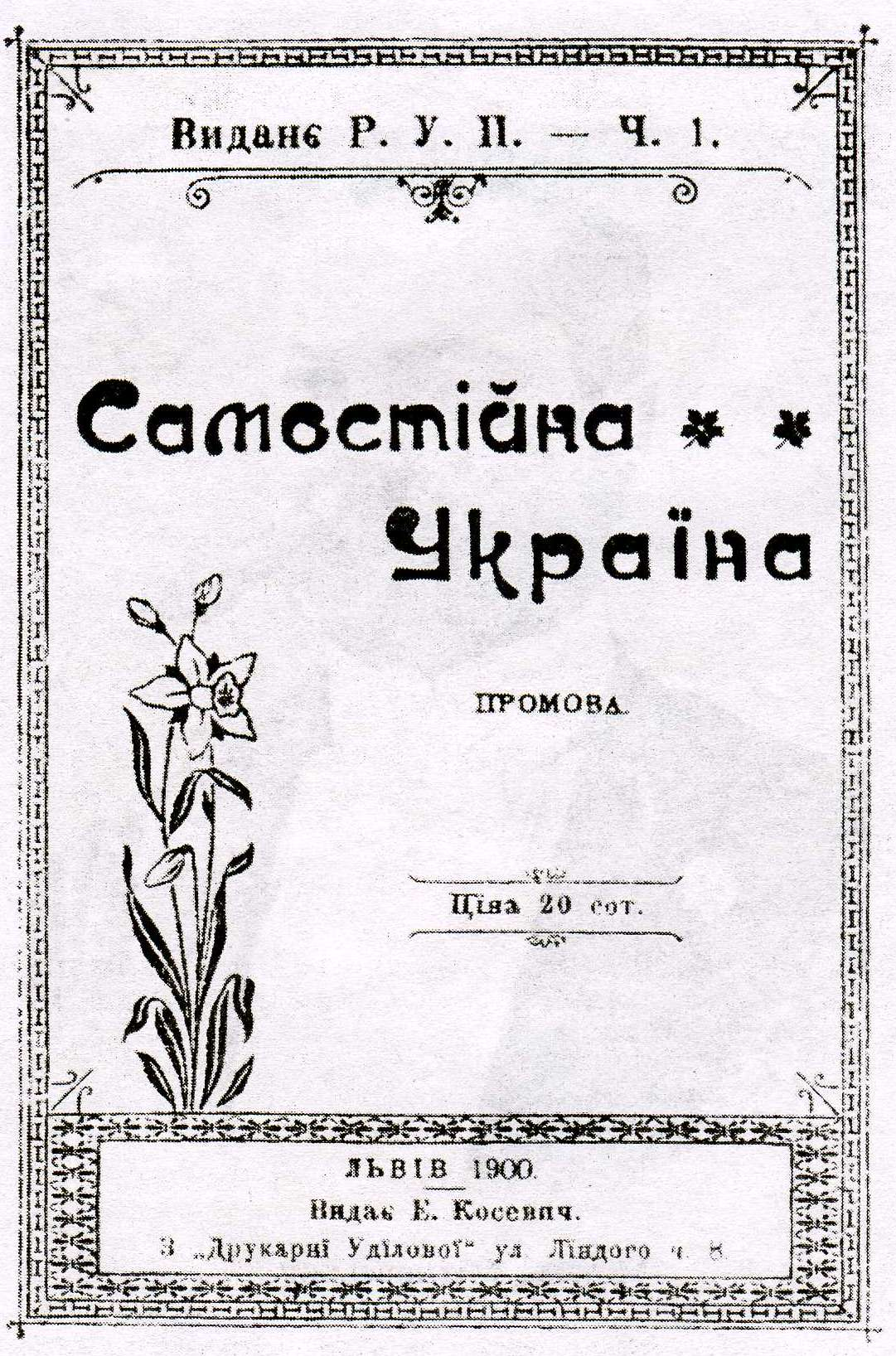
Mikhnovsky's brochure Independent Ukraine, published in 1900

Revolutionary Ukrainian Party was established on 11 February 1900 by members of Kharkiv student Hromada: Dmytro Antonovych, Mykhailo Rusov, Lev Matsiyevych, Bonifatiy Kaminskyi, Panas Andriyevskyi, Yuriy Kollard, Oleksandr Kovalenko and others. It functioned as an underground revolutionary party. The emergence of the party resulted from a successful consummation of preceding attempts by various public associations, such as the Brotherhood of Tarasivtsi and the Social-Democratic Circle of Ivan Steshenko and Lesya Ukrainka. Originally, the aim of R.U.P. was the independence of all Ukrainian national elements. What made the party unique was the willingness to embrace all political philosophies, including Socialism. The party's initial programme was presented in the brochure Independent Ukraine presented by Mykola Mikhnovsky, who was not a party member at the time, and published later that year in Lviv.

RUP was officially established as a single party at its First Congress in December 1902, uniting six party groups based in Kharkiv, Poltava, Kyiv, Nizhyn, Lubny, and Yekaterinodar. Smaller groups of the party were active in Romny, Pryluky, Odessa, Moscow and Saint Petersburg. The congress also elected the party's Central Committee, Foreign Committee and Publication Committee, with the last two being based abroad in Lviv and Chernivtsi. The Central Committee consisted of Dmytro Antonovych, Yevhen Holitsynsky (later replaced by Volodymyr Vynnychenko), Mykhailo Tkachenko, and V. Kozynenko, while the Foreign Committee was headed by Antonovych and Vynnychenko.

During the early period of its existence, RUP supported methods of terror and armed actions against the tsarist regime and big landowners. In 1902 it organized peasant strikes in the regions of Poltava and Kharkiv. The party's members engaged in propaganda against the rural and urban proletariat, and cooperated with socialist parties of other ethnicities living in Ukraine, such as the Jewish Bund, RSDLP, Polish Socialist Party and Russian Social Revolutionaries.

In 1903, the party turned away from its original nationalistic program of an independent Ukraine and adopted a new course based on principles and goals of international social democracy based on the Erfurt Program. That same year RUP was joined by the Kyiv-based Ukrainian Socialist Party, which was created by students and Ukrainophiles from Kyiv's Polish community and supported views expressed in the programme of the Polish Socialist Party. In the same year, many members of RUP were arrested, while others fled to Lemberg. Marian Melenevsky became the head of the Foreign Committee.

In 1904, Mykola Porsh became the new leader of RUP. Under him the party shifted its focus away from peasantry, instead concentrating on the Ukrainian urban proletariat. In August RUP member Yevhen Holitsynsky participated in the International Socialist Congress in Amsterdam; however, due to the objection issued by RSDLP against the presence of a separate Ukrainian representative, he was forced to join their delegation at the event.

=== Split ===
In 1902, the party's right wing established the Ukrainian People's Party under the leadership and influence of Mykola Mikhnovsky. The UPP adopted Mikhnovsky's nationalist program with minor socialist elements. The party was active during the Russian Revolution of 1905-1907, but was criticized for alleged demagoguery and dishonesty in respect to its real political position. After the emergence of the Central Rada, it renamed itself the Ukrainian Party of the Socialist-Independentists (UPSS). According the party's members, the exclusion of the term "Socialist" into its name was caused by the general fashion of the time rather than by its real political allegiance.

In December 1904, the Second Congress of the RUP took place which culminated in a split with Marian Melenevsky, who in January 1905 led the more Marxist members to establish the Ukrainian Social Democratic Union (Spilka), which would later become an autonomous entity of the RSDLP and was instrumental during the Revolution of 1905 in Ukraine before disbanding in 1907.

In December 1905, the majority of RUP members voted to rename the party into Ukrainian Social Democratic Labour Party (USDLP).

== Ideology and media activities ==
The discussion between supporters of pro-independentist views and promoters of a federal resolution, which spread to Russian-ruled Dnieper Ukraine, resulted in the publication of Mykola Mikhnovsky's pamphlet Independent Ukraine. According to Ivan Lysiak-Rudnytsky, that publication expressed the worldview of young members of the Revolutionary Ukrainian Party, who combined formulas of simplified Marxism with romantic patriotism. Mikhnovsky's brochure issued the motto of "one, united, indivisible, free, independent Ukrainian state from the Carpathians and up to the Caucasus", and presented a demand to return Ukraine's national rights defined by the Pereyaslav Agreement of 1654 and spread their action to the whole Ukrainian ethnic territory inside of the Russian Empire.

Another significant publication of the RUP, Uncle Dmytro, was published by Dmytro Antonovych on the base of a reworked pamphlet issued by the Polish Socialist Party. Addressed to Ukrainian peasants, it showed the Russian imperial tax system as unjust, and was soon followed by another brochure, Does corvée still exist in our days? These works demonstrated the predominantly peasant orientation of the RUP, which was characteristic of the broader Ukrainian Socialist movement at the time. Later publications of the party included several newspapers, brochures and pocketbooks, a series on the history of Cossacks, translations of articles by August Bebel, Karl Liebknecht and Karl Kautsky, publications of works by Volodymyr Vynnychenko and Oleksandr Skoropys-Yoltukhovsky etc. The party produced its printed materials in Chernivtsi and Lviv, and would also employ underground printing shops in lands of Central and Eastern Ukraine.

== Legacy ==
Former members of RUP would play an active part in Ukrainian political organizations such as the USDLP, Union for the Liberation of Ukraine, governments of the Ukrainian People's Republic, and also engaged in literary and scientific activities. The party's activities contributed to the education of a new generation of Ukrainian political activists and helped mobilize Ukrainian peasantry and proletariat in its struggle for better working conditions and national rights. Having abandoned the culture-oriented agenda of the preceding Ukrainophile movement, RUP transformed the Ukrainian movement into a political force and established connections with political and social movements of other peoples, and organized contacts with Ukrainian political parties and organizations in Galicia and Bukovina.

== Notable members ==
- Volodymyr Chekhivskyi (1876–1937), Prime Minister of the Ukrainian People's Republic (1918–1919)
- Anastasia Hrinchenko (1884–1908), daughter of Ukrainian writer Borys Hrinchenko
- Andriy Livytskyi (1879–1954), President of the Ukrainian People's Republic in exile after 1926
- Mykola Voronyi (1871–1938), Ukrainian poet
- Anastasia Hrinchenko (1884–1908), Ukrainian revolutionary and publicist
