= Spilka =

Ukrainian political party

The Spilka (Ukrainian: Українська соціал-демократична спілка - Ukrainian Social-Democratic Union) was a Ukrainian Social Democratic political organization which was active in parts of the Ukrainian ethnic territory ruled by the Russian Empire.

== History ==
Spilka was founded in December 1904. Having broken away from the Revolutionary Ukrainian Party, members of Spilka oriented their propaganda work among on Ukrainian workers and peasants. It entered the Russian Social Democratic Labour Party as an autonomous regional organisation. In the inner-Party struggle of the R.S.D.L.P. Spilka sided with the Mensheviks together with the Jewish Bund. By 1907 the organization had almost 6,000 members and was an important part of the Menshevik Party in Ukraine. It broke up in the period of reaction. In 1912 there were only small disconnected groups of the Spilka and by then most of its members had turned nationalists. First two issues of Trotsky's Pravda (Vienna) were published as an organ of the Spilka in October and December 1908.
