= Polubotkivtsi uprising =

July 1917 insurrection in Kiev

Polubotok Military Club mutiny
- Part of Ukrainian War of Independence
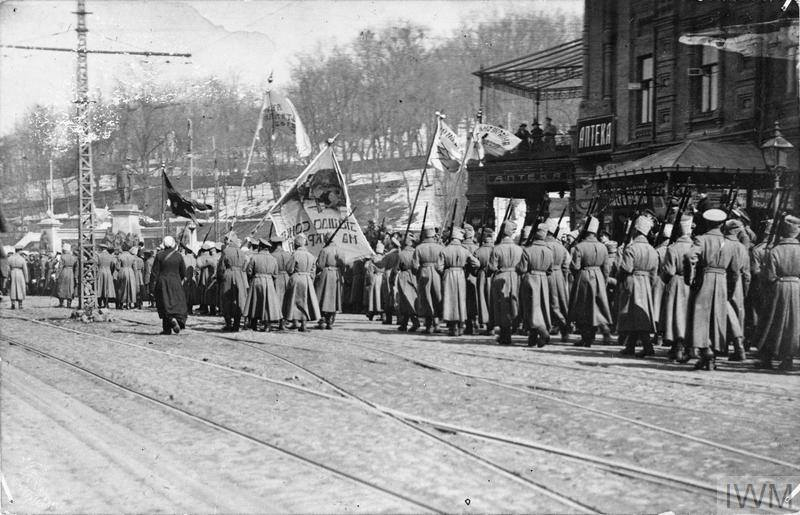
- Polubotkivtsi in the downtown Kiev.
- Date: July 17, 1917
- Location: Hrushky suburb, Kiev, Russian Republic
- Caused by: 2nd Universal of the Central Council (16 July 1917)
- Goals: Independence of Ukraine; Disagreement with policy of the Central Council; Recognition of the 2nd Ukrainian military formation
- Methods: negotiations, military insubrodination, use of small firearms
- Result: Disarmament of mutinied soldiers and sending them to frontlines (collaterally - collapse of the Kerensky Offensive, July Days)

Parties
Local government: Central Council; Kiev Military District; Ukrainian General Military Committee	Military volunteers: Polubotok Military Club; 2nd Ukrainian Regiment of Pavlo Polubotok (projected); 1st Ukrainian Regiment of Bohdan Khmelnytsky

Lead figures
Symon Petlyura; Konstantin Oberuchev; Volodymyr Vynnychenko; Oleksandr Shulhyn	Mykola Mikhnovsky (suspected) (Note: According to Serhiy Shemet) poruchik Romanovsky; Yuriy Kapkan

Casualties
- Deaths: 4

The Polubotok Club Affair was an important national civil affair and an armed revolt of the Kiev garrison troops that took place on July 17–18, 1917 in Kiev soon after the collapse of the Kerensky Offensive (July 16). It was part of a Ukrainian military movement, one of key roles played by the public organization Ukrainian Military Club of Pavlo Polubotok.

The rebels' main goal was an immediate proclamation of Ukrainian independence. The rebellion itself had several political and social reasons. Soldiers of the Cossack regiment deeply lacked food supplies and medicines, experienced poor living conditions. Among the political reasons were those that the Central Council of Ukraine obtained pale national and military policy. In whole, more than 10 thousand soldiers and most of the population of Kiev found themselves in the center of the revolt.

The uprising was later stifled due to the effective counter-actions of the Ukrainian officials and leaders of the Russian Kiev Military District. The participants of the revolt were mainly exiled to the Romanian World War I frontlines, where many soon died. The ideologist of the disorder is considered the contemporary nationalist leader of that time Mykola Mikhnovsky although there is no direct and clear evidences of his involvement in those events.

== Causes and preceding events ==
Ukrainian military movement has rapidly developed after establishment of the Ukrainian military club in March 1917. It was closely cooperated with the clandestine Fraternity of Independentists led by Valentyn Otamanovsky.

=== Fraternity of Independentists and conspiracy ===
Ukrainian politician and researcher of the Ukrainian liberation movement from Horlivka, Roman Koval, points out the fact that on 27 June 1917 took place a conference of the clandestine Kiev organization Fraternity of Independentists where it discussed pacifistic policies of the Central Council of Ukraine. A discussion about the attempt of armed coup split. One urged to decisively replace the autonomy-seeking politicians with the military dictatorship headed by Hetman. Others claimed that it would bring a ruin in society and the coup should be directed exclusively against Russians. Koval also mentioned that in June 1917 Mykola Mikhnovsky joined the organization.

The commander of the First Ukrainian regiment Yuriy Kapkan, whom Mikhnovsky had intended to play an important role in the coup, disclosed Mikhnovsky's plans to Volodymyr Vynnychenko.

=== Russian government delegation ===
On 2 July 1917 a Russian government delegation headed by Alexander Kerensky visit Kiev after the declaration of the First Universal of Central Council that called for autonomous status of the Russian Southwestern Krai.

== See also ==
- July Days, same timeframe in Saint Petersburg.
