= Mykola Hrinchenko =

Ukrainian footballer

Mykola Hrinchenko Микола Грінченко
Personal information
- Full name: Mykola Hrinchenko
- Date of birth: 27 February 1986 (age 40)
- Place of birth: Ukrainian SSR, Soviet Union
- Height: 1.78 m (5 ft 10 in)
- Position: Midfielder

Youth career
- 2004: Arsenal Kharkiv

Senior career*
Years	Team	Apps	(Gls)
2005–2010	Kharkiv	35	(3)
2006	→ Kharkiv-2	6	(0)
2011	Slavutych Cherkasy	3	(0)
2017–2018	Enerhetyk Solonytsivka		
- * Club domestic league appearances and goals

Mykola Volodymyrovych Hrinchenko (Ukrainian: Микола Володимирович Грінченко; born 27 February 1986) is a professional Ukrainian former football midfielder.
