= Nyzhnia Syrovatka =

Village in Sumy Oblast, Ukraine

Nyzhnia Syrovatka Нижня Сироватка
- Village
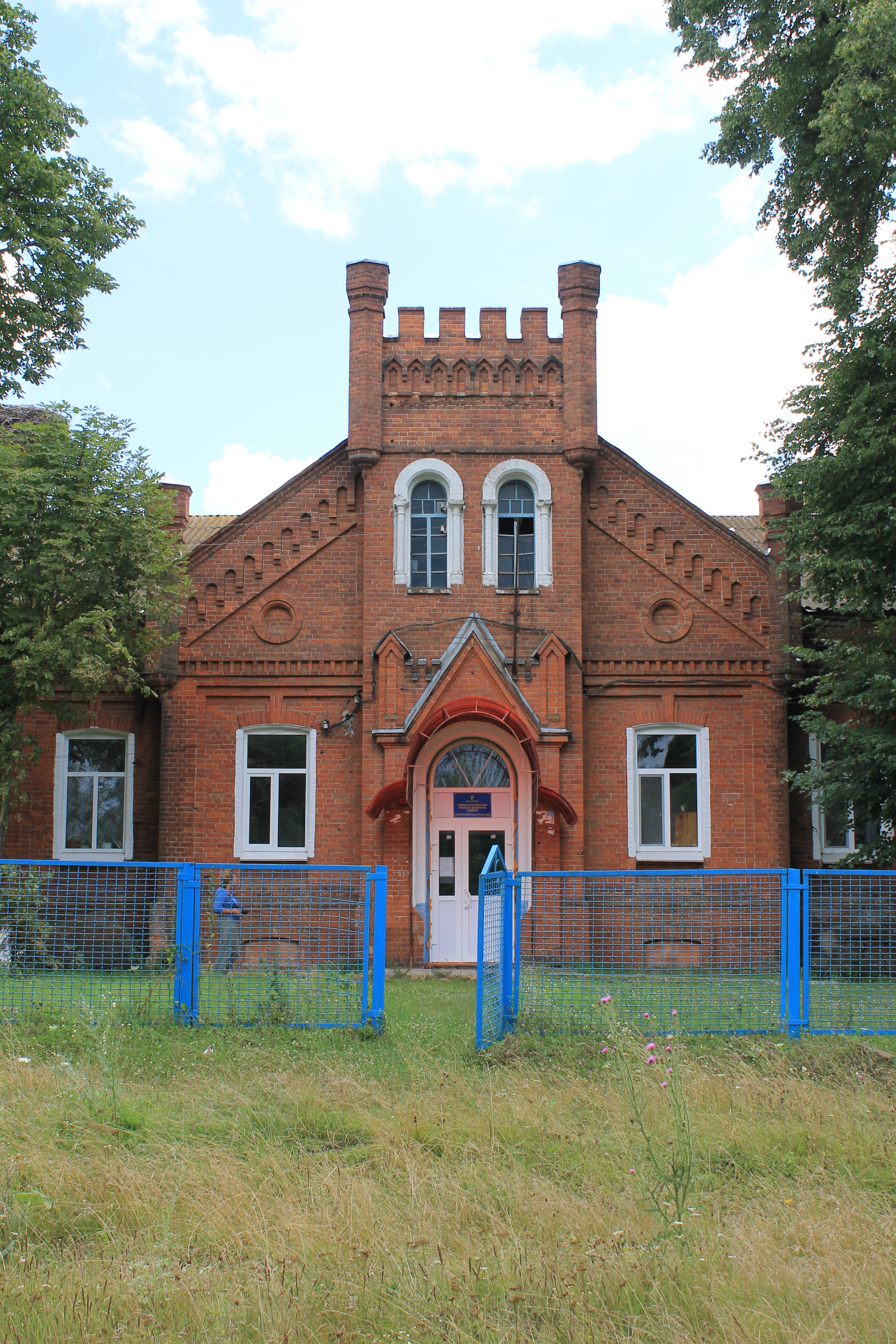

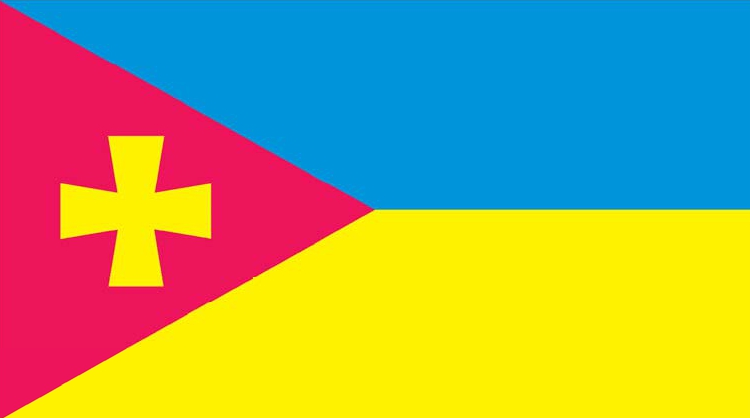
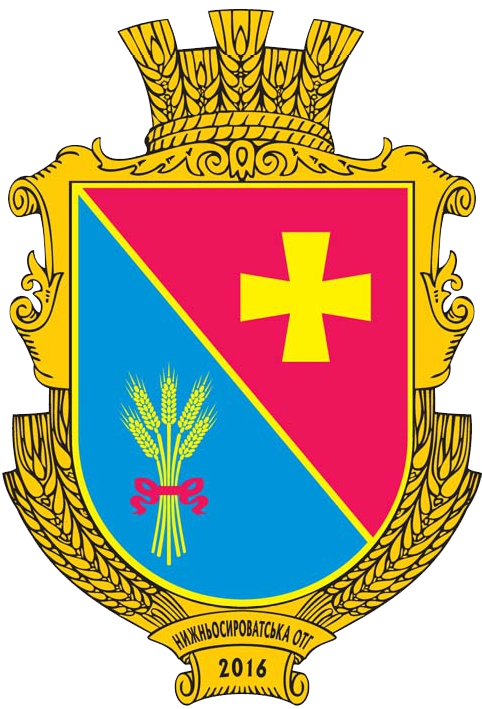
- Flag Coat of arms

- Location of Nyzhnia Syrovatka in Sumy Oblast Location of Nyzhnia Syrovatka in Ukraine
- Coordinates: 50°46′53″N 34°50′17″E
- Country: Ukraine
- Oblast: Sumy Oblast
- Raion: Sumy Raion
- Hromada: Nyzhnia Syrovatka rural hromada
- Established: 1659

Population
  - Total: 3,717

Nyzhnia Syrovatka (Ukrainian: Нижня Сироватка) is a village in Sumy Raion, Sumy Oblast, in central Ukraine. It is the capital of Nyzhnia Syrovatka rural hromada, one of the hromadas of Ukraine. Its population is 3,717 (as of 2024).

== History ==
Nyzhnia Syrovatka was founded in 1659. Its residents participated in the Russian Revolution of 1905, as well as protests against World War I. Red Army soldiers occupied the village in January 1918.

130 inhabitants of the village died in the Holodomor.

1,024 inhabitants of Nyzhnia Syrovatka fought for the Red Army in World War II. Following the war, four memorials to Soviet soldiers were constructed in the village.

== Notable people ==
- Anastasia Hrinchenko (1884–1908), Ukrainian author and revolutionary
