= Independent Ukraine =

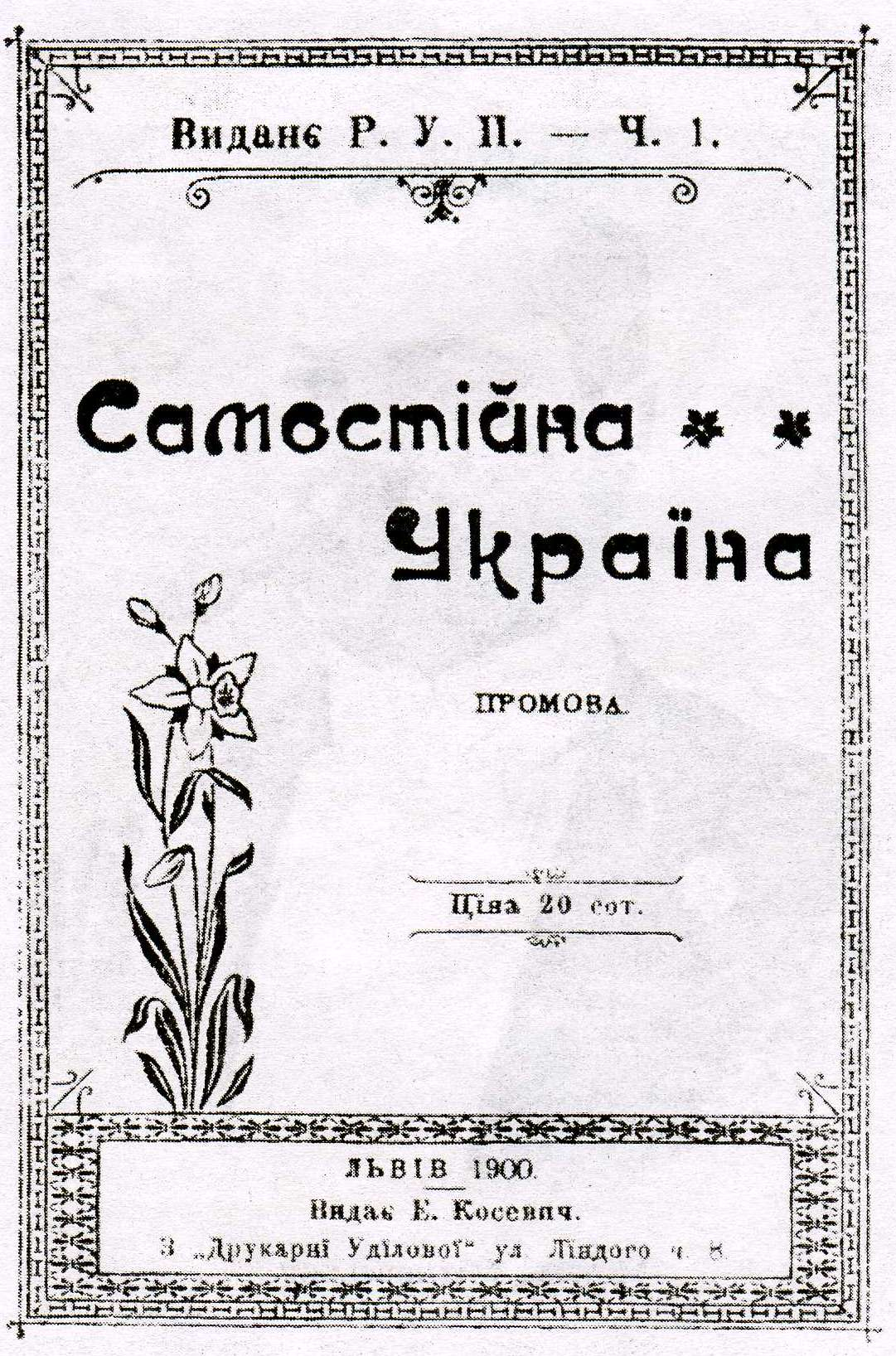
Front cover

"Independent Ukraine" (Ukrainian: Самостійна Україна) is a political pamphlet published in 1900 by Mykola Mikhnovsky in support of the Revolutionary Ukrainian Party. It is one of the first articulations for a modern, independent Ukrainian state.
