= Anastasia Hrinchenko =

Ukrainian political activist

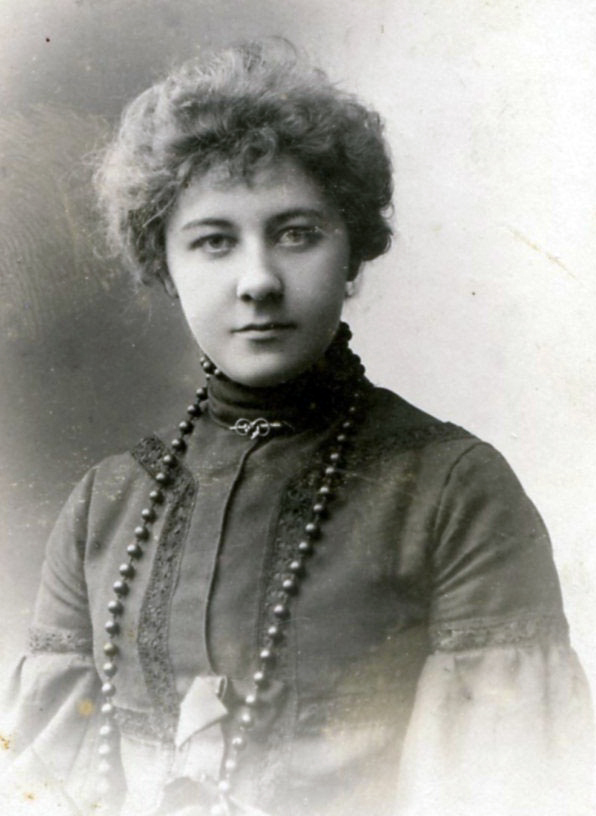
Anastasia Hrinchenko during her studies in Lviv

Anastasia Borysivna Hrinchenko (Ukrainian: Анастасія Борисівна Грінченко; 25 (O.S. 13) December 1884–14 (1) October 1908) was a Ukrainian revolutionary, political activist and author. She was persecuted by Russian authorities for her political activities and died under house arrest while awaiting trial.

== Biography ==
Anastasia (Nastia) Hrinchenko was born on 25 December 1884 in the village of Nyzhnia Syrovatka, then part of Sumy povit in Kharkov Governorate. Her parents were Ukrainian writers Borys and Maria Hrinchenko. When Nastia was six, her father co-founded the Taras Brotherhood, a society whose members aimed to achieve independence for Ukraine. In 1895 Anastasia enetered a gymnasium in Chernihiv.

In 1902 the family moved to Kyiv, where Nastia graduated from school. During that time she entered a secret hromada managed by the Revolutionary Ukrainian Party (RUP), whose member she became in 1903. During the same year Nastia entered the Philosophical faculty of Lviv University, where she attended lectures by Mykhailo Hrushevsky, Oleksander Kolessa and Kyrylo Studynsky. In Lviv she entered a girls' circle at a local institute, whose members discussed the issues of Ukrainian women's political and social rights. In 1904 Anastasia worked as a foreign agent of RUP, editing the party's press, forging passports and helping to transport banned publications across the border into Dnieper Ukraine.

In 1905, following the start of the revolution, Anastasia returned to Kyiv, engaging in revolutionary propaganda among local workers and took part in demonstrations. In late 1905 she moved to Poltava, where she for some time managed an illegal printing shop. Soon thereafter she was forced to move to Lubny, where she contributed to the establishment of a workers' militia tasked with fighting the Black Hundreds. During preparations for a RUP party congress, on 28 December 1905 Anastasia was arrested and transported to Lukyanivka Prison. In March 1906, along with five fellow political prisoners, she sent a letter to the central committee of the Ukrainian Social Democratic Labour Party, urging its leadership to turn the organization into a regional branch of the Russian Social Democratic Labour Party (RSDLP).

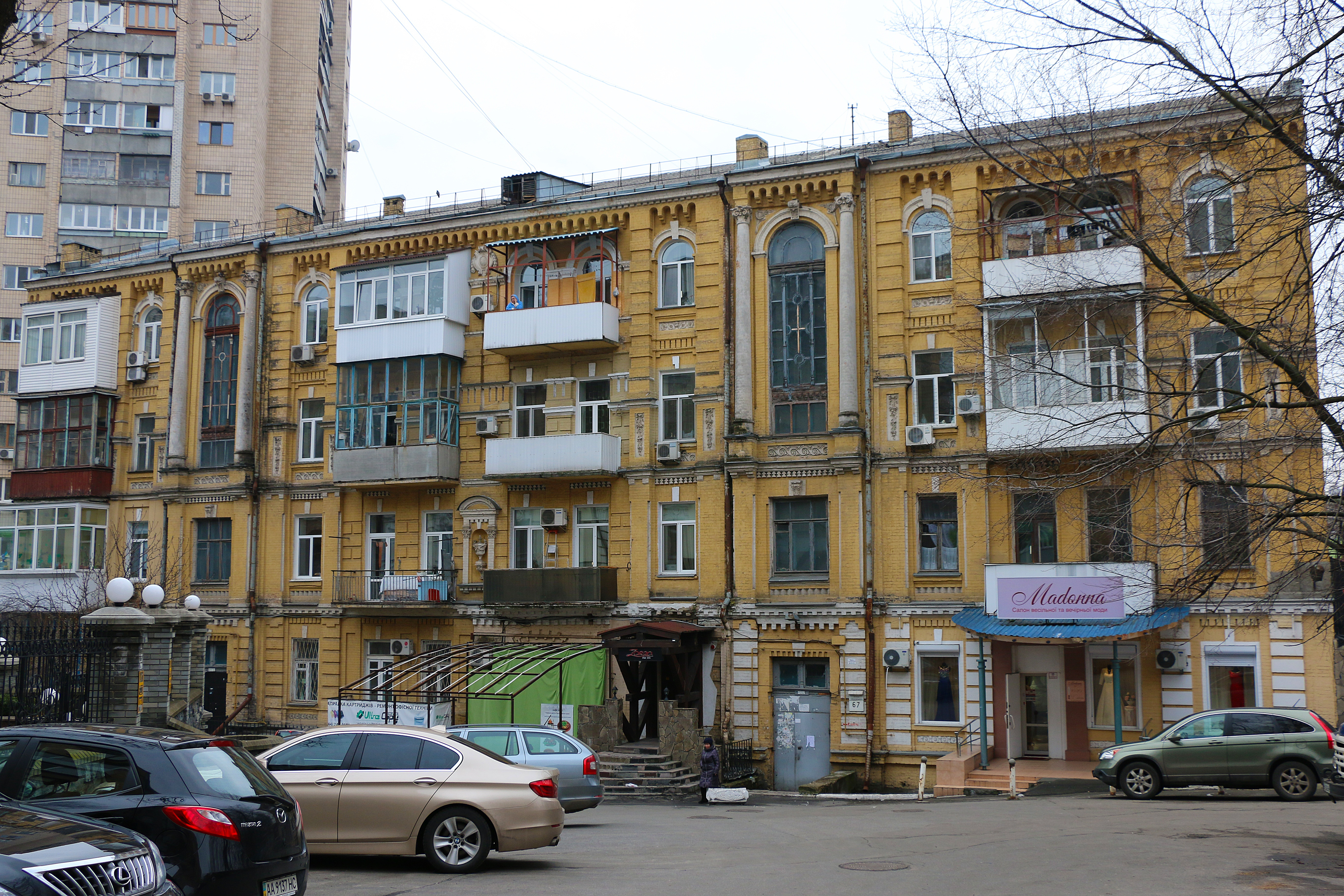
Modern view of the building in Kyiv, where Anastasia lived with her parents in 1907-1908

After being released from imprisonment due to lack of evidence and intervention of her parents, Anastasia joined the RSDLP and worked as a party propagandist in Hadiach, Konotop and Kyiv. She was also active as an editor and translator. Anastasia remained under police supervision, and her living quarters were subject to numerous searches, which, along with poor conditions she had survived in prison, contributed to the weakening of her health. In October 1907, due to a fabricated report to the police, Anastasia was arrested for a second time and put under house arrest after being released on bail thanks to the intervention of her father. By that time, she was pregnant and suffered from tuberculosis. Her civil partner remained under arrest awaiting trial, and Anastasia herself was threatened with katorga in case of conviction. Despite this, during 1908 she published translations of seven literary works.

On 19 April 1908 Anastasia gave birth to a boy; her condition worsened soon thereafter, and she suffered from fever and hallucinations. Anastasia Hrinchenko died on 1 October 1908, reportedly from a heart ailment. Her recently born son died shortly thereafter in February 1909, and was soon followed by her father, who had been greatly affected by the double loss in his family.

== Literary works ==
Anastasia Hrinchenko became known as an author of lyrical poems, fables, short stories and critical articles. In 1907 she published a scientific article titled The Idea of Federalism among the Decembrists. She also created Ukrainian translations of works by Olive Schreiner, Mark Twain, Hermann Sudermann, Georg Brandes, Anatole France and Henrik Ibsen.
