= Mykola Mikhnovsky =

Ukrainian independence activist, lawyer, and journalist

Mykola Mikhnovskyi
- Микола Міхновський
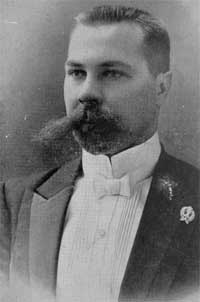

Personal details
- Born: Mykola Ivanovich Mikhnovsky; 31 March 1873 Turivka, Russian Empire (now Brovary Raion, Kyiv Oblast, Ukraine)
- Died: 3 May 1924 (aged 51) Kyiv, Ukrainian SSR, Soviet Union (now Ukraine)
- Party: Revolutionary Ukrainian Party
- Education: Kyiv University
- Occupation: Independence activist; lawyer; journalist

Military service
- Allegiance: Russian Empire
- Branch/service: Imperial Russian Army
- Years of service: 1914–1917
- Rank: Lieutenant
- Battles/wars: World War I Russian Civil War

Mykola Ivanovych Mikhnovskyi (Ukrainian: Микола Іванович Міхновський; 31 March [O.S. 19 March] 1873 – 3 May 1924) was a Ukrainian independence activist, lawyer and journalist who was one of the early leaders of the Ukrainian nationalist movement in the late 19th and early 20th centuries. Mikhnovsky was the author of the pamphlet Independent Ukraine, one of the organisers of the Ukrainian People's Army, and co-founder of the first political party in eastern Ukraine, the Revolutionary Ukrainian Party, as well as the co-founder and leader of various other parties, including the Ukrainian People's Party, the Ukrainian Democratic Party, and the Brotherhood for Self-Determination.

== Early life and education ==
Mykola Mikhnovsky was born in the village of Turivka on 31 March 1873. The son of a priest, Mikhnovsky's family was primarily Cossack, with roots going back to the 17th century. He spent his childhood in the countryside, listening to folk songs and stories. His worldviews were influenced by his father, who shaped his "spirit of independence". His father held church services in the Ukrainian language. Mykola was educated in the town of Pryluky. After graduating from high school in 1890, he studied Law at Kyiv University.

== Student independence activism ==
The growth of Ukrainian national consciousness in the late 19th century led to a rift among the Ukrainian intelligentsia. The older generation approached the "Ukrainian question" through culture and education, limiting their demands to moderate reforms that would have abolished the national-cultural restrictions for Ukrainian within the Russian Empire. The younger generation, however, were attracted to socialist ideals. They believed that national liberation could be achieved through a common struggle with other nations against the existing social order in Russia. In the early 1890s, a new trend developed. It was started by a Mikhnovsky, a student who openly declared the state independence of the Ukrainian nation. He began to preach boldly, that the only way to gain state independence was through armed conflict and that this was the only path for the Ukrainian people.

As a freshman at the Kyiv University, Mikhnovsky joined the Ukrainian national movement and became a member of the "Young community". However, cultural and apolitical activities did not satisfy him. As a radical-minded young man, in 1891 he formed a secret student organization. The first Ukrainian national organization with a clearly political purpose was founded by a group of students from Kharkiv and Kyiv Universities, which in summer 1891 took the oath of allegiance to Ukraine, and founded a secret political society, named the "Taras Fraternity" in honour of Ukrainian national leader Taras Shevchenko. Initially, the centre of the organization was Kharkiv until the summer of 1893 (when most members of the organization were arrested), then Kyiv. It also had branches in Odessa, Poltava and Lubny.

Mikhnovsky, though he was not among the founders, soon became the ideologue and leader of the fraternity. As a law student, he developed an ideological platform, known as the "Credo of a Young Ukrainian." The Taras Fraternity declared its goal to fight for "an independent sovereign Ukraine, united, whole and undivided, from the San to the Kuban rivers, from the Carpathians to the Caucasus, between the free-free, with no master and no boor, without the class struggle within the federation".

The case of the Taras Fraternity seemed almost hopeless, but Mikhnovsky spread their views. These performances were unpopular and remained unrecognized by most Ukrainian leaders. The propaganda of the Taras Fraternity had no noticeable success. Yet, throughout Ukraine isolated supporters appeared who shared their views, not only among students, but also including peasants, petty bourgeoisie, and intelligentsia. The organization ceased to exist after 1893, as part of Taras Fraternity were arrested, and most of those not arrested were sent into exile.

Mikhnovsky was lucky to escape arrest. He graduated and began working in one of the lawyers' offices in Kyiv. However, Mikhnovsky did not abandon his social activities. In 1897, he travelled to the city, which had established close relationships with western leaders and purchased a large number of illegal publications, including works by Mykhailo Drahomanov and Ivan Franko. Police believed that he was an anti-government figure.

== Political activities ==
In 1898, Mikhnovsky moved to Kharkiv, where he became a lawyer and a prominent Ukrainian independence activist. In 1900, he became one of the founding members of Revolutionary Ukrainian Party, which became the first Ukrainian political party under Russian rule. In response to the spread of Marxist ideas in RUP, in 1902 some of its members organized a new organization called Ukrainian People's Party, of which Mikhnovsky became a leader. After the 1905 Revolution, Mikhnovsky founded a few Ukrainian newspapers and, in 1909, helped to create a mutual credit society in Kharkiv. As a member of Ukrainian liberation movement, he also took part in organizing terror attacks against Russian monuments, one of which succeeded (the pedestal of the monument to Alexander Pushkin in Kharkiv was destroyed).

Mikhnovskyy's "Ten Commandments" for the Ukrainian People's Party labelled Jews, Poles, Russians, Hungarians, Romanians enemies "for as long as they ruled and exploited us [Ukrainians]." He condemned intermarriage with foreigners. The Ukrainian People's Party did not become popular, and existed for 5 years before dissolving.

== Ukrainian Revolution ==
After the outbreak of the First World War, Mikhnovsky joined the Imperial Russian Army. After a short stay at the front as a lieutenant, he became a lawyer in Kyiv, in the military district court. There, he proposed to create Ukrainian national units in the Imperial Russian Army. In March 1917 he joined the Ukrainian Central Council and headed the newly created Polubotok Military Club, aiming to create a separate Ukrainian military. After the Central Council refused to support the club, its members started a coup attempt, which ended in a failure. Mikhnovsky was detained by the gendarmerie and sent for military service to the Romanian Front (without direct evidence of his involvement in the coup, nor an official investigation).

After the October Revolution in Russia, he returned to Ukraine and entered the Ukrainian Democratic Peasant Party (UDKhP), founded by Vyacheslav Lypynsky. When German armies occupied Ukraine and installed the Hetmanate regime, Mikhnovsky opposed the rule of hetman Pavlo Skoropadskyi, but refused to take part in a coup to topple him. Skoropadskyi contemplated offering Mikhnovsky the post of Prime Minister of Ukraine, but instead offered him the position of personal adviser. Mikhnovsky refused this offer.

In late 1918 the socialist Directorate took power in Kyiv. Mikhnovsky considered the new government to be extremist and incompetent, and his party plotted to replace its leadership either with colonel Petro Bolbochan or Sich Riflemen leader Yevhen Konovalets. However, in 1919 Mikhnovsky contracted typhus. After being temporarily arrested by the Bolsheviks, he left politics and next year left Ukraine for Kuban. As he was unable to evacuate together with the White forces, Mikhnovsky settled in Poltavskaya, working as a teacher.

== Return to Ukraine and death ==
In 1924 Mikhnovsky returned to Kyiv, where he was arrested by GPU, but released in a short time. On 3 May 1924, Mikhnovsky was found hanged in a garden belonging to his long-time political ally Volodymyr Shemet. Officially his death was ruled a suicide, however, there were rumours of Soviet secret services' involvement.

== Legacy ==
During the era of Soviet rule in Ukraine, public mention of Mikhnovsky was forbidden, as he was considered a Ukrainian bourgeois nationalist. After Ukrainian independence, a number of memorial plates and monuments were installed in his memory, including one in Kharkiv. In 2016, as part of Ukraine's decommunization process, Kharkiv's Anna Khoperska Street (a Soviet revolutionary) was renamed to Mykola Mikhnovsky Street.

In December 2022 the Druzhby Narodiv (or Friendship of Peoples) boulevard in Kyiv was renamed to Mykola Mikhnovsky boulevard.

On 20 May 2024 the Poltava city council renamed a street in its city in honour of Mikhnovsky.
