= Borys Hrinchenko =

Ukrainian writer, political activist, historian, and ethnographer

- Борис Грінченко
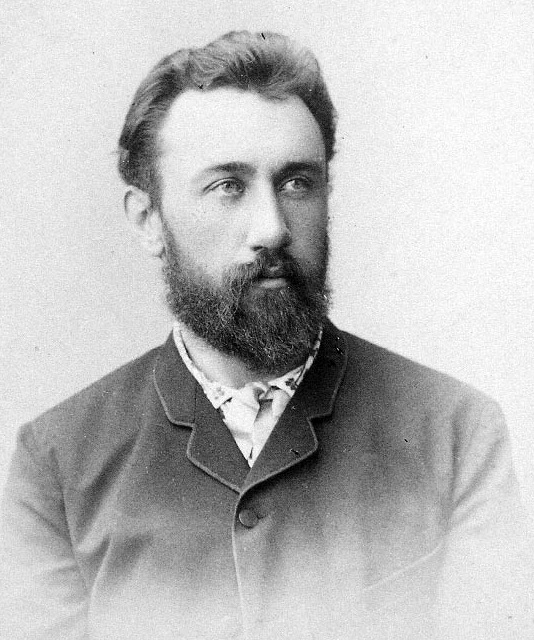
- Hrinchenko during his time in Kharkiv, c. 1885
- Born: December 9, 1863; Ruski Tyshky, Kharkiv Governorate, Russian Empire
- Died: May 6, 1910 (aged 46); Ospedaletti, Province of Imperia, Italy
- Resting place: Baikove Cemetery, Kyiv
- Citizenship: Russian Empire (subject)
- Education: Kharkiv University
- Occupations: Prose writer; poet; pedagogue; ethnographer; historian; publicist; activist; politician
- Spouse: Maria Gladylina
- Children: Anastasiia (Nastia) Hrinchenko
- Writing career
- Pen name: Vasyl Chaichenko
- Language: Ukrainian, Russian
- Period: 1880s–1910
- Genres: Novels; poems; articles; ballads
- Subjects: Nationalism; anti-chauvinism; cultural revival
- Notable work: To my countrymen (1898)

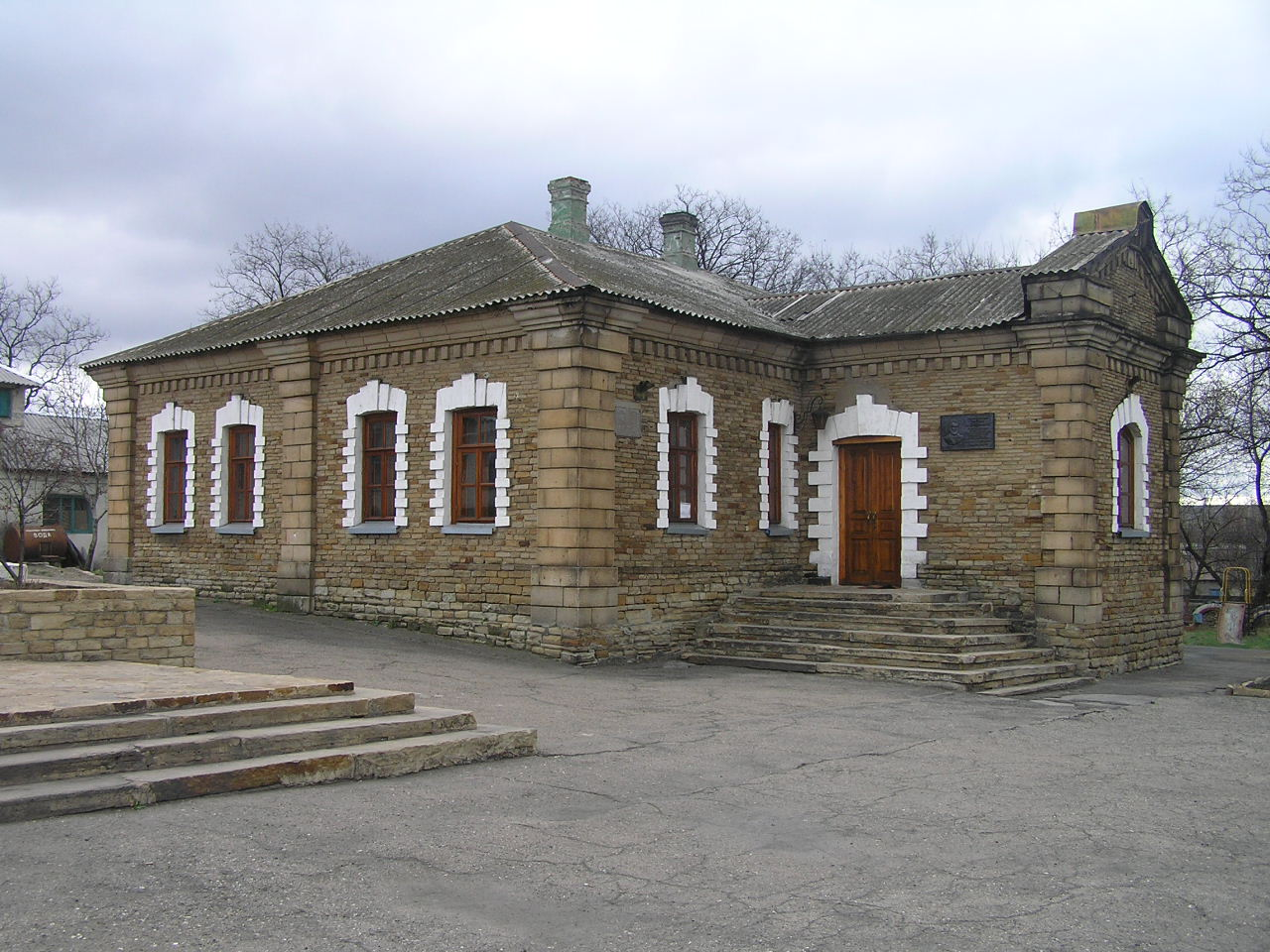
Museum of Borys Hrinchenko in Perevalsk Raion, Donbas, former private school of Khrystyna, the wife of Oleksiy Alchevskyi

Borys Dmytrovych Hrinchenko (Ukrainian: Борис Дмитрович Грінченко, pronounced [boˈrɪz‿ˈdmɪtrowɪd͡ʒ‿ɦrʲinˈt͡ʃɛnko]; December 9, 1863 – May 6, 1910) was a classical Ukrainian prose writer, political activist, historian, publicist, and ethnographer. He was instrumental in the Ukrainian cultural revival of the late 19th and beginning of the 20th centuries.

Author of the first dictionary of the Ukrainian language together with his wife, Maria Hrinchenko, and editor of a number of Ukrainian periodicals, he advocated the spread of the Ukrainian language in schools and institutions.

Hrinchenko was an editor of various Ukrainian periodicals. He was one of the founders of the Ukrainian Democratic Party. Hrinchenko also was an author of seminal ethnographic, lexicographic, and pedagogical works, literary studies, historical reviews, the first textbooks in the Ukrainian language, particularly Native word, the school-book for reading. He was an editor of the four-volume Словарь української мови (Ukrainian Dictionary; "Kievskaia starina" publishing, Kyiv 1907–1909).

One of the organizers and the first director of the Prosvita Society in Kyiv.

== Biography ==
Borys Hrinchenko was born on December 9, 1863, in the khutir of Vilkhovy Yar, in the Kharkiv Governorate of the Russian Empire (today the village of Prylisne, in Vilkhivka rural hromada, Kharkiv Raion), and was baptized in the Archangel-Michael church in the village of Borshcheve. His father was a retired army officer of an impoverished noble heritage. His mother Poliksenia Litryova, a daughter of a colonel. His family possessed 19 desyatinas (20.7575 ha (51.293 acres)) of land, mostly forest and a water mill. His father knew Ukrainian well and used it only when talking with neighboring peasants, whereas at home everyone in the family spoke Russian.

Before enrolling in the Kharkiv city secondary school (so called realschule), young Hrinchenko was home schooled. In 1874, he entered the Kharkiv Real School, studying there until 1879. It was there that, under the influence of "Kobzar", he began to collect and record songs, legends, fairy tales and other folklore materials. Borys Hrinchenko called Walter Scott, George Byron, Victor Hugo, Alexander Pushkin, Nikolay Nekrasov and Aleksey Koltsov his "first literary teachers." They contributed to the formation of his strong-willed character.

During his school years in Kharkiv Hrinchenko became close to the populist circles, studying and distributing their publications. On 29 December 1879, studying in fifth grade, he was arrested and imprisoned for possession and distribution" of Serhiy Podolynsky's banned book "Steam Machine" (Ukrainian: Парова машина, 1875). He was excluded from school and spent couple of months in prison where he became sick with tuberculosis. This was the end of Hrinchenko's training: from now on, he had to earn his own bread. For some time Borys lived in a shoemaker's family. Having learned to sew boots, he bought books for the money saved from his earnings and engaged in self-education.

Acquired self-education allowed Hrinchenko to pass exams for the title of public teacher at Kharkiv University. Between 1881 and 1893 he taught in the villages of Slobozhanshchina and Katerynoslavshchyna, except for the period of 1886–1887, when he was a statistician in the Kherson Provincial Zemstvo. In 1887 Hrinchenko lived with his young wife, Maria, in the Donbas in the village of Oleksiyivka (Katerynoslav province, now Luhansk region) and worked at the folk school of Khrystyna Alchevska. In 1891, the Brotherhood of Tarasivtsi was founded, and Hrinchenko soon became its active member. During that time his works were regularly published in magazines and almanacs and included poetry collections "Songs of Vasyl Chaichenko" (1884), "Under the Village Roof" (1886), "Under the Cloudy Sky" (1893), "Songs and Thoughts" (1895), and "Minutes" (1903).

From 1884 to 1900, Hrinchenko worked at the Chernihiv Zemstvo and actively cooperated with the local Hromada. At the expense of Ivan Cherevatenko, he organized the publishing of popular Ukrainian-language books in Dnieper Ukraine (On Thunder and Lightning, The Great Sahara Desert, Jeanne d'Arc, biographies of Ivan Kotlyarevsky, Yevhen Hrebinka, Hryhoriy Kvitka-Osnovyanenko, and others). In 1895 Hrinchenko's brochure A Nation Under Oppression (Ukrainian: Нарід в неволі), criticizing the Russian government's policy of Russification and assimilation, was published in Lviv, and later translated into Russian, French and German languages.

While working at the zemstvo, Hrinchenko wrote a dilogy "In the middle of the dark night" (1901) and "Under the quiet willows" (1902), published plays "Forest Stars" (1897), "Cloud" (1897), "Steppe Guest" (1898), "Among the Storms" (1899), "On Public Work" (1901). B. Hrinchenko was an extremely hard-working man. Being a patriot, he published "Ethnographic Materials Collected in Chernihiv and Neighboring Provinces" in three volumes (1895–1899), "From the Mouth" (1900), and "Literature of Ukrainian Folklore (1777-1900)" (1901).

In 1902, the writer moved to Kyiv. Here, together with his wife Maria Zahirna, he worked on compiling his top work, the four-volume Dictionary of the Ukrainian Language (1907–1909). This outstanding work was awarded an academic prize.

At the end of 1904, he headed the left wing of the UDP, which formed the Ukrainian Radical Party, and at the end of 1905, it merged with the UDP into the Ukrainian Democratic Radical Party. From 1906, he was an employee of the newspaper Hromadska Dumka and editor of the magazine Nova Hromada. From 1906 to 1909, he headed the Kyiv Prosvita. Hrinchenko belonged to the group of the most prominent representatives of Ukrainian populism. During the period of the greatest scale of the great-power chauvinist policy of the Russian government in Ukraine, he advocated the consistent conduct of national and cultural work among Ukrainian society. He expressed his political views in his program of the UDRP and in "Letters from Dnieper Ukraine" (Bukovina newspaper, 1892–1893).

In 1905, on the initiative of Hrinchenko and others, the All-Ukrainian Teachers' Union (VUUS) was formed as a professional Ukrainian organization of teachers and public educators.

After the return of Mykhailo Hrushevsky from Lviv to Kyiv, Hrinchenko sowed enmity and distrust of everything Galician (his personal motive was his disapproval of Mykhailo Hrushevsky).

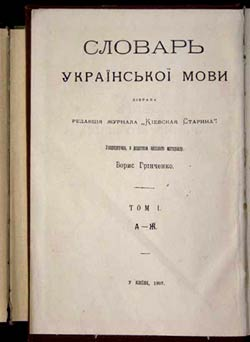
Hrinchenko's Dictionary of Ukrainian Language, 1907

On behalf of the Kyiv Community, he collected materials and edited the Dictionary of the Ukrainian Language for 2 years, including into it 70,000 Ukrainian words from literary works and folklore sources. The dictionary was published in 4 volumes (vols. 1–4, 1907–1909). This work by Hrinchenko received an award from the Russian Academy of Sciences. It was an outstanding work of the early twentieth century, which was republished for the second time in 49 years.

The writer's health, undermined by tuberculosis (the consequence of his Kharkiv imprisonment), could not withstand the tense, continuous rhythm of work. The death of his daughter Nastya and her young son greatly affected Hrinchenko. The sharp exacerbation of the disease forced him to go for treatment in the Kingdom of Italy.

Borys Hrinchenko died on May 6, 1910, in the town of Ospedaletti in Liguria, Italy and was buried in Kyiv's Baikove Cemetery. He was survived by his wife, Maria Hrinchenko.

== Bibliographic activity ==
Hrinchenko was one of the active contributors to the critical and bibliographic department of the Zorya magazine. He published his consolidated works on the current bibliography under the title "News of Ukrainian Literature" and "New Ukrainian Books" under the pseudonyms V. Chainenko and V. Vilkhivsky. These were information and bibliographic messages with cursory evaluations of publications or collections of reviews. The bibliographer submitted such a consolidated material in 1886 and 1889. In the 1890s he published separate reviews in Zora, and sometimes evaluated Lviv books. Hrinchenko demanded that the Zorya editorial office work systematically on current bibliographic information, pointed to insufficient review of Galician printing houses, omissions of certain works, and advocated the publication of reviews of monthly periodicals.

Hrinchenko paid special attention to literature for public reading. He dedicated a special article "Popular Books" to it, often responding to novelties in this literature.

== Works ==
He began his literary career in the 1880s. Author of about 50 short stories ("Wonderful Girl", 1884; "Exam", 1884; "Without Bread", 1884; "Alone, All Alone", 1885; "Olesya", 1890; "Stolen", 1891; "Bell", 1897, etc.), novels ("Sunbeam", 1890; "At the Crossroads", 1891; "In the Middle of the Dark Night", 1900; "Under the Silent Willows", 1901), and collections of poetry ("Songs of Vasily Chaichenko", 1884; "Under the village roof", 1886; "Under the cloudy sky", 1893, etc.).

Dramas are devoted to the historical theme: "Among the Storms" (1897), "The Steppe Guest" (1897), and "Clear Stars" (1884-1900).

He translated works by Friedrich Schiller, Johann-Wolfgang Goethe, Heinrich Heine, Victor Hugo and others.

He organized and published in three books "Ethnographic materials collected in Chernihiv and neighboring provinces" (vols. 1–3, 1895–99). He owns valuable collections of folk art "Songs and Thoughts" (1895), "Dumas of the Kobzar" (1897), "Merry Storyteller" (1898), "From the mouth of the people. Little Russian stories, fairy tales, etc. " (1901) and others.

Working fruitfully in the field of public education, he set out his pedagogical views in the works: "What is now a public school in Ukraine" (1896), "People's teachers and the Ukrainian school" (1906), "On the path of ignorance. About the Ukrainian school "(1906) and others. He fought for the education of Ukrainian children in their native language, advocated the purity of the Ukrainian literary language. He created several school textbooks, including "Ukrainian Grammar", "Native Word".

One of the brightest works of Hrinchenko is the poem "To compatriots who once a year gather to sing the anthem on Shevchenko's anniversary" (1898), in which the poet expressed his vision of the attitude of the Ukrainian pseudo-intelligentsia to Ukraine.

== Memory ==
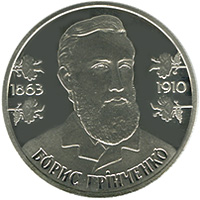
Coin of Ukraine dedicated to Borys Hrinchenko

- A monument to Borys Hrinchenko was unveiled in Kyiv on August 22, 2011 (sculptor Mykola Obeziuk and architect Mykola Bosenko).
- The Taras Shevchenko All-Ukrainian Enlightenment Society annually awards the Borys Hrinchenko Prize to scientists, educators, public and political figures who have made a significant contribution to the development of independent Ukraine, the establishment of the state Ukrainian language, development of national culture, revival of historical memory and formation of national consciousness. and raising the spirituality and well-being of the Ukrainian people, educational and ascetic activities in the name of Ukraine.
- On July 4, 2012, the Ukrainian Parliament adopted the Resolution "On the celebration of the 150th anniversary of the birth of Borys Hrinchenko".
- On November 22, 2013, the National Bank of Ukraine put into circulation a commemorative coin "Borys Hrinchenko" with a face value of ₴2.
- Hrinchenko Streets in Lviv and Kyiv.
- The village of Hrinchenkove (Chupakhivka rural hromada) in the Sumy region

=== Borys Hrinchenko Kyiv University ===
Scientific and pedagogical staff, students of the Borys Hrinchenko Kyiv University take care of the grave of the Scientist in Kyiv at the Baykove Cemetery.

To the 145th anniversary of B. Hrinchenko's birth, a badge "For personal contribution to the development of the University" was developed and a nominal scholarship for the best students was introduced.

The first badge "For personal contribution to the development of the University" with a bas-relief of Hrinchenko was given to the wife of the former rector of the Interregional Institute for Teacher Training Victor Hryhorovych Slyusarenko (now deceased).

In 2011, on the occasion of the 20th anniversary of Ukraine's independence, a monument to Borys Hrinchenko was unveiled in Kyiv, built at the expense of teachers and students of the Borys Hrinchenko Kyiv University with the support of the Kyiv City State Administration.

Biographical and literary portal "Hrinchenko online" contains the results of research on the life and work of Boris Dmitrievich, as well as the most complete library of his works on the Internet, the uniqueness of which lies in the chronological categorizer by periods of artistic activity. The resource was developed by computer science students Ivan Stepura and Milana Sablina, who took the first place with him at the All-Ukrainian student scientific-practical conference "Boris Hrinchenko through the eyes of students of the XXI century".

=== Museum in Luhansk region ===
The Hrinchenko Memorial Museum is located in the village of Oleksiyivka, Perevalsk District. “A short steppe path leads to the museum. In the yard of Oleksiyivska School there is an old building, in front of which stands a monument to a talented teacher, prominent writer and publicist, critic and linguist, publisher and public figure - Borys Dmytrovych Hrinchenko. "

The Resolution of the Verkhovna Rada of 2013 on the celebration of the 150th anniversary of the birth of Borys Hrinchenko noted that by the date of birth (December 9) the Luhansk Regional Council and Luhansk Regional State Administration will provide repair and restoration work at the Hrinchenko Memorial Museum in Mykhailivka, Perevalsk district, Luhansk region.

== English Translations ==
English translations of Borys Hrinchenko's works include:

- "Brother against Brother";
- "January 9th"

== Bibliography ==
- Bibliography at Goodreads
