= Anatoly Samoilenko =

Ukrainian mathematician (1938–2020)

Anatoly Mykhailovych Samoilenko
- Born: 2 January 1938; Potiivka, Ukraine SSR, Soviet Union
- Died: 4 December 2020 (aged 82); Kyiv, Ukraine
- Education: Taras Shevchenko National University of Kyiv
- Known for: Significant contribution to multifrequency oscillations theory, impulsive differential equations theory
- Scientific career
- Fields: mathematics
- Workplaces: Institute of Mathematics of NAS of Ukraine

Anatoly Mykhailovych Samoilenko (Ukrainian: Анато́лій Миха́йлович Само́йленко) (2 January 1938 – 4 December 2020) was a Ukrainian mathematician, an Academician of the National Academy of Sciences of Ukraine (since 1995), the Director of the Institute of Mathematics of the National Academy of Sciences of Ukraine (since 1988).

== Early life ==
Anatoly Samoilenko was born in 1938 in the village of Potiivka, Radomyshl district, Zhytomyr region. In 1955, he entered the Geologic Department at the Shevchenko Kyiv State University. In 1960, Samoilenko graduated from the Department of Mechanics and Mathematics at the Shevchenko Kyiv State University with a mathematics specialization. His first scientific works were published.

== Early career ==
In 1963, after graduation from the postgraduate courses at the Institute of Mathematics of the Academy of Sciences of the Ukrainian SSR, Samoilenko defended his candidate-degree thesis "Application of Asymptotic Methods to the Investigation of Nonlinear Differential Equations with Irregular Right-Hand Side" and began work at the Institute of Mathematics of the Academy of Sciences of the Ukrainian SSR under the supervision of Yurii Mitropolskii. After research work, Samoilenko became a leading expert in the qualitative theory of differential equations. In 1967, based on the results of his research in the theory of multifrequency oscillations, he defended his doctoral-degree thesis "Some Problems of the Theory of Periodic and Quasiperiodic Systems", the official opponents of which were V. I. Arnold and D. V. Anosov.

== Academic career ==
Between 1965–74, Samoilenko worked as a senior research fellow at the Institute of Mathematics of the Academy of Sciences of the Ukrainian SSR and gave lectures at the Shevchenko Kyiv State University. In 1974, he obtained the professor degree. In 1978, he was elected to become a Corresponding Member of the Institute of Mathematics of the Academy of Sciences of the Ukrainian SSR. His monograph brought him worldwide recognition. This monograph was written by Samoilenko together with his teachers, Academicians N. N. Bogolyubov and Yurii Mitropolskii. 36 years later, Samoilenko reminisced, "In Kyiv, at the Institute of Mathematics, great scientists were my teachers... In many fields of science, they were 'trendsetters' on the scale of the Soviet Union. It is very important for a young scientist to belong to a serious scientific school. Probably, only in this case he has a chance to obtain results at the world level. The atmosphere of a good scientific school itself stimulates a young scientist to carry out his research work at the cutting edge of modern science. And if he suddenly opens a new direction in science, then his name immediately gains recognition".

In 1974–1987, Samoilenko headed the Chair of Integral and Differential Equations of the Department of Mechanics and Mathematics at the Shevchenko Kyiv State University. These years were marked by especially high scientific activity of the chair. Based on results of the research in the theory of differential equations with delay performed at that time, the monograph of Mitropolskiy, Samoilenko, and D. I. Martynyuk was published. At the same time, Samoilenko, together with his disciple M. O. Perestyuk, published the well-known monograph devoted to the theory of impulsive differential equations. These monographs (especially their English translations) are frequently cited in scientific literature.

Since 1987, Samoilenko has headed the Department of Ordinary Differential Equations at the Institute of Mathematics of the Academy of Sciences of the Ukrainian SSR (at present, the Department of Differential Equations and Theory of Oscillations at the Institute of Mathematics of the National Academy of Sciences of Ukraine), and since 1988 he has been the Director of the Institute of Mathematics of the National Academy of Sciences of Ukraine. The beginning of this fruitful creative period was marked by the fundamental monograph devoted to the qualitative theory of invariant manifolds of dynamical systems. This monograph served as a foundation for the construction of the general perturbation theory of invariant tori of nonlinear dynamical systems on a torus. The English version of this monograph is also well known. Three years later, the monograph of Samoilenko (in coauthorship with Mitropol'skii and V. L. Kulyk) was published. In this monograph, in particular, the method of Lyapunov functions was used for the investigation of dichotomies in linear differential systems of the general form. The results of many-year investigations of constructive methods in the theory of boundary-valued problems for ordinary differential equations carried out by Samoilenko together with M. Ronto are presented in monographs. Constructive algorithms for finding solutions of boundary-value problems with different classes of multipoint boundary conditions were developed by Samoilenko, V. M. Laptyns'kyi, and K. Kenzhebaev; the obtained results are presented in monograph. Complex classes of resonance boundary-value problems whose linear pan cannot be described by Fredholm operators of index zero were investigated by Samoilenko, together with O. A. Boichuk and V. F. Zhuravlev, in monographs. The monograph of Samoilenko and Yu. V. Teplins'kyi is devoted to the theory of countable systems of ordinary differential equations. The monographs of Samoilenko and R. I. Petryshyn cover a broad class of qualitative problems in the theory of nonlinear dynamical systems on a torus.

== Work ==
Samoilenko is the author of about 400 scientific works, including 30 monographs and 15 textbooks, most of which have been translated. His monographs made an important contribution to mathematical science and education. According to MathSciNet, the scientific papers of Samoilenko have been cited 336 times by 208 authors.

Samoilenko's scientific interests covered a range of problems in the qualitative theory of differential equations, nonlinear mechanics, and the theory of nonlinear oscillations. His results in the theory of multifrequency oscillations, perturbation theory of toroidal manifolds, asymptotic methods of nonlinear mechanics, theory of impulsive systems, theory of differential equations with delay, and theory of boundary-value problems were appreciated in Ukraine and abroad. Samoilenko was the founder of a scientific school in the theory of multifrequency oscillations and theory of impulsive systems recognized by the international mathematical community. His many-year guidance of the Institute of Mathematics of the Ukrainian National Academy of Sciences furthered the development of mathematics in Ukraine and the continuation of the traditions of the Bogolyubov – Krylov – Mitropolskiy Kyiv scientific school.

The recognition of Samoilenko's mathematical results is illustrated by notions well known in the mathematical literature such as the Samoilenko numerical-analytic method and the Samoilenko – Green function (the kernel of an integral operator related to the problem of an invariant torus of a dynamical system).

He gave lectures at the Shevchenko Kyiv National University and the "Kyiv Polytechnic Institute" National Technical University and guided the scientific work of postgraduate and doctoral students. Despite the extremely busy schedule of his work as the Director of the Institute of Mathematics of the Ukrainian National Academy of Sciences for about 20 last years (since 2006, he was the Academician-Secretary of the Department of Mathematics at the National Academy of Sciences of Ukraine), Samoilenko found time for organizational and public activities. In particular, Samoilenko was the President of the "Foundation for Support of the Development of Mathematical Sciences" All-Ukrainian charity organization.

He created an international scientific school in differential equations. Among his students, there are 33 doctors and 82 candidates of physical and mathematical sciences, who are now researchers of scientific institutions, professors, heads of chairs, deans, and rectors (scientific researchers, pedagogs, and administrators). For example, Samoilenko's alma mater (the Department of Mechanics and Mathematics at the Shevchenko Kyiv National University) has been headed for many years by his disciples (Professors M. O. Perestyuk and I. O. Parasyuk). Among other scientists belonging to Samoilenko's mathematical school, one may mention Professor Kenzhebaev, the rector of the Zhubanov Aktobe University, and Academician M. Ilolov, the President of the Tajik Academy of Sciences.

== Memberships ==
Samoilenko was a member of the Ukrainian Mathematical Society, the American Mathematical Society, and the editorial boards of numerous Ukrainian and foreign mathematical journals, among which there are Differential Equations, Reports of the National Academy of Sciences of Ukraine, In the world of mathematics, Nonlinear Mathematical Physics, Memoirs on Differential Equations and Mathematical Physics, and Miskolc Mathematical Notes. He is an editor-in-chief of the Ukrainian Mathematical Journal, Nonlinear Oscillations journal and the Ukrainian Mathematical Bulletin.

Samoilenko was a full member of the National Academy of Sciences of Ukraine (since 1995) and the European Academy of Sciences (since 2002). He was a Foreign Member of the Tajik Academy of Sciences (since 2011).

== Awards ==
Samoilenko was awarded Order of Friendship of Peoples (1984), and Order of Merit of degree III (2003), Order of Prince Yaroslav the Wise of degree V (2008), a Diploma of the Presidium of the Supreme Soviet of Ukraine (1987), and the titles of an Honored Scientist of Ukraine (1998) and a Soros Professor (1998). He was also awarded the State Prize of Ukraine in the Field of Science and Engineering (1985 and 1996), State Prize of Ukraine in the field of education (2012), Ostrovsky Prize (1968), Krylov Prize (1981), Bogolyubov Prize (1998), Lavrentyev Prize (2000), Ostrogradsky Prize (2004) and Mitropolskiy Prize (2010).
