= Oleksandr Sharkovsky =

Ukrainian mathematician (1936–2022)

- Олександр Шарковський
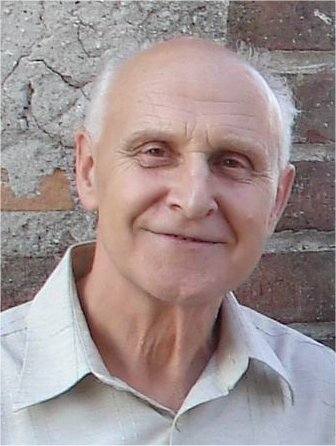
- Sharkovsky in 2006
- Born: 7 December 1936; Kyiv, Ukrainian SSR, Soviet Union
- Died: 21 November 2022 (aged 85); Kyiv, Ukraine
- Other names: O.M. Sharkovskyi, O.M. Sharkovskii, O.M. Sharkovskyy, O.M. Šarkovskii, O.M. Sharkovs’kyi
- Citizenship: Soviet Union (1936-1991); Ukraine (1991-2022)
- Education: Taras Shevchenko National University of Kyiv
- Known for: Sharkovsky's theorem
- Scientific career
- Fields: Mathematics, Dynamical systems, Differential and difference equations, Mathematical physics, Topology
- Workplaces: Institute of Mathematics of the National Academy of Sciences of Ukraine
- Thesis: Some questions in the theory of one-dimensional iterative processes (1961)
- Doctoral advisor: Yurii Mitropolskiy
- Doctoral students: Iryna Sushko
- Website: imath.kiev.ua/~asharkov/

Oleksandr Mykolayovych Sharkovsky (Note: also Sharkovskyi, Sharkovskyy, Sharkovs’kyi, sometimes Šarkovskii or Sarkovskii) (Ukrainian: Олекса́ндр Миколайович Шарко́вський; 7 December 1936 – 21 November 2022) was a Ukrainian mathematician most famous for developing Sharkovsky's theorem on the periods of discrete dynamical systems in 1964.

He was a corresponding member of the Academy of Sciences of the Ukrainian SSR (1978), and academician of the National Academy of Sciences of Ukraine (2006). Prize laureate of the National Academy of Sciences of Ukraine named after M. M. Bogolyubov and M. O. Lavretiev.

== Life and career ==
In 1952, Sharkovsky's name appeared in the mathematical world - the magazine "Russian Mathematical Surveys", when eighth-grader Oleksandr Sharkovsky became the winner of the Kyiv Mathematical Olympiad for schoolchildren. By his first year in Kyiv National University, he had already written his first scientific work. After graduating with honors from Taras Shevchenko National University of Kyiv he successfully completed postgraduate studies at the NASU Institute of Mathematics with an early defense of his candidate's thesis (1961). Soon thereafter, in 1967, he defended his doctoral thesis. In 1978, O. M. Sharkovsky was elected a corresponding member of the Academy of Sciences of the Ukrainian SSR. Since 1974, O. M. Sharkovsky headed the department of differential equations of the Institute of Mathematics of the Ukrainian SSR Academy of Sciences, and since 1986 he headed the department of the theory of dynamical systems, which was created on his initiative.

In 2006, Sharkovsky became a full member of the National Academy of Sciences of Ukraine. He was the head of the department of the Theory of dynamical systems at the Institute of Mathematics of the National Academy of Sciences of Ukraine. In the last years of his life, he worked as a chief researcher of the Department of Theory of Dynamic Systems and Fractal Analysis of the Institute of Mathematics of the National Academy of Sciences.

O.M. Sharkovsky died on 21 November 2022, at the age of 85 in the Feofaniya Clinical Hospital in Kyiv.

== Scientific work ==
Oleksandr Sharkovsky created the foundations of the topological theory of one-dimensional dynamic systems, a theory that today is one of the tools for researching evolutionary problems of the most diverse nature. He discovered the law of coexistence of periodic trajectories of different periods; the topological structure of basins of attraction of various sets is investigated; a number of criteria of simplicity and complexity of dynamic systems were obtained. O. M. Sharkovsky also contributed fundamental results in dynamical systems theory on arbitrary topological spaces.

The achievements of the Ukrainian scientist received general recognition in international scientific circles. The formation and development of chaotic dynamics are associated with his name. In the scientific literature, you can find such terms as Sharkovsky's theorem, Sharkovsky's ordering, Sharkovsky's space, Sharkovsky's stratification, etc.

Sharkovsky's theorem is associated with initiating a new direction in the theory of dynamical systems — combinatorial dynamics. In 1994, an international conference "Thirty years after Sharkovsky's theorem" was held in Spain.

Research conducted by O. M. Sharkovsky allowed him to propose the concept of "ideal turbulence" — a new mathematical phenomenon in deterministic systems that models the most complex properties of turbulence in time and space, namely: the processes of the formation of coherent structures of decreasing scales and the birth of random states.

O. M. Sharkovsky actively combines scientific work with pedagogical activity. From the mid-60s of the 20th century. gave general courses and lectures on the theory of dynamic systems at the mechanical and mathematical faculty of his native university. O. M. Sharkovsky is the author of almost 250 scientific works, including five monographs written in co-authorship with students. Among the students are 3 doctors and 14 candidates of sciences.

The Ukrainian scientist devoted a lot of energy and time to developing scientific relations. He gave lectures at universities and scientific centers in more than 20 countries in Europe and America, and at universities in China and Australia. He was a member of the editorial boards of a number of international mathematical publications, in particular, he was a co-editor of the journal Journal of Difference Equations and Applications.

His last paper "Descriptive theory of determined chaos" was published in the Ukrains’kyi Matematychnyi Zhurnal (Ukrainian Mathematical Journal) in January 2023 and translated in July 2023 with publication in Springer Link.

== Awards and prizes ==
- The first prize of the Kyiv Olympiad of Young Mathematicians (1951), the magazine "Russian Mathematical Surveys", (UMS, 7, 1952)
- The Bogoliubov Prize of National Academy of Sciences of Ukraine for the series of works "The theory of scattering of quantum systems and one-dimensional dynamical systems" (1993)
- The Lavrentyev Prize of National Academy of Sciences of Ukraine for a series of papers "Complex dynamic finite-dimensional and infinite-dimensional systems" (2005)
- State Prize of Ukraine in Science and Technology for the cycle of scientific works "Theory of dynamic systems: modern methods and their application" (2010)
- Bernd Aulbach Prize of the International Society of Difference Equations (2011)
- Honorary doctorate Doctor Honoris Causa (Dr. h. c.) from the Silesian University in Opava, Czech Republic (2014)
- The Mitropolskiy Prize of National Academy of Sciences of Ukraine, Kyiv (2019)
