= List of Ukrainian mathematicians =

This is a list of the best known Ukrainian mathematicians. This list includes some Polish, pre-revolutionary Russian and Soviet mathematicians who lived or worked in Ukraine.

== A ==
- Akhiezer, Naum Ilyich (1901–1980)

== B ==
- Bernstein, Sergei Natanovich (1880–1968)
- Borok, Valentina Mikhailovna (1931–2004)
- Berlyand, Leonid Viktorovich (b. 1957)

== D ==
- Drinfeld, Volodymyr Gershonovych (b. 1954)

== E ==
- Eremenko, Oleksandr Emmanuilovich (b. 1954)

== G ==
- Geronimus, Yakov Lazarevich (1898–1984)
- Glushkov, Victor Mihailovich (1923–1982)
- Goldberg, Anatolii Asirovich (1930–2008)
- Grave, Dmytro Olexandrovych (1863–1939)

== K ==
- Kadets, Mikhail Iosiphovich (1923–2011)
- Korolyuk, Volodymyr Semenovych (1925–2020)
- Kondratiev, Yuri (b. 1953)
- Koshmanenko, Volodymyr Dmytrovych (b. 1943)
- Kravchuk, Myhailo Pylypovych (1892–1942)
- Krein, Mark Grigorievich (1907–1989)
- Krylov, Mykola Mytrofanovych (1879–1955)

== M ==
- Marchenko, Volodymyr Olexandrovych (1922–2026)
- Mitropolskiy, Yurii Oleksiyovych (1917–2008)
- Maryna Viazovska (b. 1984)
- Melnykov, Volodymyr Mykolayovych (b. 1951)

== N ==
- Naimark, Mark Aronovich (1909–1978)

== P ==
- Pastur, Leonid Andriyovych (b. 1937)
- Pfeiffer, Georgii Yurii (1872–1946)
- Pogorelov, Aleksei Vasil'evich (1919–2002)

== S ==
- Shatunovsky, Samuil Osipovich (1859–1929)
- Samoilenko, Anatoliy Myhailovych (1938–2020)
- Skorokhod, Anatoliy Volodymyrovych (1930–2011)
- Shor, Naum Zuselevevich (1937–2006)
- Slyusar, Vadim Ivanovich (1964)

== T ==
- Turbin, Anatoliy Fedorovych (b. 1940)

== V ==
- Vaschenko-Zakharchenko, Myhailo Yegorovych (1825–1912)
- Voronyi, Georgiy Feodosiyovych (1868–1908)

== Y ==
- Yadrenko Myhailo Yosypovych (1932–2004)

== Mathematicians born in Ukraine ==
- Arnold, Vladimir Igorevich (b. 1937, Odesa, d. 2010, Paris)
- Besicovitch, Abram Samoilovitch (b. 1891, Berdyansk, d. 1970, Cambridge, UK)
- Fichtenholz, Grigorii Mikhailovich (b. 1888, Odesa, d. 1959, Leningrad)
- Fomenko Anatoliy Timofeevich (b. 1945, Donetsk)
- Gelfand, Israel Moiseevich (b. 1913, Okny, Kherson region, d. 2009, New Brunswick, NJ)
- Shafarevich, Igor Rostislavovich (b. 1923, Zhytomyr, d. 2017, Moscow)
- Urysohn, Pavlo Samuilovich (b. 1898, Odesa, d. 1924, Batz-sur-Mer, France)

== See also ==
- Kharkiv Mathematical School
- List of amateur mathematicians
- List of mathematicians
- List of Indian mathematicians
- List of Slovenian mathematicians
- Lwów School of Mathematics
