= Yuri Trubnikov =

Belarusian mathematician (1946–2025)

Yuri Valentinovich Trubnikov
- Born: March 18, 1946; Tashkent, Uzbek SSR, Soviet Union
- Died: April 27, 2025 (aged 79); Vitebsk, Belarus
- Education: Voronezh State University
- Known for: Functional analysis, nonsmooth analysis, approximation theory, differential equations
- Awards: Badge of distinction «За адзнаку» of Vitebsk State University (2021); Honorary Certificate of the Ministry of Education of Belarus (2021)
- Scientific career
- Fields: Mathematics
- Workplaces: Vitebsk State University named after P. M. Masherov; Vitebsk State Technological University; Voronezh State University
- Thesis: Extremal Constructions in Nonsmooth Analysis and Operator Equations with Accretive Nonlinearities (2004)
- Academic advisors: A. I. Perov
- Doctoral students: A. M. Voronov; Sun Baiyu

Yuri Valentinovich Trubnikov (Russian: Юрий Валентинович Трубников; 18 March 1946 – 27 April 2025) was a Belarusian mathematician, Doctor of Physical and Mathematical Sciences, and professor, specialising in functional analysis and function theory. He was known for his contributions to nonsmooth analysis, operator equations with accretive nonlinearities, approximation theory, and differential equations. For more than two decades he worked at Vitebsk State University named after P. M. Masherov (VSU), where he founded and headed the scientific school of nonlinear functional analysis. He authored more than 300 scientific, methodological, and review publications, including four monographs.

== Biography ==
=== Early life and education ===
Yuri Trubnikov was born on 18 March 1946 in Tashkent, Uzbek SSR. While at school he attended a mathematical circle at Tashkent State University. He then entered the Faculty of Mathematics and Mechanics of Voronezh State University, from which he graduated in 1969 with a degree in mathematics. He remained at the university, working under Professor A. I. Perov at the department that later became the Department of Nonlinear Oscillations.

In January 1973 he entered the graduate school of Voronezh State University at the Department of Nonlinear Oscillations, and in 1974 he defended his candidate dissertation Monotone Differential Equations (specialty 01.01.02 — differential and integral equations). Its main results were published in the series of joint papers with Perov, "Monotone differential equations" I–IV, in the journal Differential Equations (1974–1978). After the defence he became a reviewer for Mathematical Reviews and a member of the American Mathematical Society.

=== Vitebsk Technological Institute ===
In 1980 Trubnikov moved to Belarus and joined the Department of Higher Mathematics of the Vitebsk Technological Institute of Light Industry (now Vitebsk State Technological University). He received the academic title of associate professor (docent) in 1982. From 1986 to 1998 he headed the department, and from 1998 to 2001 he was an associate professor at the Department of Theoretical and Applied Mathematics of the same university.

=== Vitebsk State University ===
In 2000 the rector of Vitebsk State University named after P. M. Masherov, A. V. Rusetsky, invited Yuri to the university, where from 2001 he was a professor at the Department of Theoretical and Mathematical Physics. On 26 March 2004 he defended his doctoral dissertation, Extremal Constructions in Nonsmooth Analysis and Operator Equations with Accretive Nonlinearities (specialty 01.01.01), at Belarusian State University; the degree of Doctor of Physical and Mathematical Sciences was confirmed on 13 October 2004.

At VSU, Yuri served as dean of the Faculty of Physics (2004–2006), professor at the Department of General and Theoretical Physics (2006–2008), and head of the Department of Theoretical Physics (2008–2014). In 2012 he received the academic title of professor. From 2015 to 2022 he was a professor at the Department of Geometry and Mathematical Analysis of the Faculty of Mathematics and Information Technologies, and from 2022 a professor at the Department of Engineering Physics, where he worked until his death.

Yuri Trubnikov died on 27 April 2025 in Vitebsk, at the age of 79.

== Scientific work ==
Trubnikov's research interests included functional analysis, approximation theory, complex dynamical systems, and differential equations. He authored more than 300 scientific, methodological, and review works, as well as four monographs written with co-authors. His best-known book, Differential Equations with Monotone Nonlinearities (with A. I. Perov, Minsk, 1986), grew out of his work on monotone and accretive operator equations. His publications are indexed in zbMATH Open and Mathematical Reviews, mainly in ordinary differential equations, operator theory, numerical analysis, and complex function theory.

For about fifteen years Trubnikov led research tasks under the State Program of Scientific Research of Belarus. He was the founder and head of the scientific-pedagogical school "Nonlinear Functional Analysis" at VSU. Two candidate dissertations were defended under his supervision at Belarusian State University, by Andrei M. Voronov (2011) and by Sun Baiyu (China, 2015); a third, by Mikhail M. Chernyavsky, was announced by Vitebsk State University in June 2022.

From 1975 onward he reviewed for Mathematical Reviews, and he was a long-time member of the American Mathematical Society. He remained scientifically active until the end of his life: his last papers, written with A. V. Lebedev and M. M. Chernyavsky, appeared in Mathematical Notes in 2024 and, posthumously, in 2026.

== Teaching and administration ==
Trubnikov worked in higher education for more than fifty years, first in Voronezh and later in Vitebsk. At the Vitebsk Technological Institute he headed the Department of Higher Mathematics for twelve years. At VSU he lectured on mathematical analysis, differential equations, functional analysis, and related courses, and continued teaching past his 70th birthday. Colleagues noted his depth of knowledge and a clear, accessible style of teaching; he described himself as not overly strict but always striving to be objective in assessment.

== Awards and recognition ==
- Badge of distinction «За адзнаку» ("For Distinction") of Vitebsk State University named after P. M. Masherov — the university's decoration, registered in the State Heraldic Register of Belarus — presented at the ceremonial session of the University Council marking the university's 110th anniversary (2021).
- Honorary Certificate of the Ministry of Education of the Republic of Belarus, for many years of fruitful work in the education system and the training of highly qualified specialists (2021).
- Included in the biographical directory Who Is Who in the Republic of Belarus.
- Member of the American Mathematical Society; reviewer for Mathematical Reviews for several decades.

== Personal life ==
A jubilee profile in the university newspaper My i chas described Trubnikov as "a mathematician with the soul of a lyric poet": he was fond of literature and wrote poetry. His wife was also a mathematician; they had a son, Igor, who earned a candidate degree in physical and mathematical sciences and works in information technology, and a daughter, Anastasia. He also had a daughter, Yulia, from his brief first marriage. He had six grandchildren.

== Selected works ==
- Трубников, Ю. В. (2002). Экстремальные конструкции в негладком анализе и операторные уравнения с аккретивными нелинейностями [Extremal Constructions in Nonsmooth Analysis and Operator Equations with Accretive Nonlinearities] (in Russian). Moscow: Астропресс. p. 256. ISBN 5-289-02022-5. LCCN 2002486131.
- Трубников, Ю. В.; Перов, А. И. (1986). Дифференциальные уравнения с монотонными нелинейностями [Differential Equations with Monotone Nonlinearities] (in Russian). Minsk: Наука и техника. Zbl 0623.34002.
- Трубников, Ю. В.; Перов, А. И. (1974). "Монотонные дифференциальные уравнения. I" [Monotone differential equations. I]. Дифференциальные уравнения (in Russian). 10 (5): 804–815. MR 0350143. Zbl 0293.34093.
- Trubnikov, Yu. V. (1979). "Accretive differential equations". Siberian Mathematical Journal. 20 (4): 586–600. doi:10.1007/BF00970374. MR 0546272. Zbl 0416.34012.
- Trubnikov, Yu. V. (1987). "The Hanner inequality and the convergence of iterative processes". Soviet Mathematics (Izvestiya VUZ. Matematika). 31 (7): 74–83. MR 0912618. Zbl 0644.47035.
- Трубников, Ю. В.; Подоксенов, М. Н.; Чернявский, М. М. (2020). Методология математических исследований [Methodology of Mathematical Research] (in Russian). Vitebsk: ВГУ имени П. М. Машерова.
- Lebedev, A. V.; Trubnikov, Yu. V.; Chernyavsky, M. M. (2024). "On the Hadamard and Vandermonde Determinants and the Bernoulli–Euler–Lagrange–Aitken Method for Calculating the Roots of Polynomials". Mathematical Notes. 116 (1–2): 77–92. doi:10.1134/S0001434624070071.
