= Sharafbonu Pulodova =

Sharafbonu Pulodova (born 2 January 1933) is a Tajikistani philologist, Indologist, and Orientalist.

Born into a scholarly family in Khujand, Pulodova received her early education in schools in Tajikistan before graduating from the Khujand Pedagogical School in 1955, taking a degree in philology. She remained at the same school as an instructor in the Department of Languages and Literature; from 1955 until 1956 she was a lecturer, and from 1956 until 1958 she was a teacher. In the latter year she matriculated at the Institute of Oriental Studies at the USSR Academy of Science, where she remained until 1962, working in the division of philology. She defended her thesis, The Importance of the Works of Mirza Ghalib in the Formation of Contemporary Urdu Prose, in 1963. Pulodova began working at the Orientalist Institute of the Tajikistan Academy of Sciences in 1961, continuing her association with the organization first as a Junior, and later Senior, Scientific Worker. Her field of interest was relations between India and Pakistan. In 1993 she left to join the World Economy Research Center, dealing with the academy's international relations; she was in this post until 2000, when she moved to the newly formed Institute of Oriental and Written Heritage at the same body. Among her writings are Mirza Ghalib's Urdu Letters (1966); In Friendship's Path (1991); and Collected Persian Poems of Muhammad Iqbal (1997).
