= Oleksandr Boichuk =

Ukrainian mathematician (1950–2024)

- Олександр Бойчук
- Born: 30 June 1950; Kirovohrad, Ukrainian SSR, USSR
- Died: 20 June 2024 (aged 73)
- Education: Taras Shevchenko National University of Kyiv
- Known for: Significant contribution to theory of boundary value problems with normally solvable operators in the linear part
- Scientific career
- Fields: Mathematics
- Workplaces: Institute of Mathematics NAS of Ukraine; Taras Shevchenko National University of Kyiv

Oleksandr Andriiovych Boichuk, sometimes Alexander Boichuk (Ukrainian: Олекса́ндр Андрі́йович Бойчу́к; 30 June 1950 – 20 June 2024) was a Ukrainian mathematician, doctor of physical and mathematical sciences, professor, corresponding member of the National Academy of Sciences of Ukraine (since 2012), head of the laboratory boundary-value problems of differential equations of the Institute of Mathematics of the National Academy of Sciences of Ukraine, was awarded the State Prize of Ukraine in Science and Technology and Mitropolskiy Prize (2013).

Boichuk was an expert on the theory of the boundary value problems with the normally solvable operators in the linear part. For the first time defined the conditions for the solvability and spent the classification of the resonant cases a wide class of nonlinear boundary value problems for systems of ordinary differential and difference equations, delay equations, equations with impulsive and singularly perturbed equations for which the proposed use of the apparatus of generalized inverse operators.

Boichuk was the author of over 110 scientific papers including three monographs. Under his guidance were prepared 2 doctors of sciences and 13 candidates of sciences.

Boichuk died on 20 June 2024, at the age of 73.

== Books ==
- "Generalized Inverse Operators and Fredholm Boundary Value Problems" VSP. Utrecht-Boston. 2004. 317 p.( with Samoilenko A.M.)
- Constructive methods of analysis of the boundary value problems. – Kyiv, ”Naukova dumka”. – 1990. – 96 pp. ( in Russian, English summary).
- Generalized inverse operators and Noether boundary-value problems, – Kyiv, Inst. Math. Nat. Acad. Sci. Ukraine. – 1995. – 320 pp. ( in Russian, with Zhuravlev V.F, Samoilenko A.M.)
