= Ludmila Christeseva =

Swedish-Belarusian visual artist

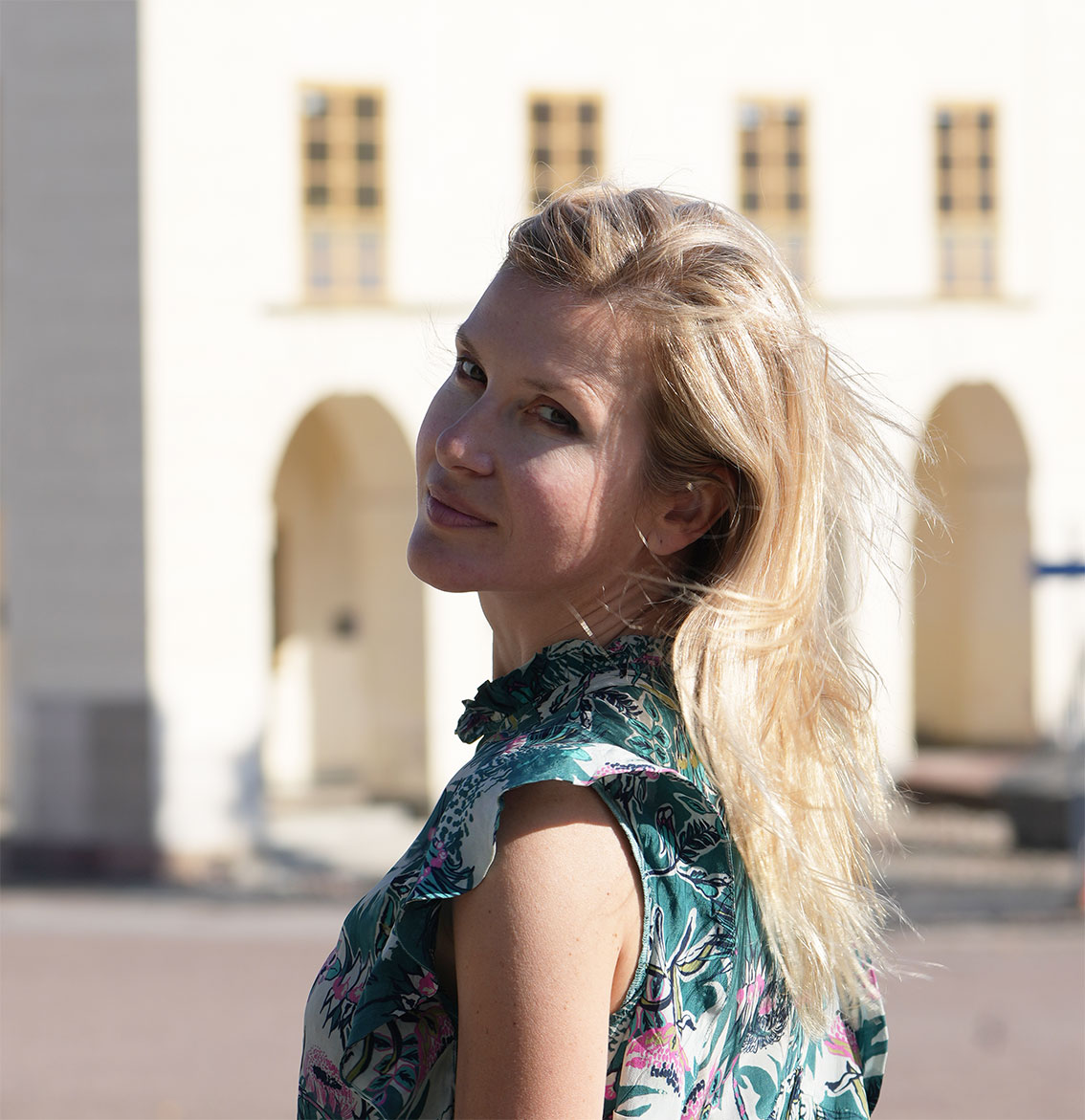
- Christeseva in 2023
- Born: 3 March 1978 (age 48); Mahiljoŭ, Byelorussian SSR, Soviet Union
- Education: Vitebsk State Technological University (MA in Fashion and Textile Design; 2000); Stockholm University (MA in Fashion Studies; 2013)
- Style: Installation art, protest art, social justice art, textile arts
- Website: chritseseva.com

Ludmila Christeseva (alias L. Christeseva, Belarusian: Людміла Хрысцесева), is a Belarusian-born Swedish visual artist focused primarily on installation art exploring themes related to feminism, protest, social justice, and war.

== Early life and education ==
She was born in 1978 in Mogilev, Belarus. Christeseva said in 2024 of her childhood, "growing up in Belarus, I lacked support from my mother and sister, with our relationships shaped by rivalry and misunderstanding".

She received a Master's of Arts degree from The Faculty of Artistic Design and Technology at the Vitebsk State Technological University in Belarus in 2001. Christeseva then moved to Sweden and joined the creative team of the Swedish fashion designer Lars Wallin.

Christeseva holds a Master’s degree from Stockholm University, where her thesis was titled Pussy Riot: Democracy in Russia Through the Lens of the Brightly Coloured Balaclava. She also studied at the University College of Arts, Crafts and Design (Konstfack).

== Career ==
Her artistic research focuses on gender identity and questions of representation across cultures. She has participated in art projects and exhibitions in Sweden and abroad. She runs Artten, an exhibition space in central Stockholm dedicated to women’s empowerment.

=== Exhibitions ===
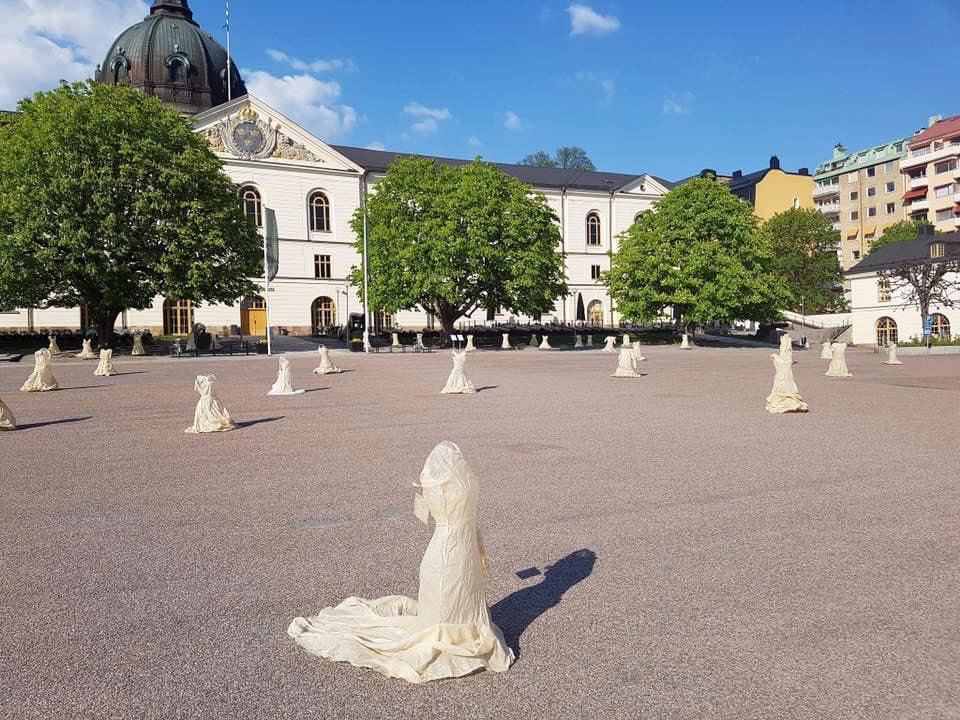
Exhibition «War´s Unwomanly Face», Stockholm, Swedish Army Museum (2016)

Christeseva's institutional exhibitions include “War´s Unwomanly Face” exhibited at the Swedish Army Museum in Stockholm (2016) and in the US Ambassador to Sweden's residence in Stockholm (2016); “The Toiles” at the Stockholm Costume & Fashion institute (2017) and at the Nordic Museum in Stockholm (2017-2018). A series of sculptures by Christeseva became a unique scenography for the performance of Margaret Jenkins Dance Company (USA) in Stockholm in 2016.

In June 2015, Christeseva presented the exhibition Sustainidenity, which "emphasises the idea of becoming rather than being or even being born a woman," at the Swedish Embassy in Kazakhstan. The exhibition was later reprised at the Belarusian National History Museum in 2016.

Christeseva is an art director and was the executive producer for the international exhibition “Ingmar Bergman and his Legacy in Fashion and Art”, which was shown in more than 60 countries around the world in 2018. On July 14, 2018, L. Christeseva was invited to show her installation with “The Toiles" in the context of the harsh and unique nature of Fårö as part of the worldwide celebration of Ingmar Bergman's 100-year jubilee at the Bergmancenter.

Since 2018, Christeseva has been an invited artist to Artdom, an international female art movement started by Arghavan Agida.

In 2019, inspired by a century of women’s suffrage and a legacy of pride, purpose, and momentum, Christeseva brought the Belarusian eco-brand Historia Naturalis to the streets of Stockholm with a fashion show. Notable participants included Christina Johannesson, the Swedish ambassador to Belarus, and Maria Rashidi, founder of Women’s Rights / Kvinnors Rätt.

In 2019, Christeseva worked on a project at Ege University in Turkey, which encouraged students to create feminist art.

=== Crafts that unite, heal, and last ===
Following the onset of the Russian invasion of Ukraine, Christeseva initiated "Crafts that unite, heal, and last", a global textile movement for peace and freedom. The public presentations have taken places globally: in Turkey with support from the Swedish Institute; in the United States within the ESKFF artists in residency program located at Mana Contemporary, at Times Square by invitation of a NGO Razom for Ukraine, in Sweden’s Royal Armoury museum located at the Royal Palace, and at Oslo Freedom Forum organized by Human Rights Foundation (HRF) with Garry Kasparov as a chairman at that time. Christeseva’s activist practice has been documented in the film "Weaving" by director Hsuan Pan Yu (Taiwan/USA), as well as in the performance festival In an Act of Weaving, directed by curator Nefeli Oikonomou (Greece/Sweden).

=== Artten Foundation ===
In 2023, Christeseva founded the Artten Foundation to empower women and children globally through culture and education.

One of the initiatives, Yellow & Blue: All of Sweden Weaves (Swedish: Gul&Blå: hela Sverige flätar), has brought together more than 8,000 participants to weave the Swedish flag from textile strips bearing messages of peace. The artwork marks 100 year anniversary of Stockholm City Hall, which was celebrated in 2023. The production of the artwork and its public presentations have taken place in different Swedish cities including Stockholm, Visby, and Gothenburg and important political events including Järva week (Swedish: Järvaveckan) and Almedalen Week.

Since 2025, Christeseva has focused on Roses of Ties, initiated by Ukrainian women who transformed their partners’ and sons’ ties into rose brooches worn close to the heart.

== Belarusian opposition ==
Christeseva worked on the animated documentary My Apple Tree Behind Bars, which explores "the experiences of Belarusians living in exile and..the injustices of the Lukashenko regime". Another of her projects, "The Best Apple Pie Recipes from Political Prisoners", works to compile "recipes and stories from Belarusian political prisoners".

On May 25–26, 2025, Ludmila Christeseva was invited to participate in the Women’s Political Leadership Academy as part of the democratic movement led by Sviatlana Tsikhanouskaya in Warsaw.

== Awards and recognition ==
Ludmila Christeseva won Impact of the Year by IHM Impact Awards and has been nominated for Nelson Mandela Prize 2023, 2024, and 2025 by Stockholm Municipality. In 2024 and 2025, she was also nominated for the Tällberg-SNF-Eliasson Global Leadership Prize.

In 2024, She participated in the Swedish Institute’s Leadership Program and presented, at the program’s final event, a collaborative project with Belarusian artist Liliya Busarava titled My Apple Tree Behind Bars.

== Personal life ==
Christeseva has children with a former partner, who is Russian.
