= List of universities in Tajikistan =

This is a list of universities in Tajikistan.

- Agricultural University of Tajikistan, named after Shirinsho Shotemur
- Academy of Public Administration under the President of the Republic of Tajikistan
- Khorugh State University, named after M. Nazarshoyev
- Khujand State University, named after academician Bobojon Ghafurov
- Kulob State University
- Liberty University of Tajikistan
- Lomonosov Moscow State University branch
- Pädagogische Universität Tadschikistan
- Qurghonteppa State University, named after Nasir Khusraw
- Russian-Tajik Slavonic University
- Tajik Energy Institute
- Tajik State Medical University, named after Avicenna (aka Ibn Sina)
- Tajik State National University
- Tajik State Pedagogical University, named after Jurayev
- Tajik State University of Commerce
- Tajik Technical University, named after Muhammad Osimi
- Tajik University of Law, Business and Politics
- Tajikistan Humanitarian International University
- Tajikistan-Russian Modern University
- Tajikistan State University of Law, Business, & Politics
- Technological University of Tajikistan
- University of Central Asia, Khorog, GBAO
- University of Khajuraho
