= Valeriy Shevchuk =

Ukrainian writer (1939–2025)

Shevchenko National Prize laureate Valeriy Shevchuk
- Валерій Шевчук
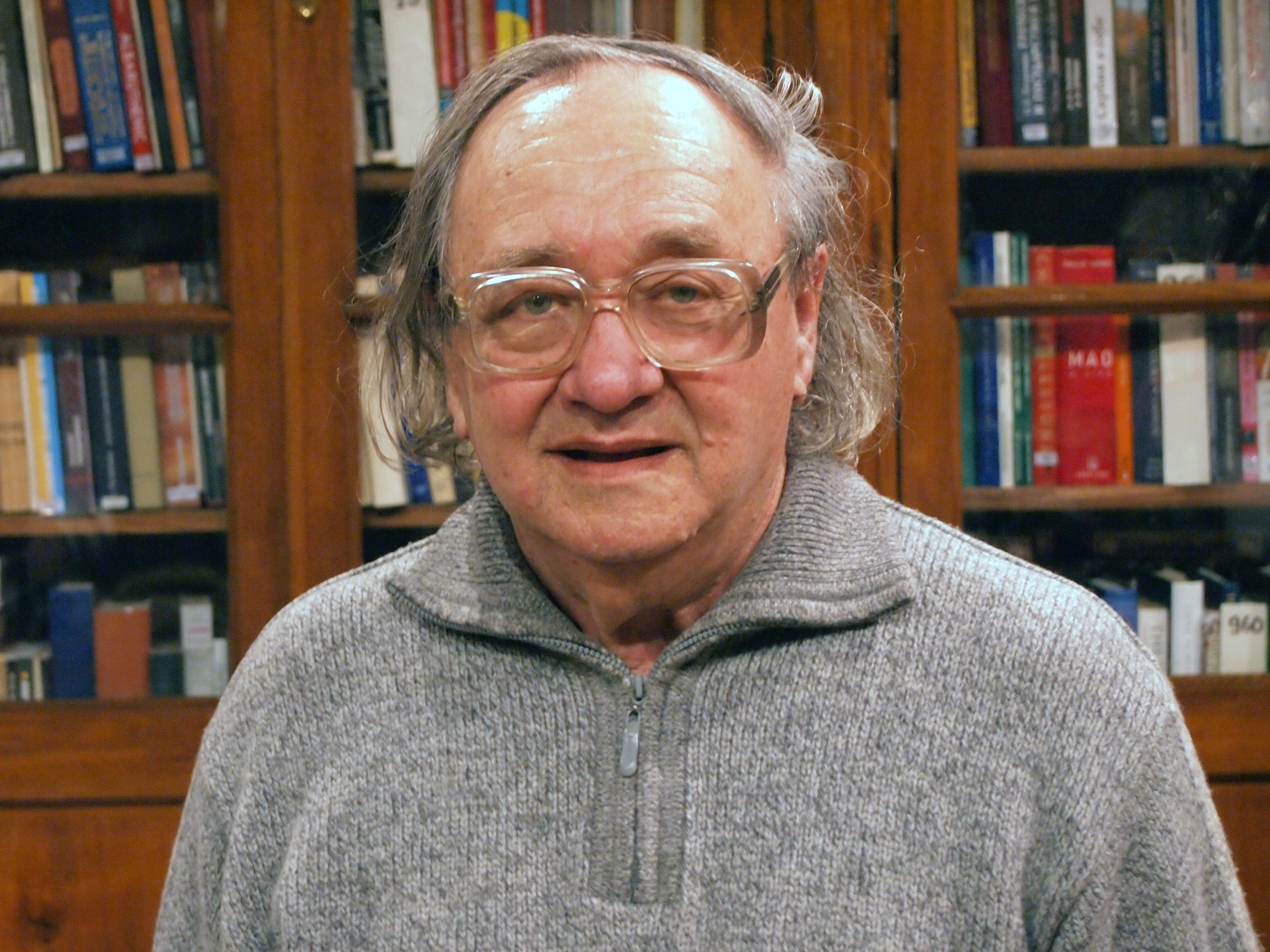
- Shevchuk in 2011
- Born: 20 August 1939; Zhytomyr, Ukrainian SSR, Soviet Union
- Died: 6 May 2025 (aged 85); Kyiv, Ukraine
- Occupations: Writer; translator; literary scholar; historian
- Writing career
- Language: Ukrainian
- Period: 1967–2025
- Genres: Novel; short story; drama; essay
- Literary movement: Historical fiction; psychological fiction; gothic fiction; historical study; literary study

Valeriy Oleksandrovych Shevchuk (Ukrainian: Валерій Олександрович Шевчук; 20 August 1939 – 6 May 2025) was a Ukrainian writer.

== Early life ==
Shevchuk was born on 20 August 1939 to a family of a shoemaker and a Polish woman by origin. In 1956, wanting to become a geologist, he applied to the Lviv Institute of Forestry but failed the entrance exam. Instead, he went to a technical school, Zhytomyr Technical School №1, and worked at a concrete plant. While attending the technical school, he recalled discovering more about himself by reading Ukrainian literature by Ivan Franko and Dmytro Bahalii, which led him away from geology and toward philology. He then entered the University of Kyiv within the school's Faculty of History and Philosophy with a major in philology. After graduating, he started working in a newspaper called Young Guard as a correspondent. He then served his mandatory service in the Soviet Armed Forces in Murmansk Oblast within the Russian SFSR. He was sent to faraway Murmansk for his army term because of his writing in the press of Kyiv, which was not favorable to the government. Shevchuk got a job within the scientific department of the Kyiv Historical Museum in 1965 after returning home from the army. However, just a year later, Valeriy was arrested at the "Ukraina cinema" in Kyiv during a screening of Shadows of Forgotten Ancestors alongside a group of Kyiv intellectuals who were protesting the new arrests following the Khrushchev thaw. Due to this and his older brother, Anatoliy, being imprisoned in Mordovia, Shevchuk was let go from the museum.

== Career ==
Shevchuk published his first work, a story about Taras Shevchenko titled "Nastunka", in 1961. In 1967, he published his second big work, a collection of stories entitled Sered Tyzhnya (In the Middle of the Week), and he also joined the National Writers' Union of Ukraine (NSPU) during this time. He would follow this up with Naberezhna, 12 and Seredokhrestya, and then finally Vechir Svyatoyi Oseni in 1969. After the publication of the latter, he stopped publishing for ten years due to repression from Soviet authorities. During this time, he became interested in manuscripts of ancient Ukrainian, especially from the Baroque era. He was finally allowed to return in 1979, and published his first book in ten years, Kryk Pivnya na Svitanku. Afterwards, he went on a spree of publishing his works for the next decade. He also did historical work when publishing, and prepared for print the Samiilo Velychko Chronicle, works about Petro Mohyla, and made five anthologies of ancient Ukrainian poetry.

== Personal life and death ==
Shevchuk died on 6 May 2025, at the age of 85 at Feofaniya Clinical Hospital in Kyiv. He died following a serious illness a year after it became known he was suffering with diabetes mellitus.

== Awards ==
- Shevchenko National Prize (Ukraine, 1988)
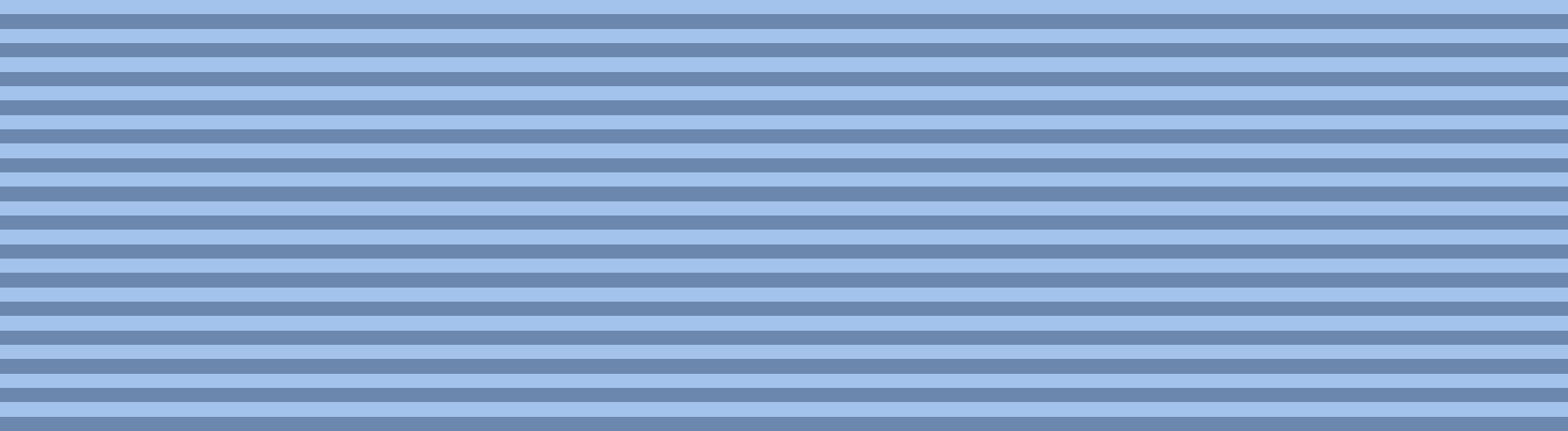
- Order of Prince Yaroslav the Wise in 5th class (Ukraine, 1999)
- 25 Years of Independence of Ukraine Medal (Ukraine, 2016)

Valeriy Shevchuk was an Honoured Professor of the Kyiv-Mohyla Academy and of the National University of Lviv. He was a laureate of the Antonovych Foundation Award and of other numerous literary awards. He is also an honored figure of Polish Culture. His works have been translated into 22 languages.

In 2011, Valeriy Shevchuk Prize was instituted by the Ivan Franko Zhytomyr State University.

== Notable works ==
- “In the Midweek” (1967)
- “The Esplanade 12” (1968)
- “The Scream of the Rooster at Dawn” (1979)
- “On a Humble Field” (1983)
- “A House on a Mountain” (1983)
- “Three Leaves Behind the Window” (1986),
- “The Thinking Tree” (1986)
- “Birds from an Invisible Island” (1989)
- “The Murrain” (1989)
- “An Eternal Clock” (1990)
- “The Woman of Flowers” (1990 – the collection of fairy tales)
- “The path in the Grass. The Zhytomyr Saga” (two-volume, 1994)
- “Inside the Belly of an Apocalyptic Beast” (1995)
- “Eye of the Abyss” (1996)
- “The Snakewoman” (1998)
- “Silver Milk” (2002)
- “The Vanishing Shadows. A Family Chronicle.” (2002)
- “The Cossack State: Studies to the History of Establishment of the Ukrainian State” (1995)
- “The Roxelany Muse: the Ukrainian Literature of 16th to 18th Centuries in 2 Volumes” (2005)
- “The Known and the Unknown Sphinx. Hryhorii Skovoroda in the Modern View” (2008)

He compiled several collections of love poetry of the 16th to 19th centuries and translated them into modern literary language, such as "Songs of Cupid" (1984) and heroic poetry of the 9th and 10th centuries “Field of Mars” in 2 volumes (1989), “The Chronicle of Samiylo Velychko” (two-volume, 1991), etc.

=== Publications in English ===
The Meek Shall Inherit... (trans. of Na poli smyrennomu). Trans. by Viktoriia Kholmohorova. Kyiv: Dnipro Publishers, 1989.
