= Zoya Tajikova =

Tajik musicologist

- Таджикова Зоя Михайловна
- Born: 14 September 1935; Dushanbe
- Alma mater: State Conservatory of Uzbekistan
- Occupation: Musicologist
- Employer: Tajik Academy of Sciences

Zoya Mikhailovna Tajikova (born 14 September 1935) is a Tajik musicologist.

Zoya Tajikova was born on 14 September 1935 in Dushanbe, then part of the Soviet Union. She graduated from the Tashkent Conservatory in 1959 and was elected a member of the Composers of the Union of Soviet Socialist Republics in 1963. She earned a PhD in 1977; her dissertation was “The Vocal Culture of Tajiks”. She was a research fellow at the Tajik Academy of Sciences from 1980 to 1996.

Her research focuses on traditional music of Tajikistan, especially folk songs from the Zaravshon River region and Bukharan Jews.

Because of the Tajikistani Civil War, she emigrated to the United States in 1996.
