= Malohat Shahobova =

Tajikstani linguist

- Малоҳат Шаҳобова
- Born: 15 March 1928; Bukhara
- Died: 30 September 2003 (aged 75)
- Occupation: Linguist

Malohat Badriddinovna Shahobova (Tajik: Малоҳат Бадриддиновна Шаҳобова) (15 March 1928 – 30 September 2003) was a Tajikistani linguist.

== Early life ==
Shahobova was born in Bukhara on March 15, 1928. She took a degree in English, graduating from the Institute of Foreign Languages in 1948. Three years later, she graduated from Dushanbe Pedagogical Institute. In 1959, she graduated from the Institute of Foreign Languages in Moscow.

== Career ==
Becoming an academic, she then began teaching at both the Institute of Foreign Languages and the Dushanbe Pedagogical Institute. She became a member of the Communist Party of the Soviet Union in 1952. She received a doctorate in 1985, and achieved the rank of professor two years later. Shahobova's work focused on the relationships between Tajik and English. Her publications include The English Language (1982); Experimental Comparative Study of Tajiki and English Grammars (Moscow, 1985); An English-Tajik Dictionary (1987); and Tajik-Russian Conversation (1993). She also produced a study of the work of Indian writers.

== Later life and legacy ==
Even in retirement, she remained active at the Tajikistan Academy of Sciences, in whose Department of Foreign Languages she continued to work. She was also the founder of the Women's Association of Tajikistan, and led the organization for many years. For her work, she was awarded the Honorary Order of the Presidium of the Supreme Soviet of Tajikistan.
