= Muhiba Yakubova =

Tajikistani biologist

- Born: January 22, 1937; Bukhara, Uzbek SSR, Soviet Union
- Education: Tajik National University
- Scientific career
- Fields: Biology
- Workplaces: Tajik Academy of Sciences

Muhiba Muhsinovna Yakubova (Tajik: Мухиба Мухсиновна Якубова) (born January 22, 1937) is a Tajikistani biologist.

A native of Bukhara, Yakubova graduated from Tajikistan State University in 1959. From 1961 until 1968 she was a Scientific Worker in the Physiology and Biology of Plants Institute of the Tajikistan Academy of Sciences; during this time, in 1967, she joined the Communist Party of the Soviet Union. From 1968 to 1973 she was an assistant professor in the Department of Plant Physiology, and in 1974 she became head of the Department of Biochemistry at Tajikistan State University. She received a doctorate in biology in 1984, becoming a professor two years later. Her preferred area of research is the interaction of biochemical agents, and involves the study of photosynthesis. Yakubova was named a Distinguished Educator of Tajikistan in 1976. During her career she has also served as president of the Association of Women of Science of Tajikistan and as chief editor of the Journal of the Academy of Sciences of the Republic of Tajikistan. She has received numerous awards, both from Tajikistan and from other nations, during her career, and has worked to advance the position of women in Tajikistan's scientific community. In 2007 she was elected an Academician of the Tajikistan Academy of Sciences.
