= Mariupol (disambiguation) =

Mariupol is a city in the eponymous raion on the Sea of Azov in Donetsk Oblast, Ukraine.

Mariupol may also refer to:

== Places ==
- Mariupol Raion, Donetsk Oblast, Donbas, Ukraine
- Port of Mariupol, Mariupol, Mariupol Raion, Donetsk Oblast, Ukraine
- Mariupol International Airport, Mariupol, Mariupol Raion, Donetsk Oblast, Ukraine
- Mariupol regional intensive care hospital, Mariupol, Mariupol Raion, Donetsk Oblast, Ukraine

== Mariupol and war ==
- Battle of Mariupol (1919), between Soviet Ukraine and White Russia
- Battle of Mariupol (2014), between Ukraine and Russian-backed separatists
- Offensive on Mariupol (September 2014), fight between Ukraine and Russian-backed separatists
- Siege of Mariupol (2022), siege and attacks by Russia
  - 9 March 2022 Mariupol Hospital 3 attack
  - Mariupol theatre airstrike
  - 20 Days in Mariupol, Academy Award-winning 2023 documentary about the siege

=== See also ===
- January 2015 Mariupol rocket attack, artillery barrage by Russian-backed separatists

== Mariupol and language ==
- Mariupol Greek, a dialect of the Greek language spoken on the north shore of the Sea of Azov

== Mariupol and higher education ==
- Mariupol State University

== Mariupol and business ==
- Mariupol Investment Group

== Sports ==
- FC Mariupol, Mariupol, Donetsk, Ukraine; a soccer team
- MBK Mariupol, Mariupol, Donetsk, Ukraine; a basketball team

== Prehistory of Mariupol ==
- Mariupol culture, a prehistoric civilization in the Mariupol region
