= Iryna Sushko =

Ukrainian mathematician

Iryna Sushko (born 1967) is a Ukrainian mathematician who works as a senior research fellow in the Institute of Mathematics of the National Academy of Sciences of Ukraine and as a visiting professor at the Kyiv School of Economics. Her research concerns nonlinear dynamical systems and their applications in economics and radio engineering.

== Education and career ==
Sushko was born in 1967, near Kyiv. She earned a master's degree in cybernetics from the Taras Shevchenko National University of Kyiv in 1989. After postgraduate study at the National Academy of Sciences of Ukraine, she earned a candidate (PhD) degree in physics and mathematics in 1993, supervised by Oleksandr Mykolayovych Sharkovsky. She became a research fellow at the National Academy of Sciences in 1993 and was promoted to senior research fellow in 2002.

In 2004–2005 she visited the University of Urbino as a Marie Curie Fellow of the European Community. Since 2009 to 2020 she has also held a position as a visiting professor at the Kyiv School of Economics.

== Books ==
Sushko is the co-author of Continuous and Discontinuous Piecewise-Smooth One-Dimensional Maps: Invariant Sets and Bifurcation Structures (with Viktor Avrutin, Laura Gardini, and Fabio Tramontana, World Scientific, 2019)

She is also a co-editor of several edited volumes, including Oligopoly and Complex Dynamics: Models and Tools (Springer, 2002), Business Cycle Dynamics: Models and Tools (Springer, 2006), and Global Analysis of Dynamic Models for Economics, Finance and Social Sciences (Springer, 2013).
