= Mamadsho Ilolov =

Tajik mathematician and politician

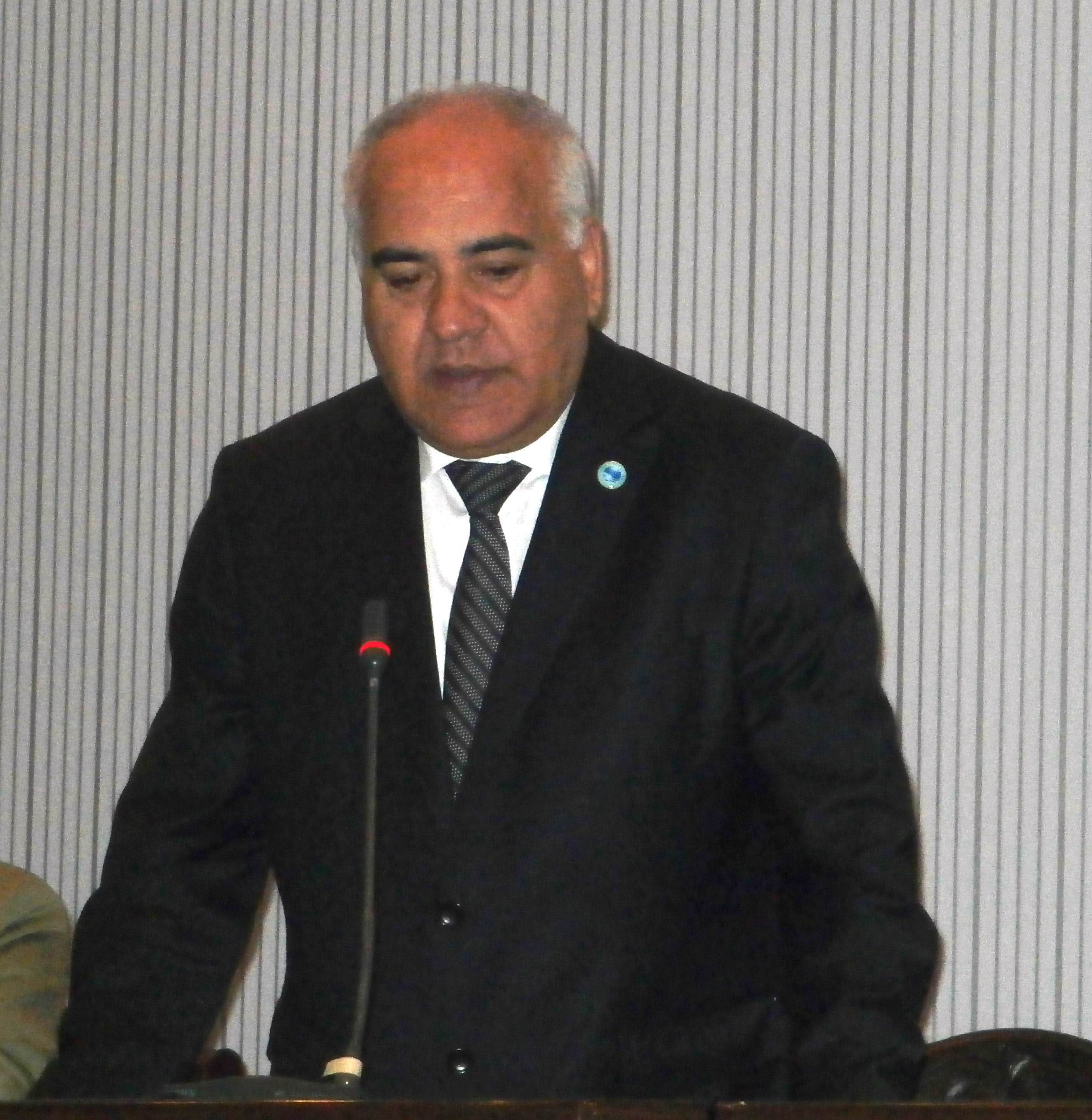
Mamadsho Ilolov

Mamadsho Ilolovich Ilolov (Tajik: Мамадшо Илолович Илолов) is President of the Tajik Academy of Sciences, a former member of the Tajikistan Parliament and former Minister of Labor and Social Protection of Population of the Republic of Tajikistan, and former rector of Khorugh State University.

Ilolov was born on March 14, 1948, in GBAO, Republic of Tajikistan. Academician Mamadsho Ilolov has awarded the Degrees of PhD, Grand PhD and Certificate of Full Professor from the World Information Distributed University, a known diploma mill, in 2007. He is currently a President of Academy of Sciences of the Republic of Tajikistan.

In January 2008, Ilolov held a press conference in Dushanbe to announce the creation of a new nanotechnology branch of the Tajik Academy of Science.

== Research fields ==
Differential Equations, Optimal Control Theory, History of Mathematics;

== Education ==
- Doctor of Physical and Mathematical Sciences (Grand PhD) of Mathematics, Kyiv 1992,
- PhD on Mathematics, Institute of Mathematics, Kiev, 1980,
- Diploma, Voronezh State University, Voronezh 1970;

== Awards ==
- Medal "Pushkin", awarded by the President of Russian Federation, 2007,
- 1st Degree order "Sharaf", awarded by the President of the Republic of Tajikistan, 2004

== Memberships ==
- Academician of the Academy of Sciences of Tajikistan, 2005,
- Foreign Member of the Academy of Sciences of Kazakhstan, 2005,
- Corresponding Member of the Academy of Sciences of the Republic of Tajikistan, 1997,
- Member of the American Mathematical Society, 1980;

== Professional experience ==
- Academy of Sciences of the Republic of Tajikistan, President, 2005–present;
- Ministry of Labor and Social Protection of Population of the Republic of Tajikistan, Minister, 2003–2005,
- Parliament of the Republic of Tajikistan, Chairman of Committee on Social Policy, 1995–2003,
- Khorugh State University, Rector, 1992–1995,
- Ministry of Education of Tajikistan, Head of Department, 1991–1992,
- Tajik State National University, Assistant of Professor, Professor, 1970–1991;

== Personal life ==
- Ilolov Mamadsho and Nazirova Guldavlat married in February 1983, and in December 1983 the couple's first daughter, Purnur Ilolova, was born in Dushanbe, Tajikistan. Their son, Ahmadsho, was born in Khorog, Tajikistan in 1985. In 1988, their second daughter Sadaf was born in Dushanbe.

== Publications ==
Books - 3, scientific papers - 75
