= Juraev =

Juraev, Jurayev, Djuraev, Djurayev, Joʻrayev, Dzhurayev or Dzhuraev (Uzbek: Жўраев) is a Central Asian masculine surname, its feminine counterpart is Juraeva, Jurayeva, Djuraeva, Djurayeva, Joʻrayeva, Dzhurayeva or Dzhuraeva. The surname may refer to the following notable people:

- Abduhamid Juraev (1932–2005), Tajik mathematician
- Akbar Djuraev (born 1999), Uzbek weightlifter
- Dilshod Juraev (born 1992), Uzbek football player
- Sakhob Juraev (born 1987), Uzbek football player
- Sherali Juraev (born 1986), Uzbek judoka
- Sherali Joʻrayev, Uzbek singer, songwriter, poet, and actor
- Temur Juraev (born 1984), Uzbek football goalkeeper
- Zebo Juraeva, Uzbek football forward
- Zinura Djuraeva (born 1985), Uzbek judoka
