= Khorugh State University =

Tajikistani public university

Coordinates: 37.4919°N 71.5529°E

Khorog State University
- Type: Public
- Established: 1992
- Rector: Komilbek Amid
- Administrative staff: 200 full-time
- Students: 3000
- Location: Khorugh, GBAO, Tajikistan

Khorugh State University (also known as Khorog State University), is a public university located in Khorugh, GBAO, Tajikistan. It is located in the center of Khorugh (the capital of GBAO), the only urban center in the region. The university has an enrollment of approximately 4,000 students, both full-time (daytime) and students studying by correspondence.

== History ==
Khorugh State University was founded on August 5, 1992, by the decision of the Cabinet of the Ministers of the Republic of Tajikistan, and the same year in September started its first academic year. The university based itself in the largest and most suitable building in the city, a Soviet-built former House of Political Education (Russian: Дом Политического Просвещения, also known as Dompolit as depicted in the photo) in the center of the city on Lenin Street, across from the central square and local government buildings.

The university was named after historian, philosopher and academician Moyonsho Nazarshoev (1929–1994), (Russian/Tajik:Моёншо Назаршоевич Назаршоев), who was a native of the region and whose contribution to the foundation of the university was extremely significant. Nazarshoev was also a Vice-Premier of Tajikistan before being assassinated on February 18, 1994, in Dushanbe.

For the first time, the population of GBAO had access and the opportunity to enter a higher education institution, without leaving their own region, especially in the early 1990s, when the university was just established. In the early 1990s, during the Tajikistani Civil War, it was very dangerous, if not fatal, for Pamiri people to go to universities and other educational institutions in Dushanbe or other southern cities of Tajikistan, as they were frequently targeted by rival groups. During the first two years of the Civil War, the population of Khorugh almost doubled, receiving Pamiri refugees from other parts of Tajikistan. Among the refugees, there were people of different professions, but many were from the intelligentsia: professors and teachers who were scholars and educators in other universities and institutions in Tajikistan. Although unfortunate, the war benefited the newly established University of Khorugh, allowing it to take on faculty who might otherwise have chosen to teach elsewhere in Tajikistan.

The first Rector of the university was Academician Mamadsho Ilolov, serving from 1992 to 1995, who is currently the President of the Academy of Sciences of Tajikistan. The present Rector, the university's fourth, Gulkhoja Jangibekov, assumed office in March 2005.

The first graduator of the university was His Highness Aga Khan IV, Prince Karīm al-Hussainī, who was awarded the LL.D. (honoris causa) in May 1995.

== Academics ==
The university started with two Faculties: Humanities and Natural Sciences. After several years the Humanities Faculty divided into History-Philologic Faculty and Economic Faculty, each consisting of several departments:

- Humanities:

History
Tajik Philology
Oriental Studies
Foreign Languages
Economics

- Natural Sciences:

Physics and Mathematics
Biology
Geology
Hydromelioration

Today, this list is much longer and more diverse. Approximately 4000 students are studying in 24 specializations in 8 Faculties and 19 Departments, with access to 5 science laboratories, 4 computer labs, a library and the university's scientific journal and a newspaper. In addition, construction of a dormitory with the capacity of 1000 places is underway.

== Academic progress and achievements ==
Since its establishment in 1992, the university has made considerable progress towards filling its faculty members and diversifying. It is notable, that if initially, the faculty consisted of one staff member holding a PhD (Russian: Доктор Наук) and 6 Master's Degree (Russian: Кандидат Наук), by its 15th anniversary in 2007, it had a staff of 10 PhD holders and 46 holders of master's degrees, of which 24 were graduates of this university.

Being the only higher education institution and a place for academic work and research, KhSU attracted a lot of attention both from state and non-state actors. The Aga Khan Foundation played a key role in assisting the university in its early years with faculty, educational resources (financial and material), equipment, scholarship programs and partnerships with other universities in the region and around the world. This assistance included the creation of the English Language Department under the direction of a faculty member of Toronto University, Canada, Professor Chuck Elsey, who served as Head of the department for three years (1995–1998). It was due to the contribution of AKF and the dedication of Chuck Elsey that a fully functioning Department of Foreign Languages was not only created but then turned into a national success. Graduates of this department enjoyed a high demand for their language skills in the local and national job markets, especially with international organizations. Many were able to obtain jobs without having professional experience due to their complete fluency in foreign languages.

- Continuing Education Program

Continuing Education Program (CEP), was a joint faculty and student initiative to offer non-credit language and computer literacy courses for university students and the general public in Khorugh. Two Canadians, Chuck Elsey and Karima Kara, were the founders of the Program with local staff consisting of students from the Departments of Foreign Languages and Economics. Created in 1996, it was one of the greatest success stories of the university and its Department of Foreign Languages. After a year in operation, CEP managed not only to become financially sustainable, but also to generate enough income to expand its operations by hiring more staff, building new classrooms and purchasing new equipment. By the end of its second year of operation, it was fully staffed and managed by students.

== Rectors ==
1. (1992–1995) Ilolov Mamadsho, Mathematician
2. (1995–1998) Khayolbek Dodikhudoev, Philosopher
3. (1998–2005) Mirgand Shabozov, Mathematician
4. (2005–2012) Gulkhoja Jangibekov, Mathematician
5. (2012–2014) — Imomorbek Kalandarbekov, Mathematician
6. (2014–2021) — Shermamad Johnmamadov, Economist
7. (2021–2022) — Gulzorkhon Yusufzoda, Mathematician
8. (2022— present) — Komilbek Amid, Political scientist

== See also ==
- List of Universities in Tajikistan
