= Nonlinear Oscillations =

- Discipline: Mathematics
- Language: English
- Edited by: Anatoly M. Samoilenko

Publication details
- History: 1998–present
- Publisher: Springer Science+Business Media on behalf of the Institute of Mathematics, National Academy of Sciences of Ukraine (Ukraine)
- Frequency: Quarterly
- Impact factor: 0.279 (2013)

Standard abbreviations
- ISO 4: Nonlinear Oscil.
- MathSciNet: Nonlinear Oscil. (N. Y.)

Indexing
- ISSN: 1536-0059
- LCCN: 2005201435
- OCLC no.: 5112677

Links
- Journal homepage; Journal page on publisher's website; Online access

Nonlinear Oscillations is a quarterly peer-reviewed mathematical journal that was established in 1998. It is published by Springer Science+Business Media on behalf of the Institute of Mathematics, National Academy of Sciences of Ukraine. It covers research in the qualitative theory of differential or functional differential equations. This includes the qualitative analysis of differential equations with the help of symbolic calculus systems and applications of the theory of ordinary and functional differential equations in various fields of mathematical biology, electronics, and medicine.

Nonlinear Oscillations is a translation of the Ukrainian journal Neliniyni Kolyvannya (Ukrainian: Нелінійні коливання). The editor-in-chief is Anatoly M. Samoilenko (Institute of Mathematics of the National Academy of Sciences of Ukraine).
