= List of hospitals in Ukraine =

This list of hospitals in Ukraine includes notable and noteworthy hospitals in Ukraine throughout its history. Despite the reduction of the number of hospitals in the late 1990s because of fiscal constraints, Ukraine still has extensive health care infrastructure. Ukraine went from 3,754 hospital beds in 1994 to 2,369 hospital beds in 2012. During this period, many rural hospitals were converted into primary care clinics.

== Hospitals ==
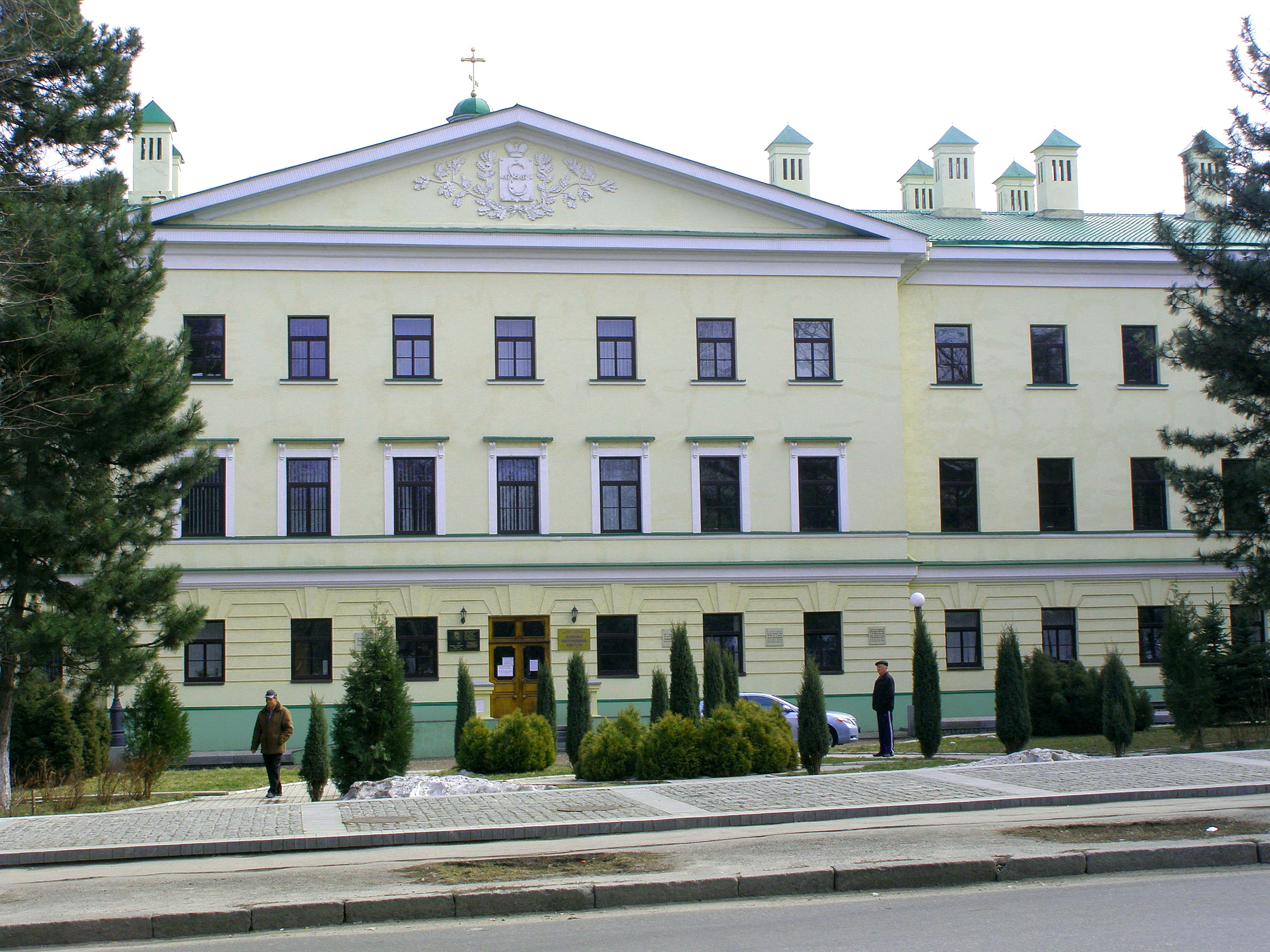
Regional Clinical Hospital, Dnipro

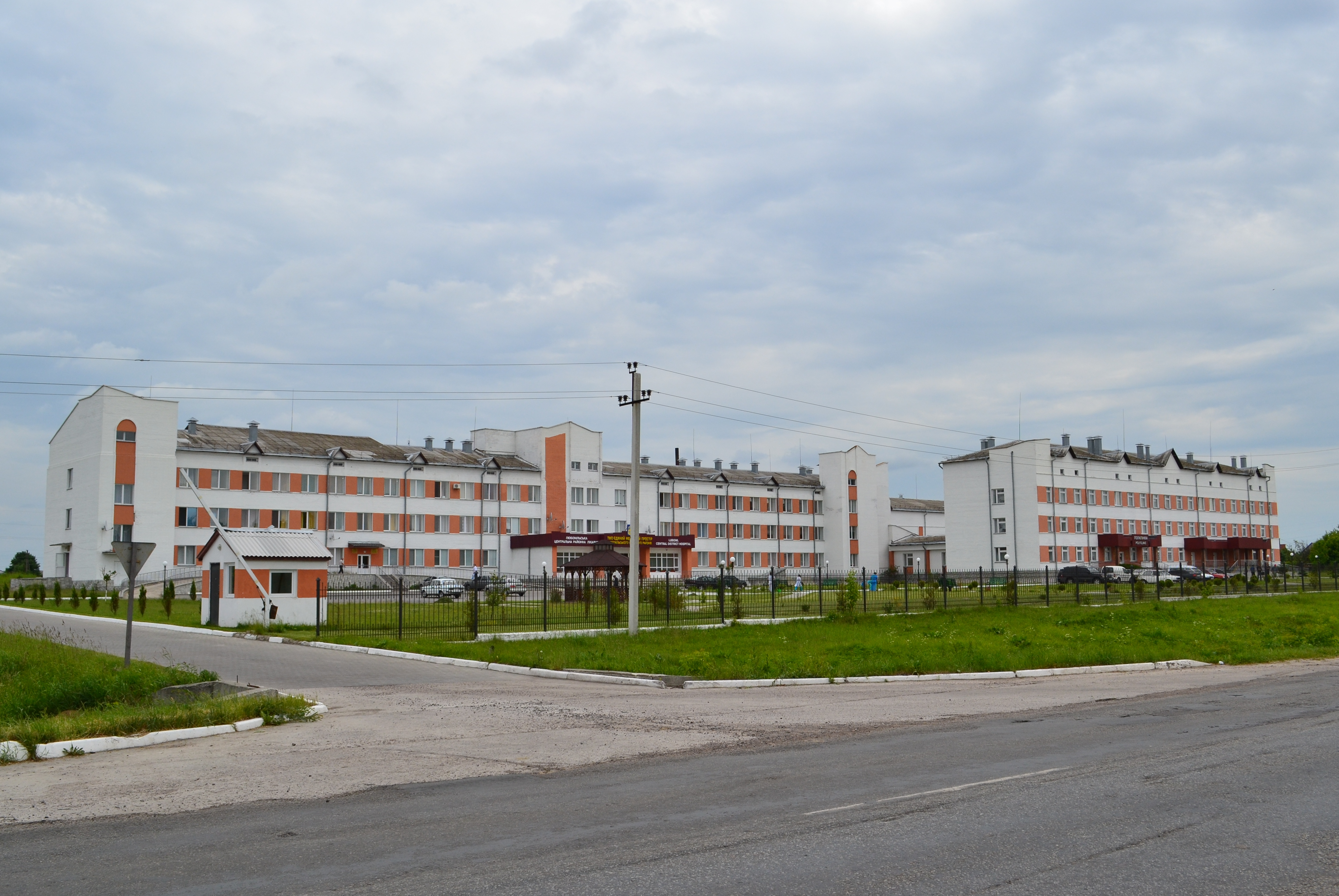
Liuboml Central District Hospital

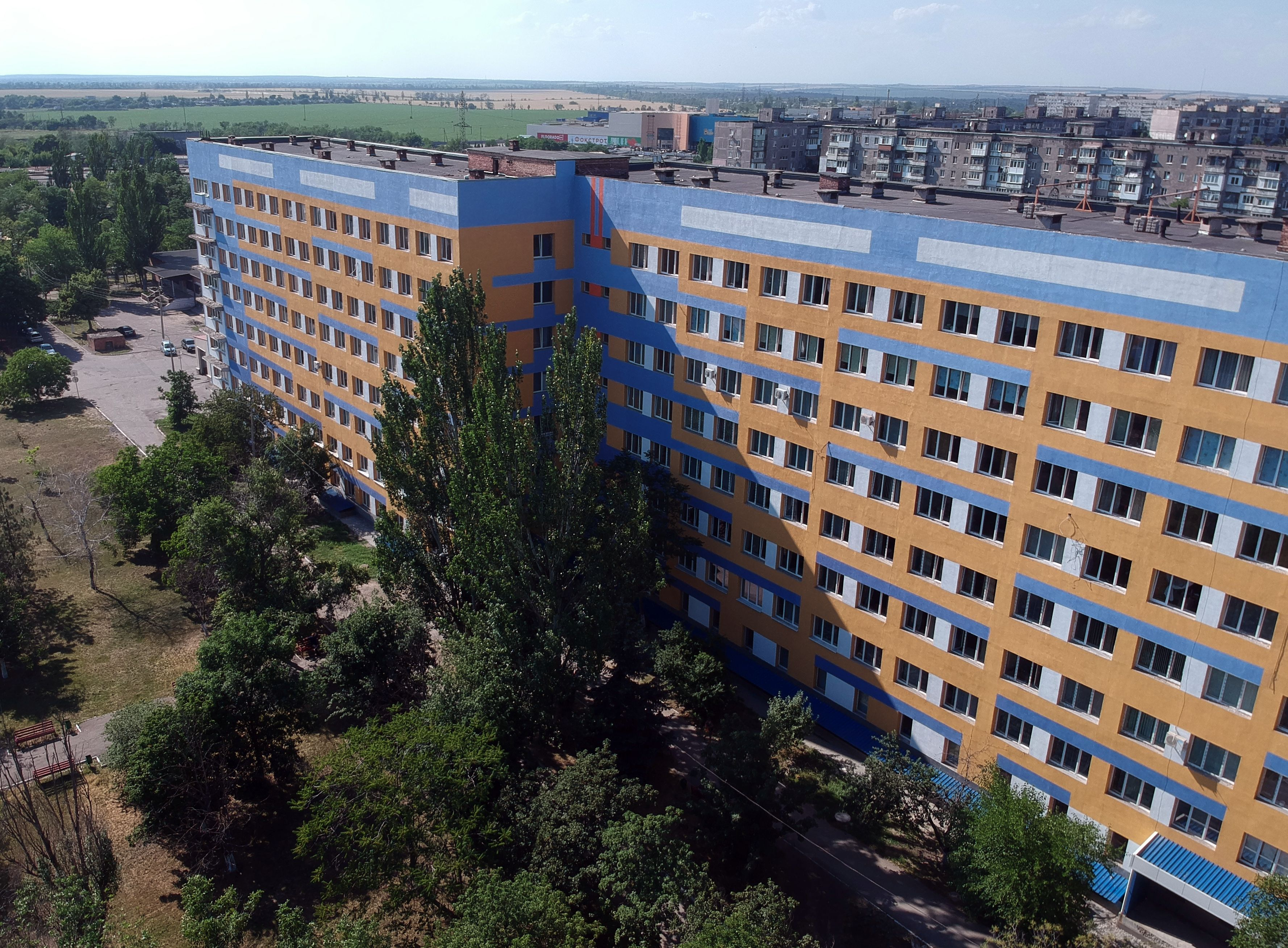
Mariupol Regional Intensive Care Hospital

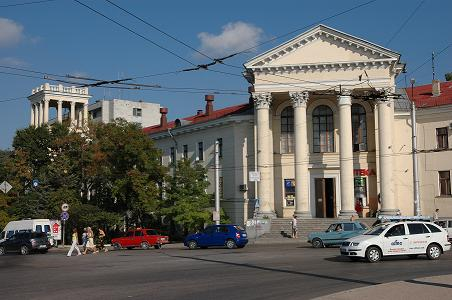
City Hospital No. 1, Sevastopol

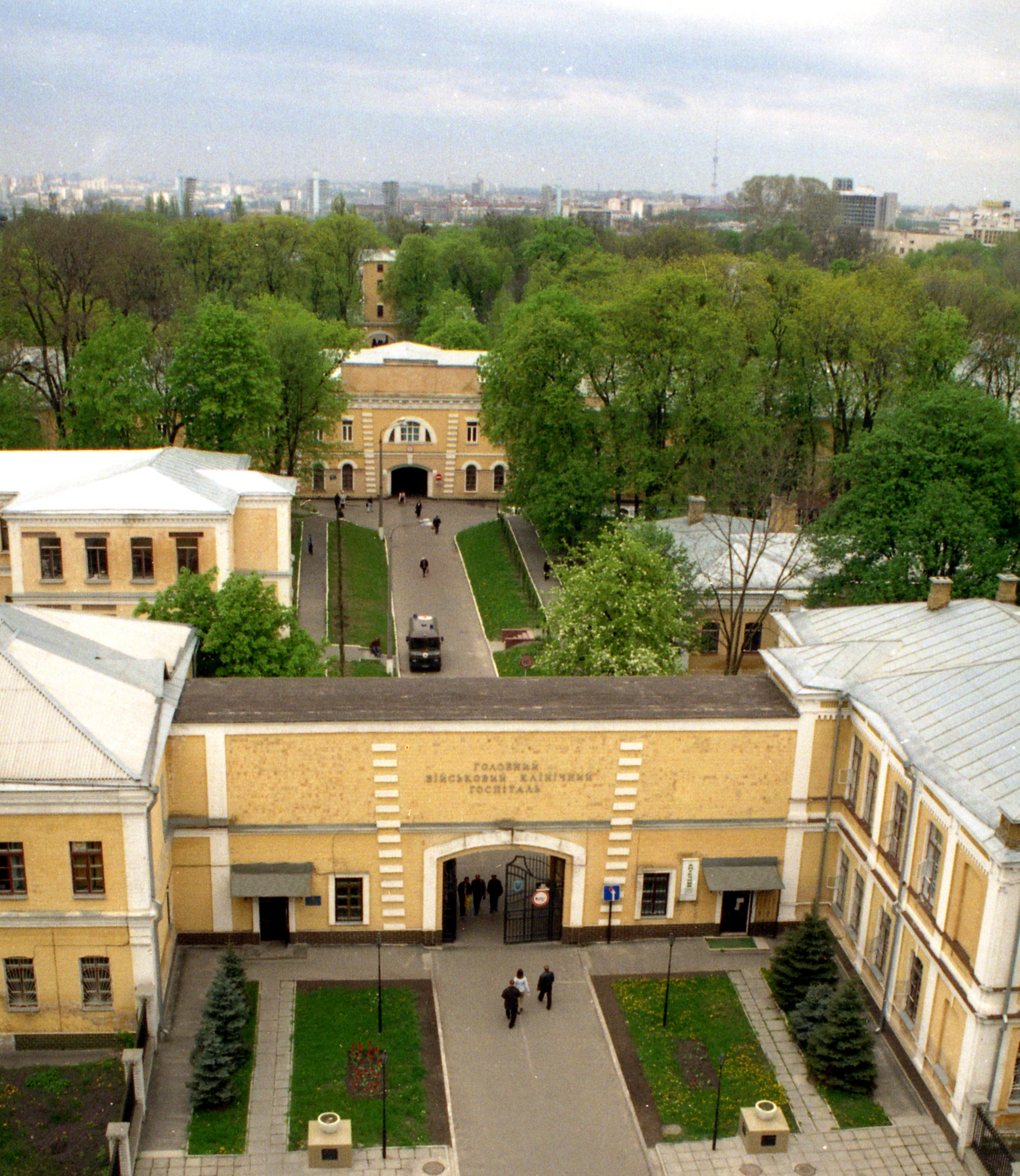
National Military Medical Center

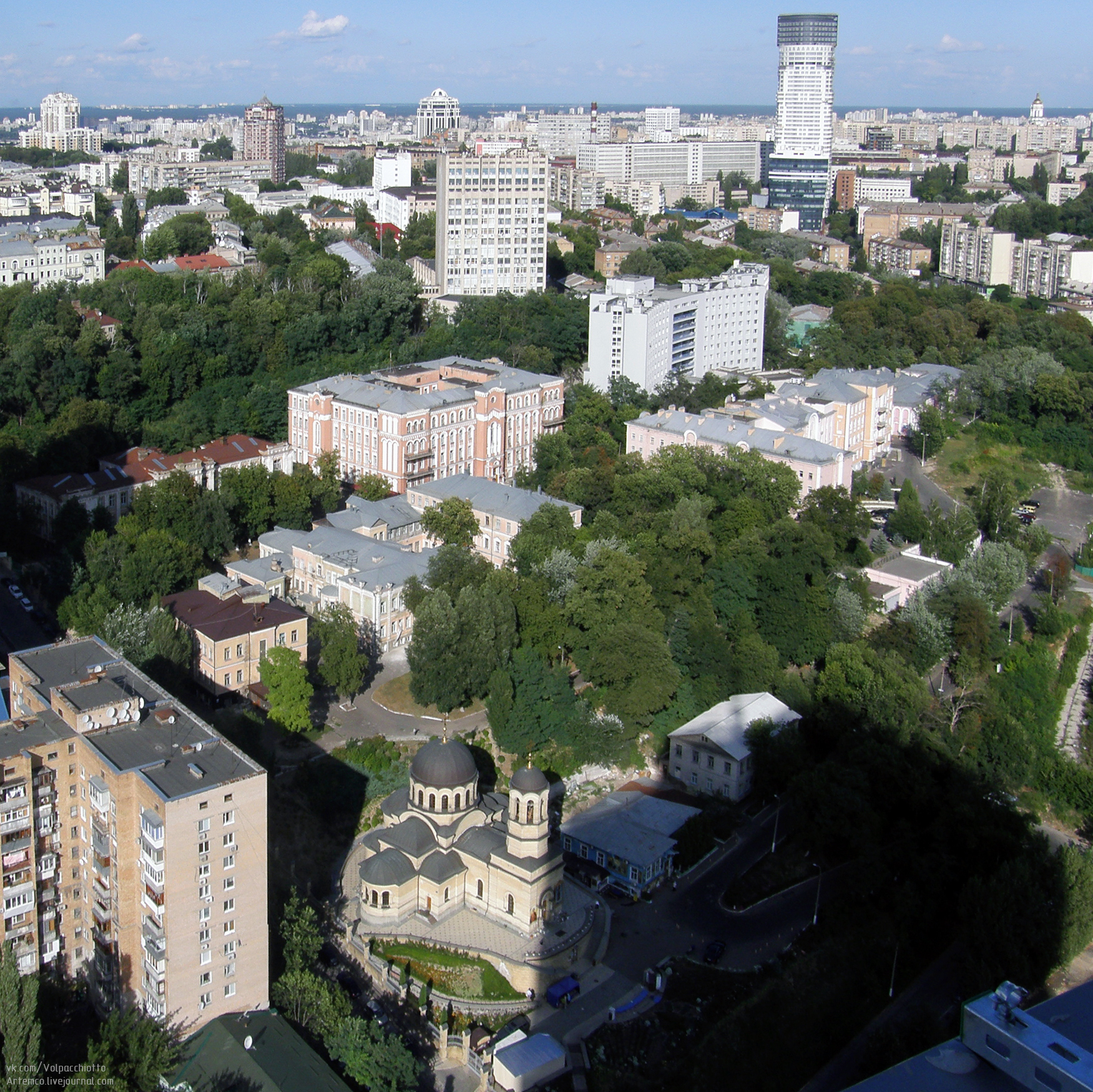
Alexander Clinical Hospital

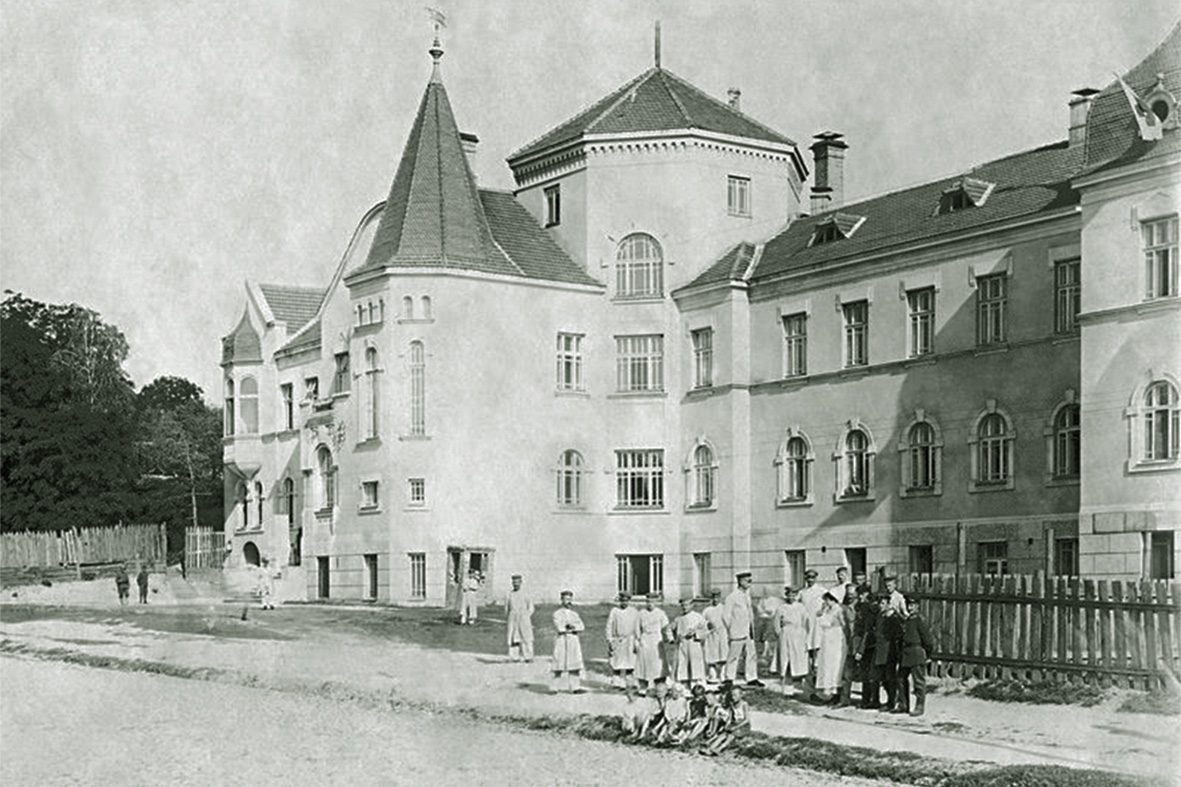
Lutheran Community Hospital (1913)

Hospitals in Ukraine
Hospital	Location	Date Established	Notes	Source
407th Military Hospital	Chernihiv	February 1933	Military hospital of the Ukrainian Armed Forces currently commanded by Colonel Oleksandr Slesarenko.	
Chernihiv medical center of modern oncology	Chernihiv			
Chernihiv Regional Clinical Hospital	Chernihiv			
Chernihiv Central District Hospital	Chernihiv			
Psychiatric Hospital ('Чернігівська обласна психоневрологічна лікарня')	Chernihiv			
Alexander Clinical Hospital	Kharkiv	1875		
American Medical Center	Lviv			
Bila Tserkva City Hospital No. 1	Bila Tserkva			
Bila Tserkva City Hospital No. 2	Bila Tserkva			
City Children's Clinical Hospital No.1	Kyiv			
City Clinical Hospital No.7	Kyiv			
City Clinical Hospital No.2	Kyiv			
City Clinical Hospital No.10	Kyiv			
City Clinical Hospital for War Veterans	Kyiv	1984		
City Psychiatric Hospital No. 1 (named for IP Pavlov)	Kyiv	1786		
City Hospital No. 1 (named for NI Pirogov)	Sevastopol	1868		
Clinic No.1 of the Scientists Hospital National Academy of Science of Ukraine	Kyiv			
Feofaniya Clinical Hospital	Kyiv	1965		
Hlukhiv Central District Hospital	Hlukhiv			
Khmelnytskyi Regional Clinical Hospital	Khmelnytskyi			
Khmelnytsky Regional Psychiatric Hospital No. 1	Skarzhintsy village, Yarmolinets District, Khmelnytskyi Oblast	1952		
Kyiv City Clinical Hospital No.18	Kyiv			
Liuboml Central District Hospital	Liuboml	2010		
Lutheran Community Hospital (named for MP Bazhana)	Kyiv	1913		
Mariupol regional intensive care hospital	Mariupol	1980		
National Emergency and Trauma Hospital	Kyiv			
National Military Clinical Hospital of the Ministry of Defense	Kyiv	1755		Oldest state hospital
Regional Clinical Hospital (named for I.I. Mechnikov)	Dnipro	1798		
Republican Clinical Hospital (named for N. A. Semashko)	Simferopol, Republic of Crimea	1914		
Ternopil University Hospital	Ternopil			
Transcarpathian Regional Clinical Hospital named after Andrew Novak	Uzhhorod	1451		
Uman City Hospital	Uman			
Usatove Hospital	Usatove			
Uman Central District Hospital	Uman			
Vinnitsa Regional Mental Hospital No.2	Vinnytsia			
Central City Hospital	Vuhledar			
Zhmerynka Railway Hospital	Zhmerynka	1898		

== See also ==
- Healthcare in Ukraine
- History of hospitals
