= Laura Gardini =

Italian mathematician (born 1952)

Laura Gardini (born 1952) is an Italian mathematician who studies chaos in dynamical systems, with applications in mathematical finance. She is professor in mathematics for economic applications at the University of Urbino.

== Education and career ==
Gardini is originally from Ravenna, where she was born on August 21, 1952. She graduated cum laude from the University of Bologna in 1975, and became a researcher for the Ente Nazionale Idrocarburi (ENI), an Italian national energy association. During this period she also taught mechanics in the Faculty of Engineering of the University of Ancona. In 1988 she moved to the University of Urbino as a researcher in mathematics for economic applications; she became associate professor there in 1992 and full professor in 1994.

She is co-editor-in-chief of the Elsevier journal Mathematics and Computers in Simulation. She is one of the founders of an annual workshop on dynamical systems in economics and finance, held at the University of Urbino since 2000.

== Recognition ==
A festschrift in honor of her 60th birthday, Global Analysis of Dynamic Models in Economics and Finance: Essays in Honour of Laura Gardini, was published in 2013.

== Books ==
Gardini is the coauthor of books including:

- Chaotic Dynamics in Two-Dimensional Noninvertible Maps (with Christian Mira, Alexandra Barugola, and Jean-Claude Cathala, World Scientific, 1996) ISBN 978-981-02-1647-4.
- Chaos in Discrete Dynamical Systems: A Visual Introduction in 2 Dimensions (with Ralph H. Abraham and Christian Mira, Springer, 1997).
- Continuous and Discontinuous Piecewise-Smooth One-Dimensional Maps: Invariant Sets and Bifurcation Structures (with Viktor Avrutin, Iryna Sushko, and Fabio Tramontana, World Scientific, 2019)
- Appunti di matematica finanziaria (with Rita Laura D'Ecclesia, 1998; 8th ed., Giappichelli, 2019)
