= Mariupol regional intensive care hospital =

Mariupol Regional Intensive Care Hospital
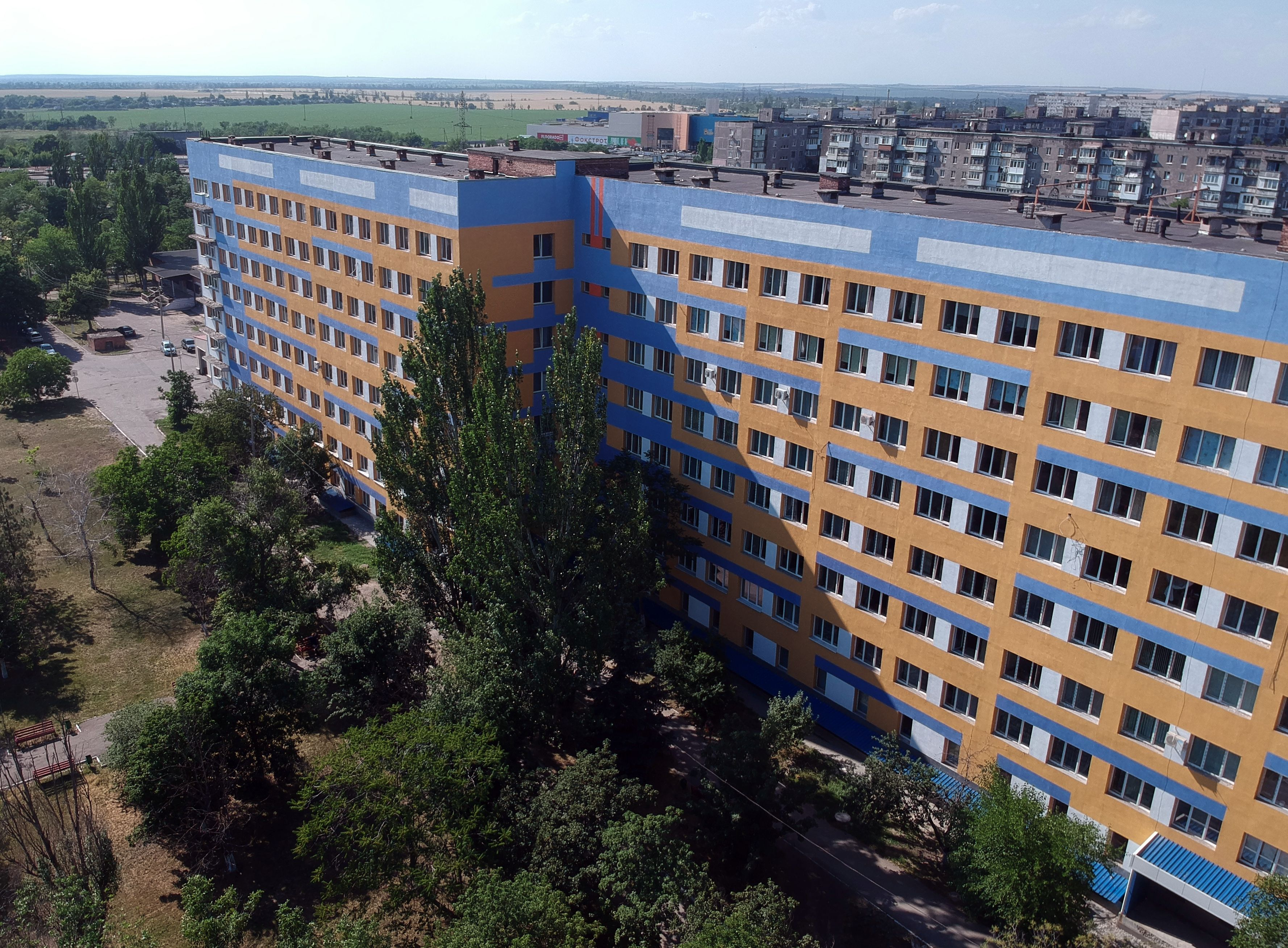
- Main building of Mariupol regional intensive care hospital

Geography
- Location: 46 Troitska Str., 87547 Mariupol, Donetsk oblast, Ukraine
- Coordinates: 47°06′38″N 37°30′44″E

Organisation
- Funding: Public hospital
- Type: Teaching
- Affiliated university: Donetsk National Medical University

Services
- Emergency department: Yes
- Beds: 550 (2019)

History
- Former name: Mariupol City Hospital No. 2
- Opened: 22 April 1980; 45 years ago

Links
- Website: www.olil.com.ua
- Lists: Hospitals in Ukraine
- Other links: www.facebook.com/olilmariupol/

The Mariupol Regional Intensive Care Hospital (Ukrainian: Обласна лікарня інтенсивного лікування м.Маріуполь), formerly known as Mariupol City Hospital No. 2 is the largest hospital in Mariupol and in the Donetsk region (Ukraine), designed to provide inpatient and outpatient tertiary level care to residents of the region and secondary to the population of the Central region of Mariupol.

== History ==
The Mariupol Regional Intensive Care Hospital was founded as the Mariupol (Zhdanov) City Hospital No. 2 in April 1980.

On 22 December 2016, by order of the chairman of the Donetsk RegionalState Administration No. 1163 "On the adoption of the common property of territorial communities of villages, towns, cities under the control of the regional council, the integral property complex of the municipal institution" Mariupol City Hospital No. 2, the city hospital was transformed into a regional hospital with a name change.

In 2019, the hospital continued work on thermal modernization of the room and repairs of the operating unit and emergency department, as well as the extension of the MRI room.

== Divisions ==
(1 January 2022):

- Emergency medical care (urgency, small operating rooms, emergency room)
- Surgery No. 1 (general, abdominal, gastrointestinal bleeding)
- Surgery No. 2 (purulent-septic, proctology)
- Traumatology (orthopedics, joint prosthetics)
- Neurosurgery (brain tumors, neurotrauma)
- Urology (lithotripsy, andrology)
- Gynecology
- Otorhinolaryngology
- Ophthalmology (eye microsurgery, lens surgery)
- Therapy (pulmonology, nephrology, toxicology)
- Neurology (cerebral strokes)
- Cardiology
- Gastroenterology
- Anesthesiology (narcosis, postoperative beds)
- Intensive care No. 1 (resuscitation)
- Intensive care No. 2 (neurological resuscitation, thrombolysis)
- Intensive care hyperbaric oxygenation (oxygen pressure chamber)
- Physiotherapy (rehabilitation, massage)
- Emergency surgical endoscopy (endoscopy, gastroscopy, colonoscopy, bronchoscopy)
- Radiation diagnostics (X-ray, mammography, spiral computed tomography, magnetic resonance imaging)
- Functional diagnostics (ultrasound, electroencephalography, Spirography)
- Pathological anatomy (autopsy, biopsy, histological laboratory)
- Clinical diagnostic laboratory (blood and urine tests, biochemistry, immunology, cytology, parasitology)
- Outpatient department (polyclinic)
- Regional telemedicine center (telehealth)
- Support services (sterilization and disinfection units, catering unit, household services, archive)
