= Sharkovskii's theorem =

Mathematical rule

In mathematics, Sharkovskii's theorem (also spelled Sharkovsky, Sharkovskiy, Šarkovskii or Sarkovskii), named after Oleksandr Mykolayovych Sharkovsky, who published it in 1964, is a result about discrete dynamical systems. One of the implications of the theorem is that if a discrete dynamical system on the real line has a periodic point of period 3, then it must have periodic points of every other period.

== Statement ==
For some interval $I\subset \mathbb{R}$, suppose that
$$f : I \to I$$
is a continuous function. The number $x$ is called a periodic point of period $m$ if $f^{(m)}(x)=x$, where $f^{(m)}$ denotes the iterated function obtained by composition of $m$ copies of $f$. The number $x$ is said to have least period $m$ if, in addition, $f^{(k)}(x)\ne x$ for all $0<k<m$. Sharkovskii's theorem concerns the possible least periods of periodic points of $f$. Consider the following ordering of the positive integers, sometimes called the Sharkovskii ordering:
$$\begin{array}{cccccccc}
3 & 5 & 7 & 9 & 11 & \ldots & (2n+1)\cdot2^{0} & \ldots\\
3\cdot2 & 5\cdot2 & 7\cdot2 & 9\cdot2 & 11\cdot2 & \ldots & (2n+1)\cdot2^{1} & \ldots\\
3\cdot2^{2} & 5\cdot2^{2} & 7\cdot2^{2} & 9\cdot2^{2} & 11\cdot2^{2} & \ldots & (2n+1)\cdot2^{2} & \ldots\\
3\cdot2^{3} & 5\cdot2^{3} & 7\cdot2^{3} & 9\cdot2^{3} & 11\cdot2^{3} & \ldots & (2n+1)\cdot2^{3} & \ldots\\
& \vdots\\
\ldots & 2^{n} & \ldots & 2^{4} & 2^{3} & 2^{2} & 2 & 1\end{array}$$

It consists of:

- the odd numbers excluding $1$ $= (2n+1)\cdot2^0$ in increasing order,
- 2 times the odd numbers $= (2n+1)\cdot2^1$ in increasing order,
- 4 times the odd numbers $= (2n+1)\cdot2^2$ in increasing order,
- 8 times the odd numbers $= (2n+1)\cdot2^3$,
- etc. $= (2n+1)\cdot2^m$
- finally, the powers of two $= 2^n$ in decreasing order.

This ordering is a total order: every positive integer appears exactly once somewhere on this list. However, it is not a well-order. In a well-order, every subset would have an earliest element, but in this order there is no earliest power of two.

Sharkovskii's theorem states that if $f$ has a periodic point of least period $m$, and $m$ precedes $n$ in the above ordering, then $f$ has also a periodic point of least period $n$.

One consequence is that if $f$ has only finitely many periodic points, then they must all have periods that are powers of two. Furthermore, if there is a periodic point of period three, then there are periodic points of all other periods.

Sharkovskii's theorem does not state that there are stable cycles of those periods, just that there are cycles of those periods. For systems such as the logistic map, the bifurcation diagram shows a range of parameter values for which apparently the only cycle has period 3. In fact, there must be cycles of all periods there, but they are not stable and therefore not visible on the computer-generated picture.

The assumption of continuity is important. Without this assumption, the discontinuous piecewise linear function $f:[0,3) \to [0,3)$ defined as:
$$f: x\mapsto \begin{cases}x+1 &\mathrm{for\ } 0\le x<2 \\ x-2 &\mathrm{for\ } 2\le x< 3\end{cases}$$
for which every value has period 3, would be a counterexample. Similarly essential is the assumption of $f$ being defined on an interval. Otherwise $f : x \mapsto (1 - x)^{-1}$, which is defined on real numbers except the number 1: $\mathbb R\setminus\{1\},$ and for which every non-zero value has period 3, would be a counterexample.

== Generalizations and related results ==
Sharkovskii also proved the converse theorem: every upper set of the above order is the set of periods for some continuous function from an interval to itself. In fact all such sets of periods are achieved by the family of functions $T_h:[0,1]\to[0,1]$, $x\mapsto\min(h,1-2|x-1/2|)$ for $h\in[0,1]$, except for the empty set of periods which is achieved by $T:\mathbb R\to\mathbb R$, $x\mapsto x+1$.

On the other hand, with additional information on the combinatorial structure of the interval map acting on the points in a periodic orbit, a period-n point may force period-3 (and hence all periods). Namely, if the orbit type (the cyclic permutation generated by the map acting on the points in the periodic orbit) has a so-called stretching pair, then this implies the existence of a periodic point of period-3. It can be shown (in an asymptotic sense) that almost all cyclic permutations admit at least one stretching pair, and hence almost all orbit types imply period-3.

Tien-Yien Li and James A. Yorke showed in 1975 that not only does the existence of a period-3 cycle imply the existence of cycles of all periods, but in addition it implies the existence of an uncountable infinitude of points that never map to any cycle (chaotic points)—a property known as period three implies chaos.

Sharkovskii's theorem does not immediately apply to dynamical systems on other topological spaces. It is easy to find a circle map with periodic points of period 3 only: take a rotation by 120 degrees, for example. But some generalizations are possible, typically involving the mapping class group of the space minus a periodic orbit. For example, Peter Kloeden showed that Sharkovskii's theorem holds for triangular mappings, i.e., mappings for which the component f_{i} depends only on the first i components x_{1},..., x_{i}.
