= Potiivka =

Village in Zhytomyr Oblast, Ukraine

Potiivka Потіївка
- Village
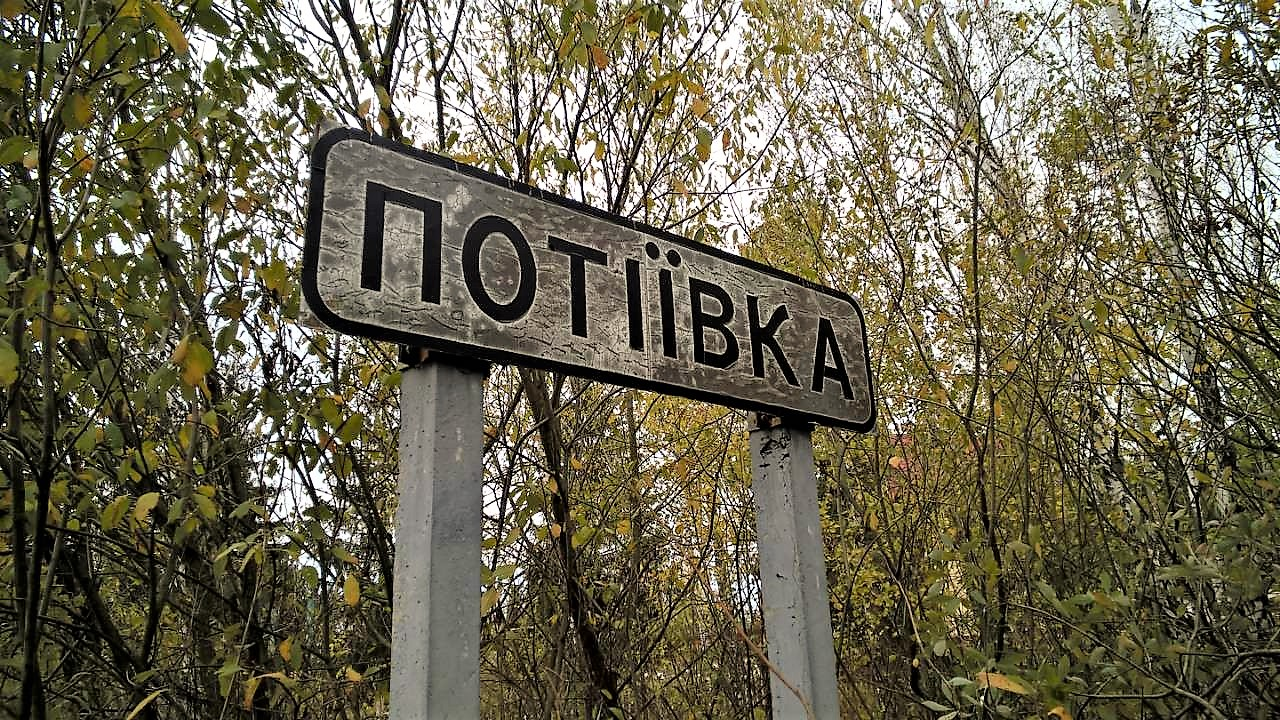

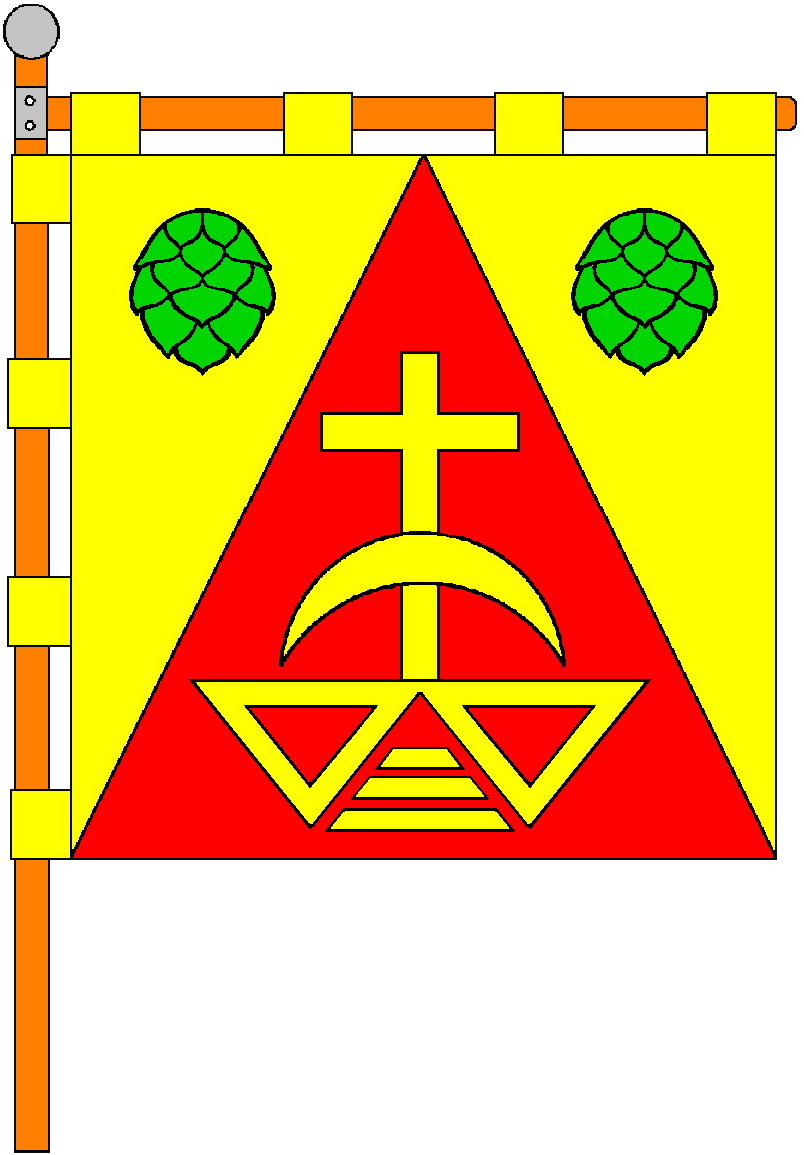
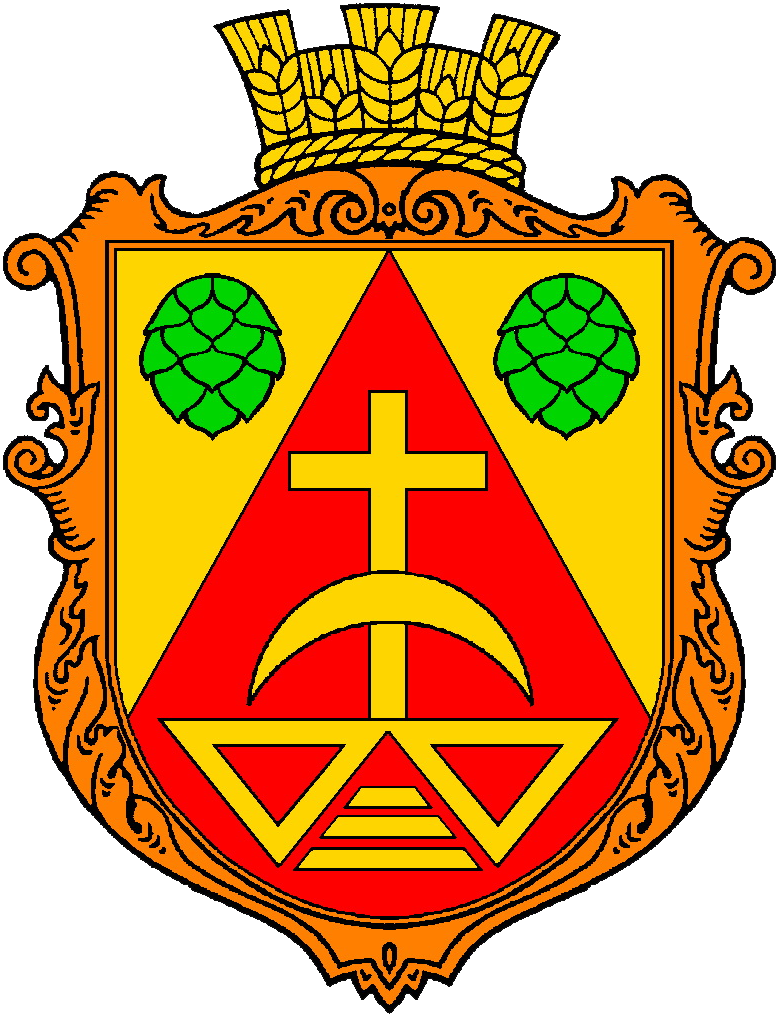
- Flag Coat of arms

- Potiivka within the map of Ukraine Potiivka (Ukraine)
- Coordinates: 50°37′11″N 28°57′52″E
- Country: Ukraine
- Oblast: Zhytomyr Oblast
- Raion: Zhytomyr Raion
- Hromada: Potiivka rural hromada

Potiivka (Ukrainian: Потіївка) is a village in the Zhytomyr Oblast (province) of northern Ukraine.

== Sources ==
- Site of this village
