= Abduhamid Juraev =

Tajik mathematician (1932–2005)

Abduhamid Juraev (10 October 1932 – 5 June 2005) Isfara, Tajikistan was a Tajik mathematician. He published many articles and books.
