= Feofaniya Clinical Hospital =

Geography
- Location: Kyiv, Ukraine
- Coordinates: 50.36215°N 30.487254°E

History
- Opened: February 9, 1965

Links
- Website: www.feofaniya.org
- Lists: Hospitals in Ukraine

Feofaniya Clinical Hospital (Ukrainian: Клінічна Лікарня "Феофанія", romanized: Klinichna Likarnia "Feofaniia") is a hospital of State Management of Affairs of Ukraine which designated to provide medical service to Ukrainian officials. It is located on the southern outskirts of Kyiv next to village of Novosilky of Fastiv Raion. Next to the hospital also is located the Main Astronomical Observatory of the National Academy of Sciences of Ukraine.

== History ==
External images
- №-1
- №-2
- №-3
- №-4

The hospital was officially opened on February 9, 1965 at the New Apiary farmstead (Nova Pasika khutir) which is former property of the Kyiv Cave Monastery next to the Holosiiv Forest that is located southward from Kyiv. Since 1934 the farmstead was closed down and the property was vacated. Construction of the new hospital started already in 1961 and in 1965 the Minister of Health Security of Ukraine (Ukrainian SSR) P.Shupyk signed the order #75 to open the hospital of the 4th Administration of Ministry of Health Security. The first patient had attended it on February 17, 1995.

The hospital initially had 135 beds and 10 treating departments with 34 medical doctors and 186 nurses. The technical support is provided by 113 engineers, technicians and other workers. Because of regular financial support from budget of Ukraine, the hospital is equipped by modern medical equipment. In 2002 the hospital was transferred to the State Management of Affairs on the order of the President of Ukraine.

== See also ==
- Feofaniya
