= Vitebsk State Technological University =

Public university in Vitebsk, Belarus

- Витебский государственный технологический университет
- Type: Public
- Established: 1965
- Rector: Andrei Kuznetsov
- Academic staff: 308
- Students: 7000
- Location: Vitebsk, Belarus
- Website: vstu.by/en/

Vitebsk State Technological University (VSTU) is a technological university located in Vitebsk, Belarus.
