= Differential Equations (journal) =

- Discipline: Differential equations
- Language: English
- Edited by: Vladimir A. Il'in

Publication details
- History: 1965–present
- Publisher: Springer
- Frequency: Monthly
- Impact factor: 0.339 (2009)

Standard abbreviations
- ISO 4: Differ. Equ.

Indexing
- CODEN: DIEQAN
- ISSN: 0012-2661 (print); 1608-3083 (web)
- LCCN: sf78000494
- OCLC no.: 01566629

Links
- Journal homepage

Differential Equations is a peer-reviewed mathematics journal published by Springer. Founded in 1965, the journal publishes English translations of papers from the journal Differentsial'nye Uravneniya (ISSN 0374-0641), which publishes in Russian and focuses on work by scholars in states of the former USSR. The journal is indexed by Mathematical Reviews and Zentralblatt MATH. Its 2009 MCQ was 0.12, and its 2009 impact factor was 0.339.
