= Yurii Mitropolskyi =

Ukrainian mathematician

Hero of Ukraine Yurii Mitropolskyi
- Born: 3 January 1917; Shishaki, Russian Empire
- Died: 14 June 2008 (aged 91); Kyiv, Ukraine
- Education: Taras Shevchenko National University of Kyiv
- Awards: Hero of Ukraine, State Prize of Ukraine in Science and Technology, Lenin Prize, Hero of Socialist Labour
- Scientific career
- Fields: mathematics, dynamical systems, differential equations
- Workplaces: Institute of Mathematics of NAS of Ukraine
- Doctoral advisor: Nikolay Bogolyubov
- Doctoral students: Oleksandr Sharkovsky

Yurii Oleksiiovych Mitropolskyi (Note: Also transliterated as Mitropolskiy, Mitropolsky or Mitropolskii) (Ukrainian: Юрій Олексійович Митропольський; 3 January 1917 – 14 June 2008) was a Soviet and Ukrainian mathematician known for his contributions to the fields of dynamical systems and nonlinear oscillations. He was born in Poltava Governorate and died in Kyiv.

He received his Ph.D. from Kyiv University, under the supervision of theoretical physicist and mathematician Nikolay Bogolyubov. Mitropolskyi is one of the most frequently joint-published mathematicians known, with at least 240 collaborators. Member of the Communist Party since 1945.

== Scientific and pedagogical activity ==
During his 60-year scientific career, Yurii Oleksiiovych obtained fundamental results in the field of asymptotic methods of nonlinear mechanics, qualitative methods of the theory of differential equations, and in the study of the dynamics of oscillatory processes in nonlinear systems. He created an algorithm for constructing an asymptotic expansion of nonlinear differential equations describing nonstationary oscillatory processes, developed a method for studying single-frequency processes in oscillatory systems with many degrees of freedom. The scientist studied systems of nonlinear differential equations describing oscillatory processes in gyroscopic, and strongly nonlinear systems, developed the theory of integral manifolds and the method of averaging. Y. Mitropolsky created a scientific team that multiplies the traditions of the school of nonlinear mechanics of academicians M. Krylov and M. Bogolyubov.

The scientist successfully combined his scientific work with teaching. For almost 40 years, Yurii Oleksiiovych lectured at the Faculty of Mechanics and Mathematics of his native university. He is the author of more than 750 scientific papers. Among his students are 25 doctors and 100 candidates of physical and mathematical sciences.

== Eponym ==
- Krylov–Bogolyubov–Mitropolskiy asymptotic method

== Selected works ==
- N. N. Bogolyubov and Y. A. Mitropolskiy. Asymptotic methods in the theory of non-linear oscillations. New York: Gordon and Breach, 1961 (translated from Russian).
- N. N. Bogolyubov, Ju. A. Mitropolskiy, and A. M. Samoilenko. Methods of accelerated convergence in nonlinear mechanics. New York: Springer-Verlag, 1976 (translated from Russian).
- Yu. A. Mitropolskiy and A. K. Lopatin. Nonlinear mechanics, groups and symmetry. Dordrecht; Boston: Kluwer Academic Publishers, 1995. ISBN 0-7923-3339-X.
- Yu. A. Mitropolskiy. Problems of the asymptotic theory of nonstationary vibrations. Jerusalem: Israel Program for Scientific Translations, 1965.
- Yu. A. Mitropolskiy, A. M. Samoilenko, and D. I. Martinyuk. Systems of evolution equations with periodic and quasiperiodic coefficients. Dordrecht; Boston: Kluwer Academic, 1993. ISBN 0-7923-2054-9.
- Integrable dynamical systems (coauthor).
