= NASU Institute of Mathematics =

Soviet-Ukrainian research institute

Institute of Mathematics
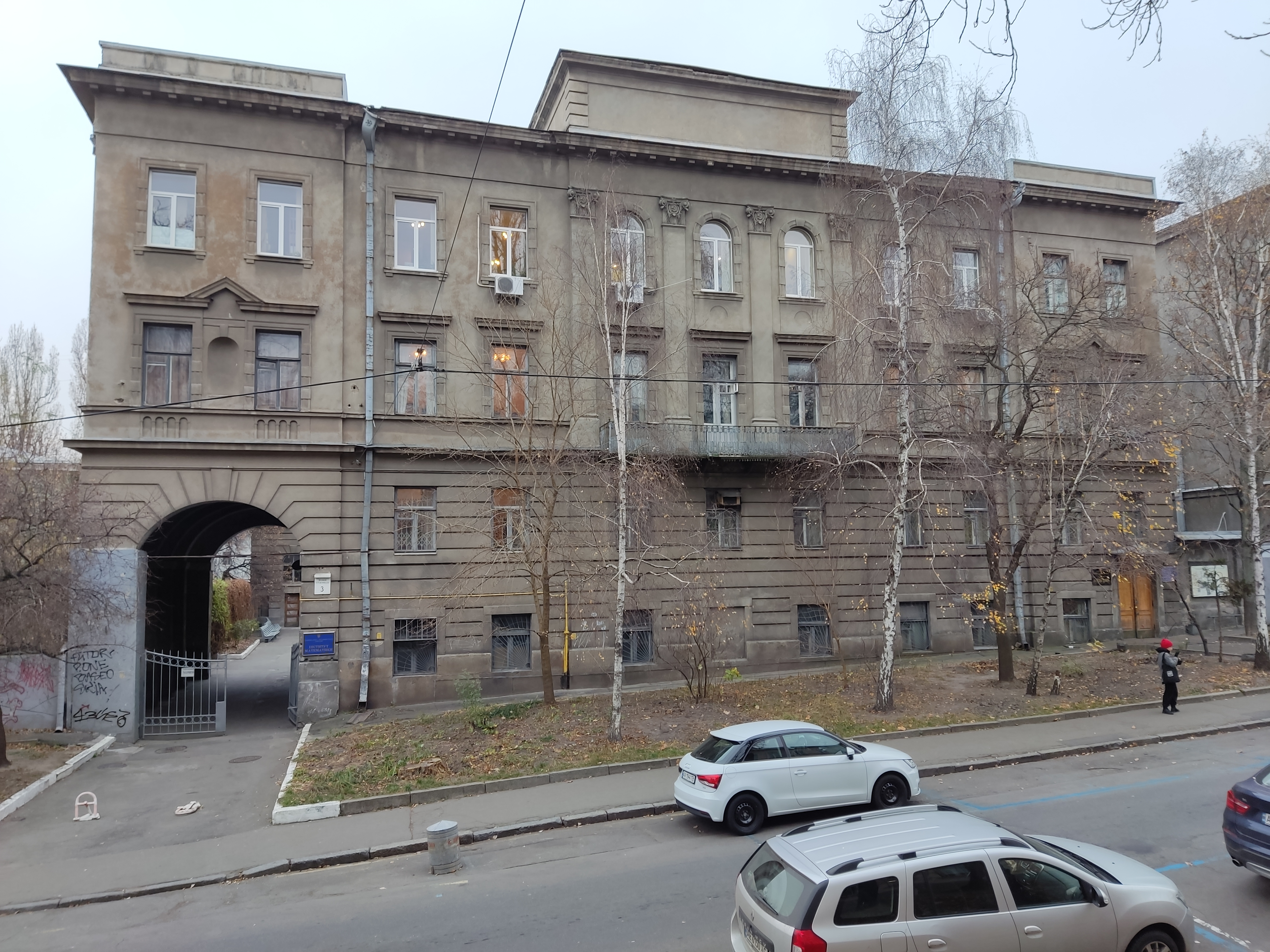
- Established: February 13, 1934
- Director: Alexander Timokha
- Staff: 112
- Address: 3, Tereschenkivska st. Kyiv-4, 01004 Ukraine
- Location: Kyiv, Ukraine
- Coordinates: 50°26′39.84″N 30°30′58.63″E
- Interactive map of Institute of Mathematics
- Website: www.imath.kiev.ua

The Institute of Mathematics of the National Academy of Sciences of Ukraine (Ukrainian: Інститут математики Національної академії наук України, romanized: Instytut matematyky Natsionalnoi akademii nauk Ukrainy) is a government-owned research institute in Ukraine that carries out basic research and trains highly qualified professionals in the field of mathematics. It was founded on 13 February 1934. The Institute is located in Tereschenkivska street 3 in Kyiv. The same building also housed the academic publisher Naukova Dumka until December 2024, when its activities were moved to publishing house Akademperiodyka across the street.

== Notable research results ==
The perturbation theory of toroidal invariant manifolds of dynamical systems was developed here by academician M. M. Bogolyubov, Yu. O. Mitropolsky, academician of the NAS of Ukraine and the Russian Academy of Sciences, and A. M. Samoilenko, academician of the NAS of Ukraine. The theory's methods are used to investigate oscillation processes in broad classes of applied problems, in particular, the phenomena of passing through resonance and various bifurcations and synchronizations.

Sharkovsky's order theorem was devised by its author while he worked for the institute. It became the basis for the theory of one-dimensional dynamical systems that enabled the study of chaotic evolutions in deterministic systems, and, in particular, of ‘ideal turbulence’.

The school of the NAS academician Yu. M. Berezansky constructed the theory of generalized functions of infinitely many variables on the basis of spectral approach and operators of generalized translation.

The school of the NAS academician A. V. Skorokhod investigated a broad range of problems related to random processes and stochastic differential equations.

Heuristic methods of phase lumping of complex systems were validated, important results in queuing theory and reliability theory were obtained, and a series of limit theorems for semi-Markov processes were proved by V. S. Korolyuk, academician of the NAS of Ukraine. He has also constructed the Poisson approximation for stochastic homogeneous additive functional with semi-Markov switching.

== Directors ==
- 1934 — 1939 Dmitry Grave
- 1939 — 1941 Mikhail Lavrentyev
- 1941 — 1944 Yurii Pfeiffer, united institute of mathematics and physics
- 1944 — 1948 Mikhail Lavrentyev
- 1948 — 1955 Aleksandr Ishlinskiy
- 1955 — 1958 Boris Gnedenko
- 1958 — 1988 Yurii Mitropolskiy
- 1988 — 2020 Anatoly Samoilenko
- 2021 — Alexander Timokha

== Scientific departments ==
- Algebra
- Analytical mechanics
- Applied researches
- Approximation theory
- Complex analysis and potential theory
- Differential equations and oscillation theory
- Dynamics and stability of multi-dimensional systems
- Fractal Analysis
- Functional Analysis
- Mathematical physics
- Nonlinear analysis
- Numerical mathematics
- Partial differential equations
- Theory of dynamical systems
- Theory of functions
- Theory of random processes
- Topology

== Publications ==
The Institute publishes several scientific journals:

- Methods of Functional Analysis and Topology
- Nonlinear Oscillations
- Symmetry, integrability and Geometry: Methods and Applications (SIGMA)
- Ukrainian Mathematical Journal
