= Tajik Academy of Sciences =

Academic institution in Tajikistan

Academy of Sciences of the Republic of Tajikistan
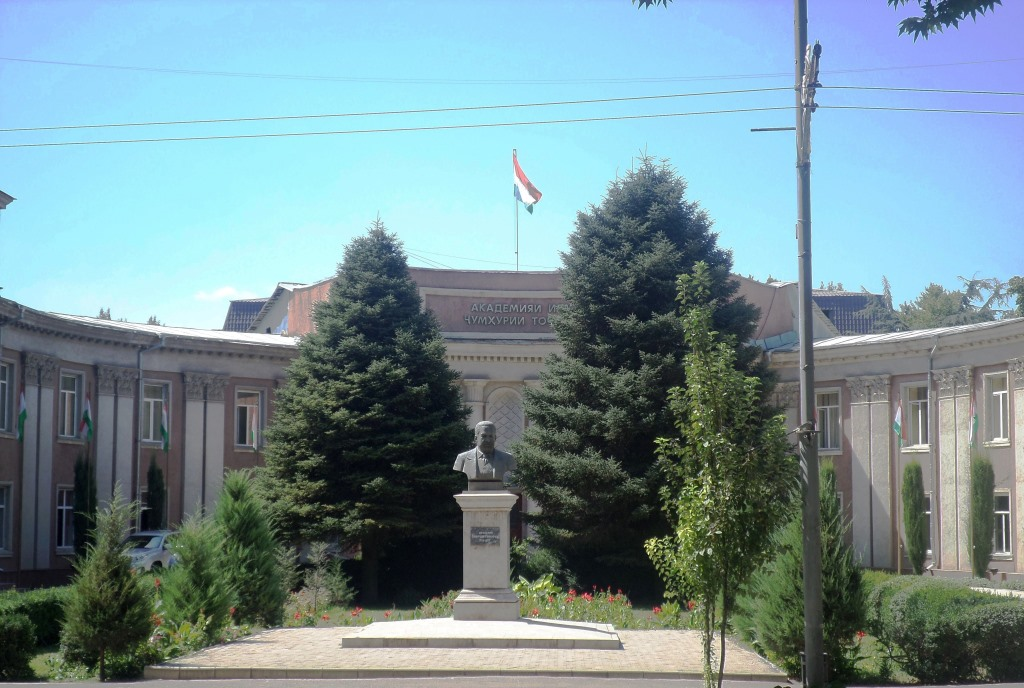
- Main building of the academy (2015)
- Other name: Академияи илмҳои Ҷумҳурии Тоҷикистон (Tajik); Академия наук Республики Таджикистан (Russian)
- Established: 14 April 1951; 75 years ago
- President: Kobiljon Khushvakhtzoda
- Members: 44
- Address: 33 Rudaki Avenue, Dushanbe 734025, Tajikistan
- Location: Tajikistan
- Coordinates: 38°34′8.1″N 68°47′27.1″E
- Interactive map of Academy of Sciences of the Republic of Tajikistan
- Website: anrt.tj/en/

The Academy of Sciences of the Republic of Tajikistan (Note: Tajik: Академияи илмҳои Ҷумҳурии Тоҷикистон, Akademiyai ilmhoi Jumhuriyi Tojikiston; Russian: Академия наук Республики Таджикистан, Akademija nauk Respubliki Tadžikistan) is Tajikistan's highest self governing national scientific institution. It is responsible for coordinating fundamental and applied research, and supporting the development and application of scientific knowledge in the country. The Academy is headquartered in Dushanbe, with two branches in Khujand and Khorog. It is a member of the International Science Council, having joined since 2002.

== History ==
The Tajik Academy of Sciences traces its origins to 1933, when a Tajik facility was established within the Academy of Sciences of the Soviet Union. In 1940, it was reorganised as the Tajik Branch of the Academy of Sciences of the Soviet Union.

On 14 April 1951, the Academy of Sciences of the Tajik Soviet Socialist Republic (SSR) was established by a resolution of the Council of Ministers of the Soviet Union and designated the republic's highest scientific institution. The Academy was organised into three principal divisions covering the physics, mathematical, chemical, and geological sciences; biological and medical sciences; and the humanities and social sciences.

The Academy subsequently expanded with the establishment of additional research institutes and departments, including those concerned with agriculture, mineral resources and energy, as well as geotechnical studies. These were considered essential for the development of the country. By the late 1970s, it employed about 1,300 scientific personnel.

Following Tajikistan's independence in 1991, the institution became known as the Academy of Sciences of the Republic of Tajikistan. Its activities were disrupted during the Tajikistani Civil War, before expanding again to more than 1,700 staff at the turn of the century.

== Membership ==
Only citizens of Tajikistan can hold full or associate membership of the Academy. The General Assembly elects full members, who can hold the position for life, from among scientists who have made notable scientific contributions, while associate members are selected from among other distinguished scientists. The Academy may confer honorary membership on citizens recognised for significant contributions to the economy, culture, education, science, or technology. It may also elect distinguished foreign scientists who have supported the development of science and culture in Tajikistan or contributed to the training of Tajik scientists as foreign members.

== President ==
The presidents of the Tajik Academy of Sciences since its establishment in 1951 are:

- Sadriddin Ayni (1951–1954)
- Sultan Umarov (1954–1964)
- Muhammad Asimi (1965–1988)
- Tsabet Nematullahyev (1988–1995)
- Ulmas Mirsaidov (1995–2005)
- Mamadsho Ilolov (2005–2013)
- Farhad Rahimi (2013–2024)
- Kobiljon Khushvakhtzoda (2024–present)

== Structure ==
Currently, the Tajik Academy of Sciences comprises 6 directorates, 19 departments, and 5 centres, including:

Structure of Tajik Academy of Sciences
Directorates	Departments	Centres
Accounting, Financial Planning & Property Management; Scientific Personnel Training; International Relations & Cooperation with International Organizations; Council for Coordination of Research Activities; Council on Publishing Activities; Attestation Commission	Physical, Mathematical, Chemical, Geological & Technical Sciences; Biological Sciences; Social & Humanitarian Sciences; Medical & Pharmaceutical Sciences; Commercialization of Scientific Results; Scientific & Organizational; Cooperation with School Students; Human Resources & Special Works; Records Management, Control & Archiving; Organizational & Administrative Affairs; Legal; Press & Public Relations; Publishing; Information Technology & Digital Infrastructure; Capital Construction; Presidential Fund for Fundamental Research; Art Studies; Geography & Remote Sensing of the Earth; Formation of National Identity & Popularization of Science	Oriental Studies & Written Heritage; Anthropology; Central Asian Research Center for Ecology and Environment; China–Tajikistan Innovation Center for Natural Products; International Center "Pamir-Chakaltay"
