= Sofia Berezanska =

Ukrainian archaeologist (1924–2024)

- Софія Березанська
- Born: Sofia Stanislavivna Berezanska; 15 May 1924; Kamianets-Podilskyi, Ukrainian SSR, Soviet Union
- Died: 2 May 2024 (aged 99); Kyiv, Ukraine
- Occupation: Archeologist
- Awards: State Prize of Ukraine in Science and Technology

Sofia Stanislavivna Berezanska (Ukrainian: Софія Станіславівна Березанська; 15 May 1924 - 2 May 2024) was a Ukrainian archaeologist who focused on the Bronze Age. A graduate of the History Department of the Taras Shevchenko National University of Kyiv and the NASU Institute of Archaeology, she worked as a senior research associate at the Kherson Local History Museum from 1948 to 1949. Berezanska then worked at the NASU Institute of Archaeology, firstly as a junior researcher, then as a senior researcher and finally as lead researcher. She conducted approximately 40 archaeological expeditions and was the author of monographs, collective books and articles. Berezanska was made laureate of the State Prize of Ukraine in Science and Technology in 1977.

== Early life and education ==
Berezanska was born in Kamianets-Podilskyi in today the Khmelnytskyi Oblast on 15 May 1924. Her family was a noble one that had connections to deep intellectual traditions. Berezanska's father, a former adjutant to General Aleksei Brusilov, was arrested in 1932 and the family was exiled to Astrakhan. Following the completion of her education, the Second World War broke out and she was exiled once again, this time to northern Kazakhstan. Berezanska began working as a tractor driver after she finished her schooling. She later illegally moved to Kyzylorda and enrolled at the city's United Ukrainian University in 1943 after discovering a loophole allowing her to gain entry to the university. At the first chance she had, Berezanka returned to Ukraine and enrolled at the History Department of the Taras Shevchenko National University of Kyiv. She graduated with honours in 1948. In late 1949, Berezanska enrolled on the postgraduate programme at the NASU Institute of Archaeology. She studied under the supervision of Efimenko Petr Petrovich and was connected with the department of Scythian-Sarmatian archaeology. Berezanka graduated from the institute in 1953 and later defended her thesis, which was on the Monuments of the Pre-Scythian Time in the Uman Region and Their Historical Significance on Belozerka culture.

== Career ==
According to her recollections, she had a chance meeting with the archaeologist Lazar Slavin, who helped her get an assignment with the Kherson Local History Museum. Berezanska began working at the museum as a senior research associate in May 1948 and left in November 1949. She arranged the exhibits during the restoration of the archaeological exposition in the daytime and worked in the library during the night. Nrezanska was advised by Slavin and was introduced to the works of Viktor Hoshkevych and Irina Fabritsius. In 1953, she began working as a junior researcher in the Department of Primitive Archaeology of the NASU Institute of Archaeology and was later promoted to senior researcher in 1966 and was lead researcher between 1986 and 1997. Berezanka focused on the study of the history of the population and settlements of Northern Ukraine during the early, middle and late Bronze Ages. This meant her works were mainly focused on the East European forest steppe and Polesia regions. Brezanka conducted approximately 40 archaeological expeditions, including long-term expeditions that were close to the village of Pustynka, Chernihiv Raion, in the Usovoe Ozero tract, Donetsk region and the village of Gordiyivka, Vinnytsia Oblast. She established the concept of cultural development of the Northern Ukrainian population from the northeastern variants of the Cucuteni–Trypillia culture through the monuments from Corded Ware culture to the East Shyns and White-breasted (early Iron Age) and Early Slavs formations. Berezanska also identified the Multi-cordoned ware culture, East Shtynytsia and Lebedivka cultures and, in the 1960s, developed a methodology for the identification and full disclosure of all residential structures at the studied monuments.

She was the author often monographs, co-authoring two of them, five collective books and approximately 110 articles. They were published in German, Russian and Ukrainian. The first Berezanka wrote was called The Bronze Age in Ukraine and it was published in 1964. She contributed to the second volume of the collective monographs Archaeology of the Ukrainian SSR in 1971, and went on to write The Middle Bronze Age in Northern Ukraine in 1972, Pustynka. Settlement of the Bronze Age on the Dnieper in 1974 and Northern Ukraine in the Bronze Age in 1982. Berezanka was the author of the doctoral dissertation Northern Ukraine in the Bronze Age (the middle and second half of the 2nd millennium BC) in 1977. She contributed to the monographs Archaeology of the Ukrainian SSR and Ancient History of Ukraine. Primitive Society. In 1986, Berezanka was the co-author of Culture of the Bronze Age in the Territory of Ukraine. She also conducted research on the Usovoe Ozero settlement and this led to the publication of Usovoe Ozero: Log-house Culture Settlements on the Northern Dinka in 1990. In 1994, Berezanka contributed to the monograph Crafts of the Eneolithic-Bronze Age in Ukraine. She contributed to the first volume of Ancient History of Ukraine. Primitive Society in 1997 and was a co-author of the German-language monograph Das Grabenfeld von Gordeevka in 1998.

She retired in 1997 but continued to work professionally.

== Personal life and recognition ==
She was married to the mathematician Yury Berezansky. There was one child of the marriage. In 1977, Berezanka was made a laureate of the State Prize of Ukraine in Science and Technology. She died in Kyiv on 2 May 2024.
