= State Prize of Ukraine in Science and Technology =

Ukrainian state prize for science

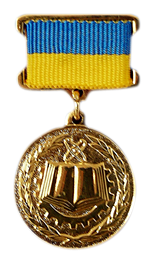
- Type: Medal
- Presented by: the President of Ukraine

Precedence
- Next (higher): None

State Prize of Ukraine in Science and Technology (Ukrainian: Державна премія України в галузі науки і техніки) is an annual award given by the President of Ukraine for accomplishments in science and technology. It is given for one of four categories: outstanding scientific research in the humanities, social, or natural sciences; development of new equipment, technologies, or methods of disease prevention; the solution of environment problems or invention of new environmental conservation techniques; or textbooks or new vocational techniques. It is the highest award given by The Government of Ukraine for accomplishments in science and technology. Recipients are called Laureates of the State Prize of Ukraine in the field of science and technology.

== History ==
The State Prize of Ukraine in Science and Technology was established by the Council of Ministers of the Ukrainian SSR in 1969. Winners have been named every year since then (see the list of winners in Ukrainian). The prize is often given to groups of researchers for joint work on one project, and applicants will often apply as a team organized around one shared project, such as a book that they coauthored. In 2016, Petro Poroshenko set the number of state prizes awarded annually at a maximum of 15, with no more than 8 of the prizes being awarded to coauthors on a given project. The prize is accompanied by a monetary award. The composition of the committee that decides the award is directly set by the President of Ukraine; in 2015, it was set at 70 people, and chaired by figures in the National Academy of Sciences of Ukraine and the Ministry of Education and Science of Ukraine. The committee contains members from diverse disciplines, including natural science, social sciences, law, humanities, agriculture, and machining.

== Description ==
The award is given by the National Academy of Educational Sciences of Ukraine, and awardees are selected by the President of Ukraine. The recipients of the award are announced each year by presidential decree.

The prize is one of the orders, decorations, and medals of Ukraine, which are described by the Government of Ukraine as "the highest form of recognition of citizens for outstanding services in the development of economy, science, culture, social sphere, defense of the Fatherland, protection of constitutional human rights and freedoms, state building and public activity". In full, the award is given for:

Humanities, natural and technical sciences, positively influencing the social progress and maintaining the recognition of the national science in the world; for the development and introduction of new techniques, materials and technologies, new ways and methods of treatment and prevention of diseases that meet the level of the world advances; for works that constitute a significant contribution to solving problems of environmental protection and ensuring ecological safety; creation of textbooks meeting the contemporary requirements and encouraging effective knowledge acquisition, and essentially influencing the improvement of future specialists' training.

== Laureates ==
- Aleksandr Akhiezer
- Aleksandr Pavlovich Aleksandrov
- Nikolai Amosov
- Tetiana Andriienko
- Mykola Azarov
- Nikolai Bagrov
- Oleksandra Bandura
- Tatyana Bakhteeva
- Yuriy Bazhal
- Sofia Berezanska
- Raisa Bogatyrova
- Vyacheslav Boguslayev
- Alexander Boichuk
- Volodymyr Borysovsky
- Volodymyr Boyko
- Viktor Bryukhanov
- Georgii Chornyi
- Igor Chueshov
- Yuriy Drozd
- Oleh Dubyna
- Oleh Dyomin
- Ivan Dziuba
- Pavlo Fedorenko
- Gennadiy Feldman
- Vitold Fokin
- Iosif Gikhman
- Roman Gladyshevskii
- Anatolii Goldberg
- Valentina Gorbachuk
- Borys Grynyov
- Vasyl Grytsak
- Anatoliy Holubchenko
- Volodymyr Horbulin
- Mykhailo Hrechyna
- Mikhail Kadets
- Heorhiy Kirpa
- Asya Kolchynska
- Serhiy Komisarenko
- Yuri Kondratiev
- Yuriy Kondufor
- Olena Koppel
- Valery Korepanov
- Mykhailo Korolenko
- Volodymyr Korolyuk
- Arnold Kosevich
- Platon Kostiuk
- Yevheniia Kucherenko
- Leonid Kuchma
- Serhiy Kunitsyn
- Georgy Kurdyumov
- Oleksandr Kuzmuk
- Vasyl Lazoryshynets
- Boris Levin
- Mikhail Pavlovich Lisitsa
- Yaroslav Lopatinskii
- Vladimir Lyakhov
- Volodymyr Lytvyn
- Lyubov Mala
- Vladimir Marchenko
- Aleksandr Markevich
- Anatoliy Mazaraki
- Dmytro Melnychuk
- Yurii Mitropolskiy
- Vladyslav Monchenko
- Volodymyr Morhun
- Vasyl Moroz
- Anatoly Morozov
- Yurii G. Naidyuk
- Volodymyr Nemoshkalenko
- Sergey Nikolsky
- Aleksander Omelyanchuk
- Oleksiy Onyschenko
- Iossif Ostrovskii
- Leo Palatnik
- Olena Parkhomchuk
- Borys Paton
- Victor Pinchuk
- Ivan Plachkov
- Vladimir Nikolaevich Platonov
- Aleksei Pogorelov
- Petro Poroshenko
- Omeljan Pritsak
- Oleksiy Prylipka
- Halyna Puchkivska
- Oleksandr Ryzhenkov
- Serhiy Ryzhkov
- Borys Sabarko
- Anatoly Samoilenko
- Vitaliy Satskyi
- Valerii Semenets
- Mariya Shcherbina
- Anatoly Shekhovtsov
- Eduard Shifrin
- Volodymyr Shkidchenko
- Leonid Shkolnick
- Yuriy G. Shkuratov
- Valeriy Shmarov
- Naum Z. Shor
- Anatoly Shvidenko
- Isaak Sigal
- Galyna Skibo
- Anatoliy Skorokhod
- Ihor Smeshko
- Valeriy Smoliy
- Valentyn Symonenko
- Kostiantyn Sytnyk
- Dmytro Tabachnyk
- Oleksandr Tikhonov
- Petro Tolochko
- Isaac Trachtenberg
- Serhiy Tulub
- Vladimir Turkevich
- Ivan Vakarchuk
- Taras Vintsiuk
- Leontii Voitovych
- Myhailo Yadrenko
- Yuri Yampolsky
- Illia Yemets
- Kateryna Yushchenko
- Viktor Yushchenko
- Mykhaylo Zagirnyak
- Igor Zagorodniuk
- Anatoliy Zahorodniy
- Yuri G. Zdesenko
- Mariya Zerova
- Mykhailo Zghurovskyi
- Mykhailo Ilchenko
- Mykola Kaidenko
- Yurii Ivliev
- Valentyn Zghursky
- Oleksandr Zinchenko
- Yukhym Zvyahilsky
- Oleh Smutok
