= Ludmyla Nagorna =

Ukrainian scientist (1932–2013)

- Нагорна Людмила Лаврентіївна
- Born: 5 October 1932; Uman, Ukrainian SSR (now Ukraine)
- Died: 20 June 2013 (aged 80); Kharkiv, Ukraine
- Citizenship: Ukraine
- Known for: lead tungstate crystals
- Awards: State Prize of Ukraine in Science and Technology (2016), Order of the Badge of Honour (USSR)
- Scientific career
- Fields: Chemistry
- Workplaces: Institute for Single Crystals and Institute for Scintillation Materials

Ludmyla Nagorna (Ukrainian: Нагорна Людмила Лаврентіївна; 5 October 1932 – 20 June 2013) was a Ukrainian scientist, PhD in chemistry, senior researcher of the department of refractory scintillation materials of Institute for Scintillation Materials. Honorary Doctor of Scientific and technological complex "Institute for Single Crystals" of the National Academy of Sciences of Ukraine.

== Career ==
In 1992, Ludmyla Nagorna proposed to use lead tungstate crystals (PbWO_{4}) for particle physics experiments. They are now at the heart of calorimeters of the ALICE and CMS detectors at the LHC, CERN.

Laureate (posthumously) State Prize of Ukraine in Science and Technology (2016) for the work "Properties of neutrinos and the weak interaction, searching for effects beyond the Standard Model of elementary particles".

== Publications ==
She has 78 publications in Scopus database under name "Ludmila Nagornaya". She holds 10 Ukrainian patents.
