= Oleksandr Tikhonov =

Ukrainian pharmacist (1938–2019)

Oleksandr Ivanovych Tikhonov
- Born: 11 September 1938; Kharkiv, Ukrainian SSR
- Died: 25 February 2019 (aged 80); Kharkiv, Ukraine
- Education: National University of Pharmacy
- Known for: Apitherapy
- Awards: Honored Scientist of Ukraine (1990); State Prize of Ukraine in Science and Technology (2013); Orders of Merit, II and III class Medals of VDNKh
- Scientific career
- Fields: pharmacy
- Workplaces: National University of Pharmacy

Oleksandr Tikhonov (Ukrainian: Олекса́ндр Іва́нович Тіхонов; 11 September 1938 – 25 February 2019) was a Soviet and Ukrainian pharmacist, Doctor of Pharmacy, Distinguished Professor at the National University of Pharmacy, and President of the Ukrainian Association of Apitherapists. He was Academician of the Ukrainian Academy of Sciences (from 2006), Honored Scientist of Ukraine (1990), and Laureate of the State Prize of Ukraine in Science and Technology for the year 2013.

== Career ==
Tikhonov graduated from the National University of Pharmacy in 1961. He worked at the Zaporizhia State Medical University and in 1969 he defended his Candidate of Sciences dissertation. After 1982 he worked at his alma mater, where he was a professor from 1984. In 1983, he defended his doctoral dissertation.

From 1985 to 2012, Tikhonov headed the Department of Pharmacy Technology of Drugs (ATL) at the National University of Pharmacy; he also served as vice chancellor of the university from 1991 to 2002.

== Monographs ==
- Теория и практика производства лекарственных препаратов прополиса / А. И. Тихонов и др. Под редакцией А. И. Тихонова. — Х.: Основа, 1998. — 384 p.
- Teoria I praktyka wytwarzania leczniczych preparatow propolisowych / Pod redakcja akademika A.I. Tichonowa Redaktor wydania polskiego prof. dr hab. Bogdan Kedzia / Tichonov A.I., Jarnych T.G., Czernych W.P., Zupaniec I.A., Tichonowa S.A. — Drukaznia «Marka». — Kraków. — 2005. — 274 p.
- Пыльца цветочная (обножка пчелиная) в фармации и медицине / А. И. Тихонов, К. Содзавичный, С. А. Тихонова, Т. Г. Ярных; / Под ред. акад. А. И. Тихонова. — Х.: Изд-во НФаУ; 2006. — 308 p.
- Pylek kwiatowy obnoze pszczele w farmacji i medycynie. Teoria, technologia, zastosowanie lecznicze / Pod red. A.I. Tichonowa. Tichonow A.I., Sodzawiczny K., Tichonowa S.A., Jarnych T.G., Bondarczuk L.I., Kotenko A.M. — Kraków: Apipol-Pharma, 2008. — 274 p.
- Мед натуральный в медицине и фармации (происхождение, свойства, применение, лекарственные препараты) : монография / А. И. Тихонов и др. ; под ред. А. И. Тихонова. — Х. : Оригинал, 2010. — 263 p.
- Яд пчелиный в фармации и медицине (теория, технология, медицинское применение): Монография / А. И. Тихонов и др. Под ред. А. И. Тихонова. — Х.: Оригинал, 2010. — 280 p.
- Jad Pszczeli w farmacji i medycynie (Teoria, technologia, zastosowanie lecznicze) / Pod redakcja Akademika Ukrainskiej Akademii Nauk A.I. Tichonowa. Redakcja wydania polskiego: Krystian Sodzawiczny, Bogdan Kedzia. — Apipol-Farma. — Myślenice, 2011. — 240 p.
