= Yevheniia Kucherenko =

Soviet Ukrainian pedagogue

- Євгенія Кучеренко
- Born: Yevheniia Markiianivna Kucherenko; 27 December 1922; Kachanivka, Pryluky Raion, Chernihiv Oblast, Ukrainian SSR
- Died: 29 December 2020 (aged 98)
- Occupation: Pedagogue
- Years active: 1947–1996
- Awards: Hero of Socialist Labour; Order of Lenin; State Prize of Ukraine in Science and Technology

Yevheniia Markiianivna Kucherenko (Ukrainian: Євгенія Маркіянівна Кучеренко; 27 December 1922 – 29 December 2020) was a Soviet Ukrainian pedagogue of the Ukrainian language and literature at the No. 74 Lviv Secondary Comprehensive School in the village of Rudne for 49 years until her retirement in 1996. She had more than 70 of her works published in methodological journals in the Ukrainian educational press. Kucherenko was awarded the Hero of Socialist Labour with the Order of Lenin and the "Hammer and Sickle" gold medal in 1968 and the State Prize of Ukraine in Science and Technology in 1977.

== Biography ==
On 27 December 1922, Kuchreneko was born into a peasant family in the village of Kachanivka, Pryluky Raion, Chernihiv Oblast, Ukraine. She left Zakin Nemiriv Pedagogical Technical School in 1939, and graduated from Vinnytsia State Pedagogical University in 1946.

Following her graduation from university, Kucherenko was sent to work in the Lviv Oblast. She worked as a teacher of the Ukrainian language and literature at the No. 74 Lviv Secondary Comprehensive School in the village of Rudne for the following 49 years until she retired from work in 1996. Kucherenko was one of the first educators in the Lviv Oblast to employ technical teaching aids such as tape records, grammophone records, film stills and transparencies. In 1970, she became a member of the Communist Party of the Soviet Union, and was an elected a scientific correspondent of the Instytut pedahohiky. Kucherenko earned her Candidate of Sciences in Pedagogy with a dissertation on 27 December 1972.

From 1959, more than 70 of Kucherenko's works were published in methodological journals in the Ukrainian educational press. She published Movie development at literature lessons in the fifth grade (Speech development at literature lessons in grade 5" (1965) in 1965 and Movie development at literature lessons in grades 4–5 (Speech development at literature lessons in grades 4 -5 grades 11 years later. She collaborated with the Instytut pedahohiky employee Oleksandra Bandura to publish the textbook Ukrainian Literature, 5th grade in 1969. Throughout the 1990s, Kucherenko co-wrote Ukrainian language textbooks for students in grades 5 to 8 in the newly independent Ukraine. She authored a textbook on Ukrainian literature for schools in independent Ukraine teaching Polish and Ukrainian, with instructions.

Kucherenko was repeatedly elected to serve as a deputy on the local village council and was a deputy on the Lviv City Council for a quarter-of-a-century. She was elected chair of the Commission on Youth Affairs and was a member of the regional committee of a trade union. Kucherenko was resident in the city of Lviv and died on 29 December 2020.

== Awards ==
She was awarded the Hero of Socialist Labour with the Order of Lenin and the "Hammer and Sickle" gold medal on 1 July 1968. Kucherenko and Bandura both received the State Prize of Ukraine in Science and Technology on 13 December 1977, for their work on the eighth edition of the textbook Ukrainian literature, 5th grade.
