= Oleksiy Onyschenko =

Oleksiy Semenovych Onyschenko
- Born: March 17, 1933 (age 93); Village of Rudka, near Poltava, Ukraine
- Citizenship: Ukraine
- Education: Kiev University
- Scientific career
- Fields: Culturology
- Workplaces: Vernadsky National Library of Ukraine; Presidium of the National Academy of Sciences of Ukraine

Oleksiy Semenovych Onyschenko (in Ukrainian: Олексій Семенович Онищенко) is a philosopher and culture theorist, Honoured Worker of Science and Technology of Ukraine, Academician of the National Academy of Sciences of Ukraine (1997), Recipient of the State Prize of Ukraine in Science and Technology (2008), Professor and Doctor of Philosophy, Doctor Honoris Causa, Taras Shevchenko National University of Kyiv. He is the Head of the Division of History, Philosophy and Law of the National Academy of Sciences of Ukraine and the General Director of V.I. Vernadsky National Library of Ukraine.

== Life ==
External images
- №-1
- №-2
- №-3

Oleksiy Semenovych Onyschenko was born on March 17, 1933, in the village of Rudka near Poltava, Ukraine. In 1956 he graduated from the Faculty of History and Philosophy of the Kiev State University (now, Taras Shevchenko National University of Kyiv), and in 1962 completed his postgraduate studies at the Institute of Philosophy of the Academy of Sciences of Ukraine (then, Ukrainian Soviet Socialist Republic). Having started his academic career as Junior Researcher in 1962, he continued as Research Associate and Senior Research Associate until progressing to the position of the deputy director for Academic Work of the Institute of Philosophy of the Academy of Sciences of Ukraine in 1978. He later worked as Director of the Inter-republican Branch of the Academy of Social Sciences in Kiev (until 1991). His research focused on philosophical and sociological problems of development of intellectual and spiritual culture, evolution of mass consciousness and the way of life, scientific and technological revolution, sociology of religion and the history of religion in Ukraine. Since 1992, O.S. Onyschenko has been heading the Vernadsky National Academic Library of Ukraine. In 1997, he was elected Academician of the National Academy of Sciences of Ukraine under the specialty "Culturology". In 1998, Academician Onyschenko was elected Academic Secretary of the Division of History, Philosophy, and Law of the National Academy of Sciences of Ukraine.

== Honours and awards ==
- Order of the Badge of Honour — 1981
- Order of Merit, Third Class — 1998
- Order of Prince Yaroslav the Wise, Fifth Class — 2003
- Winner of Ukraine's "Person of the Year" contest in the category "Scientist of the Year" — 2006
- Order of Prince Yaroslav the Wise, Fourth Class — 2008
- Ukrainian State Prize in science and technology — 2008

== Books ==
- Ideĭna kryza relihiï i relihiĭnyĭ modernizm / [vidp. red. O.S. Onyshchenko.] (Kiev: Naukova dumka, 1974) [The ideational crisis of religion and religious modernism]
- Sot︠s︡ialʹnyĭ progress, religiia, ateizm (Kiev: Naukova dumka, 1977) [Social progress, religion, atheism]
- Istoriia khrystyians'koi tserkvy na Ukraihi: relihiieznavchyi dovidkovyi narys / [vidp. red. O.S. Onyshchenko.] (Kiev: Naukova dumka, 1992) [A history of the Christian Church in Ukraine: An essay in religious studies]
- Iuriĭ Oleksiĭovych Mezhenko (1892-1969): Materialy do biohrafiï / [vidp. red. O.S. Onyshchenko.] (Kiev: Instytut ukraïnsʹkoï arkheohrafiï NAN Ukraïny, 1994) [ Yurii Oleksiiovych Mezhenko (1892–1969): Biographical materials]
- Prosvityteli Kyrylo i Mefodiĭ u pysemnykh dzherelakh Instytutu rukopysu TSNB NAN Ukraïny: katalog rukopysiv druhoï polovyny XV-pershoï chverti XX st. / [vidp. red. P.S. Sokhanʹ, O.S. Onyshchenko]. (Kiev: Instytut ukraïnsʹkoï arkheohrafiï, 1995) [Educators Cyril and Methodius in written sources of the Institute of Manuscript, the Vernadsky National Library of Ukraine: The catalogue of the manuscripts, 15th-20th centuries]
- Kyievo-Mohyliansʹka akademiia : u dokumentakh i ridkisnykh vydanniakh TSentralʹnoï naukovoï biblioteky im. V.I. Vernadsʹkoho NAN Ukraïny / [vidp. red. O.S. Onyshchenko] (Kiev: Instytut ukraïnsʹkoï arkheohrafiï, 1995) [The Kyiv-Mohyla Academy in documents and rare prints of the Vernadsky National Library of Ukraine]
- Vydatni vcheni Natsionalʹnoï Akademiï nauk Ukraïny : osobovi arkhivni ta rukopysni fondy akademikiv i chleniv-korespondentiv u Natsionalʹniĭ Bibliotetsi Ukraïny imeni V.I. Vernadsʹkoho; (1918-1998) putivnyk / [hol. red. O.S. Onyshchenko]. (Kiev: Biblioteka, 1998) [Distinguished scholars of the National Academy of Sciences of Ukraine: personal archives and manuscripts of Academicians and Corresponding Members of the academy in the Vernadsky National Library of Ukraine, 1918–1998; A guide book]
- Arkhivni ustanovy Ukraïny : dovidnyk / [red. koll. O.S. Onyshchenko ... et al.]. (Kiev: Komitet, 2000) [Archival institutions of Ukraine: A directory]
- Ukraïnsʹka revoliutsiia i derzhavnistʹ (1917-1920 rr.): naukovo-bibliohrafichne vydannia / [hol. red. O.S. Onyshchenko] (Kiev: Vernadsky National Library of Ukraine, 2001) [The Ukrainian revolution and the statehood: 1917-1920]
- Osobovi arkhivni fondy Instytutu rukopysu : putivnyk / [vidp. red. O.S. Onyshchenko] (Kiev: Vernadsky National Library of Ukraine, 2002) [Personal archival funds of the Institute of the Manuscript: A guide book]
- Istoriia natsionalʹnoï akademiï nauk Ukraïny 1938-1941: dokumenty i materialy / [vidp. red. O.S. Onyshchenko] (Kiev: NBUV, 2003) [A history of the National Academy of Sciences of Ukraine 1938-1941: Documents and materials]
- Naukovi biblioteky Ukraïny : dovidnyk / [vidp. red. O.S. Onyshchenko] (Kiev: NBUV, 2004) [Academic libraries in Ukraine: A directory]
- Natsionalʹna akademiia nauk Ukraïny : problemy rozvytku ta vkhodzhennia v ievropeĭskyĭ naukovyĭ prostir / [O.S. Onyshchenko, B.A. Malitsʹkyi, red.] (Kiev: NBUV, 2007) [The National Academy of Sciences of Ukraine: Issues in development and integration into the European academic space]
- Ukraïna—Monholiia : 800 rokiv u konteksti istoriï: zbirnyk naukovykh prat͡s / [O.S. Onyshchenko, hol. red.] (Kiev: NBUV, 2008) [Ukraine and Mongolia: 800 years in the context of history: A collective monograph]
- Bibliotechna sprava v Ukraïni v XX stolitti / With L.A. Dubrovina. (Kiev: NBUV, 2009) [The library profession in Ukraine in the 20th century]
- Intehratsiia Ukraïny u svitove spivtovarystvo v konteksti rozvytku bibliotechnykh informatsiĭnykh tekhnolohiĭ / [Coll. monograph: O.S. Onyschenko et al.] (Kiev: NBUV, 2011) [Ukraine's integration into the world community in the context of development of library information technologies]
- Natsionalʹnyĭ informatsiĭnyĭ suverenitet u konteksti rozvytku novitnikh informatsiĭnykh tekhnolohiĭ / [Coll. monograph: O.S. Onyshchenko ... et al.] (Kiev: NBUV, 2011) [The national information sovereignty in the context of development of modern information technologies]
- Informatsiĭna skladova sotsiokulʹturnoï transformatsiï ukraïnsʹkoho suspilʹstva [Coll. monograph: O.S. Onyshchenko ... et al.] (Kiev: NBUV, 2012) [The information component of the socio-cultural transformation of the Ukrainian society]

== Books about Oleksiy Semenovych Onyschenko ==
- Oleksiĭ Semenovych Onyshchenko : materialy do biobibliohrafiï / T.V. Dobko, A.L. Panova. (Kiev: NBUV, 2003)
- Lichnost' v istorii kul'tury. Akademik Aleksei Onischenko A person in the history of culture. Academician Aleksei Onischenko (Moscow: BUL, 2013)
