= Olena Koppel =

Ukraining political scientist

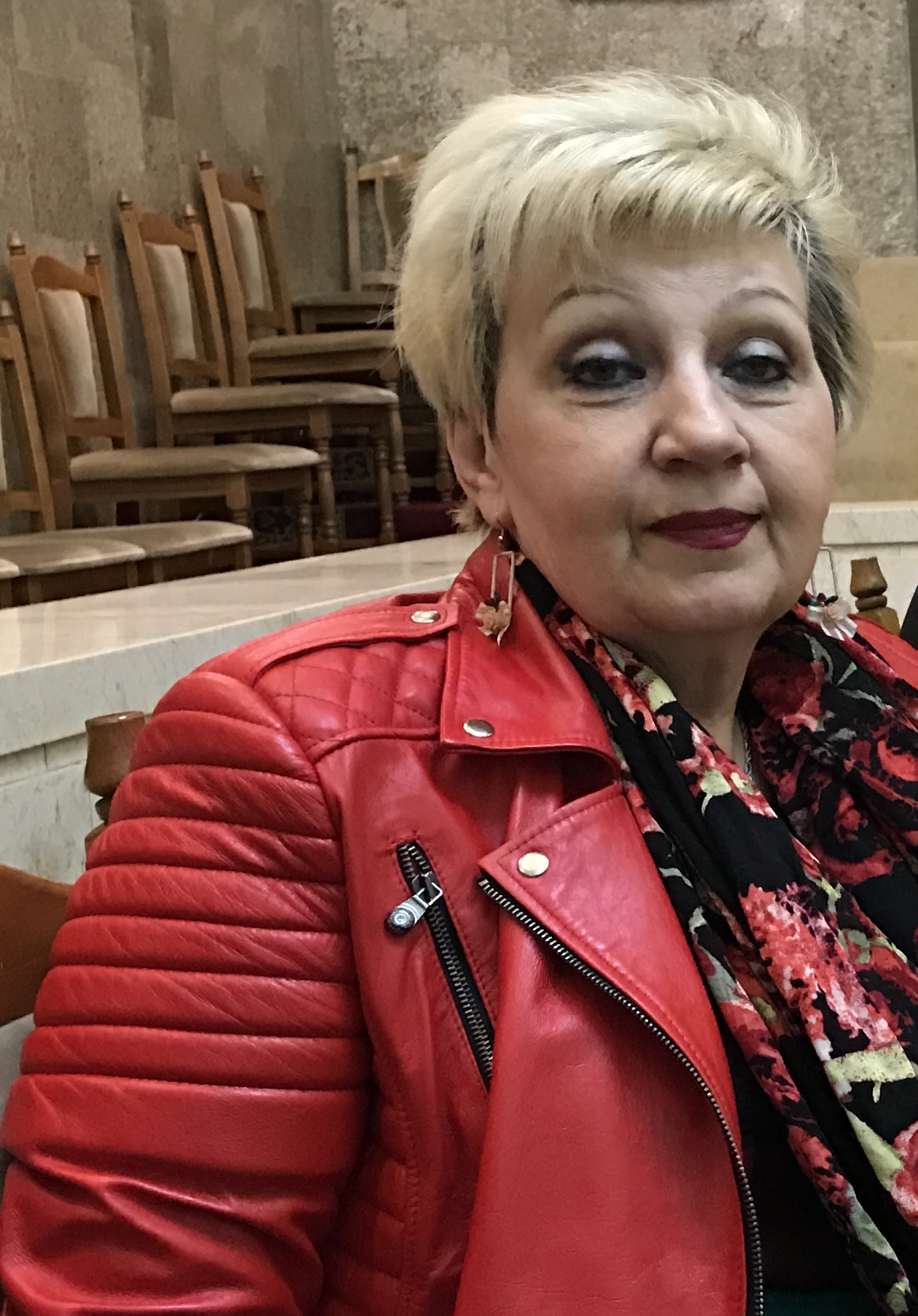
- Education: Taras Shevchenko National University of Kyiv
- Awards: State Prize of Ukraine in Science and Technology
- Scientific career
- Fields: Political science
- Workplaces: Taras Shevchenko National University of Kyiv

Koppel Olena Arnoldivna (Ukrainian: Коппель Олена Арнольдівна, also written Russian: Коппель Елена Арнольдовна or Koppel Elena Arnoldovna) is a Ukrainian political scientist. She is a professor in the Department of International Relations and Foreign Policy within the Institute of International Relations at the Taras Shevchenko National University of Kyiv. Koppel studies global development, international systems, Middle East relations, and the role of religion in global political affairs. She is a laureate of the State Prize of Ukraine in Science and Technology.

== Career ==
In 1977, Koppel graduated with an honors' diploma from the history faculty of the Taras Shevchenko National University of Kyiv. In 1981, she was a candidate in historical sciences at Taras Shevchenko National University of Kyiv, and in 1999 she defended a doctoral dissertation in historical sciences there. She was also awarded a Diploma of the Ministry of Foreign Affairs of Ukraine.

Beginning in 1985, Koppel became an assistant professor at the Department of International Relations and Foreign Policy at Taras Shevchenko National University of Kyiv, and in 1999 she became a professor there. From 1984 to 1986, she was also an associate professor of the Department of Humanities of the Preparatory Faculty for Foreign Citizens of the Taras Shevchenko National University of Kyiv. In 2000, Koppel was a visiting researcher at the University of Münster. The same year, she was awarded the prize for the best lecturer at the University of Kyiv.

In 1999, Koppel coauthored a textbook with Olena Parkhomchuk called International relations of the twentieth century. This text covers the creation of the Versailles-Washington System of international relations, its collapse after World War II, and international relations during and after The Cold War. In 2020, Koppel was one of the contributors to a research methods monograph by the Kuyavian University in Włocławek. In 2001, she wrote another textbook, International systems and World Politics. In addition to textbooks, she has published books of original research, and her work on Middle East relations includes authoring the 1999 book The problem of security in the Persian Gulf in the 70's-90's.

For her contributions to the 2008 textbook series World politics and global development, Koppel was named a 2012 laureate of the State Prize of Ukraine in Science and Technology.

Koppel was one of two co-chairs of Scientific and Methodological Board of the Institute of International Relations at Taras Shevchenko National University.

== Selected works ==
- International relations of the twentieth century (1999)
- The problem of security in the Persian Gulf in the 70's-90's (1999)
- International systems and World Politics (2001)

== Selected awards ==
- Best Lecturer prize, University of Kyiv (2000)
- State Prize of Ukraine in Science and Technology (2012)
