= Volodymyr Melnyk =

Ukrainian professor of philosophy, rector of the University of Lviv

- Володимир Мельник
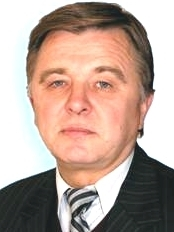

Rector of the University of Lviv
- In office 10 June 2014 – 20 June 2025
- Preceded by: Vasyl Vysochanskyi
- Succeeded by: Roman Hladyshevskyi

Personal details
- Born: 25 November 1952 (age 73) Plyskiv, Ukrainian SSR, Soviet Union (now Ukraine)
- Education: Lviv Polytechnic
- Occupation: Professor

Volodymyr Petrovych Melnyk (Ukrainian: Володимир Петрович Мельник; born 25 November 1952) is a Ukrainian professor of philosophy who served as rector of the University of Lviv between 2014 and 2025.

He graduated from Lviv Polytechnic. Between 1996 and 2014 he was decan of Faculty of Philosophy in Lviv University.
