= Valentina Gorbachuk =

Ukrainian mathematician

Valentina Ivanivna Gorbachuk (born 1937) is a Soviet and Ukrainian mathematician, specializing in operator theory and partial differential equations.

== Education and career ==
Gorbachuk was born in Mogilev on 25 June 1937; then part of the Soviet Union, it has since become part of Belarus. Her parents worked as an accountant and a telegraphist; in search of better work, they moved to Lutsk in what is now Ukraine when Gorbachuk was a child, and that is where she was schooled.

She applied to study mathematics and mechanics at Taras Shevchenko National University of Kyiv, but was denied because of a "stay in the occupation". Instead, she went to the Lutsk Pedagogical Institute, graduating in 1959. On the advice of one of her faculty mentors there, S.I. Zuhovitsky, she entered graduate study at the NASU Institute of Mathematics, as a student of Yury Berezansky, earning a candidate degree (the Soviet equivalent of a Ph.D.) in the early 1960s.

She continued as a researcher at the Institute of Mathematics for the rest of her career, defending a Doctor of Science (equivalent of a habilitation under the former Soviet system) in 1992.

== Books ==
Gorbachuk is the coauthor, with M. L. Gorbachuk, of two books on operator theory, translated from Russian into English:

- Boundary value problems for operator differential equations (Naukova Dumka, 1984; trans., Mathematics and its Applications 48, Kluwer, 1991)
- M. G. Krein’s lectures on entire operators (Operator Theory: Advances and Applications, 97, Birkhäuser, 1997)

== Recognition ==
In 1998, Gorbachuk won the State Prize of Ukraine in Science and Technology.

== Personal life ==
Gorbachuk worked closely with her husband, Miroslav L'vovich Gorbachuk (1938–2017), a mathematician with whom she shared her research interests. Their son, Volodymyr Myroslavovich Gorbachuk, is an associate professor of mathematical physics at the Igor Sikorsky Kyiv Polytechnic Institute (National Technical University of Ukraine).
