= Vladimir Nikolaevich Platonov =

Soviet and Ukrainian sports scientist and academic (born 1941)

- Володимир Миколайович Платонов
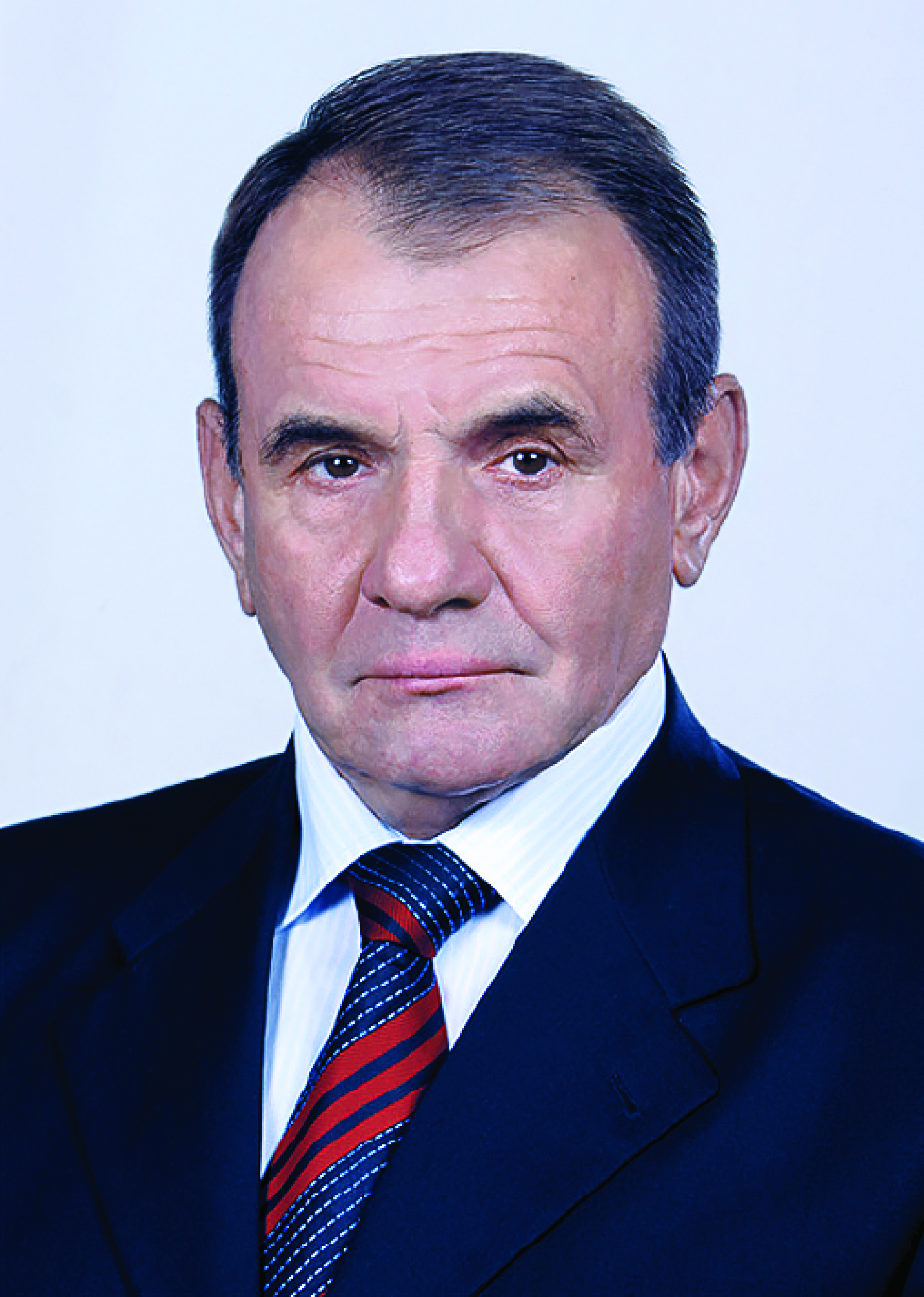
- Vladimir Nikolaevich Platonov
- Born: 28 July 1941 (age 85); Kiev, Ukrainian SSR, Soviet Union (now Kyiv, Ukraine)
- Education: Kyiv State Institute of Physical Culture
- Occupations: Sports scientist, academic
- Employer: National University of Physical Education and Sport of Ukraine
- Known for: Research in sport science and Olympic sport

Vladimir Nikolaevich Platonov (born 28 July 1941) is a Soviet and Ukrainian sports scientist and academic. He is a chief researcher at the Laboratory of Theory and Methods of Olympic Training at the Educational and Scientific Olympic Institute of the National University of Physical Education and Sport of Ukraine (NUPESU).

== Early life and education ==
Platonov graduated from the Kyiv State Institute of Physical Culture (now NUPESU) in 1962. He completed postgraduate studies from 1965 to 1968, received the degree of Candidate of Sciences in 1969, and the Doctor of Sciences (Pedagogy) in 1979.

== Career ==
From 1962 to 1965 Platonov worked as a coach. He later held academic posts including assistant and senior lecturer at the Kyiv Institute of National Economy (1969–1975), and senior fellow at the Problem Research Laboratory of High Training Loads at the Institute of Physical Culture. He headed the Department of Swimming (1975–1977) and served as vice-rector for research at the Kyiv State Institute of Physical Culture (1977–1986). In 1986 he established and led the Department of Theory of Sport (1986–1990).

He subsequently led the Department of Olympic and Professional Sport as the institute transitioned to the Ukrainian State University of Physical Education and Sport and, later, to NUPESU. In 1993 he was elected to the Ukrainian Academy of Sciences (non-governmental).

Platonov served as rector of KSIPC/USUPES/NUPESU from 1992 to 2012, a period that saw institutional reorganisation, accreditation at the highest level, and the granting of national university status in 1998.

Since 2012 he has been a professor in the Department of History and Theory of Olympic Sport and editor-in-chief of the journal Science in Olympic Sport. In 2024 he became principal researcher at the Educational and Scientific Olympic Institute of NUPESU.

== Research and professional activity ==
Platonov’s research covers the history of the Olympic movement, training systems for elite athletes, sports selection, and topics related to overtraining, injury and anti-doping. He has authored textbooks, monographs and manuals in sport science, including multi-volume works on Olympic sport and training theory.

He contributed to applied research supporting national teams, including as head of the scientific group for the Ukrainian national swimming team (1970–1988) and as a consultant to USSR national teams in swimming, cycling and handball from the mid-1970s to early 1990s.

== Publishing initiative ==
In 1994 Platonov initiated the establishment of the university press Olympic Literature (Олімпійська література).

== Honors and awards ==
=== USSR ===
- Order of the Badge of Honour (1982)
- Medal "For Labour Valour" (1988)
- Medal "For Many Years of Conscientious Work" (1990)

=== Ukraine ===
- Merited Worker of Science and Technology of the Ukrainian SSR (1990)
- Order of Merit, 3rd class (1997)
- State Prize of Ukraine in Science and Technology (1999)
- Honorary Diploma of the Verkhovna Rada of Ukraine (2005)
- Order of Prince Yaroslav the Wise, 5th class (2006)
- Order of Merit, 2nd class (2009); 1st class (2021)

=== Other countries and organisations ===
- Order of the Polar Star (Mongolia) (2011)
- Olympic Order (International Olympic Committee, 2001)
- Awards from National Olympic Committees of Kazakhstan, Armenia (2015) and Ukraine (2016).

== Honorary academic titles ==
Platonov has received honorary professorships or doctorates from institutions including the University of Zagreb (1994); Józef Piłsudski Academy of Physical Education (2003); Shanghai Institute of Physical Education (2004); National University of Physical Education and Sport of Moldova (2010); National University of Physical Education and Sports of Bucharest (2011); Mongolian National Institute of Physical Education (2011); Azerbaijan State Academy of Physical Culture and Sport (2015); and others.

== Selected publications ==
- Платонов В. Н. (1984). Теория и методика спортивной тренировки [Theory and technique of sports training] (in Russian). Kyiv: Вища школа. p. 336.
- Платонов В. Н.; Вайцеховский С. М. (1985). Тренировка пловцов высокого класса [Training of high-class swimmers] (in Russian). Moscow: Физкультура и спорт. p. 256.
- Platonov V. N.; Bulatova M. M. (1990s). Enciclopedia general del ejercicio. La preparación física (in Spanish). Barcelona: Paidotribo. p. 407.
- Платонов В. Н.; Гуськов С. И. (1994). Олимпийский спорт [Olympic sport] (in Russian). Vol. 1. Kyiv: Олимпийская литература. p. 496.
- Платонов В. Н.; Гуськов С. И. (1997). Олимпийский спорт [Olympic sport] (in Russian). Vol. 2. Kyiv: Олимпийская література. p. 384.
- Płatonow W. N. (1997). Trening wyczynowy w pływaniu: struktura i programy (in Polish). Warsaw: Resortowe Centrum Metodyczno-Szkoleniowe Kultury Fizycznej i Sportu.
- Platonov V. N.; Guskov S. I. (1997). Olympic sport. Kyiv: Olympic Literature. p. 368. ISBN 978-966-7133-06-1.
- Bulatova M. M.; Platonov V. N. (2015). Libro 5. Selección, orientación, dirección y control en el sistema de preparación de deportistas (in Spanish). Cali: Programa Editorial Universidad del Valle.
