= State Prize of Ukraine in the field of education =

State award of Ukraine

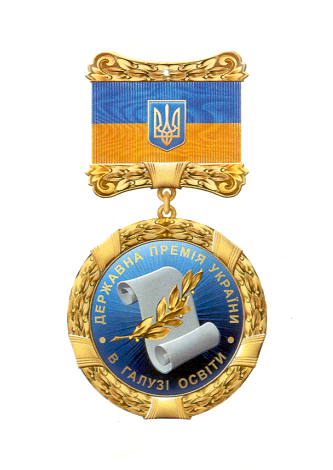
State Prize of Ukraine in the field of education

The State Prize of Ukraine in the field of education is a state award of Ukraine established to celebrate outstanding achievements in the field of education in the following categories:

- Pre-school and extracurricular education
- Secondary education
- Vocational and technical education
- Higher education
- Scientific achievements in the field of education

== Laureates ==
- Serhii Kivalov
- Vasyl Lazoryshynets
- Mykola Polyakov
- Anatoly Samoilenko
- Valerii Semenets
- Serhiy Shkarlet
- Andriy Slyusarchuk
- Mykhaylo Zagirnyak

== See also ==
- List of Ukrainian State Prizes
