= Asya Kolchynska =

Ukrainian scientist

Asya Zelikivna Kolchynska (Ukrainian: Ася Зеліківна Колчинська; July 4, 1918 – 2010) was a Ukrainian pathophysiologist, Doctor of medical sciences (1964), and Professor (1976). Laureate of the State Prize of Ukraine in Science and Technology (2000).

== Early life and education ==
Asya Kolchynska was born in 1918 in Kyiv in the family of an employee. She graduated with honors in 1940 from the Faculty of Biology of the University of Kyiv, and entered the graduate school of the Institute of Botany of the USSR Academy of Sciences.

== Career ==
With the beginning of the battles on the Eastern Front of the Second World War, Kolchynska moved to Omsk, where she worked at the local pedagogical institute and studied at the 2nd Moscow Medical Institute in the evacuation. Kolchynska received her diploma in Kyiv in 1946. From 1946 Kolchynska worked at the Institute of Physiology of the USSR Academy of Sciences (Kyiv). Between 1969 and 1976, she was the head of the Laboratory of Applied Physiology, and from 1976 to 1982 she was the head of the hypoxia department.

In 1982 Kolchynska transferred to the Kyiv Institute of Physical Culture. She was a professor-consultant and head of the hypoxia department of the problem laboratory.

From 1992 to 1998 Kolchynska worked at medical firms in Moscow, and from 1998 to 2006 she headed the laboratory of medical informatics of the Institute of Informatics and Regional Management of the Kabardino-Balkaria Research Center of the Russian Academy of Sciences (Nalchik).

== Scientific Research ==
Kolchynska studied hypoxia, adaptation and acclimatization, ontogenesis, extreme conditions, alpine, underwater and sports physiology, clinical pathophysiology, and mathematical modeling. The programs developed by Kolchynska and her students for the calculation of oxygen regimes and indicators of the state of the functional respiratory system have found a use for the current complex control in various sports.

== Works ==
- Oxygen deficiency and age (1964),
- Oxygen regime of the child and teenager (1973),
- Underwater medical and biological research (1976),
- Respiration and oxygen regimes of dolphins (1980),
- Secondary tissue hypoxia (1983),
- Oxygen, physical condition, efficiency (1992).
