= Tetiana Andriienko =

Ukrainian botanist

Tetiana Leonidivna Andriienko
- Андрієнко Тетяна Леонідівна
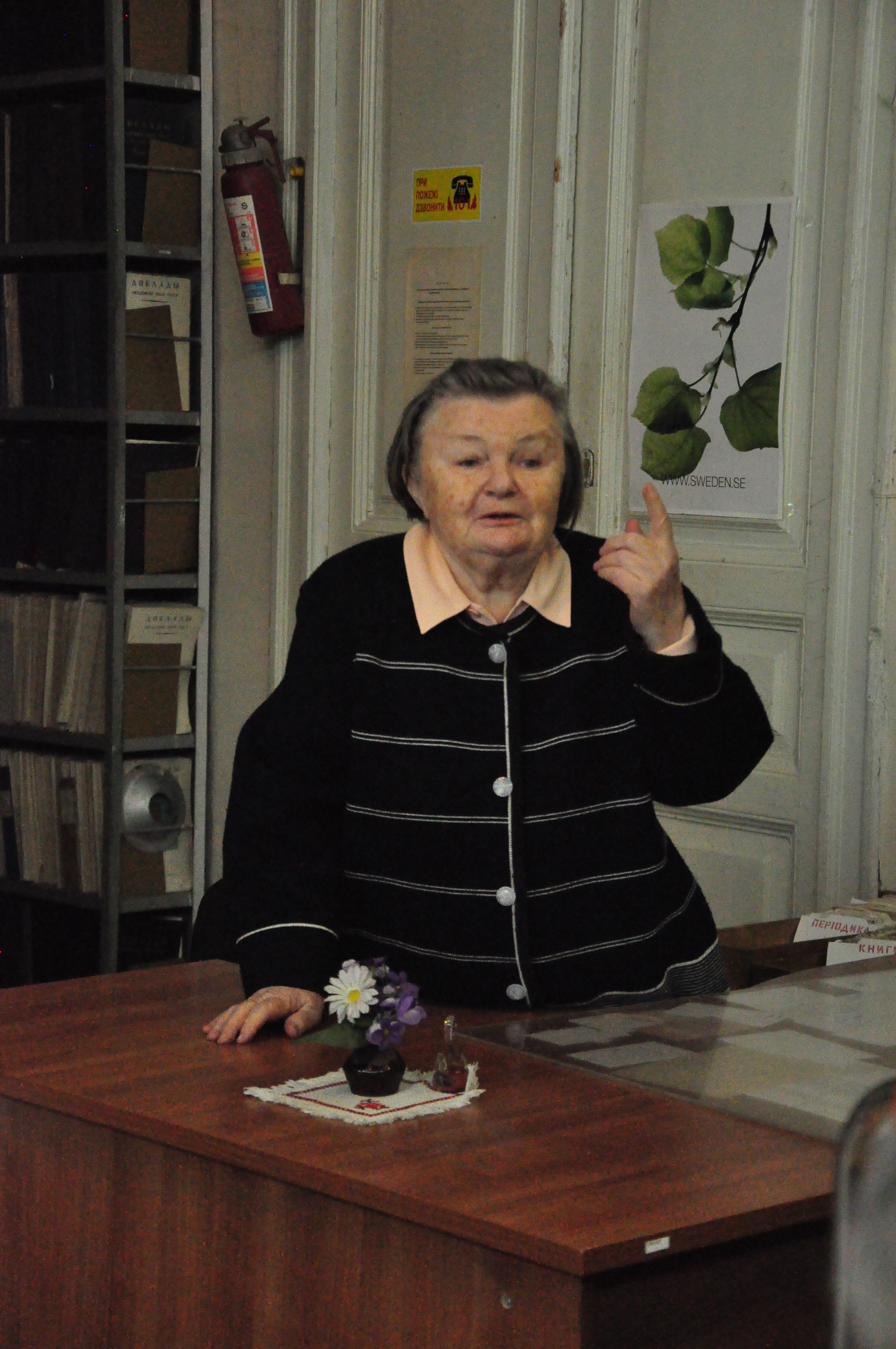
- Born: 27 December 1938; Lgov, Kursk Oblast, Union of Soviet Socialist Republics
- Died: 27 December 2016 (aged 78); Kyiv, Ukraine
- Other names: T. L. Andriienko, Tetyana Leonidivna Andrienko, Tatiana Leonidovna Andrienko
- Occupation(s): Botanist, professor, phytogeographist, floristics
- Known for: Research on vegetation of Polesia

Tetiana Leonidivna Andriienko (Ukrainian: Тетяна Леонідівна Андрієнко; 27 December 1938 – 27 December 2016) was a Ukrainian botanist, conservationist, and professor. She was known for her scientific research on the distribution of vegetation in Polesia, which in turn helped create protected wildlife areas. Andriienko was the head of the Interdepartmental Complex Laboratory of Scientific Fundamentals of Protected Areas of the National Academy of Sciences of Ukraine and the Ministry of Environmental Protection and Natural Resources Ukraine.

She was a laureate of the State Prize of Ukraine in Science and Technology (2005), was awarded the Order of Princess Olga and the Silver Leaf Medal of the European Plant Protection Organization "Plant Europe" (Uppsala, Sweden, 1998).
