= Aleksander Omelyanchuk =

Ukrainian physicist (1947–2022)

- Омельянчук Миколайович
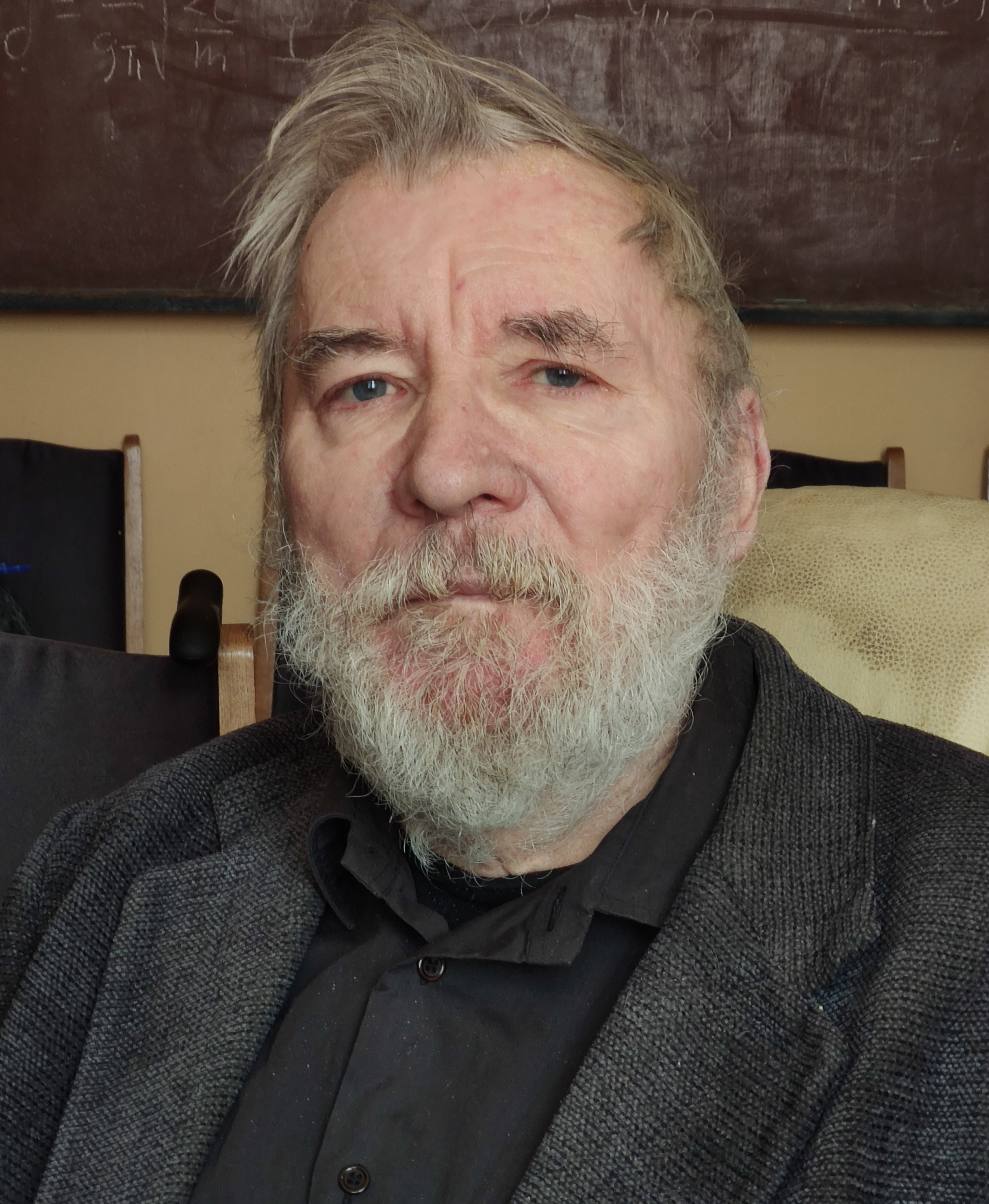
- Omelyanchuk in 2020
- Born: Aleksander Nikolaevich Omelyanchuk; 27 July 1947; Budapest, Hungary
- Died: 5 February 2022 (aged 74); Kharkiv, Ukraine
- Other names: Oleksandr Mykolayovych Omelyanchuk, Aleksander N. Omelyanchuk, A. N. Omelyanchuk
- Occupation: Physicist

Aleksander Nikolaevich Omelyanchuk (Ukrainian: Омельянчук Олександр Миколайович; 27 July 1947 – 10 February 2022) was a Hungarian-born Ukrainian physicist and academic.

== Life and career ==
Born in Budapest, Omelyanchuk graduated from the National University of Kharkiv in 1970, and from 1972 he worked as a researcher at the Verkin Institute for Low Temperature Physics and Engineering. He authored over 200 scientific papers and his researches mainly focused in the fields of spectroscopy, mesoscopic physics, quantum engineering and particularly superconductivity.

During his life Omelyanchuk was the recipient of several awards and honors, including the State Prize of Ukraine in Science and Technology and the Verkin award of the National Academy of Sciences of Ukraine for his work Theory and experimental implementation of Josephson qubits for quantum computers. He was the head of the Superconducting and Mesoscopic Structures and Devices department of the Verkin Institute for over 16 years.

== Death ==
Omelyanchuk died on 10 February 2022, at the age of 74.
