= Yuri Yampolsky =

Ukrainian astronomer (1946–2025)

- Юрій Ямпольський
- Born: Yuri Moisiyovych Yampolsky; 26 August 1946; Zaporizhzhia, Ukrainian SSR, USSR
- Died: 27 July 2025 (aged 78)
- Education: Radio Astronomy Institute of the National Academy of Sciences of Ukraine
- Occupation: Astronomer

Yuri Moisiyovych Yampolsky (Ukrainian: Юрій Моїсійович Ямпольський; 26 August 1946 – 27 July 2025) was a Ukrainian astronomer. A member of the National Academy of Sciences of Ukraine, he was a recipient of the State Prize of Ukraine in Science and Technology (2008).

Yampolsky died on 27 July 2025, at the age of 78.
