= Vasyl Moroz =

Ukrainian doctor and Hero of Ukraine recipient

Moroz Vasylʹ Maxymovych
- Born: 2 February 1942 (age 84); Ozero, Nemyriv Raion, Vinnytsia Oblast, Ukraine
- Citizenship: Soviet Union Ukraine
- Education: MD
- Alma mater: VNMU
- Occupation: Doctor
- Awards: Hero of Ukraine

Vasylʹ Maxymovych Moroz (Ukrainian: Василь Максимович Мороз) (born February 2, 1942, Ozero, Ukraine) is a Ukrainian academic.

== Life and career ==
Moroz was born on February 2, 1942, in the village of Ozera, Nemyriv district, Vinnytsia region, into a family of collective farmers.

In 1967, he graduated from Vinnytsia Medical Institute (VMI, now Vinnytsia National Medical University. N. I. Pirogov), a physician.

From 1967 to 1968 Moroz worked as a therapist at the Shpykiv District Hospital in the Vinnytsia Region.

At VMI, Moroz was an assistant professor of normal physiology (1968–69), graduate student of the same department (1969–72), associate professor (1976–84), professor (1984–91), and head of department (1991–2015). He served as academic secretary (1975–82), deputy dean of the Faculty of Medicine (1982–84), and dean of the Faculty of Pediatrics (1984–86). Having served as vice-rector for Academic Affairs from 1986 to 1988, in 1988 Moroz became the rector at Vinnytsia National Medical University. N. I. Pirogov (1988–2023).

In March 1990, Moroz joined the Vinnytsia Regional Council (Leninsky District 3, elected in the 1st round). From 1992 to 1994 he served as deputy chairman of the Vinnytsia Regional Council of People's Deputies.

== Scientific achievements ==
Moroz has authored more than 400 scientific papers, including 32 monographs and manuals and 35 inventions. His scientific research includes "Integrated function of the cerebellum of the basal ganglia and motor cortex in the programming and regulation of movements" (Institute of Physiology, ANU, 1983); "Electrophysiological studies of the representation and pathways of the auditory system in the cerebellar cortex" (Institute of Physiology, ANU, 1972).

Moroz is an honorary professor of Ternopil National Medical University.

He is the author of the creation of the system virtual patient SKIF - a computer model of the human body (2013) and author or co-author of more than 225 scientific papers.

== Awards ==
- The title of Hero of Ukraine with the Order of the State (August 21, 2003) — for outstanding personal services to the Ukrainian state in training highly qualified health care professionals, many years of fruitful scientific, pedagogical and social activities
- Order of Prince Yaroslav the Wise Fourth Class. (May 18, 2017) — for a significant personal contribution to the development of domestic science, strengthening the scientific and technical potential of Ukraine, many years of hard work and high professionalism
- Order of Prince Yaroslav the Wise Fifth Class. (2002)
- Order of Merit III degree (February 4, 1997) — for a significant personal contribution to the training of highly qualified specialists, many years of fruitful pedagogical and scientific activities
- Honored Worker of Science and Technology of Ukraine (1993)
- State Prize of Ukraine in Science and Technology in 2016 — for the work "Creation of tools and technologies for efferent therapy based on nanosilica" (as part of the team)
- Diploma of the Verkhovna Rada of Ukraine (2003)
- Diploma of the Cabinet of Ministers of Ukraine (January 29, 2002) — for many years of conscientious work, significant personal contribution to the development of medical science and education, training of highly qualified specialists and on the occasion of the 60th anniversary of his birth
