= Olena Parkhomchuk =

Ukrainian political scientist

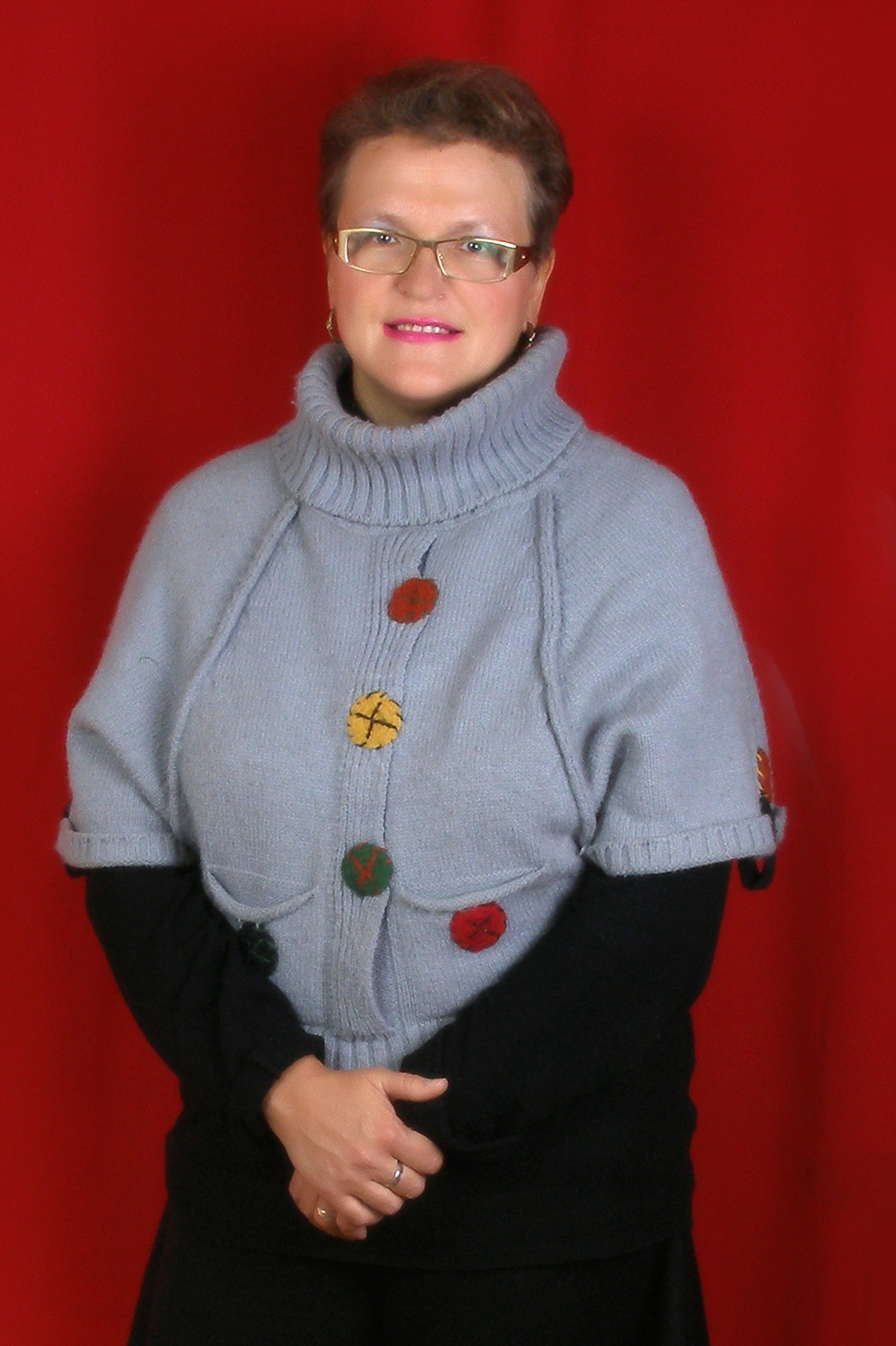
- Education: Taras Shevchenko National University of Kyiv
- Awards: State Prize of Ukraine in Science and Technology
- Scientific career
- Fields: Political science
- Workplaces: Taras Shevchenko National University of Kyiv; University of Hull

Olena Parkhomchuk (Ukrainian: Пархомчук Олена Станіславівна, also written as Yelena Parkhomchuk or Elena Parkhomchuk) is a Ukrainian political scientist. She is a professor in the Department of International Relations and Foreign Policy within the Institute of International Relations at the Taras Shevchenko National University of Kyiv. Olena Parkhomchuk studies foreign policy and the historical development of international systems, process of disarmament and conversion. She is a laureate of the State Prize of Ukraine in Science and Technology.

== Career ==
Olena Parkhomchuk attended the Taras Shevchenko National University of Kyiv, graduating in 1988 from the Faculty of Romano-Germanic studies. She continued to study there as a graduate student, graduating with a PhD from the Faculty of International Relations and Foreign Policy in 1992. In 2006, she defended a doctoral dissertation in political sciences. Olena Parkhomchuk then became a professor at the Taras Shevchenko National University of Kyiv. In 2001, she spent a semester conducting research at The University of Hull.

In 2001, Olena Parkhomchuk was a coauthor on the textbook International relations and foreign policy 1980-2000. She was also the author of the 2007 book Systems of international relations.

Together with Olena Koppel, another Taras Shevchenko professor of International Relations and Foreign Policy, Olena Parkhomchuk wrote the 1999 textbook International relations of the twentieth century. This text covers the creation of the Versailles-Washington System of international relations, its collapse after World War II, and international relations during and after The Cold War. Olena Parkhomchuk also coauthored the 2010 textbook International relations and world politics.

For her contributions to the 2008 textbook series World politics and global development, Olena Parkhomchuk was named a 2012 laureate of the State Prize of Ukraine in the Field of Science and Technology.

== Selected works ==
- International relations and foreign policy 1980-2000, coauthor (2001)
- Systems of international relations (2007)
- International relations of the twentieth century, with Olena Koppel (2009)
- International relations and world politics (2010)

== Selected awards ==
- State Prize of Ukraine in the Field of Science and Technology (uk) (2012)
