= Roman Gladyshevskii =

Ukrainian chemist

- Роман Євгенович Гладишевський
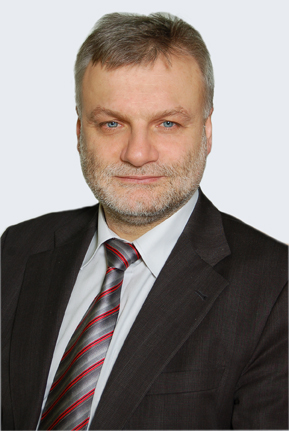

Rector of the University of Lviv

Academician of the National Academy of Sciences of Ukraine, Doctor of Chemistry, Professor
- Incumbent
- Assumed office 20 June 2025
- Preceded by: Volodymyr Melnyk

Personal details
- Born: 19 September 1958 (age 67)
- Occupation: Scientist

Roman Gladyshevskii (Ukrainian: Роман Євгенович Гладишевський) is a Ukrainian chemist, academician of the National Academy of Sciences of Ukraine, Doctor of Chemistry, professor, vice-rector for research of University of Lviv. Since 2025 he has served as the university's rector.

== Biography ==
1980 – He graduated from the Ivan Franko State University of Lviv, Faculty of Chemistry.

1980–1981 – Engineer at the R&D Institute of Materials (Lviv), 1982-1988 – postgraduate student, Engineer, Senior Research Fellow at Lviv Polytechnic Institute.

1987 – He presented his Candidate dissertation at the Lomonosov State University of Moscow.

1988–1990 – Senior Research Fellow at Department of Semiconductor Physics at Lviv University.

1990–1997 – Research Fellow at the University of Geneva (Switzerland), Professor at the University of Savoy (France).

1997 – He started doctoral studies at the Department of Inorganic Chemistry at Lviv University. 2001 – He presented his Doctoral thesis in Lviv.

2000–2005 – He was granted the academic titles of Docent and Professor.

2006 – Chairperson of Department of Inorganic Chemistry at Lviv University and Head of Scientific School «Crystal Chemistry».

2012 – Elected Corresponding Member of the National Academy of Sciences of Ukraine in Crystal Chemistry.

Since 2014 – Vice-Rector for research of University of Lviv.

== Academic and professional service ==
Member of the Bureau of Scientific Council for Inorganic Chemistry of National Academy of Sciences of Ukraine (since 2003), Head of Committee of Crystallographers of Ukraine (since 2004), member of Expert Council for the Examination of Dissertations in Chemical Sciences of the Ministry of Education and Science of Ukraine (since 2006), member of Academic Council of Lviv University, member of the Specialized Academic Council for Chemical Sciences at Lviv University; Editor-in-Chief of International Journal «Chemistry of Metals and Alloys – Хімія металів і сплавів» (since 2008); Head of the Organizing Committee of the International Conference in Crystal Chemistry of Intermetallic Compounds (since 2002), School for Young Researchers «Diffraction Methods for Determining the Structure of Substance», Regional Competition for Pupils «Crystals»; IUCr member, NTSh (Shevchenko Scientific Society) member.

In 2008, he became the laureate of the State Prize of Ukraine in Science and Technology; he also received ICDD awards (USA, 2008-2012).

== Selected publications ==
- E. Parthé, L. Gelato, B. Chabot, M. Penzo, K. Cenzual, R. Gladyshevskii. TYPIX Standardized Data and Crystal Chemical Characterization of Inorganic Structure Types. Gmelin Handbook of Inorganic and Organometallic Chemistry. Berlin: Springer-Verlag, 1993, 1994, Vol. 1-4, 1596 p.
- R.E. Gladyshevskii, K. Cenzual. Crystal Structures of Classical Superconductors. In: Handbook of Superconductivity, Ed. Ch.P. Poole, Jr. San Diego: Academic Press, 2000, Ch. 6, p. 109—250.
- R.E. Gladyshevskii, Ph. Galez. Crystal Structures of High-Tc Superconducting Cuprates. In: Handbook of Superconductivity, Ed. Ch.P. Poole, Jr. San Diego: Academic Press, 2000, Ch. 8, p. 267—431.
- R. Gladyshevskii. X-ray Studies: Chemical Crystallography. In: Handbook of Superconducting Materials. Eds. D.A. Cardwell, D.A. Ginley. Bristol: Institute of Physics Publishing, 2003, p. 1081—1099.
- R. Gladyshevskii, N. Musolino, R. Flükiger. Structural Origin of the Low Superconducting Anisotropy of Bi1.7Pb0.4Sr2Ca0.9Cu2O8. Phys. Rev. B, 2004, Vol. 70, 184522, 8 p.
- J. Daams, R. Gladyshevskii, O. Shcherban, V. Dubenskyy, V. Kuprysyuk, N. Melnichenko-Koblyuk, O. Pavlyuk, I. Savysyuk, S. Stoyko, L. Sysa, R. Zaremba. Crystal Structures of Inorganic Compounds. Landolt-Börnstein III/43 (A: Structure Types, Part 1-11: Space Groups (230) Ia-3d — (123) P4/mmm), Eds. P. Villars, K. Cenzual. Berlin: Springer-Verlag, 2004—2012, 5688 p.
- P. Villars, K. Cenzual, R. Gladyshevskii. Handbook of Inorganic Substances. Berlin: Walter de Gruyter, 2013—2016, 1877 p.
- R.E. Gladyshevskii. Methods to Determine Crystal Structures. Textbook. Lviv, 2007—2015, 135 p.
