= Prize of the Cabinet of Ministers of Ukraine for the development and implementation of innovative technologies =

The Prize of the Cabinet of Ministers of Ukraine for the development and implementation of innovative technologies is awarded annually for special achievements in the development and implementation of innovative technologies in the production and marketing of domestic innovative products. The award was launched in 2012.

The Cabinet of Ministers of Ukraine awards five Prizes annually in science.

The amount of the Prize is determined annually by the Cabinet of Ministers of Ukraine. In 2014, the amount of the award was ₴180,000 each.

== Laureates ==
- Borys Grynyov
- Vasyl Lazoryshynets
- Mykhaylo Zagirnyak
