= Volodymyr Morhun =

Ukrainian biologist (1938–2025)

- Володимир Моргун
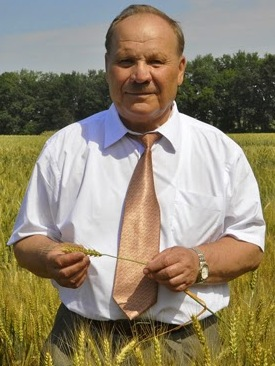
- Morhun in 2012
- Born: Volodymyr Vasylovych Morhun; 10 March 1938; Chyhyryn Raion, Kyiv Oblast, Ukrainian SSR, USSR
- Died: 16 September 2025 (aged 87)
- Education: National University of Life and Environmental Sciences of Ukraine
- Occupation: Biologist

Volodymyr Vasylovych Morhun (Ukrainian: Володимир Васильович Моргун; 10 March 1938 – 16 September 2025) was a Ukrainian biologist. A member of the National Academy of Sciences of Ukraine, he was a recipient of the State Prize of Ukraine in Science and Technology (1982).

Morhun died on 16 September 2025, at the age of 87.
