= Borys Grynyov =

- Born: 1 April 1956 (age 70)
- Education: V. N. Karazin Kharkiv National University
- Scientific career
- Fields: Solid State Physics
- Workplaces: Institute for Single Crystals; Institute for Scintillation Materials State Fund for Fundamental Research of Ukraine

Borys Viktorovych Grynyov (Ukrainian: Борис Вікторович Гриньов) (born 1 April 1956 in Kharkiv, Ukraine) is a Ukrainian scientist, public figure, member of the National Academy of Sciences of Ukraine (NAS), Honored Science Worker of Ukraine, Doctor of Engineering Science, Professor. He is the Director of the Institute for Scintillation Materials.

== Biography ==
Borys Grynyov was born on 1 April 1956 in Kharkiv. Ukrainian, member of the National Academy of Sciences of Ukraine, Doctor of Engineering Science, Professor.

Borys Grynyov obtained a Specialist degree in Physics from Kharkiv University in 1978.

He obtained his Candidate Dissertation in Physics and Mathematics in 1985 from Donetsk National University under the supervision of Volodymyr Semynozhenko, “On the theory of the normal and ferromagnetic superconductors in the strong electromagnetic fields”.

In 1978–1987 he was a student and junior research worker in O.M. Gorky Kharkiv State University, Senior geophysical worker, sector manager in Tyumen Special Design and Technology Bureau with Research Production by “ZahSibNaftoGeoFizika” Department of Ministry of Oil Industry of the USSR.

In 1987 he started working at the Institute for Single Crystals (ISC) in Kharkiv, Ukraine. There he completed his Doctoral Dissertation in Technical Sciences on the subject of “Ionization detectors for extreme conditions” in 1994.

From 1996 to December 2002 he was Director of the Institute for Single Crystals (ISC) - General director of Scientific &Technology Concern «Institute for Single Crystals» NAS of Ukraine.

He became Corresponding-member of National Academy of Sciences of Ukraine in 1997.

In 1997–1999 he was Deputy Minister for Science and Technology, First Deputy Head of the State Committee for Science & Intellectual Properties.

In 1998 was conferred on title of Honoured Scientist and Technician of Ukraine, he was awarded the Professor degree.

In 1998–2000 he was a member of National Ukrainian Committee in cases UNESCO.

In December 2002 he created the Institute for Scintillation Materials within the structure of the NAS of Ukraine and was its director from 2002 to 2011.

In 2006 became the Member (Academician) of National Academy of Sciences of Ukraine.

Since 2007 he has been the Head of Department of Crystal Physics at Kharkiv National University.

From 2010 till 2015 was a member of Presidium of National Academy of Sciences of Ukraine.

From April, 2010 he is the Scientific Director of Institute for Scintillation Materials NAS of Ukraine.

From April till July, 2010 he was the Chairman of State Committee Scientific and Technical Progress and Innovations of Ukraine.

B. Grynyov was a member of Committee of Ukraine State Prizes for Science and Technology in 2010–2015.

From 1997 to 2003 and since 2010 until 2022, he represented Ukraine in the Joint Institute for Nuclear Research (JINR) in Dubna, Russia. Since 2008 - 2022 he was a Member of the JINR Scientific Council.

From 2011 to 2014 he was the First Deputy Head of the State Agency on Science, Innovation and Informatization of Ukraine.

Since 2014 until 2017 he was the Director of State Fund for Fundamental Research of Ukraine.

Since March 2017 representative of Ukraine to the CERN Council (Canton of Geneva, Switzerland)

Since 2017 until present he is a Director of the Institute for Scintillation Materials NAS of Ukraine

== Scientific priorities ==
The scientific activities (Present)

The interaction processes of electromagnetic radiation with condensed matter. Ceramic composite, single-crystal, film, liquid and plastic materials for various functional purposes. Scintillation Materials, luminescence, radiation instrumentation.

R&D head

Methods’ development of the organization scintillation properties for single crystals on the basis of rare earth oxides. Elaboration and receiving low-background scintillation materials for double β-decay and dark matter researching

== Scientific activities (History) ==
The main directions of scientific activities of Boris Grinyov are such as: the fundamental properties of scintillation materials studying, searching for new scintillators, instruments and devices developing based on new scintillators for applications in various fields. B. Grynyov's works to a large extent, determine the level of modern world technologies for the production and processing of scintillation and luminescent materials.

Research conducted by B. Grinyov enabled to develop industrial automated technology of growing the large highly transparent optical crystal with a diameter up to 600 mm, ideal scintillation single crystals of up to 520 mm in diameter and weighing more than 500 kg. For the high-energy physics experiments the production technology of plastic scintillators were developed with weighing up to 1,000 kg with a high bulk transparency (up to 4 m), scintillator plates of up to 3.7 m, unique scintillation strips and combined complex shape detectors.

On the initiative and under the direction of B. Grinyov the production of very pure single crystals of salts was organized in Ukraine. And this production provided a stable export of high technology products such as scintillators based on alkali metal halides. He also directs the research which purpose is to search for new scintillation materials for experiments to search for "dark matter" and the double β-decay.

In recent years under the B. Grinyov's direction there were invented a number of new scintillator materials, which can find its application in the basis of new experiments in high-energy physics.

Given the intensification of the fight against international terrorism and the unauthorized movement of radioactive materials and goods, extreme urgency acquire developed a new organic and inorganic scintillators and processes for their preparation. Custom introscopic systems and installations which the European Union are producing now are equipped by Ukrainian scintillators.

Thanks to B. Grynyov's scientific research in Ukraine in the 2000s was founded the such new direction of Instrument engineering as production of nuclear medical equipment.

In the period of 1997-2003 and from 2010 to 2022 B. Grynyov was Plenipotentiary Representative of Ukraine in the Joint Institute for Nuclear Research (JINR) in Dubna, Russia. In 2008 he was elected a Member of the JINR Scientific Council (quit since 2022).

Since 2007 he has been the Head of Department of Crystal Physics at Kharkiv National University.

B.Grynyov included in the 30 most cited scientists in Ukraine (according to the Scopus , Google Score ).

== Scientific works ==
Professor B.V. Grynyov actively engaged in scientific and pedagogical activity.

Since 2007 he has been the Head of Department of Crystal Physics at Kharkiv National University.

He published 7 scientific manuals, textbooks for high school: "High algebra" (2003) (ISBN 978-966-8319-91-4); "Vector algebra" (2003) (ISBN 978-966-8319-90-7); "Analytic geometry" (2003) (ISBN 978-966-8319-92-1).

He is the initiator of the creation of a new scientific journal "Functional Materials" (print: ISSN 1027-5495); online: ISSN 2218-2993).

There are 34 monographs, over 1400 scientific works, 178 inventions, some of which are patented abroad among B. Grynyov's scientific works. 8 PhD and 9 Doctoral Dissertation were made under his scientific supervision.

== Organizational, scientific and social activities ==
- Member of European Association of Nuclear Medicine since 1997.
- Member of the US Institute of Electrical and Electronics Engineers since 2000.
- Member of the Interagency Council on Scientific Instrumentation.
- Member of the Coordinating Scientific and Technical Council of the State Target Scientific and Scientific and Technical Program by the introduction and application of Grid technologies in 2009–2013.
- Member of the Scientific and Technical Council of the Target Complex Program of NAS of Ukraine "Astroparticle Physics" in 2010–2012.
- Member of the National Assembly of the Target Complex Program of NAS of Ukraine "Fundamental Problems of nanoconstructions systems, nanomaterials and nanotechnologies”.
- Member of the Kharkiv Regional Public Humanitarian Council.
- The chief editor of the scientific and technical monographic book series "Functional materials for science and technology. State and perspectives of development ".
- Member of editorial boards of scientific journals such as "Functional Materials," "The issue of nuclear science and technology", "Science and Innovation", "Svіtoglyad".

== Honors and awards ==
In 1996 Borys Grynyov was one of the recipients of the National Award of Ukraine in Science and Technology for “Development of technology for industrial production of large scintillation crystals for various applications”.

He was conferred on title of Honored Scientist and Technician of Ukraine in 1998.

He was awarded an Order of Merit of the third degree in 2006, and the second degree in 2009, and the first degree in 2013.

In 2002 B. Grynyov was awarded Ukrainian Cabinet of Ministers’ Charter.

He was awarded The First Award of Joint Institute for Nuclear Research in 2006.

He received the G. V. Kurdyumov award of the NAS of Ukraine in 2004 and its V. I. Trefilov Award in 2009.

In 2008 he was awarded the Honorary Doctorate of Science by Hanyang University (Seoul, South Korea) for his contribution in establishing scientific and technical cooperation between Ukraine and South Korea.

B. Grynyov was awarded the Friendship order of Russian Federation in 2011 (returned).

In 2016 he was awarded as Honorary Doctorate of Science of V.N. Karazin Kharkiv National University (Kharkiv, Ukraine).

In 2016 Borys Grynyov was one of the recipients of the Prize of the Cabinet of Ministers of Ukraine for the development and implementation of innovative technologies for "Development and implementation of advanced technologies for creating sophisticated detector modules based on key high-tech components with aluminum switching systems for detecting particles in high energy physics experiments". In 2025 Borys Grynyov received the international prize "Breakthrough Prize in Fundamental Physics".

Awarded the Medal of Prince Yaroslav the Wise V degree (2017), IV degree (2021), III degree (2026).

== Private life ==
Married, has two daughters.

== Interests ==
One of the main Borys Grynyov's hobbies is collection of works of Ukrainian art. Boris Grinyov collection includes 15 well-known collections "Modern Art of Ukraine".

In 2004 in connection with the 150th anniversary of the famous artist S.I. Vasilkivskiy the action "On Vasilkivskiy ways: a look through the ages" was organized. The purpose of the action was to reproduce after 100 years the sights of the church and folk art, characteristic landscapes created in the time this master. For this purpose, it has been investigated S.I. Vasilkivskiy "geography" trips as works that are in the collection of the Kharkiv Art Museum, and in the pre-war documents that recorded the lost works of the artist (about 700).

Under the editorship of B.V. Grynyov was compiled reference book "The signatures and monograms of artists of Ukraine", which has been reprinted three times. The reference book contains a brief biographical information on contemporary Ukrainian artists and samples of their signatures. Ordering of such material is widely used throughout the world, and its necessity has been long overdue in Ukraine.
