= Oleksandr Ryzhenkov =

Ukrainian economist and politician (born 1950)

Hero of Ukraine Oleksandr Ryzhenkov OS
- Олександр Риженков
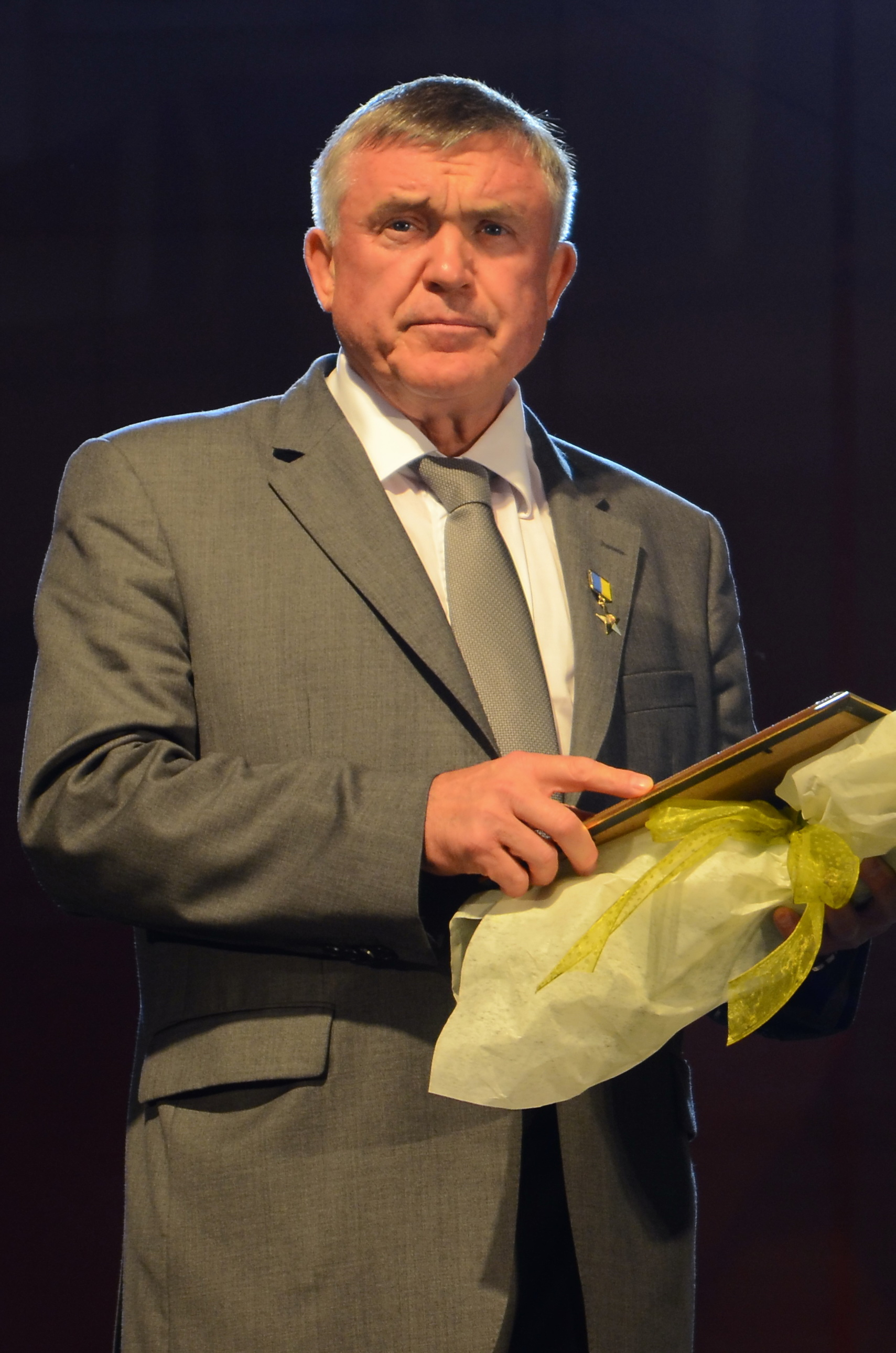
- Ryzhenkov in 2012

People's Deputy of Ukraine
- In office 10 November 2012 – 27 November 2014
- Preceded by: Constituency established
- Succeeded by: Dmytro Lubinets
- Constituency: Donetsk Oblast, No. 60

Personal details
- Born: 5 June 1950 (age 76) Stalino, USSR (now Donetsk, Ukraine)
- Party: Party of Regions
- Children: 3
- Education: Donetsk National Technical University
- Occupation: Metallurgist; economist; politician
- Awards: Hero of Ukraine

Oleksandr Mykolaiovych Ryzhenkov (Ukrainian: Олександр Миколайович Риженков; born 5 June 1950) is a Ukrainian metallurgist, economist and politician who is a recipient of the Hero of Ukraine, Order of Prince Yaroslav the Wise and Order of Merit. Additionally, he was a member of the 7th Ukrainian Verkhovna Rada from 2012 to 2014.

== Early life and education ==
Born on 5 June 1950, in the Ukrainian city of Stalino (now Donetsk). He received a degree in metalworking from Donetsk Polytechnic Institute (now Donetsk National Technical University) in 1972.

== Career ==
Ryzhenkov worked for the Donetsk Metallurgical Plant from 1972 to 1980. Ryzhenkov went on to serve in the political and governing bodies of the Leninsky district of Donetsk from 1980 to 1994. He became the Donetsk Metallurgical Plant's general director in 1994 and remained there until 1996. Later, in 1996, he moved to the position of chair of the executive committee of open joint-stock company Donetsk Metallurgical Plant, which he has held ever since.

His leadership grew even further when he was appointed head of the board and then the general girector of the Metallurgical Plant of PJSC Donetskstal from December 1994 and November 2012. He has been the president of the metallurgical facility at PJSC Donetskstal since November 2012. In addition to his corporate positions, Ryzhenkov was elected as a People's Deputy of Ukraine in October 2012, and took office on 10 November. On 25 December 2012, he assumed leadership of the Verkhovna Rada of Ukraine's Committee on Finance and Banking, substantially expanding his power.

Based on the Donetsk Metallurgical Plant's property and open-hearth shops, PJSC Donetskstal was founded in October 2002. Under Ryzhenkov's leadership, it focuses on the following: construction supplies, iron-containing goods, slag items, and limestone manufacturing products; carbon, structural, low-alloy steel; church bells created from colored high-quality alloy.

== Personal life ==
Ryzhenkov is married and has three children. One of his son is Yuriy Ryzhenkov, the CEO of Metinvest Holding.

Oleh Liashko, the head of the Radical Party, announced on 2 August 2018, that he had made 16 million hryvnias from the selling of a property to Ryzhenkov. Ukrainska Pravda wrote this in reaction to Liashko's press statement. They did not say which flat was sold by Liashko.

== Awards and recognitions ==
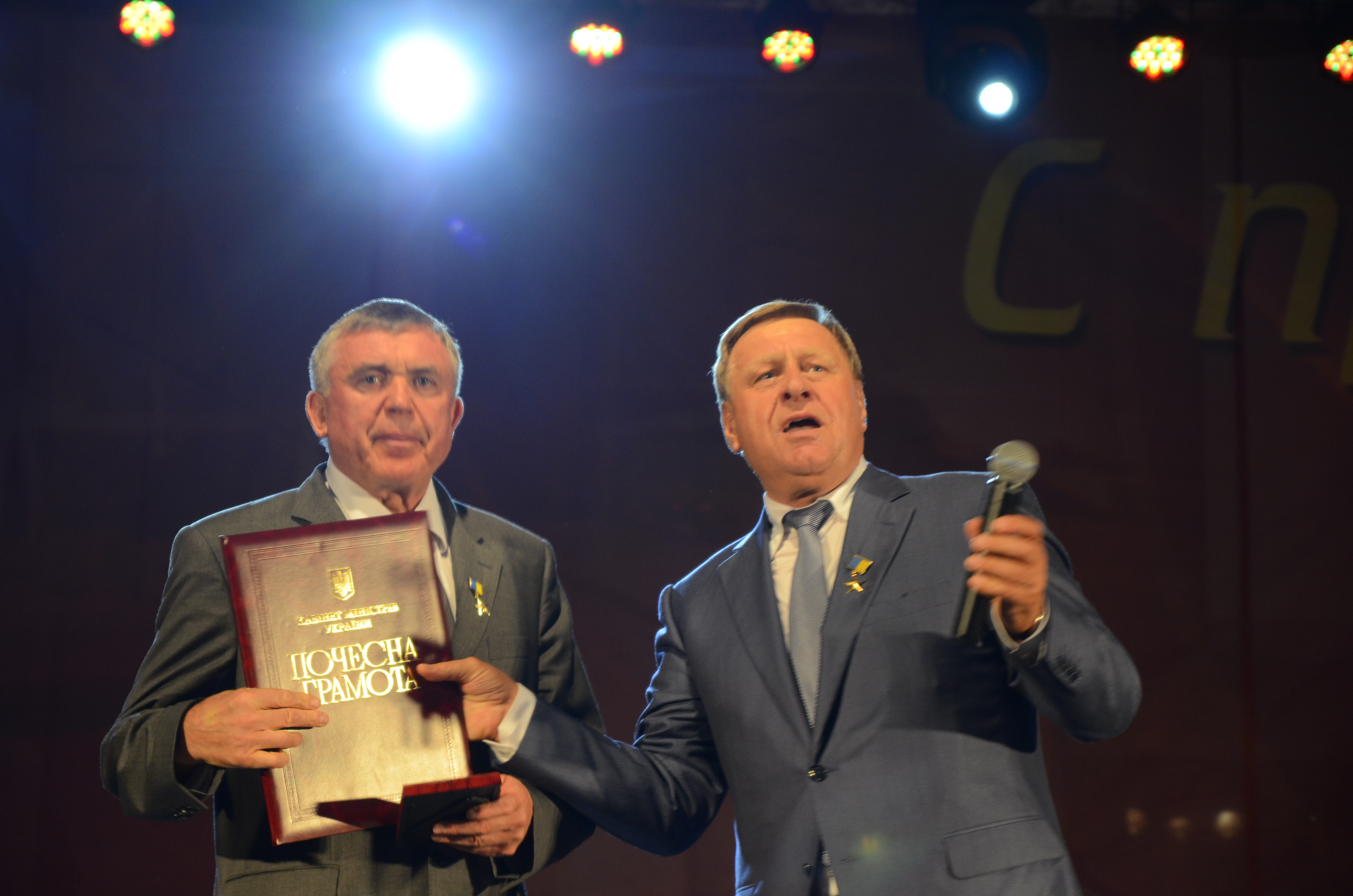
Rizhenkov and Valentyn Landyk during Metallurgist's Day 2012

Based on the TOP-100 list of the top 100 managers in Ukraine, Ryzhenkov was named one of the best managers in 2009. In 2010, he was named a Hero of Ukraine Order of the State for his exceptional individual contribution to developing Ukraine's industrial possibilities, producing competitive metallurgical products, and introducing incredibly effective kinds of leadership through years of selfless work. He received the State Prize of Ukraine in Science and Technology for the creation and use of technological cycles that produce economical metal goods using a complex system of furnaces and constant casting machinery.

Anatoliy has received awards and recognitions such as:

- Hero of Ukraine Order of the State (21 August 2010)
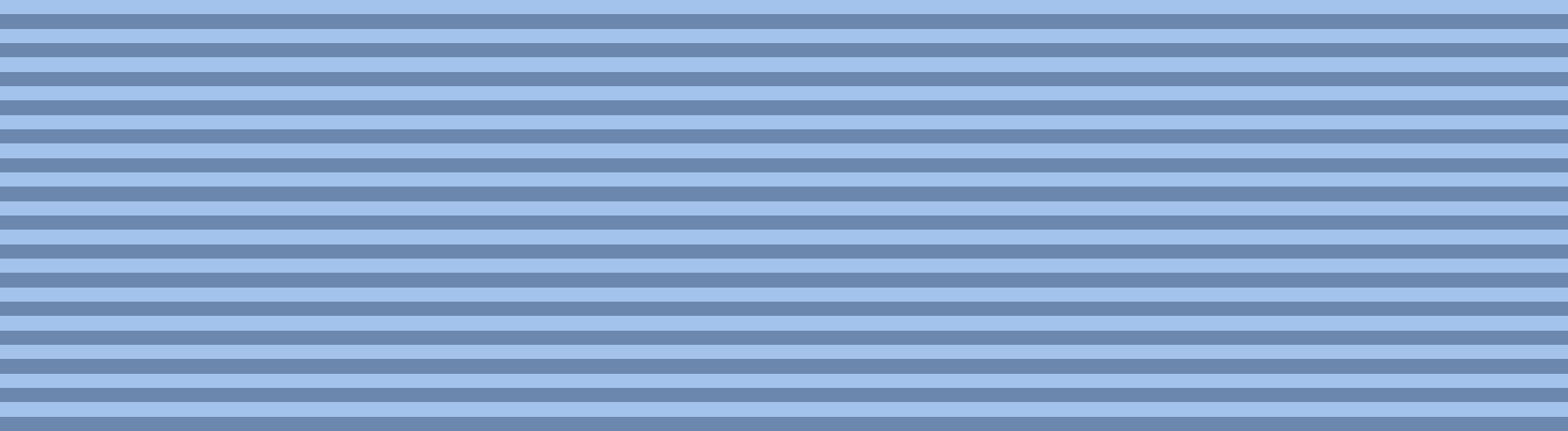
- Order of Prince Yaroslav the Wise Fifth Class (16 January 2009)
- Order of Merit First Class (22 June 2007)
- Order of Merit Second Class (23 August 2005)
- Order of Merit Third Class (21 August 2001)
- 20 Years of Independence of Ukraine Medal (19 August 2011)
- State Prize of Ukraine in Science and Technology (16 December 2002)
- Honored Worker of Industry of Ukraine (25 July 1997)
