= Mykhailo Lysytsa =

Ukrainian physicist

Mykhailo Pavlovych Lysytsa (Ukrainian: Михайло Павлович Лисиця; 15 January 1921, Vysoke – 10 January 2012, Kyiv) was a Soviet and Ukrainian physicist in the field of optics and spectroscopy, nonlinear optics and quantum electronics, solid-state physics and semiconductor physics. He was academician of the National Academy of Sciences of Ukraine (elected on 1 April 1982), Doctor of Physical and Mathematical Sciences (1961), professor. He was awarded two State Prizes of Ukraine in Science and Technology.

The asteroid 8064 Lisitsa was named after him.

== Research ==
At the beginning of his scientific career at Taras Shevchenko National University of Kyiv, he achieved first results in optics of thin metal layers, spectroscopy of organic liquids, and the creation of infrared radiation polarizers. Together with his students and postgraduates, he started research on semiconductor optics, which, since 1961, after his transition to the newly organized Academic Institute of Semiconductors, it became one of the main directions of his work. Lysytsa was one of the first among Ukrainian opticians to address the issues of laser physics and nonlinear optics in the early 1960s. Later, he became one the first among Ukrainian scientists to focus on fiber optics and co-authored with his students monograph on "Fiber Optics," which was soon translated into English.

== Selected works ==
- Fibre Optics. K., 1968 (English: New York; Jerusalem; London, 1972);
- Fermi Resonance. K., 1984;
- Lasers in Science and Technology. K., 1986;
- Optical recharging of impurity in semiconductors. K., 1992;
- Solid-state optical filters on gyrotropic crystals. K., 1998;
- Intriguing optics. К., 2002. Т. 1.
- Atmospheric and space optics; 2003. Т. 2.
- Physiological optics.
- The human world; 2006. Т. 3.
- Physiological optics.
- Animal world; 2008. Т. 4.
- Bioluminescence; 2012. Т. 5.
- Fibre optics
