= Georgii Chornyi =

Ukrainian aeronautical engineer

- Чорний Георгій Петрович
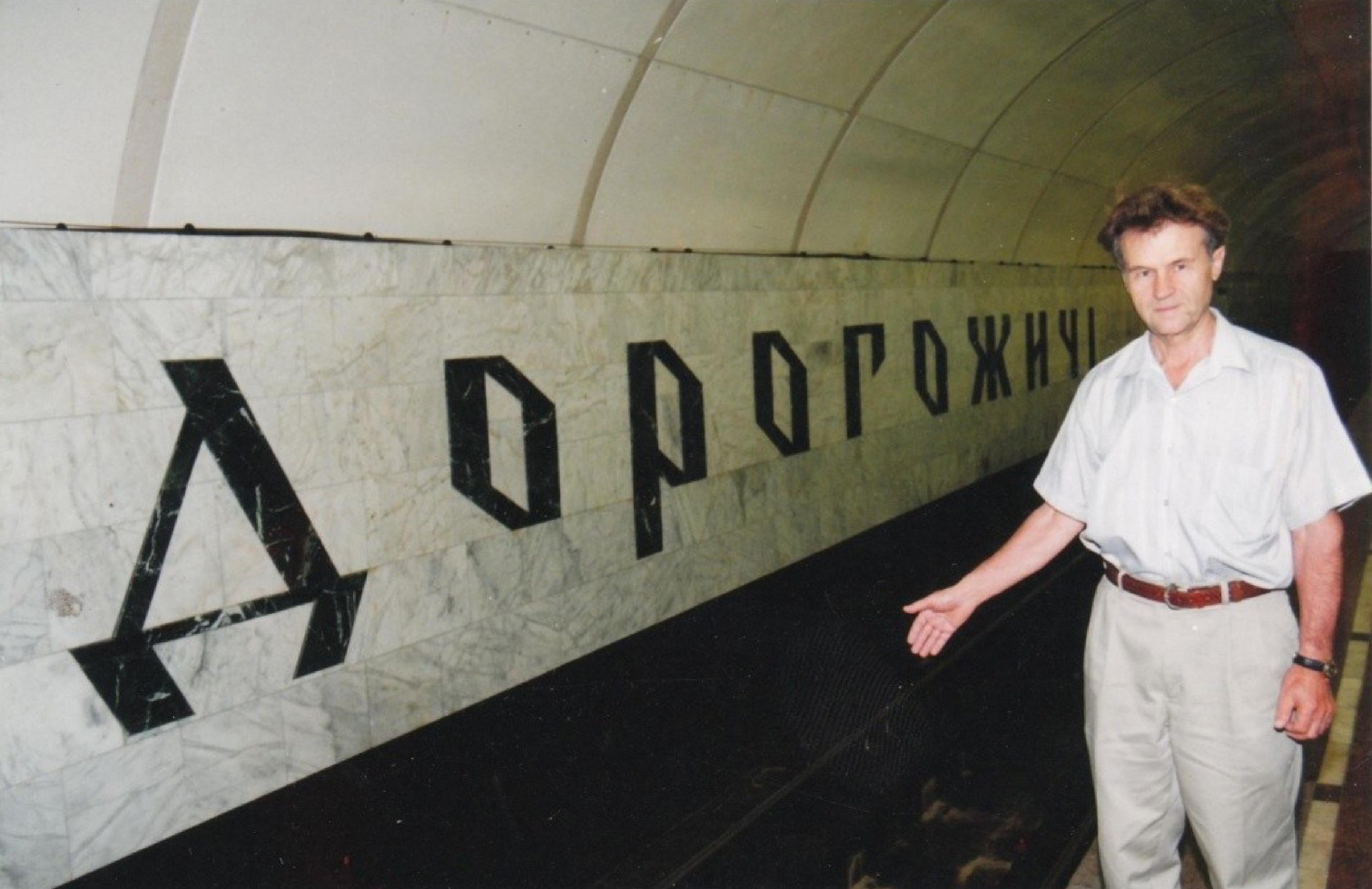
- Born: September 14, 1937 (age 88); Dubovi Hriady village, Sakhnovshchina district, Kharkiv region
- Citizenship: Ukraine
- Education: Kharkiv Aviation Institute of the name of N.Y.Zhukovskyi

Geόrgii Chόrnyi (Ukrainian: Чорний Георгій Петрович; born September 14, 1937, in Ukraine) is a Ukrainian aeronautical engineer who was awarded a State Prize of Ukraine in Science and Technology in 2018. He has also written a history of early Ukraine, and received the Mykhailo Chabanivskyi Ukrainian literary Prize in 2015.

== Early life ==
Geόrgii Chόrnyi (uk:Чорний Георгій Петрович) was born in a peasant family on September 14, 1937, in the Dubόvi Hriády village, on territory of the former Orilian palanka (uk:Орільська паланка) - one of 10 regions of the Сossack State of Zaporizhzhya. Evidently, his nearest ancestors were Zaporozhian Cossacks, among which the last name Chόrnyi was most common.

== Engineering and scientific activity ==
Since 1965, he has worked at the State Kyiv design bureau "Luch" (uk:Луч (конструкторське бюро)), and has written a book about it. He was awarded order "The Badge of Honour" (1982) and honorary title "Honoured Worker of Ukraine in Science and Technology" (1993) and a State Prize of Ukraine in Science and Technology (2018) for his work at the design bureau on rockets and defensive hardware. At the same time, he was associate professor in the National Aviation University (2002-2012), and published a textbook Автоматизовані системи контролю літальних апаратів, with the recommendation of Department of Education and Science of Ukraine.

== Literary and public activity ==
He has at the same time studied sources on the language, genetics, history, and culture of Ukrainians. The results of his research on linguistic-historical themes were printed in newspapers: Holos Ukrayiny, Evening Kyiv, Khreshchatyk, Ukrayina Moloda, Literary Ukraine, and others. Against the resistance of the Kyiv municipal administration, but with public support, he brought about the naming of a new metro station by the annalistic name "Dorohόzhichy", and as a result of that got from journalists the honorary title: "godfather" of the name "Dorohόzhichy". His research about early prehistoric Kyiv and the historical way of the Ukrainians became the basis for his book Київ досвітній (2014), for which he was awarded the title of laureate of the Mykhajlo Chabanivskyi Ukrainian literary Prize. The publishing house "Glagoslav Publications" (Great Britain) published his e-book Ancient Ukraine and Early Kyiv in 2016, intended for the readers in the Ukrainian diaspora.
