= Viktor Hoshkevych =

Ukrainian archaeologist, publicist, and historian

Viktor Ivanovich Hoshkevych
- Born: Гошкевич Віктор Іванович; March 7, 1860 (O.S.); March 21, 1860; Kyiv, Russian Empire (now Kyiv, Ukraine
- Died: March 2, 1928
- Citizenship: Russian Empire; USSR
- Education: Kyiv University
- Occupation: Archaeologist
- Years active: 1880-1928
- Known for: Founding the Kherson Local History Museum,
- Father: Ivan Antonovich Hoshkevych
- Relatives: Leonid Hoshkevych (brother); Mykhailo Hoshkevych (brother)

Viktor Ivanovich Hoshkevych (Uk: Гошкевич Віктор Іванович) was a Ukrainian archaeologist, publicist, and historian. Hoshkevych founded and was the first director of the Kherson Local History Museum in Kherson, Ukraine.

== Biography ==
Hoshkevych was born on March 9, 1960 (O.S., March 21, 1860) in Kyiv, Russian Empire, to the family of Ivan Antonovych Hoshkevych, a priest of the Tsarekostiantynivska Church in Podilskyi District. Hoshkevych received an education in the history department of Kyiv University. While studying, Hoshkevych worked at the astronomical observatory and was a correspondent of several Kyiv-based newspapers.

In the 1880s, he gained experience in creating museums. He was a co-founder of the Museum of the Church-Archaeological Society within Kyiv Pechersk Lavra. He later became interested in southern Ukrainian archaeology and Scythian antiquities. From 1890 he held a position as secretary of the Kherson Provincial Statistical Committee.

Between 1898 and 1907, Hoshkevych published in the journal "Yuh", where he conducted research on ancient southern Ukrainian history and on the Zaporozhian Cossacks. In 1890, he founded the first prototype of the Kherson Local History Museum. Initially, it was a museum collection at the statistical committee, but soon grew into one of the largest museums of the province and later the Russian Empire. The museum was opened on October 1, 1911.

After 1914, Hoshkevych was a corresponding member of the Moscow Archaeological Society. Between 1917 and 1920, he collected artifacts from Tsarist Russia.

Hoshkevych died on March 2, 1928, and was buried in the Old City Cemetery in Kherson. His grave is currently located on the site of the Kherson Local History Museum.

== Attitude toward Ukraine ==
Volodymyr Kedrowsky said in his memoirs that Hoshkevych was supportive of Ukrainian statehood and respected Ukrainian traditions and customs.

In Kherson and Kryvyi Rih, there are streets named after Hoshkevych.
