= Vasyl Lazoryshynets =

Ukrainian cardiac surgron (born 1957)

Ukrainian cardiac surgeon, Director of Amosov National Institute of cardiovascular surgery

Personal details
- Born: 25 May 1957 (age 69) Sokyrnytsia, Zakarpattia Oblast, Ukrainian SSR, Soviet Union
- Education: Kyiv Medical Institute. O.O. Bogomolets (now the National Medical University named after O.O. Bogomolets
- Website: amosovinstitute.org.ua

This article uses national romanization of Ukrainian.

Vasyl Lazoryshynets (Ukrainian: Василь Васильович Лазоришинець, Vasyl Vasylovych Lazoryshynets) is a Ukrainian cardiac surgeon, director of the Mykola Amosov National Institute of Cardiovascular Surgery of the National Academy of Medical Sciences of Ukraine.

== Biography ==
- In 1974 he graduated from Sokyrnytsia School with a gold medal
- In 1980 he graduated from the Kyiv Medical Institute. O.O. Bogomolets, (now the National Medical University named after O.O. Bogomolets, program subject area "General medicine"
- 1980-1982 - Doctor of the pathological department of the Chernihiv Regional Hospital
- 1984-1987 - Surgeon, vascular surgeon of Chernihiv Regional Hospital
- 1987-1989 - Clinical resident in the specialty "Cardiac Surgery" of the Kyiv Research Institute of Cardiovascular Surgery (now the Amosov National institute of cardiovascular surgery)
- 1989-1992 - Junior Research Fellow, Department of Congenital Heart Diseases, Kyiv Research Institute of Cardiovascular Surgery
- 1992-2003 - Head of the Department of Congenital Heart Disease Surgery in Children of the Institute of Cardiovascular Surgery of the Academy of Medical Sciences of Ukraine
- March - June 2003 - Deputy Director of Medical Work of the Institute of Cardiovascular Surgery of the Academy of Medical Sciences of Ukraine
- 2003-2004 - Deputy Director of Research work at the Institute of Cardiovascular Surgery of the Academy of Medical Sciences of Ukraine
- 2004-2008 - National Academy of Medical Sciences of Ukraine. Head of the medical and organizational department
- 2008-2009 - Deputy Ministry of Healthcare (Ukraine)
- 2009-2010 - First Deputy Ministry of Healthcare (Ukraine)
- 2010 - Elected Corresponding Member of the National Academy of Medical Sciences of Ukraine
- 2010 -2014 - Head of the medical and organizational department of the National Academy of Medical Sciences of Ukraine
- April 16 - October 1, 2014 - Deputy Minister of Ministry of Healthcare (Ukraine) - Head of Staff
- October 1, 2014 - December 2, 2014 - Acting Ministry of Healthcare (Ukraine)
- December 2 - December 24 - First Deputy Ministry of Healthcare (Ukraine)
- 2015 - Head of the medical and organizational department of the National Academy of Medical Sciences of Ukraine
- November 1, 2015 - appointed acting director of the National Institute of Cardiovascular Surgery. M.M. Amosov
- January 19, 2016 - elected director of the National Institute of Cardiovascular Surgery. M.M. Amosov
- May 2016 - elected academician of the National Academy of Medical Sciences of Ukraine

== Research activities ==
- 1995 - Candidate of Sciences
- 2002 - Medical doctor
- 2003 - Professor
- 2010 - Corresponding Member of the Academy of Medical Sciences of Ukraine
- 2017 - Academician. National Academy of Medical Sciences of Ukraine
- Active member of the European Association for Cardio-Thoracic Surgery
- Member of the French Association of Thoracic and Cardiovascular Surgeons
- Member of the American Association for Thoracic Surgery
- Founder and member of the World Association of Pediatric Cardiologists and Cardiac Surgeons
- Head of the Association of Cardiovascular Surgeons of Ukraine
- Head of the Specialized Academic Council for the Defense of Dissertations in the specialty 14.01.04 "Cardiovascular Surgery"

Author of more than 380 scientific papers, 13 monographs, 36 copyright certificates, and 4 guidelines. As a supervisor, he prepared 10 candidates of medical sciences. In 2019 he is the research supervisor of 4 doctoral and 5 candidate dissertations

== Social activities ==
- Co-founder of the Healthy Heart Initiative
- Head of the Board of the Association of Cardiovascular Surgeons of Ukraine
- Deputy Chairman of the Board "ALL-UKRAINIAN ASSOCIATION OF CHIEF DOCTORS"
- President of the "CITIZENS 'ASSOCIATION" SOCIETY OF Zakarpatsiv IN KYIV"

== Family ==
Married. Wife: Lazoryshynets Tetyana. He has two daughters.

== Awards ==
- Order of Prince Yaroslav the Wise. (May 18, 2017 - 4th Degree., June 11, 2007 - 5th Degree.) - for a significant personal contribution to the development of domestic science, strengthening the scientific and technical potential of Ukraine, many years of hard work and high professionalism
- Honored Medic of Ukraine (June 19, 1999) - for merits in the development of health care, the introduction of new methods of diagnosis and treatment, high professionalism
- State Prize of Ukraine in the field of science and technology in 2005 - for fundamental research on the impact of hyperthermia on the state of immunity and the development of new highly effective treatment technologies for purulent-septic diseases in cardiovascular and abdominal surgery (as part of the team)
- Prize of the Cabinet of Ministers of Ukraine for the development and implementation of innovative technologies in 2016 - for the work "Innovative approach to the organization and provision of medical care in hybrid warfare" (as part of the team)
- Laureate of the State Prize of Ukraine in the field of education (2018)
