= Oleksandra Bandura =

Soviet Ukrainian teacher and literature scholar

- Олександра Бандура
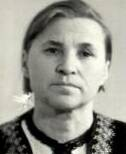
- in 1977
- Born: Oleksandra Mykhailivna Bandura; 7 November [O.S. 25 October] 1917; Hamivka, Pryazovske Raion, Zaporizhzhia Oblast, Ukrainian People's Republic
- Died: 4 September 2010 (aged 92); Kyiv, Ukraine
- Education: Taras Shevchenko National University of Kyiv
- Occupations: Teacher; Literature scholar
- Years active: 1930s–2008
- Spouse: Oleksandr Bandura
- Children: 2
- Awards: State Prize of Ukraine in Science and Technology

Oleksandra Mykhailivna Bandura (Ukrainian: Олександра Михайлівна Бандура; 7 November [O.S. 25 October] 1917 – 4 September 2010) was a Soviet Ukrainian teacher and literature scholar who worked as an educator at the Instytut pedahohiky from 1951 until 1991 and as a senior researcher at the Department of the Methodology of Teaching History of Ukraine between 1956 and 1987. She was strongly interested in the issue concerning the creation of textbooks and the problem with educating the theory of teaching literature in school, and was the author of more than 110 scientific works. Bandura was made a laureate of the State Prize of Ukraine in Science and Technology in 1977.

== Early life and education ==
On 7 November [O.S. 25 October] 1917, Bandura was born in the village of Hamivka, Pryazovske Raion (today Melitopol Raion), Zaporizhzhia Oblast, Ukraine. She had her primary education at the nearby village of Zhadran before she and her family fled to the city of Donetsk (then Stalino) due to the Holodomor, studying at the No. 10 School for seven years. When Bandura was 16 years old, she spent three months doing the pedagogical course and became a junior school teacher. She worked at Oles Honchar Dnipro National University before applying to study at the philological faculty of Taras Shevchenko National University of Kyiv. Bandura took part in the Great Patriotic War on the Eastern Front. She graduated from university in 1945.

== Career ==
After being at the Department of Ukrainian Literature of the Faculty of Philology of Kyiv University, Bandura began working at the Instytut pedahohiky from 1951 until 1991, researching the issues of teaching methods of Ukrainian in Ukrainian secondary schools. She took on advice from professor Oleksandr Doroshkevich to do methodological and scientific work. Bandura developed a strong interest in the issue concerning the creation of textbooks and the problem with educating the theory of teaching literature in school. She worked as a laboratory assistant in the Department of Ukrainian Literature Methodology, before becoming a junior assistant. In 1956, Bandura defended her Candidate of Sciences in Pedagogy thesis as a senior researcher at the Department of the Methodology of Teaching History of Ukraine, where she remained until 1987.

She was the writer of more than 110 scientific works, including 31 scientific-methodical publications, six textbooks (single and co-authored) on Ukrainian literature for grades 5, 6, 8, 9, one for classes with grade 7/8 students with an in-depth study of Ukrainian literature and one for the fifth grade of Polish-speaking schools and teacher manuals. Bandura's subjects also included study of the elements of the theory of literature, connections that developed the theory of schools and textbooks on Ukrainian letters. She partook in the preparation of programmes from Ukrainian and general education letters for schools. She emphasised the requirement for methodically competent organisation of reading works, with the importance of protecting the direct reading perception of the work by students. Bandura focused on substantiating the principals of school ideological and artistic analysis, taking into account the specifics of fiction and understanding its implementation. Bandura theorised that textbooks should give a single system of work on every problem that form the process of "studying literature in secondary school."

Bandura's works include Вивчення творчості Леоніда Глібова в школі in 1954; Василь Стефаник: Літературно-критичний нарис in 1956; Вивчення творчості Івана Котляревського в школі in 1957; Мова художнього твору in 1964; Теорія літератури in 1969; Українська література in 1970; Вивчення української літератури в 5 класі in 1972; Міжпредметні зв'язки в процесі вивчення української літератури in 1984; Вивчення елементів теорії літератури в 9—11 класах in 1989; Українська література: підручник для 9 класів гуманітарних гімназій, ліцеїв, коледжів і шкіл з поглибленим вивченням предмета in 1998; Шкільний підручник з української літератури in 2001; Наукові основи методики літератури in 2002; Українська література: підручник для 8 класу in 2005 and Теорія літератури в тезах, дефініціях, таблицях: навчальний довідник in 2008.

== Personal life ==
She was married to the publisher and translator Oleksandr Bandura until his death in 2005. They had two children. On 4 September 2010, Bandura died in Kyiv.

== Awards ==
She and Yevheniia Kucherenko were jointly awarded the State Prize of Ukraine in Science and Technology on 13 December 1977, for their work on writing the eighth edition of the textbook Ukrainian literature, 5th grade. Bandura was a recipient of the Excellence in People's Education of the Ukrainian SSR.
