= Bogomolets =

Bogomolets (Russian: Богомолец) or Bohomolets (Ukrainian: Богомолець) is the name of:

- Alexander M. Bogomolets (1850–1935), physician and revolutionary
- Alexander A. Bogomolets (Oleksandr Bohomolets; 1881–1946), Soviet-Ukrainian pathophysiologist, son of Alexander M. Bogomolets, namesake of Bogomolets National Medical University
- Lev Bogomolets (1911–2009), Soviet Russian painter
- Olga Bogomolets (Olha Bohomolets; born 1966), Ukrainian singer, songwriter and physician, a great-granddaughter of Alexander A. Bogomolets
