= Yuriy Bazhal =

Ukrainian economist

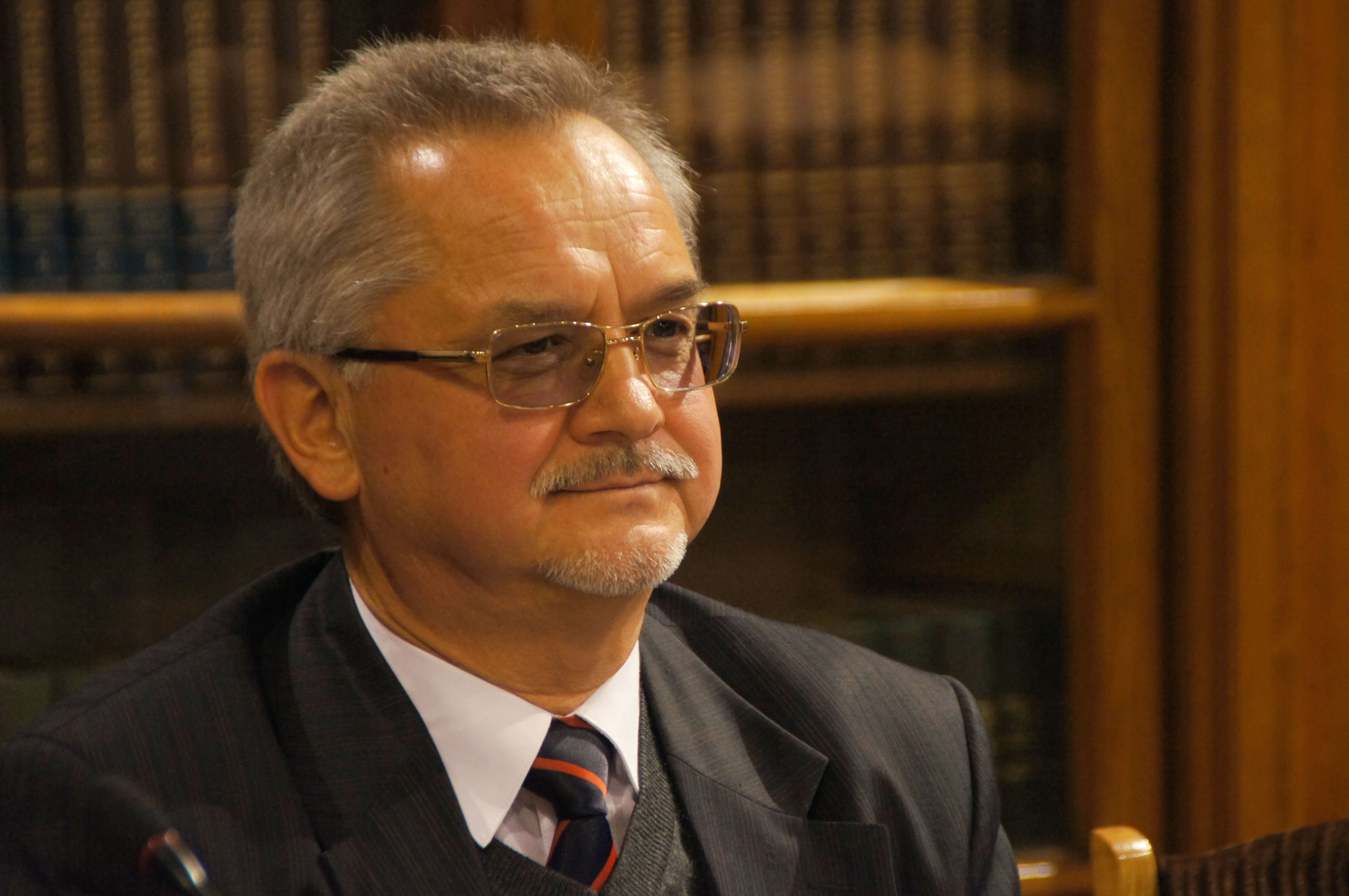
Yuriy Bazhal

Bazhal, Yuriy (Yuri, Iurii) (born November 26, 1950) is a Ukrainian scientist in a field of economic theory, innovations, and technological development; Doctor of Economic Sciences, Professor, Academic (ANVSU) from 2010.

== Biography ==
Yuriy Bazhal was born in Odessa in 1950. In 1971 he finished plan-economic faculty of Odessa State Economics University. Worked at the Economics Institute of Ukrainian Soviet Socialist Republic Academy of Sciences since 1988, and at the Institute of Economic Forecasting of National Academy of Science of Ukraine during 1997-1999. He has taught at National University of Kyiv-Mohyla Academy since 1994, from 2000 he was the head of Economic Theory Department, and in 2000-2006 he was the Dean of Faculty of Economic Sciences (Faculty of Economics).

1977 - Candidate of Economic Sciences;

1992 - Doctor of Economic Sciences;

2000 - Professor;

2010 - Academic.

He has contributed to the theory and practice of the innovations management and to the development of the state innovation policy conception.

== Scientific achievements ==
Yuriy Bazhal has over 160 publications, including 14 individually and collectively written monographes and 5 studying books, and also scientific articles in Ukrainian and foreign scientific journals.

He was awarded a medal for young scientists from the Academy of Sciences of Ukraine (1984), diploma of the Ministry of Finance of Ukraine (2004). Thrice he was awarded with Vadym Hetman professorial fellowship from Raiffeisen Bank Aval (2006–2009).
