= Institute for Scintillation Materials =

Research institute in Kharkiv, Ukraine

Institute for Scintillation Materials of NAS of Ukraine is a Ukrainian leading research centre specializing in luminescent and scintillation materials research and development and can be ranked in the top of the European and international research organizations working in the area of radiation detection.

== Main scientific directions ==
- scintillation and luminescent environment materials science;
- fundamental researches of radiation and matter interaction;
- the technologies and nano-technologies development on scintillation detectors production and production of devices on their basis.
