= Kherson Local History Museum =

Museum in Kherson, Ukraine

Coordinates: 46°37′46″N 32°36′38″E

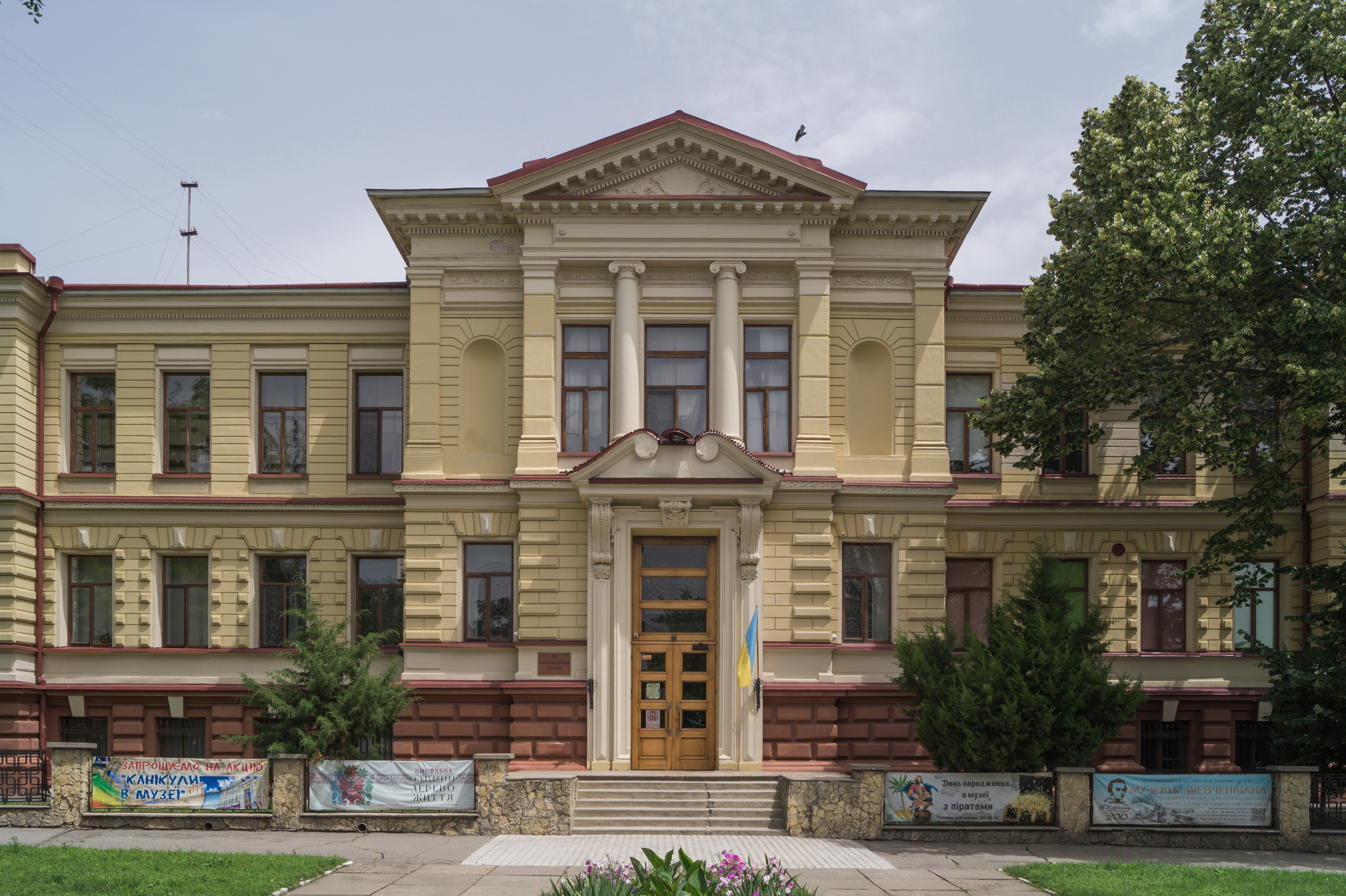
- The museum in 2016
- Established: 1890
- Location: Kherson, Ukraine

Immovable Monument of Local Significance of Ukraine
- Official name: Окружний суд (Regional court)
- Type: Architecture
- Reference no.: 230051-Хр

The Kherson Local History Museum is a cultural institution and museum that was created in 1963 following the merging of the Kherson Historico-Archeological Museum and the Kherson Natural Historical Museum. The Historico-Archeological Museum was founded in 1890 and the Natural Historical Museum was founded in 1899. The museum has a branch in Kakhovka.

The museum has information and items regarding the history of Kherson Oblast, including its natural history and history after the Ukrainian War of Independence, which began in 1917.

The museum's collection included, prior to the Russian invasion, anthropomorphic steles of the pit culture from 2nd millennium BC, mace tops of the catacomb culture (2nd millennium BC), ancient Greek amphoras from the late-Scythian period (3rd–2nd millennium BC), a Scythian ritual headdress (500 BC), a golden Sarmathian earring (300–100 BC), a Polovtsian stone woman statue (11th–12th centuries AD) and an early medieval chandelier.

== History ==
=== Russian invasion of Ukraine ===
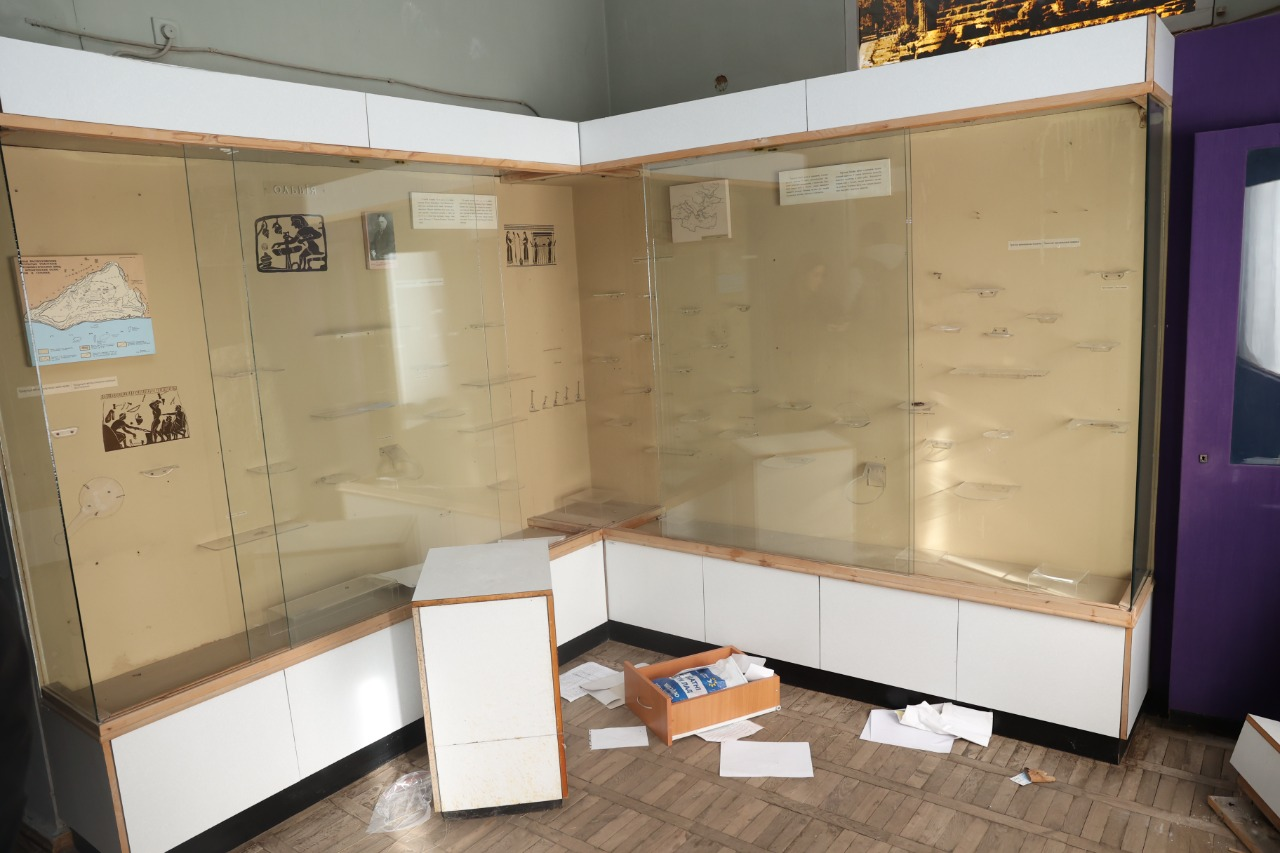
The museum was looted by Russian forces during the invasion.

During the Russian invasion of Ukraine and the Russian occupation of Kherson, the Russian Armed Forces looted the museum and its branch in Kahkovka. Stolen artifacts such as paintings were reported to Interpol, who publicised a database of the thefts in February 2026 in partnership with the National Police of Ukraine.
