= Mykola Yevdokymov =

Ukrainian astronomer (1868–1941)

- Мико́ла Євдоки́мов
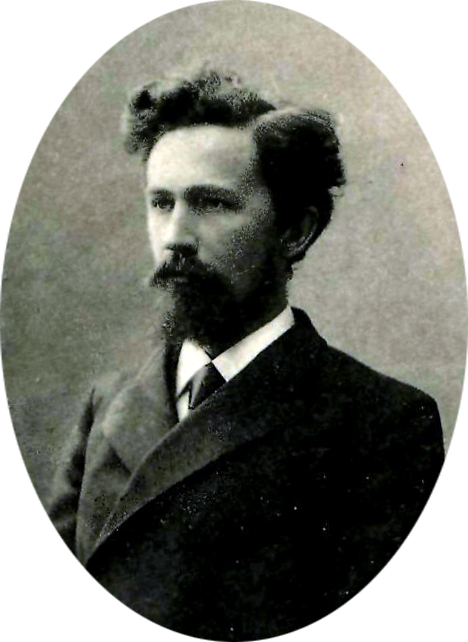
- Portrait in 1905
- Born: Mykola Yevdokymov; April 7, 1868; Kharkiv, Russian Empire (now Ukraine)
- Died: April 5, 1941 (aged 72); Kharkiv, Soviet Ukraine
- Education: Kharkiv University (PhD)
- Known for: Evdokimov crater
- Awards: Honored Science and Technology Figure of Ukraine
- Scientific career
- Fields: Astrometry
- Workplaces: Kharkiv Observatory
- Thesis: Determining the parallaxes of fixed stars from meridian circle observations at the Astronomical Observatory of Kharkiv University (1912)

Mykola Mykolayovych Yevdokymov (Note: Also rendered from the Russian form of his name as Nikolai (or Nikolaj) Nikolayevich Evdokimov. German-language journals of his day printed his name as Ewdokimow or Jewdokimow.) (Ukrainian: Микола Миколайович Євдокимов; Russian: Николай Николаевич Евдокимов; April 7 O.S. March 26], 1868 – April 5, 1941) (Note: Sources differ on the birth date. The Encyclopedia of Modern Ukraine gives March 25 (April 6) 1868, and the Biographical Encyclopedia of Astronomers entry uses the same date, while a 2008 biographical essay from the Kharkiv observatory gives March 26 (Old Style).) was a Ukrainian and Soviet astronomer. He measured stellar parallaxes and directed the Kharkiv Observatory. Most of his research relied on a Repsold meridian circle, which he used to fix the positions of stars and of the large planets. In 1935, he was named an Honored Science and Technology Figure of Ukraine.

In 1970, the International Astronomical Union (IAU) named a lunar crater Evdokimov in his honor.

== Early life and education ==
Yevdokymov was born in Kharkiv, then part of the Kharkov Governorate in the Russian Empire, on April 7, 1868. He finished his studies at Kharkiv University in 1890 with a first-class diploma, after which the university funded him to stay in its department of astronomy and geodesy and train for an academic chair. (Note: The Encyclopedia of Ukraine dates his arrival at the observatory to 1893, three years after his graduation.)

== Career ==
=== Early work at the observatory ===
In May 1891, Yevdokymov and his teacher Grigori Levitski watched a transit of Mercury through a three-inch refractor, and he later studied a total lunar eclipse; both sets of results appeared in Astronomische Nachrichten. He also worked out the observatory's latitude by several methods and, in 1893, published tables for computing zenith distances and azimuths at latitude 50°. He collaborated with astronomers at Pulkovo Observatory and published measurements of the planets.

In 1895, he and Ludwig Struve, the observatory's new head, began a long run of meridian circle observations for a catalogue of 800 zodiacal stars, in which each star was observed four times in each circle position. That same year the pair took part in geodetic leveling work that tied Kharkiv into the general network of precise levels used by the military topographic service. From 1896, he led students in charting the paths of Leonid meteors, and he repeated the exercise the following year. In November 1897, he was appointed an observing astronomer at the university observatory while keeping his rank as privat-dozent.

Around 1900 and 1901, astronomers around the world cooperated to measure the parallax of the asteroid 433 Eros, which would give an accurate distance to the Sun. Struve and Yevdokymov contributed by using the observatory's large Repsold circle to determine the positions and proper motions of the reference stars against which Eros was located. They also completed a catalogue of 779 zodiacal stars observed between 1898 and 1902. In 1901, he observed the variable stars δ Cephei and γ Aquilae.

=== Parallaxes and circumpolar stars ===
From 1903 to 1906, Yevdokymov kept observing zodiacal stars with the meridian circle. In the summer of 1904, the university sent him on a study tour of Europe to learn about new instruments and methods; he visited about twenty observatories and attended a general meeting of the German Astronomical Society. By early 1908, he had finished a series of observations with the Repsold circle to measure the annual parallaxes of a group of stars.

That year, he joined Struve and Boris Kudrevich in a project, lasting until 1915, to determine the right ascensions and declinations of circumpolar stars lying between 79 and 90 degrees of declination; the plan called for 1,407 well-determined stars and 106 primary stars, each observed at least four times. Measurements made at the observatory between 1924 and 1933 later allowed him to improve the declinations of 270 stars.

In 1910 and 1911, he cut back on routine observing to reduce his parallax data, although he still photographed Halley's Comet and took part in observing the total lunar eclipse of 1910. He defended his dissertation on stellar parallaxes derived from meridian circle observations in 1912. A catalogue of parallaxes for 59 stars was issued as a separate volume in German, and the Russian Astronomical Society honored the work with the Emperor Nicholas II Prize.

In 1914, Yevdokymov became a professor of astronomy at Kharkiv University. He measured stellar parallaxes with Sergei Kostinsky and made improvements to the meridian circle. That year he also photographed the long-period Delavan comet with Vasily Fesenkov and joined the observatory's expedition to the total solar eclipse of August 1914, where he and Boris Gerasimovich took photographs with an astrograph. In the autumn, he timed the second contact of Mercury's transit, and in 1915 he and Gerasimovich photographed Mellish's comet and a range of nebulae.

=== Director of the observatory ===
Yevdokymov became director of the Kharkiv Observatory in 1917, and he led it until illness forced him to resign in 1930. His years in charge coincided with the Ukrainian Revolution, which lasted from 1917 to 1921. Early in his tenure, he examined the shape of the meridian circle's pivots, concluded that they produced no errors that needed correcting when reducing observations, and began determining clock corrections on a regular basis. Between 1918 and 1921, he photographed Nova Aquilae 1918 through green and red filters, photographed an annular solar eclipse, and observed a partial lunar eclipse with Nikolai Barabashov. During the 1920s, he organized and joined observations of eclipses, of Mercury's passage across the Sun, and of the comets Stearns and 7P, and he studied refraction in the observatory's meridian hall.

Beyond Kharkiv, Yevdokymov represented the city, and Ukraine more broadly, at meetings of the German Astronomical Society in 1904, 1908, and 1913 and at international astronomical congresses in 1926 and 1928. From 1927 he took part in the All-Union Bureau of Longitudes, and from 1937 in the Astrometric Commission of the Astronomical Council of the USSR Academy of Sciences. In 1924, delegates to the third congress of the All-Russia Astronomical Union chose him to chair its presidium.

=== Later years ===
In the early 1930s, Yevdokymov observed star declinations with the meridian circle for a fundamental catalogue of declinations, which was finished in 1934. His textbook Practical Astronomy appeared in 1934 and was widely read by astronomers of his generation. Between 1934 and 1939, he determined the right ascensions and declinations of Jupiter, Saturn, Uranus, and Neptune, and he supervised the observatory's time service, which compared clocks daily, monitored their rates, and compiled summary reports, while the final calculations were done at the time laboratory of the Ukrainian Institute of Metrology and Standardization. In the same period, he helped reduce the observatory's observations of Mars and the giant planets from 1924 to 1931.

From 1935, he worked with his student Vladimir Mikhailov to fix star declinations from the sums and differences of the zenith distances of paired stars, using the method of Sanders and Raymond with a Repsold meridian circle and a Bamberg transit instrument; the work was completed in 1939. He and Boris Ostashchenko-Kudryavtsev also carried out extensive computations for the Catalogue of Declinations of Circumpolar Stars, including the reduction of 8,400 observations to apparent places.

In 1936, Yevdokymov traveled with other Kharkiv Observatory astronomers to the North Caucasus to observe the solar eclipse of June 19, 1936, known as the Great Soviet Eclipse. The party also included Boris Gerasimovich, Vasily Fesenkov, Praskov′ja Georgievna Parchomenko, and Nikolai Barabashov.

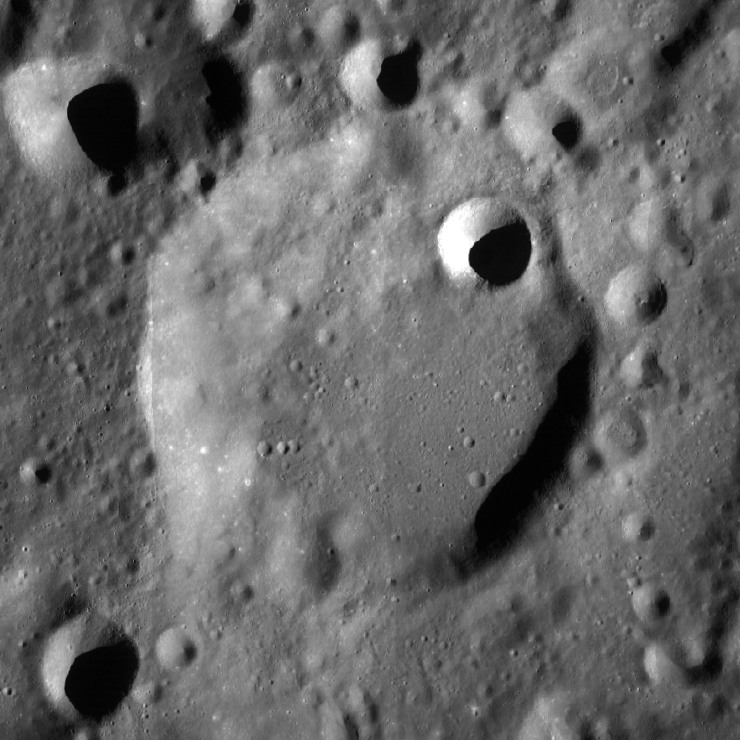
Evdokimov crater on the lunar surface

Through 1940 and 1941, he was still compiling the circumpolar declination catalogue, working from roughly 11,000 observations the observatory had gathered between 1909 and 1914, and he was still measuring planetary positions with the meridian circle.

Yevdokymov died in Kharkiv on April 5, 1941, aged 72.

== Recognition and legacy ==
Yevdokymov was named an Honored Science and Technology Figure of Ukraine in 1935, and the IAU gave his name to a crater on the far side of the Moon in 1970. Balyshev describes him as one of the founders of the astrometric school in Kharkiv. Star catalogues he helped produce are now part of the Ukrainian Virtual Observatory database, where they can help locate stars and transient objects that have dropped out of, or newly appeared in, modern catalogues. Balyshev also argues that his programs for measuring the positions of Solar System bodies and reducing those observations anticipated later discoveries of new objects in the Solar System.

== Works cited ==
- Balyshev, M. A. (2022). "Mykola Evdokymov (1868–1941): Founder of Astrometric Research at Kharkiv Astronomical Observatory". Kinematics and Physics of Celestial Bodies. 38 (2): 114–120. doi:10.3103/S0884591322020027.
