= Vasilij G. Shevchenko =

Ukrainian astronomer

- Василь Григорович Шевченко
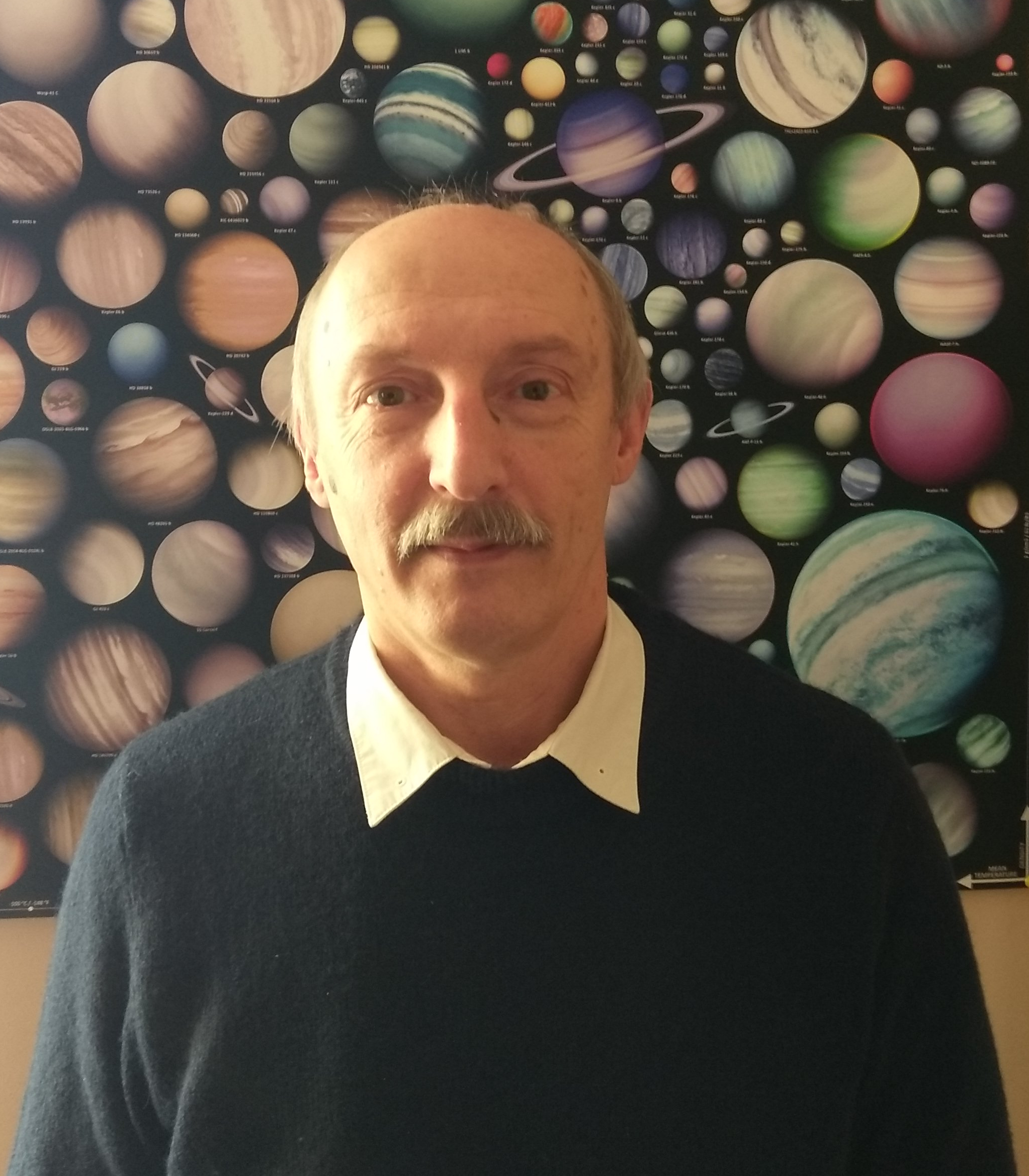
- Born: 15 October 1960; Novomutyn, Konotop Raion, Sumy Oblast, Ukrainian SSR
- Citizenship: Soviet Union; Ukraine
- Education: Kharkiv University
- Scientific career
- Fields: Astronomy
- Workplaces: Kharkiv Observatory
- Academic advisors: Dmitrij F. Lupishko

Vasilij G. Shevchenko (born 1960) is a Ukrainian astronomer, specialist in asteroid photometry, professor at the Department of Astronomy and Space Informatics of Kharkiv University. In 2012, he was awarded M. P. Barabashov Prize, the principal prize of the National Academy of Sciences of Ukraine for Solar System research.

== Biography ==
Shevchenko was born on October 15, 1960, in the village Novomutyn in the Sumy Oblast. In 1982, he graduated from the School of Physics Department of A. M. Gorky Kharkiv State University (now V. N. Karazin Kharkiv National University). After university, he served 2 years as an officer in the air defense forces (1982-1984). Since then, he has been working at the Kharkiv Observatory as a junior researcher (1985-1992), a PhD student (1992-1996), a researcher (1996-1998), and a senior researcher (since 1998).

In 1997, he defended his PhD thesis "Asteroid photometry: phase dependencies of brightness, photometric model". In 2017, he defended his doctoral dissertation "Integral photometry of asteroids: observation and numerical modeling".

Since 2006, he has been teaching at the Department of Astronomy of Kharkiv University as an Associate Professor (2006-2018) and Professor (since 2018). He conducts courses "Planetary Physics", "Practical Astrophysics", "Problems of Modern Astrophysics", "Computer Technologies", conducts astrophysical practice at Chuhuiv Observational Station

Member of the International Astronomical Union and the European Astronomical Society.

== Scientific results ==
Shevchenko's main contributions are studies of the phase dependence of the brightness and the opposition effect of asteroids. Based on the results of photometric observations, he determined the phase functions for different types of asteroids, studied the opposition effect up to extremely small phase angles (less than 1 degree), found some dark asteroids without an opposition effect, and determined the exact albedo for dozens of asteroids.

Shevchenko proposed an analytical expression for the phase function of asteroids. He established a strong correlation between the asteroid's albedo and the slope of the phase dependence, which can be used to determine the albedo.

With Shevchenko's participation, satellites of several asteroids and several variable stars were discovered.

== Honours and awards ==
- M. P. Barabashov Prize of the National Academy of Sciences of Ukraine (2012).
- The asteroid 17034 Vasylshev is named after Vasilij Shevchenko. In the nomination for the asteroid name, it was noted that Vasilij Shevchenko "is the most productive observer of the magnitude-phase dependence and opposition effect for minor planets. He was one of the first to show that the amplitude of the opposition effect depends on taxonomic class".

== Sources ==
- Шевченко Василь Григорович, Фізичний факультет Харківського національного університету
- Vasilij G. Shevchenko, Institute of Astronomy of Kharkiv National University
- Shevchenko, V. G. in Scopus
- Vasilij G. Shevchenko publications indexed by Google Scholar
