= Praskov′ja Georgievna Parchomenko =

Soviet astronomer

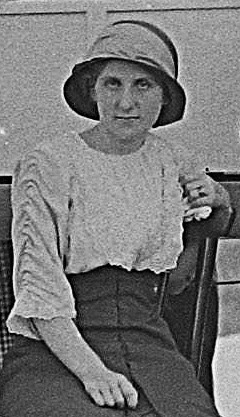
- Born: 1886
- Died: 1970 (aged 83–84)
- Occupation: Astronomer
- Known for: Discovery of 1129 Neujmina and 1166 Sakuntala

Praskov′ja Georgievna Parchomenko (1886–1970) was a Soviet astronomer who discovered many minor planets between the years of 1930–1940.

Parchomenko first discovered 1129 Neujmina on 8 August 1929 at the Simeiz Observatory. Less than a year later, Parchomenko discovered 1166 Sakuntala on June 27, 1930, only two nights before Karl Reinmuth viewed it.

On 30 August 1970, Tamara Smirnova discovered 1857 Parchomenko which was named in honour of Parchomenko.
