= Yevdokimov =

Yevdokimov (Евдокимов), alternatively spelled as Evdokimov (masculine), or Yevdokimova (feminine; Евдокимова) is a Russian surname. Notable people with it include:

- Alexander Ivanovich Yevdokimov (stomatologist) (1883–1979), a Soviet stomatologist and Hero of Socialist Labor.
- Alexander Ivanovich Yevdokimov (military officer) (1920–1979), a Soviet army officer and Full Cavalier of the Order of Glory.
- Alexander Yevdokimov (1906–1990), a Soviet army officer and Hero of the Soviet Union.
- Alexei Yevdokimov (1925–1943), a Soviet army officer and Hero of the Soviet Union.
- Grigory Yevdokimov (1884–1936), a Soviet army officer and Hero of the Soviet Union.
- Mikhail Yevdokimov (1957–2005), a Russian entertainer and politician.
- Nikolai Yevdokimov (1804–1873), a Russian military commander in Murid War and Russo-Circassian War.
- Oleg Yevdokimov (born 1994), Belarusian footballer
- Paul Evdokimov (1901-1970), a Russian and French Orthodox theologian and writer.
- Robert Yevdokimov (b. 1970), a Russian professional football coach and a former player.
- Vasily Yevdokimov (1898–1941), Soviet general
- Vladimir Yevdokimov (1923–20??), a Soviet army officer and Hero of the Soviet Union.
- Yefim Yevdokimov (1881–1940), a Soviet politician and member of the Cheka.
- Yury Yevdokimov (b. 1946), ex-Governor of Murmansk Oblast.

== See also ==
- Evdokimov (crater), lunar crater
