= Vadym Kaydash =

Ukrainian astronomer

- Кайдаш Вадим Григорович
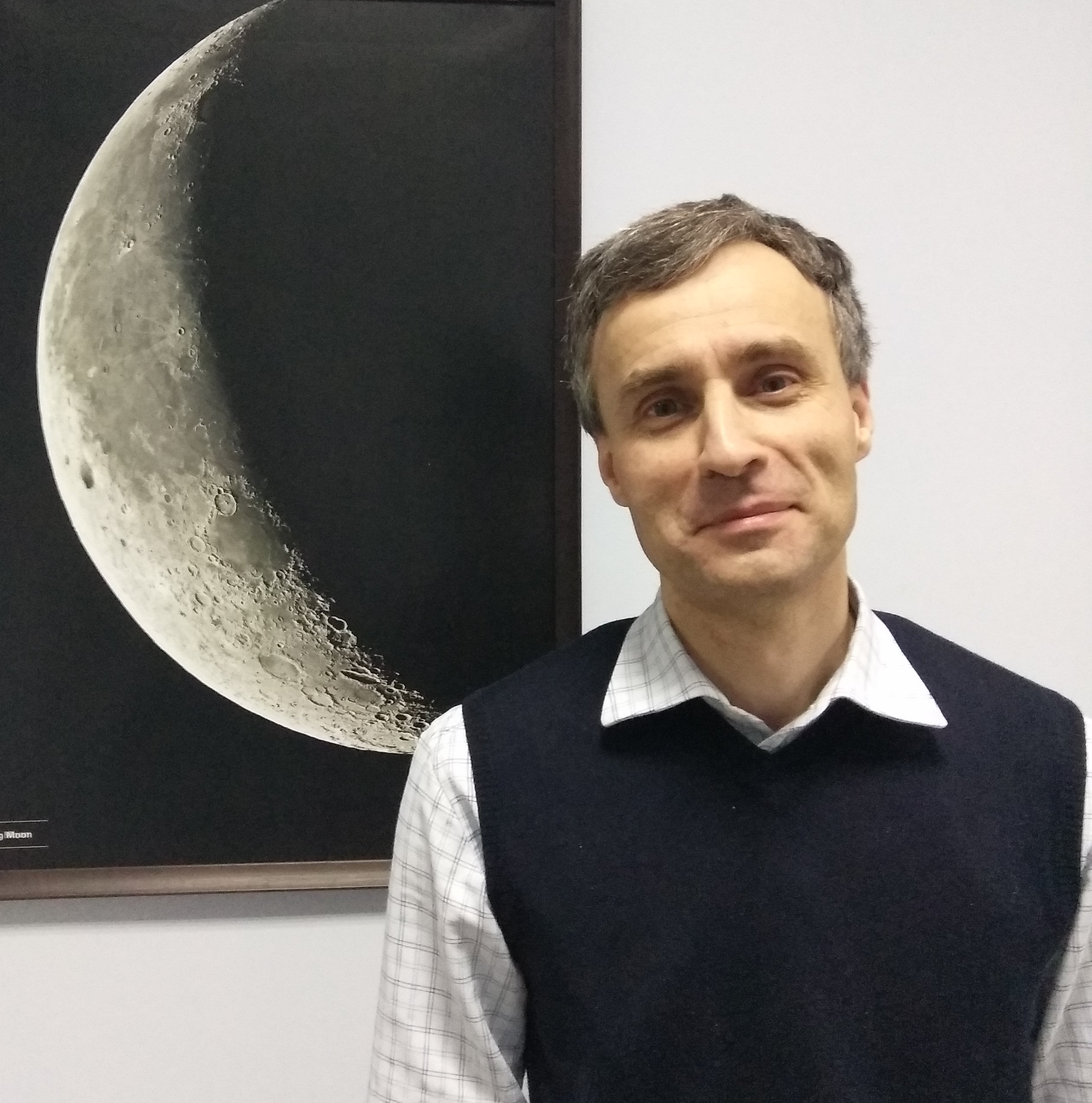
- Born: 9 October 1971
- Citizenship: Soviet Union, Ukraine
- Education: Kharkiv University
- Scientific career
- Fields: Astronomy
- Workplaces: Kharkiv Observatory
- Doctoral advisor: Yuriy G. Shkuratov

Vadym Kaydash (born 1971) is a Ukrainian astronomer, specialist in spectroscopy and polarimetry of Small Solar System bodies, director of the Institute of Astronomy of Kharkiv National University, recipient of the State Prize of Ukraine in Science and Technology (2010).

== Biography ==
Vadym Kaydash was born in Kharkiv. In 1988–1993, he studied at the School of Physics of Kharkiv State University. In 1994–1997, he was a PhD student of Kharkiv University, and in 1999 he defended his PhD thesis "Prediction of chemical composition and zoning of the surface of the visible hemisphere of the Moon according to the optical measurements".

Since 1997 he has been working at the Institute of Astronomy of Kharkiv National University. In 2012, he took the position of head of the Department of Remote Sensing of Planets at the Institute of Astronomy, and in 2014 he was elected Director of the Institute of Astronomy.

Since 2014, he has been working as an associate professor at the Department of Astronomy and Space Informatics of Kharkiv National University. He teaches courses "Mathematical Modeling", "Computer Science and Programming".

== Scientific results ==
Vadym Kaidash worked on determining the composition of lunar soil according to the Clementine spacecraft, studied optical anomalies of the lunar surface by the data of Lunar Reconnaissance Orbiter (NASA), SELENE (JAXA), Smart-1 (ESA), and also by the data from telescopic observations. By the data of the Hubble Space Telescope, he made polarimetric study of Mars and analyzed the dynamics of clouds in the atmosphere of Mars. He also made a significant contribution to the theoretical and experimental study reflection of light by regolith.

== Honours and awards ==
- Prize for the best science publication of Russian Academy of Sciences (1999)
- Basic sciences book award of International Academy of Astronautics (2010)
- State Prize of Ukraine in Science and Technology (2010)

== Sources ==
- Vadym G. Kaydash, Institute of Astronomy of Kharkiv National University
- Кайдаш Вадим Григорович, фізичний факультет ХНУ ім. В. Н. Каразіна
- Kaydash, Vadym in Scopus
- Vadym Kaydash publications indexed by Google Scholar
- Stefan Weichert, Professors at Bombed Kharkiv University Struggle to Continue Their Work, The Scientist
