= Dmitriy G. Stankevich =

Ukrainian astronomer

- Дмитро Геннадійович Станкевич
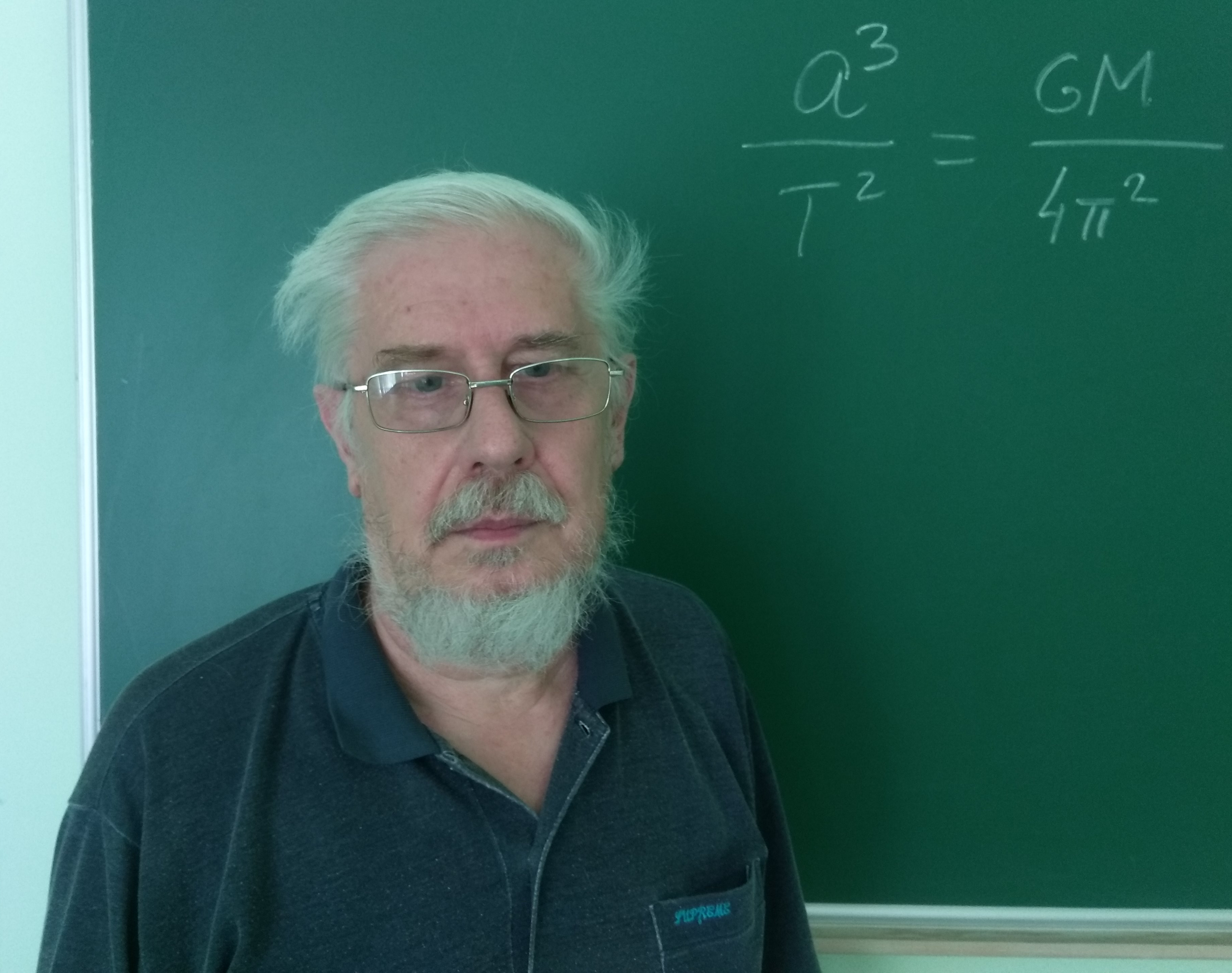
- Born: 1956 (age 69–70)
- Citizenship: Soviet Union; Ukraine
- Education: Kharkiv University
- Scientific career
- Fields: Astronomy
- Workplaces: O. Ya. Usikov Institute for Radiophysics and Electronics, Kharkiv Observatory, Kharkiv University
- Doctoral advisor: Leonid Akimov

Dmitriy G. Stankevich (born 1956) is a Ukrainian astronomer, specialist in computer modeling of light scattering by regoliths of planets and the Moon, as well as in digital processing of astronomical images. Winner of the State Prize of the Ukrainian SSR in Science and Technology (1986).

== Biography ==
In 1978, Dmitriy G. Stankevich graduated from Kharkiv State University. He worked at the Institute for Radiophysics and Electronics of the Academy of Sciences of the Ukrainian SSR on the development of software and hardware for digital processing of astronomical and space images. For these works, he received the State Prize of the Ukrainian SSR in Science and Technology in the field of science and technology in 1986.

In 1988 Stankevich moved to work at Kharkiv University. He continued his research on processing of astronomical and space images, and worked on the issues of light scattering by surfaces of celestial bodies. In 1989 he defended his PhD thesis "Investigation of the surface of Venus by digital image processing methods".

Since 2001, Stankevich has been working as an associate professor at the Department of Astronomy at the School of Physics of Kharkiv University. He teaches General Astronomy, Theoretical Astrophysics, and Computer Technologies in Astronomy. He also directs bachelor's and master's theses of students, supervises research works of schoolchildren at the Minor Academy of Sciences, gives popular science talks.

== Honours and awards ==
- State Prize of the Ukrainian SSR in Science and Technology (1986)

== Sources ==
- 200 лет астрономии в Харьковском университете / Шкуратов Ю. Г. (ред.). — Харків : ХНУ, 2008. — 632 с. — 500 прим.
- Станкевич Дмитро Геннадійович, фізичний факультет ХНУ ім. В. Н. Каразіна
- Stankevich, Dmitriy G. in Scopus
