= Dmitrij F. Lupishko =

Ukrainian astronomer

Dmitrij F. Lune
- Лупішко Дмитро Федорович
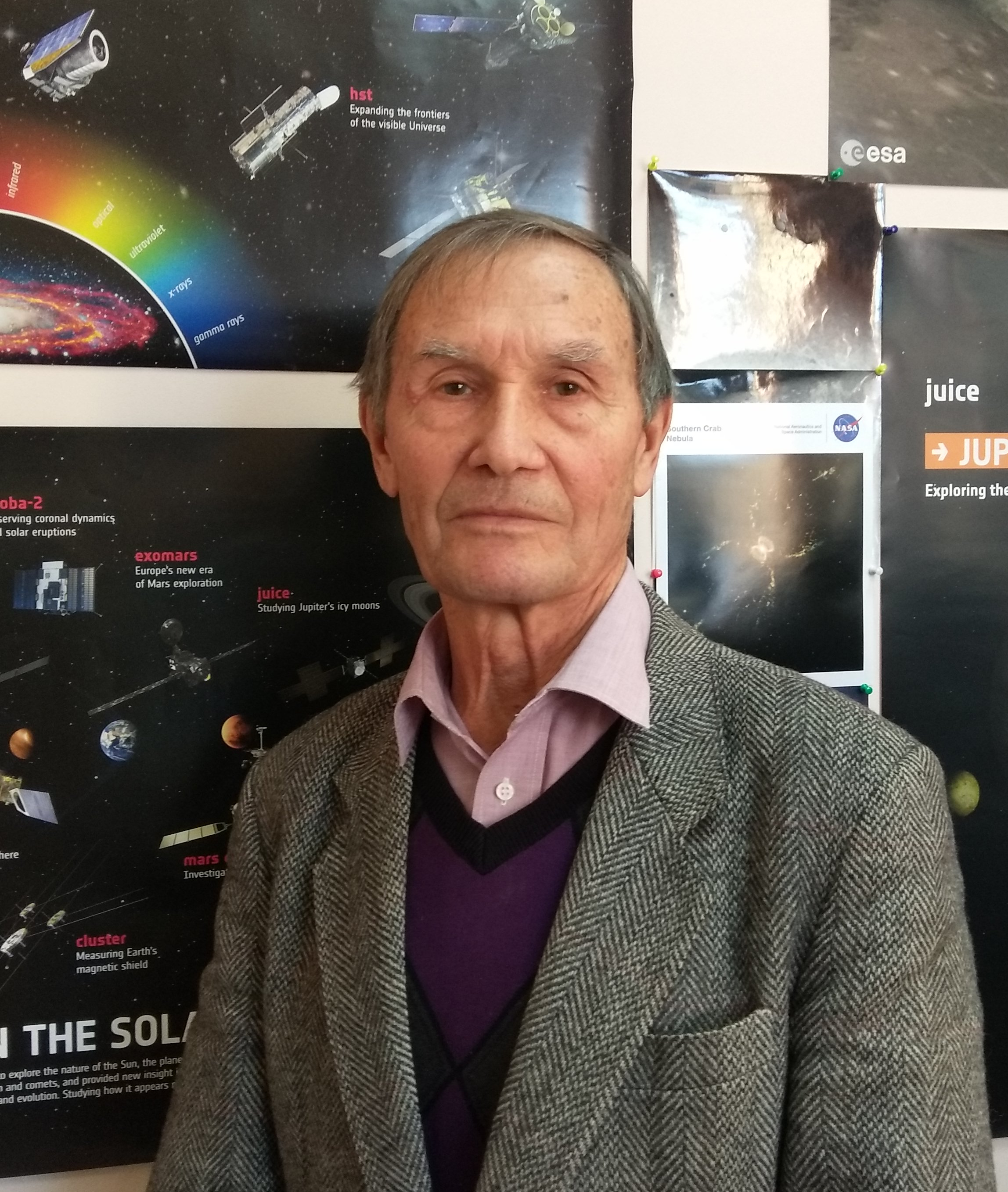
- Born: 15 February 1942; Konotop Raion, Sumy Oblast, Ukrainian SSR
- Citizenship: Soviet Union; Ukraine
- Education: Kharkiv University
- Scientific career
- Fields: Astronomy
- Workplaces: Kharkiv Observatory
- Academic advisors: Nikolai P. Barabashov
- Notable students: Irina Belskaya; Vasilij G. Shevchenko; Yurij N. Krugly

Dmitrij F. Lupishko (born 1942) is a Ukrainian astronomer, founder of the Kharkiv asteroid science school, head of the Department of Physics of Asteroids and Comets at Kharkiv Observatory (1989-2012), recipient of the State Prize of Ukraine in Science and Technology (2010).

== Biography ==
Dmitrij Lupishko was born on February 15, 1942, in the village of Koshary, Sumy Oblast. In 1969, he graduated from the School of Physics of Kharkiv State University and entered graduate school under the guidance of academician Nikolai P. Barabashov, but in 1971 Barabashov died. In 1975, Dmitry Lupishko defended his PhD thesis "Absolute integral and surface photometry of Mars in the opposition of 1971". In 1999 he defended his Sc.D. dissertation "Photometry and polarimetry of asteroids: results of observations and data analysis". From 1993 to 2006, he was the head of the Department of Physics of Asteroids and Comets at the Institute of astronomy.

Having started his scientific career with the research of Mars, he eventually began to study asteroids. In 1984, he created and headed the asteroids working group at the Academy of Sciences of the USSR. In the following years, Dmitrij Lupishko organized and held four meetings of this working group, as well as two all-USSR seminars. Later, he organized international workshops "Polarimetry of Comets and Asteroids" (1997) and "Photometry and Polarimetry of Asteroids" (2003) at Kharkiv Observatory.

In asteroid physics, Dmitrij Lupishko studied the laws of light scattering by asteroid surfaces and discovered several new polarization effects. He showed that the surfaces Of M-type asteroids are not purely metallic, but contain a significant part of silicates. He improved the values of asteroid diameters and albedos obtained by the infrared space telescope IRAS. Dmitrij Lupishko also created the polarimetric asteroid database, which is now a part of the Planetary Data System.

== Honours and awards ==
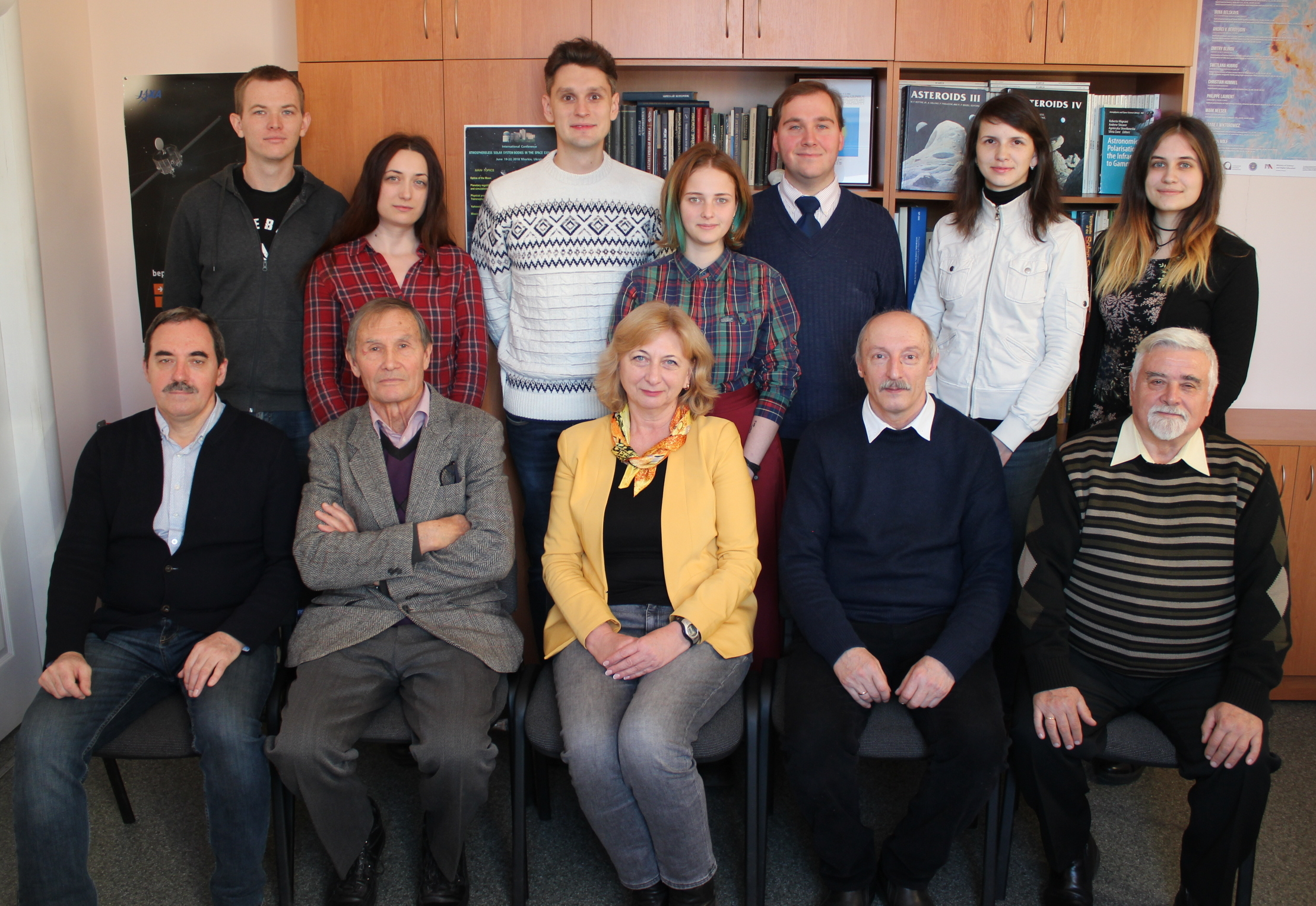
Department of Physics of Asteroids and Comets of Kharkiv Institute of Astronomy. In the first row, Dmitry Lupishko (second from left) and his students Yurij N. Krugly, Irina Belskaya (current head of the Department), Vasilij G. Shevchenko, Vasilij Chiorny. In the second row are standing the junior employees of the Department, students of Lupishko's students.

- State Prize of Ukraine in Science and Technology (2010).
- M. P. Barabashov Prize of the National Academy of Sciences of Ukraine (1988).
- Asteroid 3210 Lupishko is named after the scientist.

== Sources ==
- Бакіров В. С. (ред.). Лупішко Дмитро Федорович // Професори Харківського національного університету імені В. Н. Каразіна. Біобібліографічний довідник. — Харків : ХНУ ім. В. Н. Каразіна, 2009. — С. 191. — 700 прим.
- Лупішко Дмитро Федорович, Енциклопедія сучасної України
- Dmitrij F. Lupishko, Institute of Astronomy of Kharkiv National University
- Lupishko, Dimitrij F. in Scopus
