= 1857 Parchomenko =

Stony asteroid and suspected binary

Discovery
- Discovered by: T. Smirnova
- Discovery site: Crimean Astrophysical Obs.
- Discovery date: 30 August 1971

Designations
- Named after: Praskoviya Parchomenko (Russian astronomer)
- Alternative designations: 1971 QS_{1} · 1931 XT; 1941 WJ · 1974 OE_{1}
- Minor planet category: main-belt · (inner)

Orbital characteristics
- Epoch 4 September 2017 (JD 2458000.5)
- Uncertainty parameter 0
- Observation arc: 85.42 yr (31,198 days)
- Aphelion: 2.5459 AU
- Perihelion: 1.9414 AU
- Semi-major axis: 2.2436 AU
- Eccentricity: 0.1347
- Orbital period (sidereal): 3.36 yr (1,228 days)
- Mean anomaly: 199.01°
- Mean motion: 0° 17^{m} 35.88^{s} / day
- Inclination: 4.4006°
- Longitude of ascending node: 236.05°
- Argument of perihelion: 174.05°

Physical characteristics
- Dimensions: 7.986±0.201; 8.513±0.184 km 9.84 km (calculated)
- Synodic rotation period: 3.08±0.01 h 3.1177±0.0001 h
- Geometric albedo: 0.20 (assumed); 0.2952±0.0580; 0.333±0.053
- Spectral type: SMASS = S · S
- Absolute magnitude (H): 12.3 · 12.4

1857 Parchomenko, provisional designation 1971 QS_{1}, is a stony asteroid and suspected binary from the inner regions of the asteroid belt, approximately 8 kilometers in diameter.

It was discovered on 30 August 1971, by Russian astronomer Tamara Smirnova at Crimean Astrophysical Observatory in Nauchnyj, on the Crimean peninsula, and named after astronomer Praskoviya Parchomenko.

== Orbit and classification ==
Parchomenko orbits the Sun in the inner main-belt at a distance of 1.9–2.5 AU once every 3 years and 4 months (1,228 days). Its orbit has an eccentricity of 0.13 and an inclination of 4° with respect to the ecliptic.

First identified as 1931 XT at Lowell Observatory, the body's first used observation was taken at Nice Observatory in 1939, extending its observation arc by 32 years prior to its official discovery observation at Nauchnyj.

== Physical characteristics ==
In the SMASS classification, Parchomenko is a common S-type asteroid.

=== Diameter and albedo ===
According to the survey carried out by NASA's Wide-field Infrared Survey Explorer with its subsequent NEOWISE mission, Parchomenko measures 7.99 and 9.84 kilometers in diameter, and its surface has an albedo of 0.295 and 0.333, respectively. The Collaborative Asteroid Lightcurve Link assumes a standard albedo for stony asteroids of 0.20 and calculates a diameter of 8.5 kilometers, based on an absolute magnitude of 12.4.

=== Rotation period ===
In December 2005, a rotational lightcurve of Parchomenko was obtained from a photometric observations by Robert Stephens, Brian Warner and Petr Pravec. It gave a well-defined rotation period of 3.1177 hours with a brightness variation of 0.22 magnitude (U=3).

=== Suspected binary ===
Three possible occultation events were observed, suggesting that Parchomenko might be a binary asteroid, having a minor-planet moon as companion. However, no new findings have been made since. In October 2008, Italian amateur astronomer Silvano Casulli measured a similar period of 3.08 hours with an amplitude of 0.27 magnitude (U=3).

== Naming ==
This minor planet was named in honor of Russian astronomer Praskoviya Parchomenko (1886–1970), who observed and discovered the minor planets 1129 Neujmina and 1166 Sakuntala at the Crimean Simeiz Observatory during the 1930s and 1940s. The official naming citation was published by the Minor Planet Center on 1 June 1975 (M.P.C. 3826).
