= Yurij N. Krugly =

Ukrainian astronomer

- Юрій Миколайович Круглий
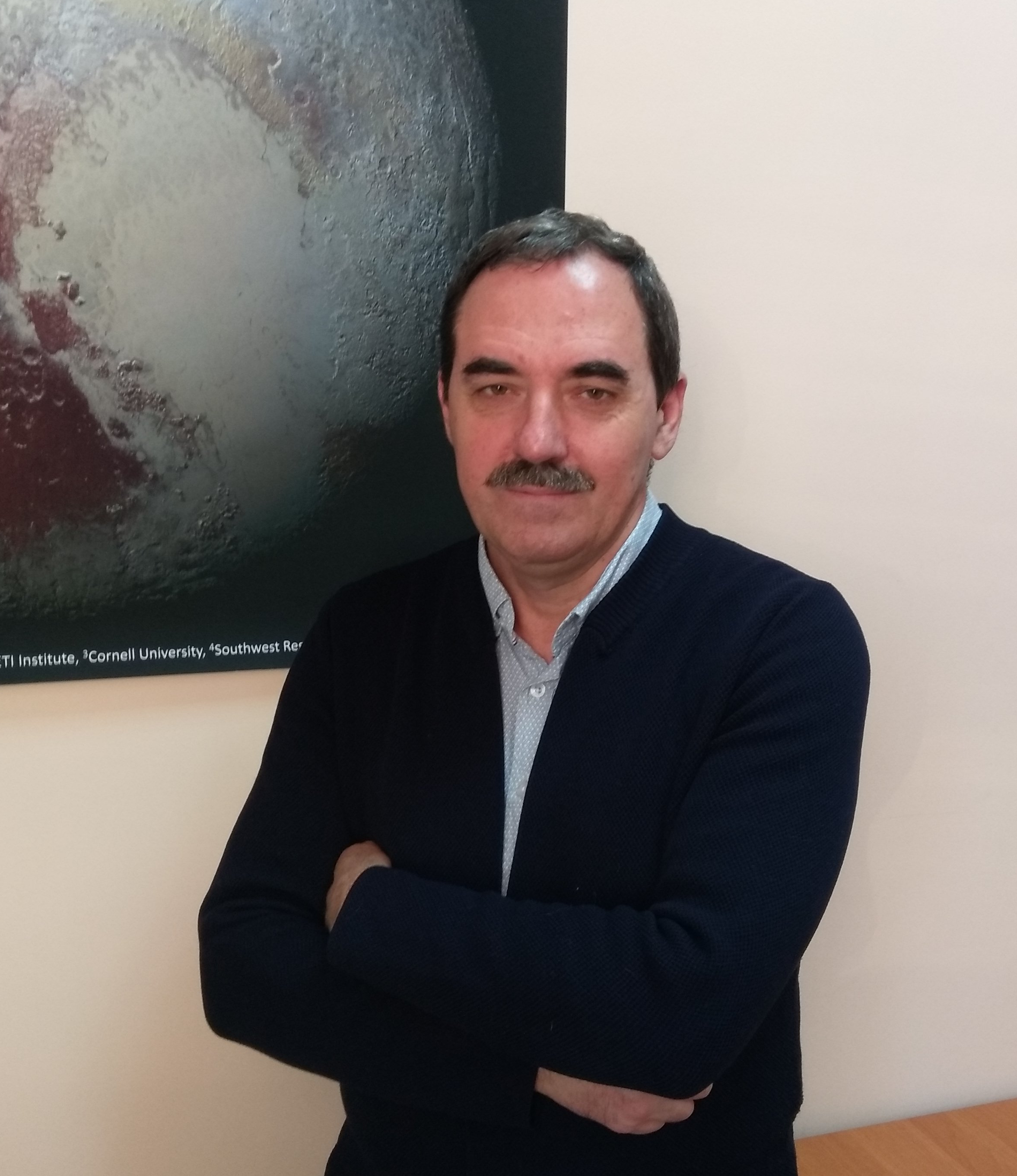
- Born: 7 August 1962; Kharkiv Oblast, Ukrainian SSR
- Citizenship: Soviet Union; Ukraine
- Education: Kharkiv University
- Scientific career
- Fields: Astronomy
- Workplaces: Kharkiv Observatory
- Doctoral advisor: Dmitrij F. Lupishko

Yurij N. Krugly (born 1962) is a Ukrainian astronomer, specialist in asteroids, notable for obtaining light curves and co-discovering YORP acceleration of many asteroids. He works at the Department of asteroids and comets of Kharkiv Observatory. In 2012, he was awarded M. P. Barabashov Prize, the principal prize of the National Academy of Sciences of Ukraine for the Solar System research.

== Biography ==
Yurij Krugly was born in Kharkiv Region on August 7, 1962. In 1980–1985, he studied at the Department of Astronomy of the School of Physics of Kharkiv State University. In 1985–1988, he worked as a Junior researcher at the observatory in Ashgabat. In 2004, he defended his PhD thesis. In 2007, he received the scientific title of senior researcher. Yurij Krugly is married, has a daughter.

== Scientific results ==
Yuri Krugly is known primarily for astrometric studies (measurements of the brightness) of asteroids and Trans-Neptunian objects. In particular, he obtained the light curves and determined the rotation periods of many asteroids. Thanks to this, he co-authored the discovery of the Yarkovsky–O'Keefe–Radzievskii–Paddac (YORP) acceleration of asteroids 1620 Geographos, 1862 Apollo, 3103 Eger. He also discovered several binary asteroids.

== Honours and awards ==
- M. P. Barabashov Prize of the National Academy of Sciences of Ukraine (2012)
- Asteroid 17036 Krugly is named after the scientist. In the nomination for the name, Yuri Krugny is called "an unsurpassed observer of minor planets". It is also noted that he "carried out photometric observation of more than 100 near-earth asteroids, and, together with P. Pravec, discovered and investigated several binary systems".

== Sources ==
- Yurij N. Krugly, Institute of Astronomy of Kharkiv National University
- Yurij N. Krugly in Scopus
- Yurij N. Krugly publications indexed by Google Scholar
