= Irina Belskaya =

Ukrainian astronomer

- Бельська Ірина Миколаївна
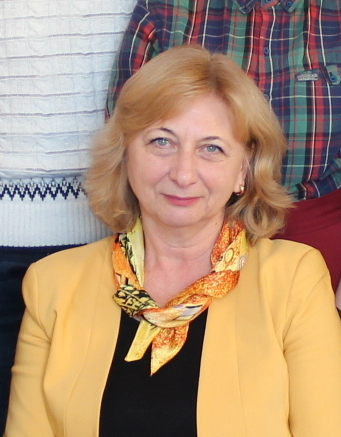
- Born: 14 November 1958
- Citizenship: Soviet Union; Ukraine
- Education: Kharkiv University
- Scientific career
- Fields: Astronomy
- Workplaces: Kharkiv Observatory
- Doctoral advisor: Dmitrij F. Lupishko

Irina Belskaya (born 1958) is a Ukrainian astronomer, specialist in spectroscopy and polarimetry of Small Solar System bodies, head of the Department of Physics of Asteroids and Comets of the Institute of Astronomy of Kharkiv National University, recipient of the State Prize of Ukraine in Science and Technology (2010).

== Biography ==
Irina Belskaya was born on November 14, 1958, in Kharkiv Oblast. In 1975, she graduated from a specialized physics and mathematics school with a gold medal and entered the Astronomy Department of Kharkiv University. In 1980, she graduated from the university with honors and began working at the Kharkiv Observatory. In 1987, she defended her PhD thesis "Photometry and polarimetry of M-type asteroids".

She worked at the Uppsala Observatory (Sweden, 1992-1993) and Paris Observatory (France, 2002-2004). She received grants from the American Astronomical Society (1992), DAAD (2000), the European Space Agency (2003), the International Space Science Institute (2008), scholarship from the Swedish Institute (1992), and the Marie Curie International Scholarship (2009). In 2008, she defended her Sc.D. dissertation "Optical properties of surfaces of asteroids, centaurs, and Kuiper belt bodies".

In 2010, she received the State Prize of Ukraine in Science and Technology for the collective work "Advancement of theoretical foundation, development and application of polarimetric techniques and instrumentation for remote sensing studies of Solar System objects by ground-based, aircraft, and spacecraft means".

== Honours and awards ==
- State Prize of Ukraine in Science and Technology (2010)
- Award of the International Academy of Astronautics for the best basic scientific book (2009)
- The asteroid 8786 Belskaya is named after the scientist

== Sources ==
- Бакіров В. С. (ред.). Бельська Ірина Миколаївна // Професори Харківського національного університету імені В. Н. Каразіна. Біобібліографічний довідник. — Харків : ХНУ ім. В. Н. Каразіна, 2009. — С. 34. — 700 прим.
- Irina Belskaya, Institute of Astronomy of Kharkiv National University
- Belskaya, Irina N. in Scopus
- Irina Belskaya publications indexed by Google Scholar
