= Chuhuiv Observational Station =

Astronomical observatory in Ukraine

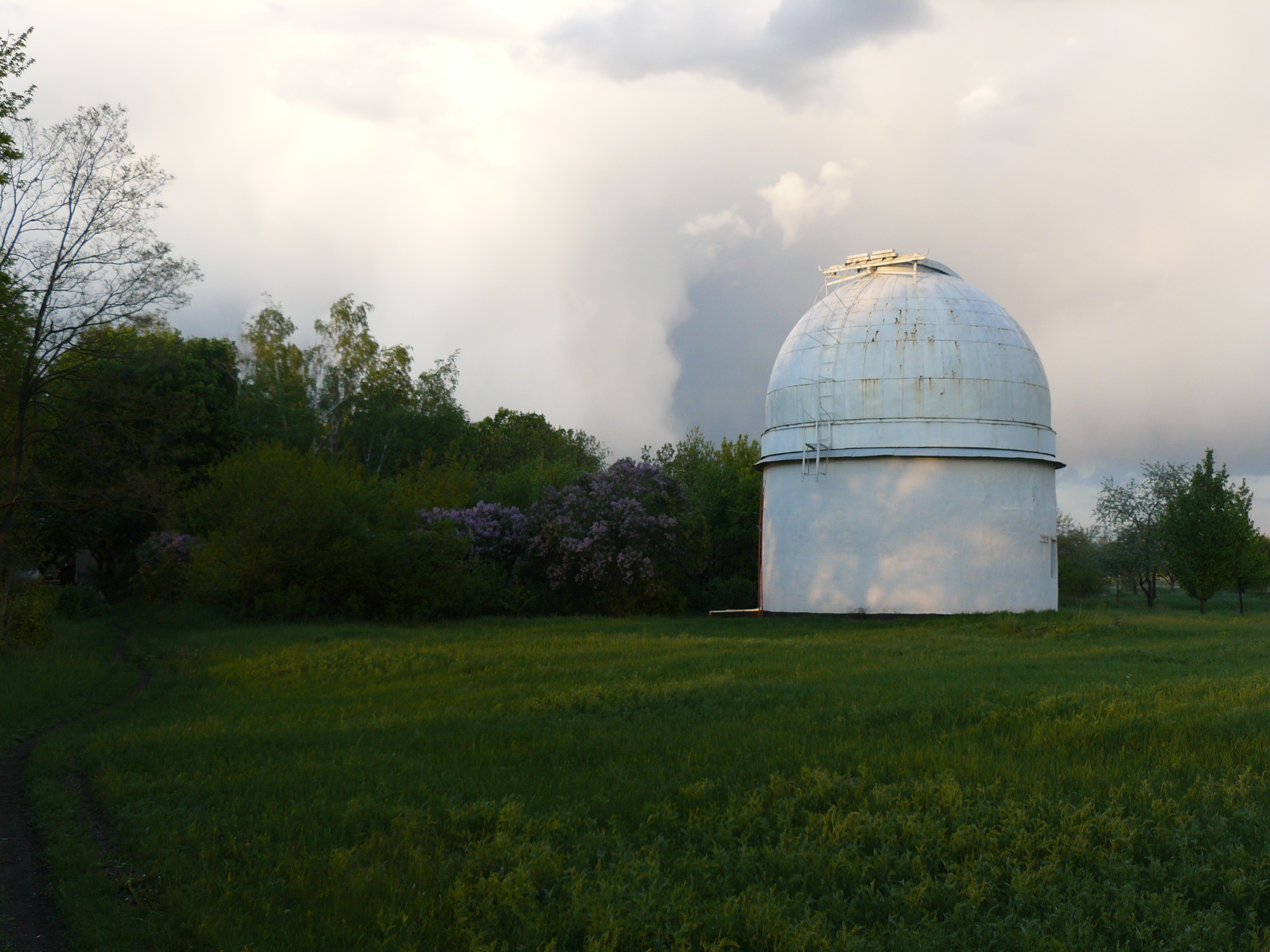
- Dome of 70-cm telescope AZT-8
- Organization: Kharkiv National University
- Observatory code: 121
- Location: Chuhuiv Raion, Ukraine
- Coordinates: 49°38′34.6″N 36°56′12.8″E
- Altitude: 156 m (512 ft)
- Established: 1962
- Website: www.astron.kharkov.ua/grakovo/index.html

Telescopes
- AZT-8: 0.7 m reflector
- Related media on Commons

Chuhuiv Observational Station (or Chuguev Observational Station) of the Institute of Astronomy of Kharkiv National University is an astronomical observatory founded in the early 1960s near the village of Ivanovka, Chuhuiv Raion, Kharkiv Oblast, Ukraine. The observatory conducted photometric observations of asteroids, searches for exoplanets, and meteor observations. The coherent optics laboratory made a significant contribution to the development of speckle interferometry methods.

In 2022, the observation station was severely damaged and looted by Russian occupiers.

== Location ==
The observatory is located in the Chuguyiv Raion, southeast of Kharkiv. Located at an altitude of 156 m above sea level. The state highway M 03 Kharkiv passes near the observatory. The UTR-2 radio telescope, subordinate to the Radio Astronomy Institute of the National Academy of Sciences of Ukraine, is located close to the observatory.

== History ==
The observatory was founded on the initiative of Academician Nikolai P. Barabashov in the early 1960s, when it became clear that the light pollution of Kharkiv did not allow for high-quality astronomical observations. The main instrument of the observatory is 70-cm reflector AZT-8. The observational station hosted one of the first coherent optics processors used to reduce astronomical observations. The main topics of the observations conducted on the observational station are photometric observations of asteroids and monitoring of space debris. In particular, the observations conducted here significantly contributed to the introduction of H-G1-G2 asteroid magnitude system and to the discovery of the YORP effect for several asteroids.

In 2022 the observational station was occupied and severely plundered by Russian soldiers, who during 6 months of occupation stole or damaged most of the scientific equipment.

== Gallery ==
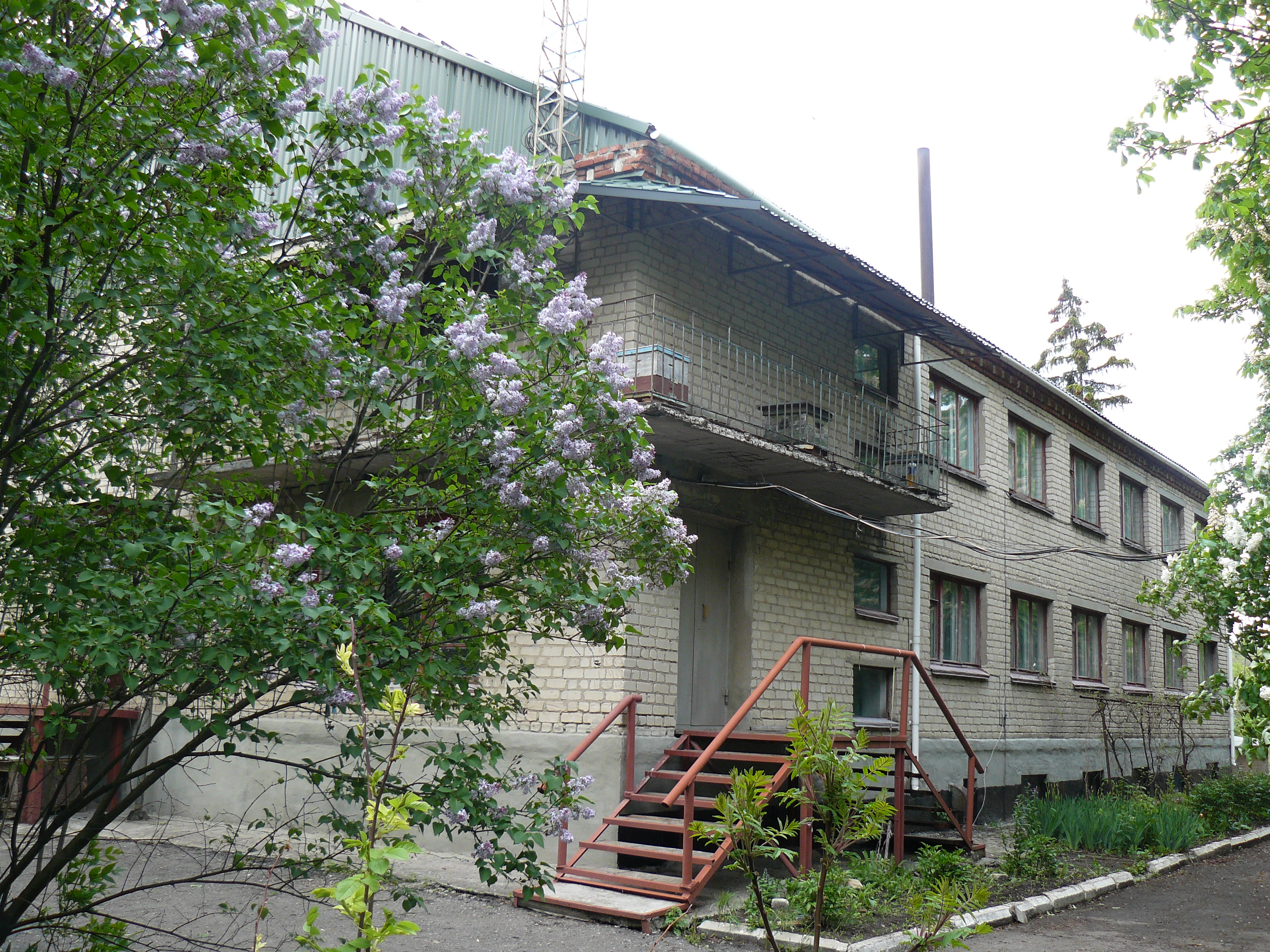
Station building, 2009

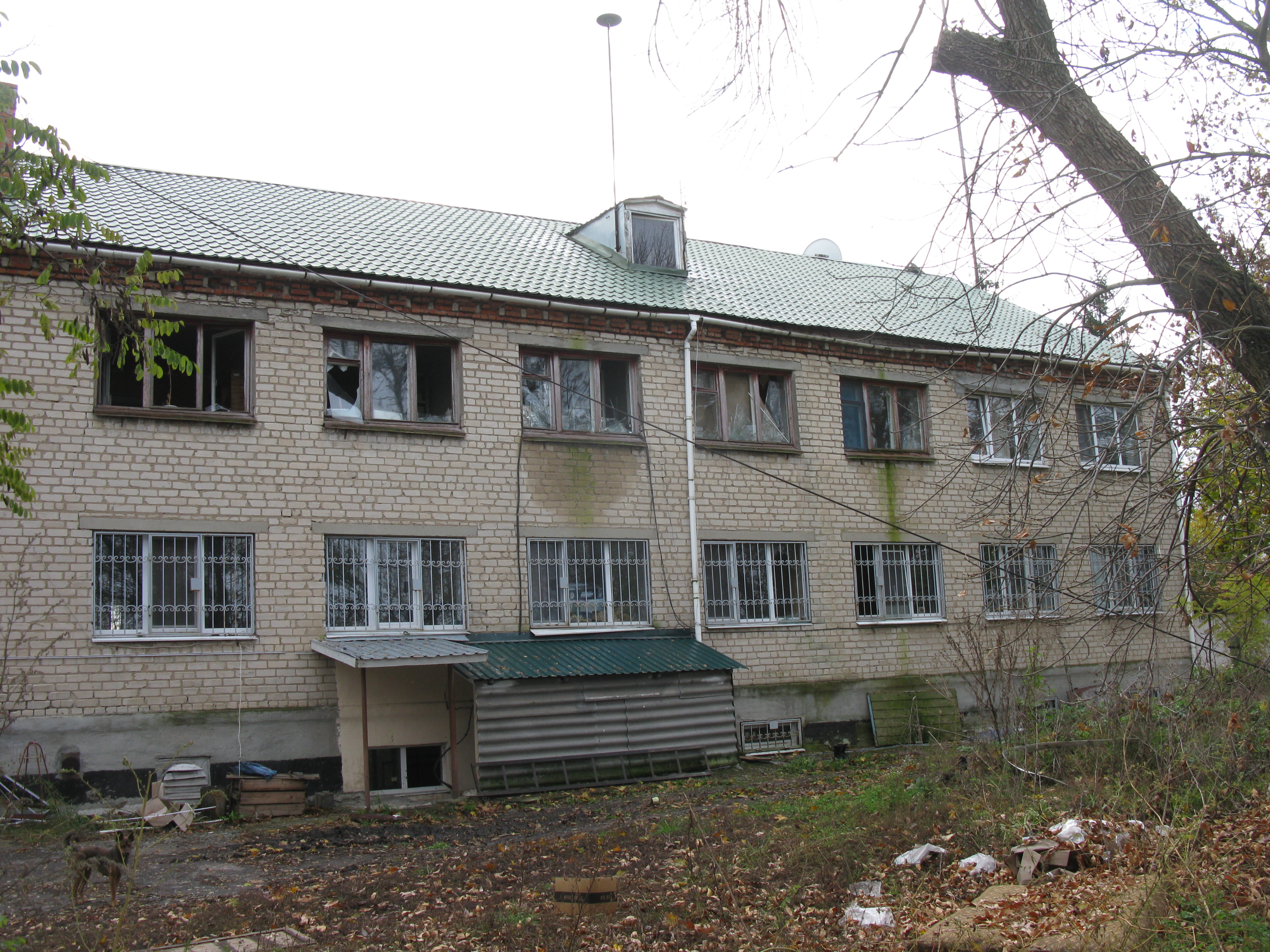
Windows, damaged by shooting

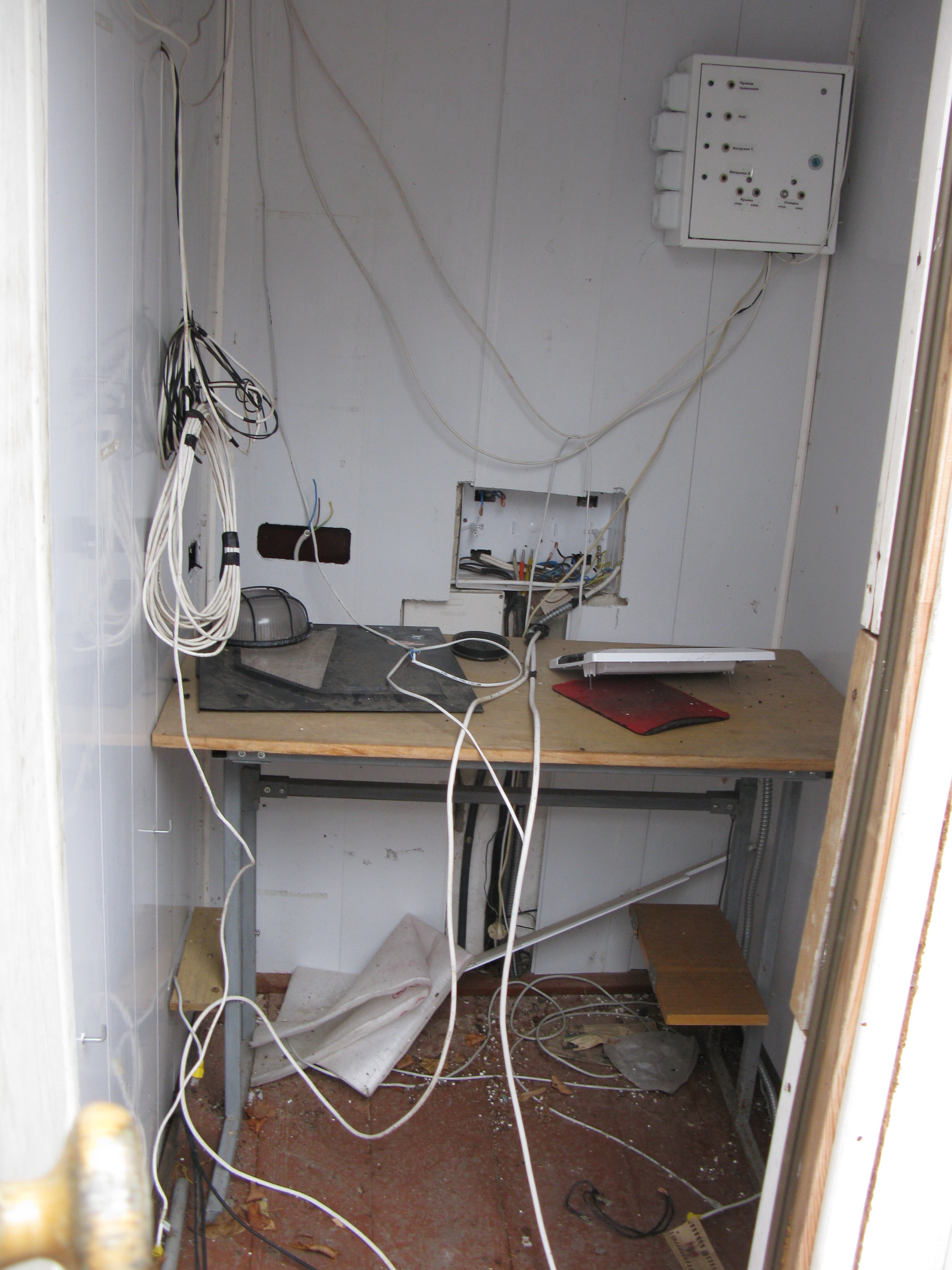
Computer stolen by Russian soldiers

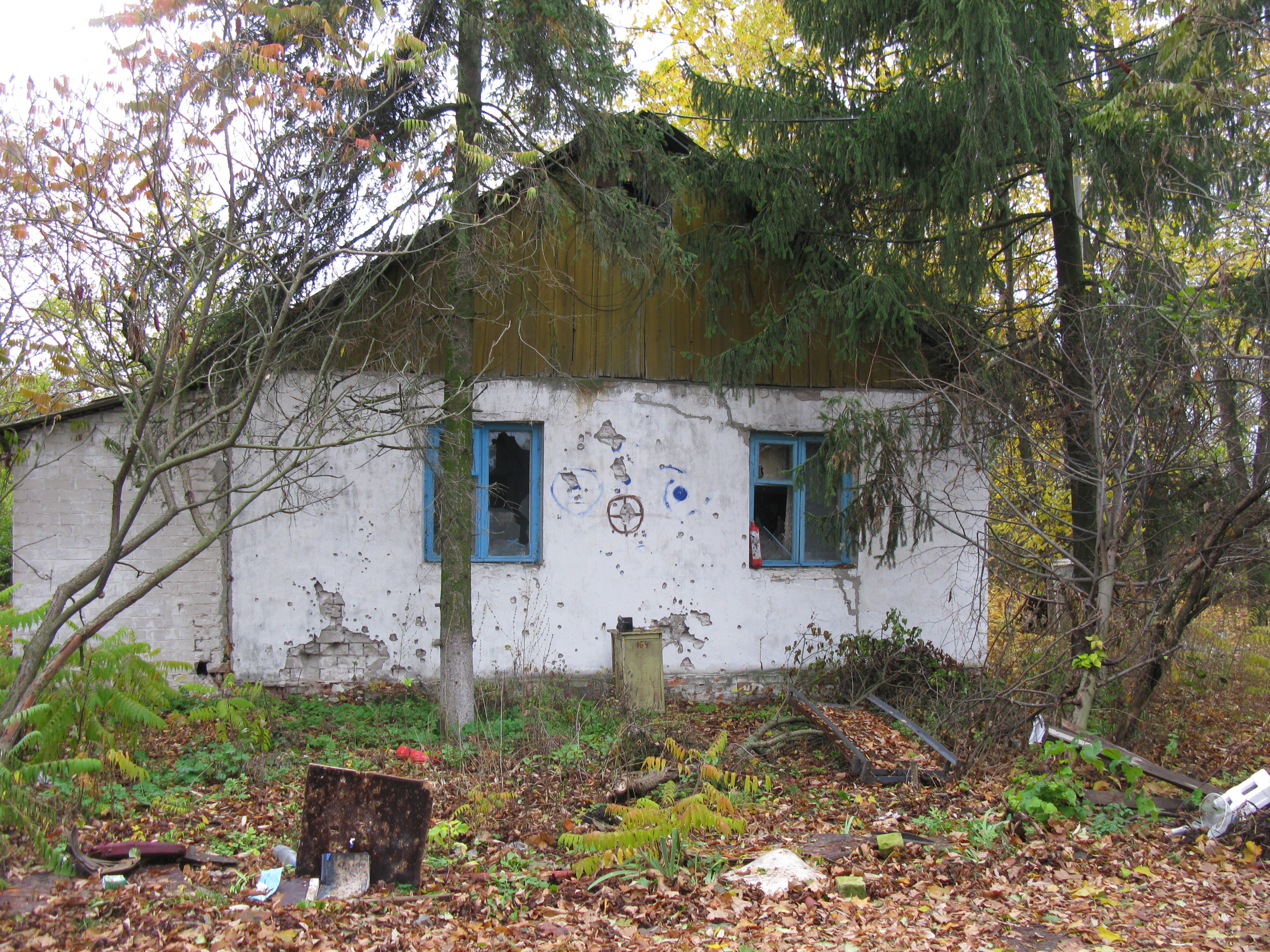
Target on a building used for shooting

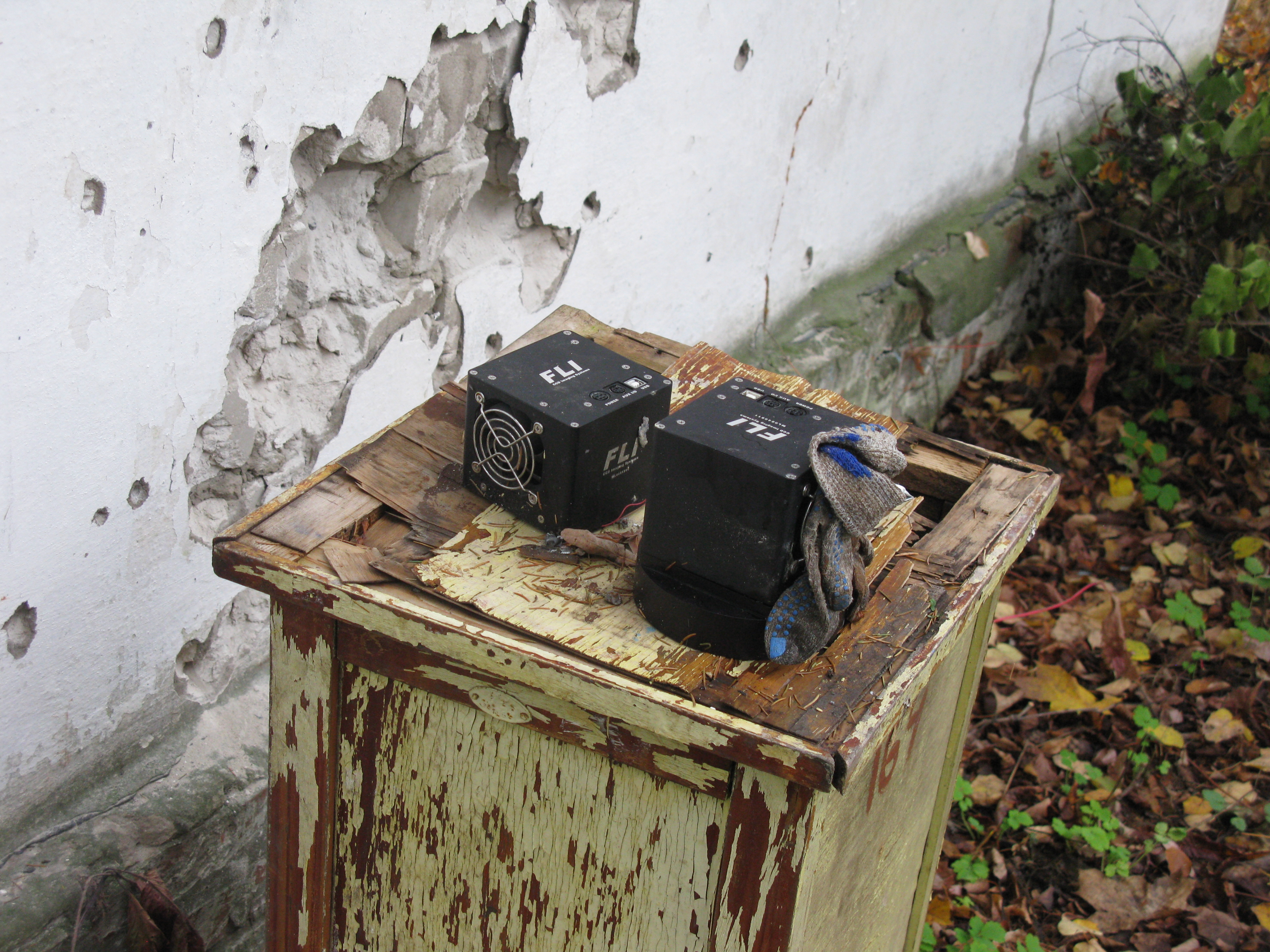
CCD-cameras removed from telescopes and used as shooting targets
