= Peter N. Fedorov =

Ukrainian astronomer

- Петро Миколайович Федоров
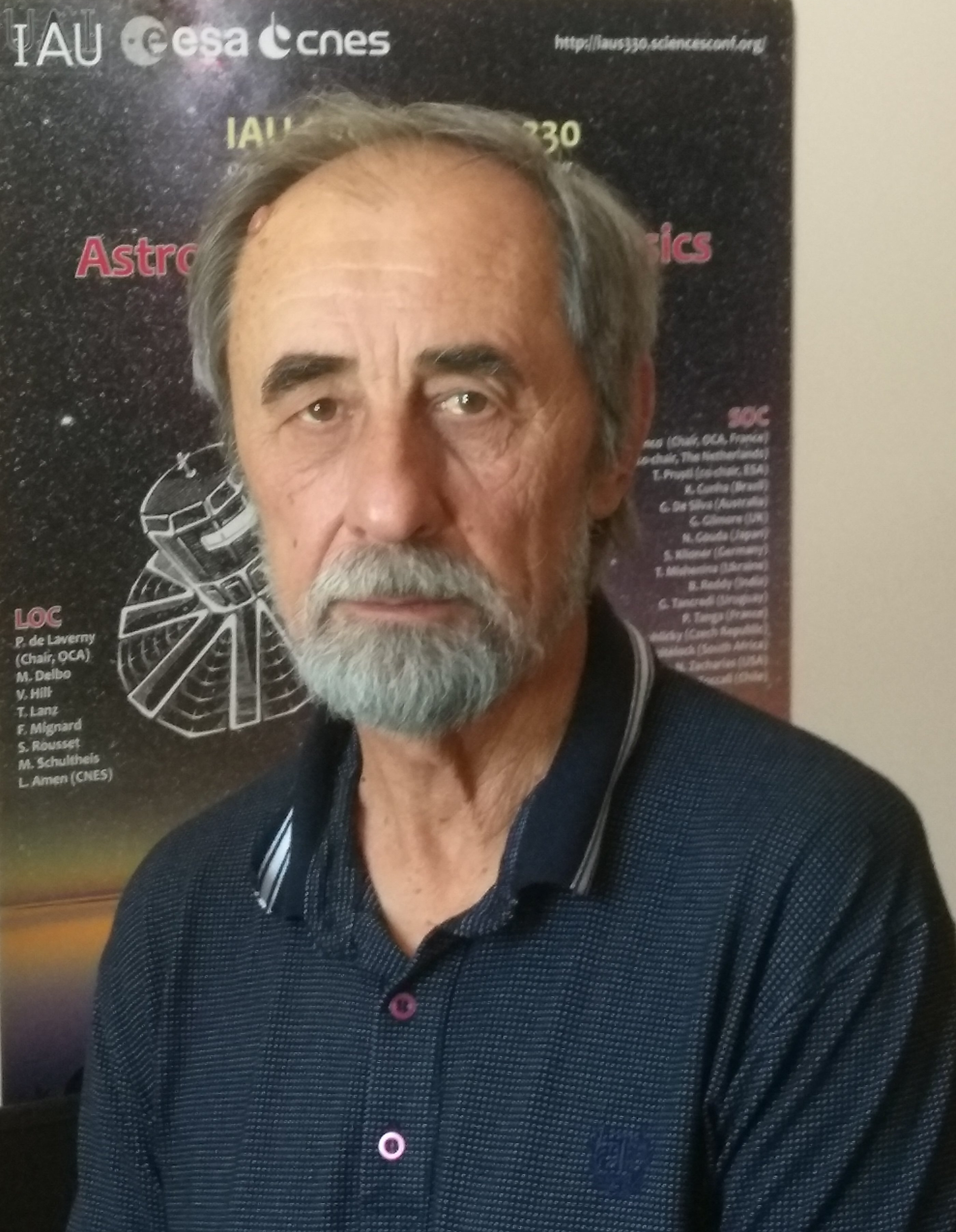
- Born: 20 May 1951; Soledar, Bakhmut Raion, Donetsk Oblast, Ukrainian SSR, USSR
- Citizenship: Soviet Union; Ukraine
- Education: Kharkiv University
- Scientific career
- Fields: Astronomy
- Workplaces: Kharkiv Observatory

Peter N. Fedorov (born 1951) is a Ukrainian astronomer, a specialist in astrometry and Galactic dynamics, known for his work on compiling the XPM star catalogue and determining the inertial coordinate system in the Milky Way. He is head of the Laboratory of Astrometry at Kharkiv Observatory and a professor of the Department of Astronomy and Space Informatics at the V. N. Karazin Kharkiv National University. He was awarded the Ye. P. Fedorov prize of the National Academy of Sciences of Ukraine for the series of works "Catalogues of stellar data as tools for astronomical research".

== Biography ==
In 1977, Fedorov graduated from the School of Physics of Kharkiv State University (now V. N. Karazin Kharkiv National University). In 1977-1995, he worked at Mykolaiv Observatory. In 1986, he defended his PhD thesis "Lateral refraction in daytime observations".

Since 1981, Fedorov has been one of the managers of the Mountain Astronomical Station in the Caucasus. Under his command, the Struve-Ertel meridian instrument was installed, which was used for daytime observations of the Sun, Venus, and Mercury in 1981-1991.

Since 1995, Fedorov has been working at Kharkiv Observatory, as a senior researcher, acting head of department, head of department, head of the Laboratory of Astrometry. In 2012, he defended his doctoral thesis "XPM catalogue as an independent realization of the extragalactic reference frame in the optical and near-infrared wavebands". In the same year, he received the Ye. P. Fedorov award of the National Academy of Sciences of Ukraine. The prize is named after his namesake, astrometrist Yevgen Pavlovych Fedorov from Kyiv.

Since 2003, Fedorov has been teaching astrometry at the Department of Astronomy of Kharkiv University. Since 2004, he was an associate professor, and since 2013 he is a professor.

== Honours and awards ==
- Ye. P. Fedorov award of the National Academy of Sciences of Ukraine for the series of works "Catalogues of stellar data as tools for astronomical research"(2012)

== Sources ==
- Peter N. Fedorov, Institute of Astronomy of Kharkiv University.
- Федоров Петро Миколайович, Фізичний факультет Харківського національного університету.
