= Honored Science and Technology Figure of Ukraine =

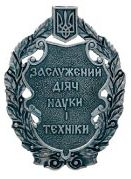
- Type: Honorary titles of Ukraine, Badge
- Awarded for: outstanding works in the field of science and technology, design and ergonomics that have received international recognition for training highly qualified researchers
- Country: Ukraine

Honored Science and Technology Figure of Ukraine is a Ukrainian state award and an honorary title, which is conferred by the President of Ukraine in accordance with the Law of Ukraine on State Awards. According to the Regulations on Honorary Titles of Ukraine dated June 29, 2001, this title is awarded to:

Scientists who hold a doctoral or candidate of sciences degree and have outstanding contributions in the fields of science and technology, design, and ergonomics, which have received international recognition, for their preparation of highly qualified scientific personnel

Individuals proposed for the award of the honorary title "Distinguished Figure in Science and Technology of Ukraine" must have a higher education degree at the specialist or master's level.

== History ==
The predecessor of this award was the title "Distinguished Figure in Science and Technology or Arts," established by the All-Ukrainian Central Executive Committee and the Central Executive Committee of the Ukrainian Soviet Socialist Republic on January 13, 1934. It was awarded for particularly valuable work in the fields of science and technology or for significant discoveries and inventions, or for outstanding scientific popularization activities. The conferral of the title was made solely by the resolution of the All-Ukrainian Central Executive Committee upon the recommendations of people's commissariats, the Central Executive Committee of the Moldavian Autonomous Soviet Socialist Republic, regional executive committees, republican trade unions, and other public organizations.

The name of the award has undergone several changes. According to the Regulation "On Honorary Titles of the Ukrainian SSR" approved by the Presidium of the Verkhovna Rada of the Ukrainian SSR on September 26, 1944, the titles "Honored Figure in Science of the Ukrainian SSR" (Заслужений діяч науки УРСР) and "Honored Figure in Science and Technology of the Ukrainian SSR" (Заслужений діяч науки і техніки УРСР) were conferred. In the resolution of the Presidium of the Verkhovna Rada of the Ukrainian SSR dated October 10, 1969, only the title "Honored Figure in Science of the Ukrainian SSR" (Заслужений діяч науки і техніки УРСР) was mentioned.

The title "Honored Figure in Science and Technology of the Ukrainian SSR" was an honorary title established initially on September 26, 1944. It existed until 1969, and it was reinstated by the Presidium of the Verkhovna Rada of the Ukrainian SSR on November 15, 1988.

Individuals who were awarded this honorary title received a breast badge made of silvered non-ferrous tombac. According to the decree of the Presidium of the Verkhovna Rada of the Ukrainian SSR, the breast badge was worn on the right side of the chest. The title "Honored Figure in Science and Technology of the Ukrainian SSR" was revoked by the Verkhovna Rada of Ukraine on May 17, 2001.
