= Kharkiv Observatory =

Kharkiv Astronomical Observatory
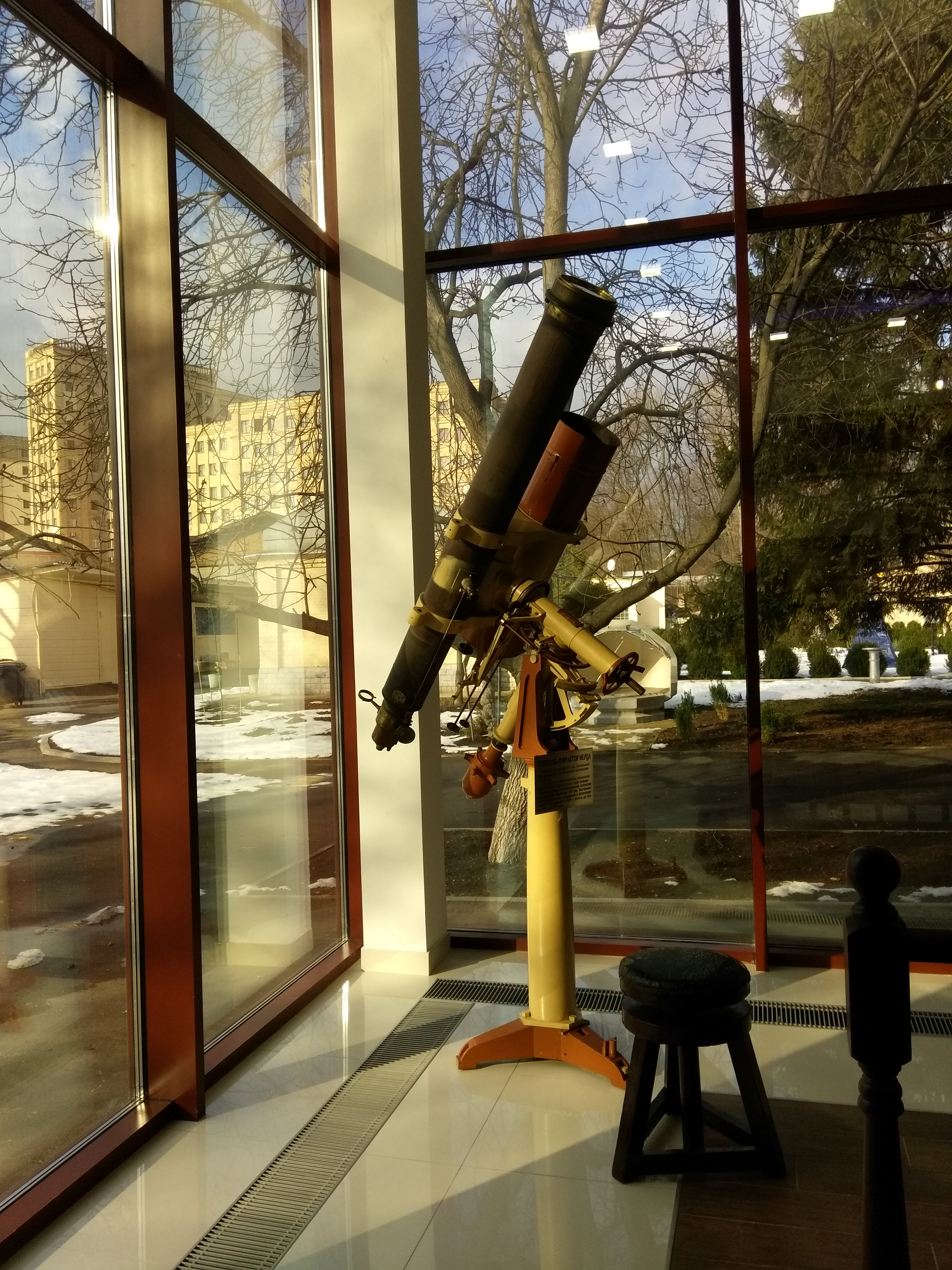
- In the Museum of Astronomy
- Alternative names: Kharkiv Astronomical Observatory
- Organization: Kharkiv National University
- Observatory code: 101
- Location: Kharkiv, Ukraine
- Coordinates: 50°50′09″N 36°13′51″E
- Altitude: 120 m (390 ft)
- Website: www.astron.kharkov.ua/index.html
- Related media on Commons

Institute of Astronomy of Kharkiv National University, or Kharkiv Astronomical Observatory — is a scientific institution at Kharkiv University. The institution was founded in 1808 as the astronomy laboratory of the university, and in 1888, mainly due to the efforts of Gregory Levitsky, a fully equipped observatory in a separate house was created.

At the present stage, the main topics of scientific research at the observatory are the laws of light scattering by the surfaces of celestial bodies, small bodies of the Solar System, star catalogs and stellar dynamics, as well as gravitational lenses. The astronomical observatory is subordinate to the observation station located in Chuguiv and the Museum of Astronomy.

== History ==
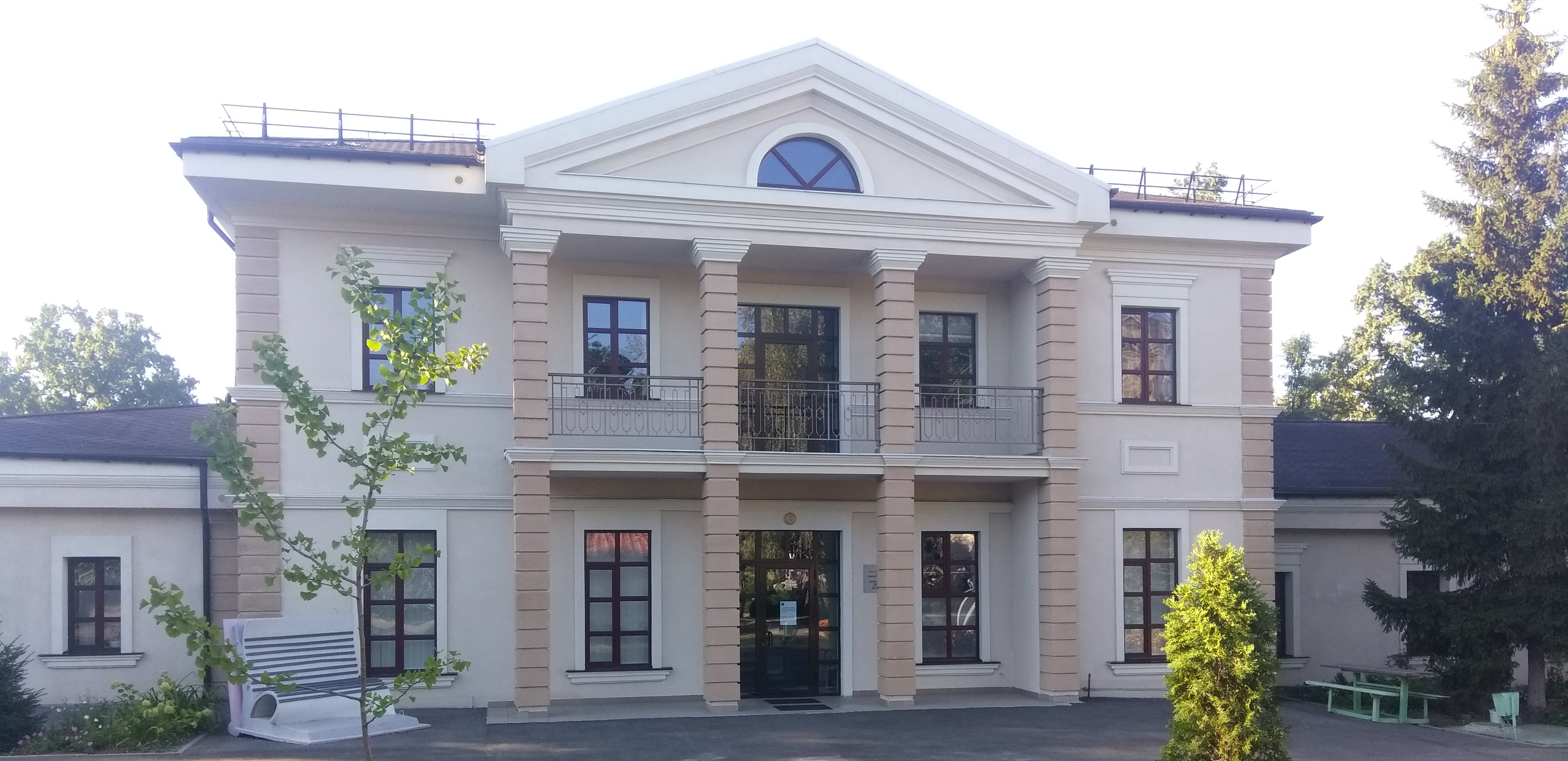
The main building of the observatory

In 1808, an astronomy office was established at Kharkiv University. In 1883, an observatory was established in a separate building on the initiative of Grigory Levytsky. In 1962, due to light pollution in Kharov, which did not allow for high-quality astronomical observations, an observation station was founded in the Chuguiv district. In 1963, an AZT-8 planetary telescope with a mirror diameter of 70 cm and an AFR-2 solar telescope were installed there.

In 2017, a new 2-story observatory building was opened, which contains offices for scientists, an assembly hall, a library, and classrooms for students of the Department of Astronomy and Space Informatics. In 2020, after reconstruction and expansion, the observatory museum of astronomy was opened in the new building. During the Russian invasion of Ukraine from March to September 2022, the Chuguiv Observatory was under Russian occupation. The equipment at the observatory was badly damaged and looted.

== Directors ==
- Grigori Levitski (1883—1894)
- Ludwig von Struve (1894—1917)
- Nikolai Yevdokimov (1917—1929)
- Nikolai P. Barabashov (1930—1971)
- Vladimir Yezerskiy (1971—1977)
- Vladimir Dudinov (1977—1993)
- Vladimir Zakhozhay (1993—2004)
- Yuriy G. Shkuratov (2004—2014)
- Vadym Kaydash (since 2014)

== Noted scientists ==
Famous Ukrainian astronomers have worked and still work at the Kharkiv Observatory:

Academicians:

- Nikolai P. Barabashov (Academy of Sciences of Ukrainian SSR)
- Vasily Fesenkov (Academy of Sciences of the Kazakh SSR)

Corresponding members:

- Yuriy G. Shkuratov (NAS of Ukraine)

Winners of State Prize of Ukraine in Science and Technology:

- 1986: Vladimir Dudinov, Dmitriy G. Stankevich, Victoria Tsvetkova, Yuriy G. Shkuratov
- 2010: Irina Belskaya, Vadym Kaydash, Dmitrij F. Lupishko

Winners of M. P. Barabashov Prize of the National Academy of Sciences of Ukraine:

- 1987: Leonid Akimov, Yuriy Aleksandrov, Dmitrij F. Lupishko
- 1997: Yuriy G. Shkuratov
- 2012: Fyodor Velichko, Yurij N. Krugly, Vasilij G. Shevchenko

Winners of S. Ya. Braude Prize of the National Academy of Sciences of Ukraine:

- 2010: Viktor Vakulik

Winners of Ye. P. Fedorov Prize of the National Academy of Sciences of Ukraine:

- 2012: Peter N. Fedorov

8 craters on the Moon, Mars and Venus, as well as a number of asteroids, are named in honor of the employees of the Kharkiv Observatory.

== Literature ==
- Шкуратов Ю. Г. 200 лет астрономии в Харьковском университете. — Харьков, 2008. — 632 с. — 500 прим.
- Балишев М.А. Астрономія в Харкові у роки громадянської війни періоду Української революції (1917-1921). Дослідження з історії і філософії науки і техніки. 2020. Т.29. №2. С.110-118.
- Балишев М.А. Харківська астрономічна обсерваторія під час німецької окупації (1941–1943) у роки Другої світової війни. Історія науки і біографістика. 2020. №3.
