= 1166 Sakuntala =

Main-belt asteroid

Discovery
- Discovered by: P. Parchomenko
- Discovery site: Simeiz Obs.
- Discovery date: 27 June 1930

Designations
- Named after: Shakuntala (Sanskrit drama)
- Alternative designations: 1930 MA · 1962 KA
- Minor planet category: main-belt · (inner)

Orbital characteristics
- Epoch 4 September 2017 (JD 2458000.5)
- Uncertainty parameter 0
- Observation arc: 86.75 yr (31,685 days)
- Aphelion: 3.0650 AU
- Perihelion: 2.0044 AU
- Semi-major axis: 2.5347 AU
- Eccentricity: 0.2092
- Orbital period (sidereal): 4.04 yr (1,474 days)
- Mean anomaly: 177.36°
- Mean motion: 0° 14^{m} 39.12^{s} / day
- Inclination: 18.924°
- Longitude of ascending node: 106.69°
- Argument of perihelion: 189.92°

Physical characteristics
- Dimensions: 22.70±5.56 km 25.78 km (derived); 26.011±0.181 km 26.32±0.39 km 28.74±0.9 km 29.249±0.130 km
- Synodic rotation period: 6.29±0.01 h 6.2915±0.0002 h 6.30±0.02 h 20 h
- Geometric albedo: 0.185±0.006; 0.22±0.11; 0.2270±0.0315; 0.286±0.047; 0.2914 (derived); 0.6460±0.040
- Spectral type: S
- Absolute magnitude (H): 8.80 · 9.9 · 10.40 · 10.56

1166 Sakuntala, provisional designation 1930 MA, is a stony background asteroid from the central regions of the asteroid belt, approximately 26 kilometers in diameter. Discovered by Praskovjya Parchomenko at Simeiz Observatory in 1930, the asteroid was named after the figure of Shakuntala from an ancient Indian drama.

== Discovery ==
Sakuntala was discovered by Soviet astronomer Praskovjya Parchomenko at the Simeiz Observatory on the Crimean peninsula on 27 June 1930. Two night later, it was independently discovered by German astronomer Karl Reinmuth at Heidelberg Observatory. The body's observation arc begins at Uccle Observatory in May 1938, or 8 years after its official discovery observation at Simeiz.

== Orbit and classification ==
The asteroid is a background asteroid, that is not a member of any known asteroid family. Sakuntala orbits the Sun in the central main-belt at a distance of 2.0–3.1 AU once every 4.04 years (1,474 days). Its orbit has an eccentricity of 0.21 and an inclination of 19° with respect to the ecliptic.

== Physical characteristics ==
Sakuntala has been characterized as a stony S-type asteroid.

=== Rotation period ===
Several rotational lightcurves of Sakuntala were obtained from photometric observations. Analysis of the best-rated lightcurve gave a rotation period of 6.29 hours with a brightness variation of 0.38 magnitude (U=3).

Other measurements gave a similar period of 6.2915 and 6.30 hours, respectively (U=3-/2), while lightcurves with a period of larger than 20 hours are considered to be wrong (U=1/1/1).

=== Diameter and albedo ===
According to the surveys carried out by the Infrared Astronomical Satellite IRAS, the Japanese Akari satellite and the NEOWISE mission of NASA's Wide-field Infrared Survey Explorer, Sakuntala measures between 22.70 and 29.249 kilometers in diameter and its surface has an albedo between 0.185 and 0.6460.

The Collaborative Asteroid Lightcurve Link derives an albedo of 0.2914 and a diameter of 25.78 kilometers based on an absolute magnitude of 9.9.

== Naming ==
This minor planet was named after the protagonist Shakuntala in the Sanskrit drama The Recognition of Shakuntala by Indian poet Kālidāsa. The drama is part of the Mahabharata, one of the major Sanskrit epics of ancient India.

The official naming citation was mentioned in The Names of the Minor Planets by Paul Herget in 1955 (H 108).
