= Yuriy G. Shkuratov =

Ukrainian astronomer

- Юрій Григорович Шкуратов
- Born: 23 September 1952; Ivano-Frankivsk, Ukrainian SSR
- Citizenship: Soviet Union; Ukraine
- Education: Kharkiv University
- Scientific career
- Fields: Astronomy
- Workplaces: Kharkiv Observatory
- Doctoral advisor: Leonid Akimov

Yuriy G. Shkuratov (born 1952) is a Ukrainian astronomer, specialist in the theory of light scattering by planetary surfaces. Corresponding member of the National Academy of Sciences of Ukraine (2012), winner of the State Prize of the Ukrainian SSR in Science and Technology (1986). Director of the Institute of Astronomy of Kharkiv National University (2004-2014), head of the Department of Astronomy and Space Informatics of Kharkiv National University (since 2012).

== Biography ==
Shkuratov was born on September 23, 1952, in the city of Stanislav (present-day Ivano-Frankivsk). In 1975, he graduated from School of Physics of the Kharkiv State University (now V. N. Karazin Kharkiv National University) with a degree in Physics.

Since 1975, he has been working at the Institute of Astronomy of Kharkiv National University. In 1980, he defended his PhD thesis "Some optical characteristics of the Moon: observation and interpretation". In 1987-1990, he was also head of the laboratory of the Vernadsky Institute of Geochemistry and Analytic Chemistry. In 1993, he defended his thesis of Doctor of Sciences on the topic "Backscattering of non-polarized light by randomly inhomogeneous surfaces". In 1993-2002, he was the head of the Department of Remote Sensing of planets at the Institute of Astronomy, and in 2004-2014, he was the Director of the Institute of Astronomy.

Since 2002 Shkuratov is Professor of the Department of Astronomy of School of Physics of Kharkiv National University, and since 2012 he is the head of the Department of Astronomy and Space Informatics.

== Scientific results ==
Shkuratov made a defining contribution to the theory of light scattering by regolith, in particular, he created the theory of coherent amplification during backscattering.

He studied Moon using data from the Galileo, Clementine, and Lunar Prospector spacecraft. He worked in the scientific group for processing polarimetric observations of Mars with the Hubble Space Telescope and in the group for data analysis of the European space project for lunar exploration Smart-1. Worked on the development of an unrealized Ukrainian scientific mission for up to Moon.

Shkuratov is a member of the editorial boards of the journals Journal of Quantitative Spectroscopy and Radiative Transfer and Kinematics and Physics of Celestial Bodies. He is a member of the International Astronomical Union working group on lunar nomenclature.

== Honours and awards ==
- State Prize of the Ukrainian SSR in Science and Technology (1986)
- Medal of Exhibition of Achievements of National Economy of the USSR
- Award of the National Academy of Sciences of Ukraine (1997)
- Award of the Russian Academy of Sciences (2000)
- The asteroid 12234 Shkuratov is named after the scientist

== Sources ==
- Бакіров В. С. (ред.). Шкуратов Юрій Григорович // Професори Харківського національного університету імені В. Н. Каразіна. Біобібліографічний довідник. — Харків : ХНУ ім. В. Н. Каразіна, 2009. — С. 342. — 700 прим.
- Шкуратов Юрій Григорович, фізичний факультет ХНУ ім. В. Н. Каразіна
- Shkuratov, Yuriy G. in Scopus
- Yuriy G. Shkuratov publications indexed by Google Scholar
