= 1129 Neujmina =

Eos asteroid

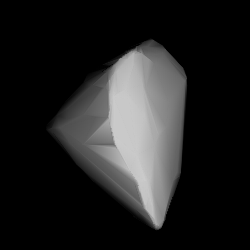
- Shape model of Neujmina from its lightcurve

Discovery
- Discovered by: P. Parchomenko
- Discovery site: Simeiz Obs.
- Discovery date: 8 August 1929

Designations
- Named after: Grigory Neujmin (Soviet astronomer)
- Alternative designations: 1929 PH · 1926 AE; A914 WE
- Minor planet category: main-belt · (outer); Eos

Orbital characteristics
- Epoch 4 September 2017 (JD 2458000.5)
- Uncertainty parameter 0
- Observation arc: 91.40 yr (33,384 days)
- Aphelion: 3.2714 AU
- Perihelion: 2.7734 AU
- Semi-major axis: 3.0224 AU
- Eccentricity: 0.0824
- Orbital period (sidereal): 5.25 yr (1,919 days)
- Mean anomaly: 204.95°
- Mean motion: 0° 11^{m} 15.36^{s} / day
- Inclination: 8.6174°
- Longitude of ascending node: 269.22°
- Argument of perihelion: 139.74°

Physical characteristics
- Mean diameter: 30.99±7.65 km 32.57±0.72 km 34.43±0.79 km 34.576±0.196 km 34.76±1.4 km 34.80 km (derived); 39.246±0.426 km
- Synodic rotation period: 5.0844±0.0006 h 5.089±0.004 h 7.61 h
- Geometric albedo: 0.0999±0.0141; 0.12±0.11; 0.1216±0.010; 0.1270 (derived); 0.133±0.007; 0.138±0.016
- Spectral type: Tholen = S; B–V = 0.780; U–B = 0.410
- Absolute magnitude (H): 10.15 · 10.20 · 10.33

1129 Neujmina (prov. designation: 1929 PH) is an Eos asteroid from the outer regions of the asteroid belt. It was discovered on 8 August 1929, by astronomer Praskoviya Parchomenko at the Simeiz Observatory on the Crimean peninsula. The stony S-type asteroid has a rotation period of 5.1 hours and measures approximately 34 kilometers (21 miles) in diameter. It was named after Soviet astronomer Grigory Neujmin.

== Orbit and classification ==
Neujmina is a member the Eos family (606), the largest asteroid family of the outer main belt consisting of nearly 10,000 asteroids. It orbits the Sun at a distance of 2.8–3.3 AU once every 5 years and 3 months (1,919 days). Its orbit has an eccentricity of 0.08 and an inclination of 9° with respect to the ecliptic. The asteroid was first identified as A914 WE at Simeiz in November 1911, followed by 1926 AE at Heidelberg in January 1926. The body's observation arc begins four weeks after its official discovery observation at Simeiz.

== Naming ==
This minor planet was named after Georgian–Russian astronomer Grigory Neujmin (1885–1946), a discoverer of minor planets and comets, observer at Pulkovo Observatory and college of Parchomenko at Simeiz Observatory. The naming was mentioned in The Names of the Minor Planets by Paul Herget in 1955 (H 106). The lunar crater Neujmin was also named in his honor.

== Physical characteristics ==
In the Tholen classification, Neujmina is a stony S-type asteroid.

=== Rotation period ===
In March 2011, a rotational lightcurve of Neujmina was obtained from photometric observations at the Oakley Southern Sky Observatory (E09) in Australia. Lightcurve analysis gave a well-defined rotation period of 5.0844 hours with a brightness variation of 0.20 magnitude (U=3). Previous measurements in 1984 and 2008, gave a period of 5.089 and 7.61 hours with an amplitude of 0.15 and 0.06 magnitude, respectively (U=2/2).

=== Diameter and albedo ===
According to the surveys carried out by the Infrared Astronomical Satellite IRAS, the Japanese Akari satellite and the NEOWISE mission of NASA's Wide-field Infrared Survey Explorer, Neujmina measures between 30.99 and 39.246 kilometers in diameter and its surface has an albedo between 0.0999 and 0.138. The Collaborative Asteroid Lightcurve Link derives an albedo of 0.1270 and a diameter of 34.80 kilometers based on an absolute magnitude of 10.15.
