= Evdokimov (crater) =

Crater on the Moon

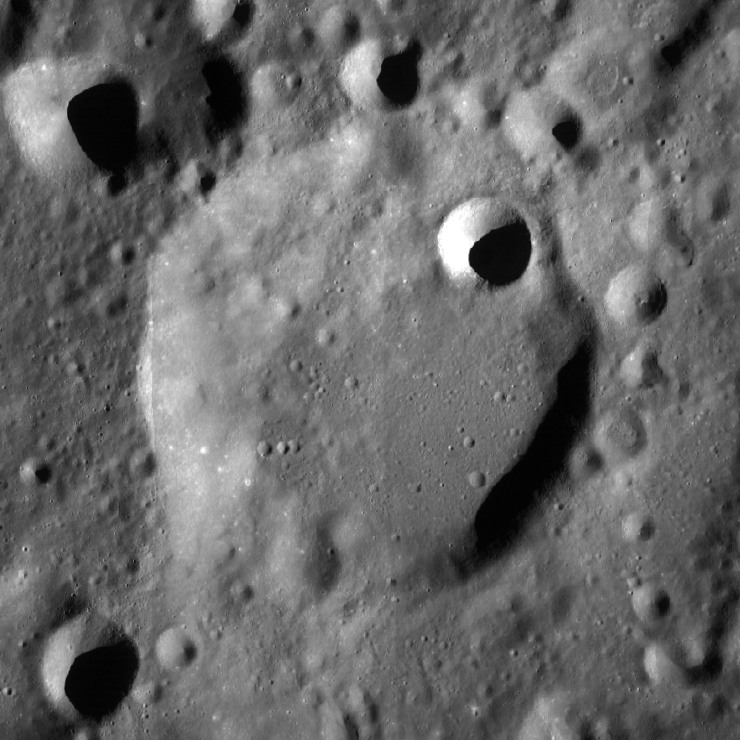
- LRO mosaic
- Coordinates: 34.8°N 153.0°W
- Diameter: 48.88 km (30.37 mi)
- Depth: Unknown
- Colongitude: 153° at sunrise
- Eponym: Nikolaj N. Evdokimov

Evdokimov is a lunar impact crater on the far side of the Moon. It lies to the east of the crater Evershed, and west-southwest of Gadomski.

This is a worn and eroded feature with a somewhat indistinct outer rim that is little more than a slight ridge in the surface. The rim is better formed along the western and eastern sides. A small crater with a relatively high albedo lies along the inner wall to the northeast, and is surrounded by a small, bright skirt of ejecta. The interior floor is nearly featureless, with only a few indistinct small crater rims marking the surface.

This formation is named after Soviet astronomer Nikolái Yevdokímov (1868-1940). Its designation was formally adopted by the International Astronomical Union in 1970.

== Satellite craters ==
By convention these features are identified on lunar maps by placing the letter on the side of the crater midpoint that is closest to Evdokimov.

Evdokimov	Latitude	Longitude	Diameter
G	33.9° N	150.5° W	48 km
N	31.7° N	153.7° W	27 km
