= Nikolai Barabashov =

Russian and Soviet astronomer

- Николай Барабашов
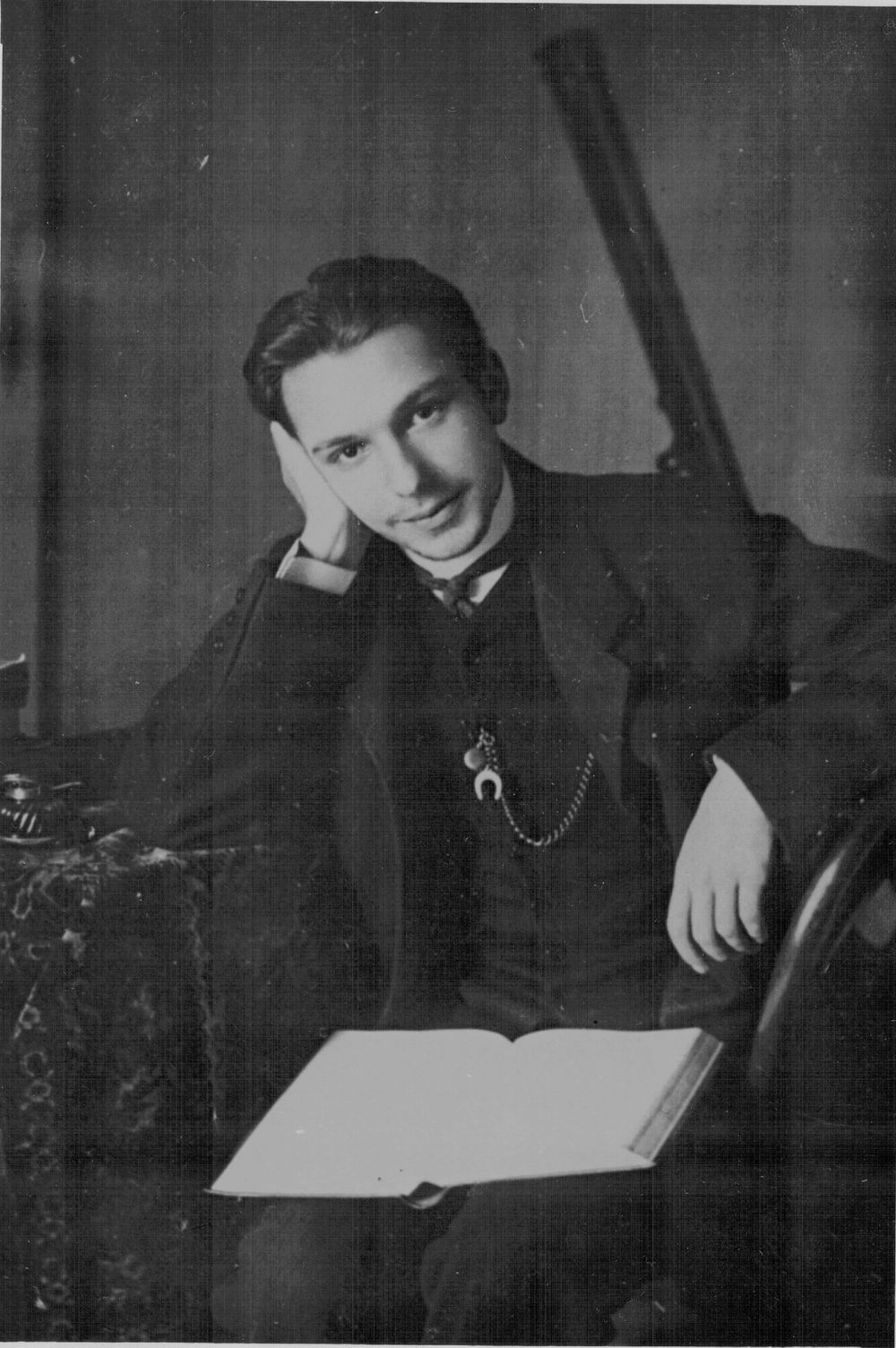
- Barabashov in 1914
- Born: Nikolai Pavlovich Barabashov; 30 March 1894; Kharkov, Russian Empire (now Kharkiv, Ukraine)
- Died: 29 April 1971 (aged 77); Kharkov, Ukrainian SSR, Soviet Union
- Citizenship: Russian Empire, Soviet Union
- Education: Kharkiv University
- Scientific career
- Fields: Astronomy
- Workplaces: Kharkiv Observatory, Kharkiv University

Nikolai Pavlovich Barabashov (Russian: Николай Павлович Барабашов; Ukrainian: Микола Павлович Барабашов, romanized: Mykola Pavlovych Barabashov; March 30, 1894 – April 29, 1971) was a Soviet astronomer.

Barabashov was born in Kharkov, Kharkov Governorate, Russian Empire (now Kharkiv, Ukraine). He graduated from Kharkiv University in 1919; served as Director, Kharkiv Observatory, 1930; Professor, Kharkiv University, 1934; Rector, Kharkiv University, 1943–1946. He became a member of the Ukrainian SSR Academy of Sciences in 1948.

He was a co-author of the ground breaking publication of the first pictures of the far side of the Moon in 1961, called Atlas of the Other Side of the Moon. Barabashov, crater on Mars, was named in his honor in 1973. 2883 Barabashov, a minor planet discovered in 1978 by Soviet astronomer Nikolai Chernykh, is named after him.

== Honours and awards ==
- Hero of Socialist Labour
- Four Orders of Lenin
- Order of the Red Banner of Labour

== Sources ==
- Astronomical Institute of Kharkiv National University
- Академик Барабашов Николай Павлович
