= Gennadiy Feldman =

- Born: October 15, 1947 (age 78); Kharkiv, Ukrainian SSR, Soviet Union
- Education: V.N. Karazin Kharkiv National University
- Known for: Algebraic Probability Theory
- Awards: Ostrogradsky prize of the National Academy of Sciences of Ukraine (2009); State Prize of Ukraine in Science and Technology (2018); Mitropolskiy prize of the National Academy of Sciences of Ukraine (2021)
- Scientific career
- Fields: Mathematics
- Workplaces: B. Verkin Institute for Low Temperature Physics and Engineering of the National Academy of Sciences of Ukraine
- Doctoral advisor: Yu. I. Lyubich

Gennadiy Mykhailovych Feldman (Ukrainian: Геннадій Михайлович Фельдман; born October 15, 1947, Kharkiv) is a Soviet and Ukrainian mathematician, corresponding member of the National Academy of Sciences of Ukraine, Doctor of Science in Physics and Mathematics, Professor, Head of the Mathematical Division of B. Verkin Institute for Low Temperature Physics and Engineering of the National Academy of Sciences of Ukraine.

== Biography ==
In 1970, Feldman graduated in the Faculty of Mechanics and Mathematics of V. N. Karazin Kharkiv National University. From 1970 to 1973, he was a PhD student at B. Verkin Institute for Low Temperature Physics and Engineering. In 1973, he defended his thesis Harmonic Analysis of Non-unitary Representations of Locally Compact Abelian Groups (supervisor Prof. Yu. I. Lyubich) and obtained the degree of Candidate of Sciences (PhD). He has been working at B. Verkin Institute for Low Temperature Physics and Engineering, starting as a junior researcher and heading the Mathematical Division in 2012. In 1985, he defended his doctoral thesis, Arithmetic of Probability Measures on Locally Compact Abelian groups at Vilnius University and obtained the degree of Doctor of Sciences (Dr. Hab.). In 2018, he was elected as a corresponding member of the National Academy of Sciences of Ukraine. For more than 20 years, Feldman worked part-time at the Faculty of Mechanics and Mathematics of V. N. Karazin Kharkiv National University. He is the author of 5 monographs and more than 100 scientific articles.

== Research ==
Feldman’s research interests are related to abstract harmonic analysis and the algebraic theory of probability. He obtained fundamental results in the theory of decompositions of random variables on locally compact Abelian groups. Before the beginning of his research in this field, only a few isolated works existed. In particular, Feldman proved group analogues of Cramér’s theorem on the decomposition of Gaussian distributions and of Linnik’s theorem on the decomposition of convolutions of Gaussian and Poisson distributions (jointly with A. E. Fryntov). He proved analogues of the classical characterization theorems of mathematical statistics (Kac–Bernstein theorem, Darmois–Skitovich theorem, Heyde theorem) in the case where random variables take values in various classes of locally compact Abelian groups (discrete, compact totally disconnected, the field of p-adic numbers, and others).

== Awards ==
- Ostrogradsky prize of the National Academy of Sciences of Ukraine (2009) for the series of works “Probabilistic Problems on Groups and in Spectral Theory” (together with L. Pastur and M. Shcherbina).
- State Prize of Ukraine in Science and Technology (2018) for the work “Qualitative methods of research models of mathematical physics” (together with A. Kochubey, M. Shcherbina, O. Rebenko, I. Mykytyuk, V. Samojlenko, A. Prykarpatskyj).
- Mitropolskiy prize of the National Academy of Sciences of Ukraine (2021) for the series of works “New analytical methods in the theory of nonlinear oscillations, the theory of random matrices and in characterization problems” (together with V. Slyusarchuk and M. Shcherbina).

== Monographs ==
- Г. М. Фельдман. Арифметика вероятностных распределений и характеризационные задачи на абелевых группах, Киев: Наукова думка, 1990, 168 с.
- G.M. Fel'dman. Arithmetic of probability distributions, and characterization problems on Abelian groups, Transl. Math. Monographs. Vol. 116, Providence, RI: American Mathematical Society, 1993, 223 p.
- Gennadiy Feldman. Functional equations and characterization problems on locally compact Abelian groups, EMS Tracts in Mathematics 5, Zurich: European Mathematical Society, 2008, 268 p.
- Г. М. Фельдман. Характеризационные задачи математической статистики на локально компактных абелевых группах, Киев: Наукова думка, 2010, 432 с.
- Gennadiy Feldman. Characterization of Probability Distributions on Locally Compact Abelian Groups. Mathematical Surveys and Monographs. Vol. 273, Providence, RI: American Mathematical Society, 2023, 240 pp.
