= Kharkiv Mathematical Society =

- Харківське математичне товариство
- Formation: 1879; 147 years ago
- Location: Svobody Square, 4, Kharkiv, Kharkivs'ka oblast, Ukraine, 61000 Ukraine
- Fields: Mathematics
- Official language: ukr
- Affiliations: European Mathematical Society
- Website: kharkiv-math.loegria.net

The Kharkiv Mathematical Society (Ukrainian: Харківське математичне товариство, romanized: Kharkivske matematychne tovarystvo, Russian: Харьковское математическое общество) is an association of professional mathematicians in Kharkiv aimed at advancement of mathematical research and education, popularizing achievements of mathematics. The structure of the Society includes mathematicians of Verkin Institute for Low Temperature Physics and Engineering, V. N. Karazin Kharkiv National University and other higher educational institutions of Kharkiv.

== History and members of the Kharkiv Mathematical Society ==
Kharkov Mathematical Society was established in 1879 at Kharkov University by the initiative of Vasilii Imshenetskii, who also later founded the St. Petersburg Mathematical Society. According to the statute of the society, "the aim of the Kharkov Mathematical Society was to support the development of mathematical science and education".

From 1885 to 1902 in Kharkov lived and worked an outstanding Russian mathematician, Aleksandr Lyapunov: during this period, Lyapunov's activities played an important role in the development of the Society. From 1902 to 1906, the Kharkov Mathematical Society was headed by Vladimir Steklov, the outstanding student of Aleksandr Lyapunov, who later organized and became the first director of the Institute of Physics and Mathematics of the Russian Academy of Sciences in Moscow.

Since 1906 and for the next almost forty years the Society was headed by a well-known geometer Dmitrii Sintsov. Due to his initiatives, the activities of the Society significantly contributed to the improvement of mathematical education in Kharkov.

In 1933 Naum Akhiezer had moved to Kharkov and headed the Institute of Mathematics. From 1947 Akhiezer became the head of KMS. Thanks to his efforts, the mathematical community of Kharkiv has significantly strengthened.

Later, the Society was headed by Aleksei Pogorelov, Vladimir Marchenko, Iossif Ostrovskii. Currently, the president of the Society is Yeugen Kruslov.

At different times, members of society were Konstantin Andreev, Naum Akhiezer, Yeugen von Beyer, Sergei Bernstein, Yakov Blank, Alexander Borisenko, Valentina Borok, Dmitry Grave, Israel Glazman, Vladimir Drinfeld, Gershon Drinfeld, Alexandre Eremenko, Emmanuil Zhmud, Vladimir Kadets, Mikhail Kadets, Viktor Kirpichov, Mark Krein, Lev Landau, Naum Landkof, Boris Levin, Boris Levitan, Mikhail Livsic, Yury Lyubich, Aleksandr Lyapunov, Vladimir Marchenko, Anatoly Myshkis, Iossif Ostrovskii, Leonid Pastur, Alexander Povzner, Aleksei Pogorelov, Dmitrii Sintsov, Vladimir Steklov, Anton Sushkevich, Gennady Feldman, Yeugen Kruslov, Igor Chueshov, Dmitry Shepelsky, Maria Scherbina.

In 1990 Vladimir Drinfeld was awarded by Fields Medal.

== Publishing activities of the Society ==
Almost immediately after the foundation, since 1880, the Society published the Communications of the Kharkov Mathematical Society (Russian: Сообщения и протоколы заседаний математического общества при Императорском Харьковском университете). At first, there were two issues a year in size ranging from two to five printed sheets. In 1960, the publications of the Communications of the Kharkov Mathematical Society were suspended. Later, in 1965 due to the efforts of Naum Akhiezer the journal Theory of functions, functional analysis and applications was founded, which was published until 1992. From 1994 to 1999 the Kharkiv Mathematical Society participated in the publication of the journal Mathematical Physics, Analysis and Geometry.

== Bibliography ==
- Ostrovskii, I. V. (December 1999), "Kharkov Mathematical Society" (PDF), European Mathematical Society Newsletter, 34: 26–27, archived from the original (PDF) on 2011-09-28
- Maggi, Gian Antonio (1910), "Giacinto Morera", Giornale di Matematiche di Battaglini (in Italian), 48 (3 1): 317–324, JFM 41.0023.06. This paper is an Italian translation by the author of an original commemorative paper in Russian, published in the Maggi, Gian Antonio (1910), "Джачинто Морера", Сообщенія Харьковскаго Математическаго Общества (Communications de la Société Mathématique de Kharkoff), 11 (2): 243–248
- O'Connor, John J.; Robertson, Edmund F. (August 2004), "The Kharkov Mathematical Society", MacTutor History of Mathematics Archive, University of St Andrews
- B Verkin Institute for Low Temperature Physics and Engineering, (ILTPE), Mathematics in Kharkov (in Russian)
- Akhiezer, N.I., Kharkiv Mathematical Society, Russian: Ахиезер Н. И. Харьковское математическое общество / Записки Математического отделения физико-математического факультета ХГУ им. А.М. Горького и Харьковского математического общества. — 1956. — Серия.4 т. XXIV. — с. 31–39.
- Russian: Гордевский Д. З. Педагогическая деятельность Харьковского математического общества за 90 лет его существования (1879–1969) / Вопросы методологии и методики преподавания в высшей школе. — Харьков, 1973. — вып.2 — с. 107–116.
- Russian: Марческий М. Н. Харьковское математическое общество за 75 лет // Историко-математические исследования. — М., 1956. — вып. IX. — с. 613–666.
- Web-site of Kharkiv Mathematical Society
