= Mathematical Division of B. Verkin Institute for Low Temperature Physics and Engineering =

Soviet-Ukrainian research institute

- Established: 1960
- Director: Gennady Feldman
- Location: Kharkiv, Ukraine
- Website: Mathematical Division of ILTPE
- 47 Nauky Ave., Kharkiv 61103, Ukraine

The Mathematical Division of B. Verkin Institute for Low Temperature Physics and Engineering — is a part of Mathematical Division of NASU , one of the leading Ukrainian mathematical centers, where fundamental research in mathematics is conducted.

The main research areas of the Mathematical Division are:

- mathematical physics;
- differential equations;
- geometry;
- function theory and functional analysis.

== History ==
Formally, the Mathematical Division of Institute for Low Temperature Physics and Engineering was established by a decree of the Presidium of the Academy of Sciences of the Ukrainian SSR dated October 5, 1987. However, the mathematical departments appeared at the Institute almost simultaneously with its foundation in 1960. At that time there were 5 mathematical departments in the Institute:

- function theory, headed by Naum Akhiezer;
- mathematical physics, headed by Vladimir Marchenko;
- geometry, headed by Aleksei Pogorelov;
- applied mathematics (from 1962), headed by Anatoly Myshkis;
- functional analysis and computational mathematics (from 1963), headed by Israel Glazman.

In the mathematical departments of the Institute at various times had worked and work now such well-known mathematicians as Yuri Aminov, Vladimir Drinfeld, Alexandr Eremenko, Boris Levin, Anatoly Milka, Iosif Ostrovskii, Leonid Pastur, Lev Ronkin, Fedor Rofe-Beketov, Mikhail Sodin, Yeugen Kruslov, Maria Scherbina, and others.

In 1990, Vladimir Drinfeld, who worked at the Mathematical Division from 1981 to 1999, was awarded by Fields Medal.

== Heads of the Mathematical Division ==
- Leonid Pastur: 1987—1998.
- Yeugen Kruslov: 1998—2012.
- Gennadiy Feldman: from 2012.

== Structure of the Division ==
- Department of Mathematical Physics
- Department of Differential Equations and Geometry
- Department of Function Theory

== Publishing ==
Since 2005, «Journal of Mathematical Physics, Analysis, Geometry» (formerly «Matematicheskaya Fizika, Analiz, Geometriya», until July 2005) is being published (four times a year). The journal is indexed by major scientometric databases.

== Bibliography ==
- Official web site of Mathematical Division of B.Verkin Institute for Low Temperature Physics and Engineering of the National Academy of Sciences of Ukraine
- Maslov K.V, Pastur L.A., «B. Verkin and Mathematical Division of ILTPE» Russian: К. В. Маслов, Л. А. Пастур, «Б. И. Веркин и Математическое отделение ФТИНТа» з книги «Б. И. Веркин, каким мы его помним», Киев, Наукова думка, 2007
- Kruslov Y.Y., «Formation of the Mathematical Division» Russian: Е. Я. Хруслов, «Становление математического отделения» из книги «50 лет ФТІНТ», Наукова думка, 2010
- Scientometric profile of «Journal of Mathematical Physics, Analysis, Geometry» in Google Scholar
