= Journal of Mathematical Physics, Analysis, Geometry =

- Discipline: Pure mathematics
- Language: English, Ukrainian, Russian
- Edited by: Leonid Pastur

Publication details
- History: 1994–present
- Publisher: Verkin Institute for Low Temperature Physics and Engineering (Ukraine)
- Frequency: Quarterly
- Impact factor: 0.531 (2017)

Standard abbreviations
- ISO 4: J. Math. Phys. Anal. Geom.

Indexing
- ISSN: 1812-9471 (print); 1817-5805 (web)
- OCLC no.: 649047843

Links
- Journal homepage

The Journal of Mathematical Physics, Analysis, Geometry is a quarterly peer-reviewed scientific journal covering mathematics as applied to physics. It is published by the Verkin Institute for Low Temperature Physics and Engineering and was established in 1994 as Mathematical Physics, Analysis, Geometry. Papers are published in English, Ukrainian, and Russian. The journal is abstracted and indexed by Scopus. According to the Journal Citation Reports, the journal has a 2017 impact factor of 0.531.

== Editors-in-chief ==
The following persons are or have been editors-in-chief:

- Vladimir Marchenko: 1994—1999
- Iossif Ostrovskii: 2000—2004
- Leonid Pastur: 2005—present

== History ==
The Kharkov Mathematical Society was founded in 1879 and, starting in 1880, the society published the journal named Communications of the Kharkov Mathematical Society (Russian Сообщения и протоколы заседаний математического общества при Императорском Харьковском университете). Publication was suspended in 1960, but in 1965 due to the efforts of Naum Akhiezer the journals Theory of functions, functional analysis and their applications, and Ukrainian Geometric Collection» were established. In 1994, these journals were merged by the Mathematical Division of the Verkin Institute to establish the current journal. The first editor was Vladimir Marchenko.
