= Heyde theorem =

The Heyde theorem is one of the well-known characterization theorems in mathematical statistics. According to the classical Kac–Bernstein theorem, if the sum and the difference of independent random variables are independent, then these random variables have Gaussian distributions (i.e., are normally distributed). A generalization of this statement is the Skitovich–Darmois theorem, in which linear forms of $n$ independent random variables are considered instead of the sum and the difference. In Heyde's theorem, the Gaussian distribution is characterized by the symmetry of the conditional distribution of one linear form given another. The theorem was proved in 1970 by C. C. Heyde; see also.

== Statement of the theorem ==
Let $\xi_j, j = 1, 2, \ldots, n,$ be independent random variables, and let $\alpha_j, \beta_j$ be nonzero constants such that $\beta_i \alpha_i^{-1}+\beta_j \alpha_j^{-1} \ne 0$ for all $i \ne j$. If the conditional distribution of the linear form $L_2 = \beta_1\xi_1 + \cdots + \beta_n\xi_n$ given $L_1 = \alpha_1\xi_1 + \cdots + \alpha_n\xi_n$ is symmetric, then all random variables $\xi_j$ have Gaussian distributions.

The proof of the theorem relies on Cramér's decomposition theorem for the Gaussian distribution, as well as on the following theorem of Marcinkiewicz: if, in a neighborhood of zero, the logarithm of the characteristic function of a distribution is a polynomial, then the distribution is Gaussian.

== Generalizations to locally compact Abelian groups ==
Numerous works have been devoted to generalizing Heyde's theorem to the case where independent random variables take values in a locally compact Abelian group and the coefficients of the linear forms are topological automorphisms of the group. A survey of these results can be found in. As an example, one of the group analogues of Heyde's theorem is given below.

Theorem. Let $X$ be a second countable locally compact Abelian group containing no elements of order 2. Let $\mathrm{Aut}(X)$ denote the group of topological automorphisms of $X$, and let $\xi_j, j = 1, 2, \dots, n,$ be independent random variables taking values in $X$ with distributions $\mu_j$ whose characteristic functions do not vanish. Let $\alpha_j, \beta_j \in \mathrm{Aut}(X)$ and assume that $\beta_i \alpha_i^{-1} \pm \beta_j \alpha_j^{-1} \in \mathrm{Aut}(X)$ for all $i \ne j$. If the conditional distribution of the linear form $L_2 = \beta_1 \xi_1 + \dots + \beta_n \xi_n$ given $L_1 = \alpha_1 \xi_1 + \dots + \alpha_n \xi_n$ is symmetric, then all distributions $\mu_j$ are Gaussian.

The proof relies on group analogues of Cramér's decomposition theorem for the Gaussian distribution and the Marcinkiewicz theorem.
