= Linnik class =

Class of distributions

The Linnik class $I_0$ is one of the central concepts in the arithmetic of probability distributions. Following Yuri Vladimirovich Linnik, denote by $I_0$ the class of distributions that have no indecomposable divisors. Examples of distributions belonging to the class $I_0$ include normal distributions (Cramér's decomposition theorem), Poisson distributions (Raikov's theorem), as well as their convolutions (Linnik's theorem).

== Properties distributions of the Linnik class ==
Let $\mu \in I_0$. Then, according to Khinchin's second theorem, the distribution $\mu$ is infinitely divisible. Hence, by the Lévy formula, its characteristic function can be represented in the form

$\hat\mu(s)=\exp\left\{i\beta s - \sigma s^2 + \int\limits_{\mathbb{R}\backslash \{0\}} \left(e^{ixs} - 1 - {ixs \over 1 +x^2}\right)dF(x)\right\}, \quad\quad\quad (1)$

where $\beta\in \mathbb{R}$, $\sigma \ge 0$, and $F$ is a Borel measure on $\mathbb{R}\setminus\{0\}$ satisfying the condition $\int_{\mathbb{R}\backslash \{0\}} {x^2\over {1+x^2}}dF(x)<\infty.$ The measure $F$ is called the Lévy spectral measure of the infinitely divisible distribution $\mu$. The central problem in the arithmetic of probability distributions is to determine conditions on $\sigma$ and $F$ that are necessary and sufficient for an infinitely divisible distribution $\mu$ to belong to the class $I_0$.

Denote by $\mathfrak{L}$ the class of infinitely divisible distributions $\mu$ having the property that the Lévy spectral measure $F$ in (1) is discrete and concentrated on a set of the form

$\{\mu_{k1}\}_{k=-\infty}^\infty \cup \{\mu_{k2}\}_{k=-\infty}^\infty,$

where $\mu_{k1}>0$, $\mu_{k2}<0$, and the numbers $\mu_{k+1, r}/\mu_{k, r}$, $r=1, 2$, $k=0, \pm 1, \pm 2, \dots$, are natural numbers different from 1.

The following remarkable theorem is due to Yu. V. Linnik.

Theorem 1. Let $\mu$ be an infinitely divisible distribution and suppose that in formula (1), $\sigma>0$. If $\mu\in I_0$, then $\mu\in \mathfrak{L}$.

Note that there exist distributions belonging to the class $\mathfrak{L}$ but not to $I_0$. A corresponding example was constructed in. On the other hand, under the additional assumption of rapid decay of the quantity $\int_{|x|> y} dF (x)$ as $y \rightarrow\infty$, membership in the class $\mathfrak{L}$ implies membership in the class $I_0$.

We present two results concerning membership in the class $I_0$ of a generalized Poisson distribution, i.e., an infinitely divisible distribution $\mu$ such that in (1), $\sigma=0$ and the Lévy spectral measure $F$ is finite.

Theorem 2. Suppose that in (1), $\sigma=0$, the Lévy spectral measure $F$ is finite and concentrated on the interval $(a, b)$, where $0<a<b\le 2a$. Then $\mu\in I_0$.

Theorem 3. Suppose that in (1), $\sigma=0$, the Lévy spectral measure $F$ is finite and concentrated on a set of independent points. Then $\mu\in I_0$.

The following two theorems describe the properties of the class $I_0$ as a subclass of the class of all infinitely divisible distributions.

Theorem 4. The class $I_0$ is dense (in the weak topology) in the class of all infinitely divisible distributions.

Theorem 5. Any infinitely divisible distribution can be represented as a finite or countable convolution of distributions belonging to the class $I_0$.
