= Darmois–Skitovich theorem =

Theorem in mathematical statistics

The Darmois–Skitovich theorem is one of the most well-known characterization theorems in mathematical statistics. It characterizes the normal distribution (the Gaussian distribution) by the independence of two linear forms of $n$ independent random variables. The theorem was proved independently in 1953 by V. P. Skitovich and Georges Darmois, see also, where some of its generalizations can be found.

== Statement of the theorem ==
Let $\xi_j, j = 1, 2, \dots, n$, be independent random variables, and let $\alpha_j, \beta_j$ be nonzero constants. If the linear forms $L_1 = \alpha_1\xi_1 + \dots + \alpha_n\xi_n$ and $L_2 = \beta_1\xi_1 + \dots + \beta_n\xi_n$ are independent, then the random variables $\xi_j$ are normally distributed (Gaussian).

The Darmois–Skitovich theorem is a generalization of the Kac–Bernstein theorem, in which the normal distribution is characterized by the independence of the sum and difference of two independent random variables.

A result closely related to the Darmois–Skitovich theorem was proved in 1970 by C. C. Heyde, where the Gaussian distribution is characterized by the symmetry of the conditional distribution of one linear form of $n$ independent random variables given another.

== Generalizations to locally compact Abelian groups ==
The Darmois–Skitovich theorem has been extended in various directions. In particular, many works are devoted to its generalization to the case where independent random variables take values in a locally compact Abelian group and the coefficients of the linear forms are topological automorphisms of the group. A survey of a significant part of these results can be found in. A typical example of a group analogue of the Darmois–Skitovich theorem is the following result.

Theorem. Let $X$ be a second countable locally compact Abelian group containing no subgroups topologically isomorphic to the circle group. Let $\xi_j, j = 1, 2, \dots, n$, be independent random variables taking values in $X$ with distributions $\mu_j$ whose characteristic functions do not vanish. Let $\alpha_j, \beta_j$ be topological automorphisms of $X$. If the linear forms $L_1 = \alpha_1\xi_1 + \dots + \alpha_n\xi_n$ and $L_2 = \beta_1\xi_1 + \dots + \beta_n\xi_n$ are independent, then all distributions $\mu_j$ are Gaussian.

The proof of the theorem relies on group analogues of Cramér's decomposition theorem and the Marcinkiewicz theorem.

== See also ==
- Heyde theorem
