= Indecomposable distribution =

Probability distribution

In probability theory, an indecomposable distribution is a probability distribution that cannot be represented as the distribution of the sum of two or more non-constant independent random variables: Z ≠ X + Y. If it can be so expressed, it is decomposable: Z = X + Y. If, further, it can be expressed as the distribution of the sum of two or more independent identically distributed random variables, then it is divisible: Z = X_{1} + … + X_{k}.

== Examples ==
=== Indecomposable ===
- The simplest examples are Bernoulli-distributions: if

$$X = \begin{cases}
1 & \text{with probability } p, \\
0 & \text{with probability } 1-p,
\end{cases}$$

then the probability distribution of X is indecomposable.
Proof: Given non-constant distributions U and V, so that U assumes at least two values a, b and V assumes two values c, d, with a < b and c < d, then U + V assumes at least three distinct values: a + c, a + d, b + d (b + c may be equal to a + d, for example if one uses 0, 1 and 0, 1). Thus the sum of non-constant distributions assumes at least three values, so the Bernoulli distribution is not the sum of non-constant distributions.

- Suppose a + b + c = 1, a, b, c ≥ 0, and

$$X = \begin{cases}
2 & \text{with probability } a, \\
1 & \text{with probability } b, \\
0 & \text{with probability } c.
\end{cases}$$

This probability distribution is decomposable (as the distribution of the sum of two Bernoulli-distributed random variables) if

$$\sqrt{a} + \sqrt{c} \le 1 \$$

and otherwise indecomposable. To see, this, suppose U and V are independent random variables and U + V has this probability distribution. Then we must have

$$\begin{matrix}
U = \begin{cases}
1 & \text{with probability } p, \\
0 & \text{with probability } 1 - p,
\end{cases}
& \mbox{and} &
V = \begin{cases}
1 & \text{with probability } q, \\
0 & \text{with probability } 1 - q,
\end{cases}
\end{matrix}$$

for some p, q ∈ [0, 1], by similar reasoning to the Bernoulli case (otherwise the sum U + V will assume more than three values). It follows that

$$a = pq, \,$$
$$c = (1-p)(1-q), \,$$
$$b = 1 - a - c. \,$$

This system of two quadratic equations in two variables p and q has a solution (p, q) ∈ [0, 1]^{2} if and only if

$$\sqrt{a} + \sqrt{c} \le 1. \$$

Thus, for example, the discrete uniform distribution on the set {0, 1, 2} is indecomposable, but the binomial distribution for two trials each having probabilities 1/2, thus giving respective probabilities a, b, c as 1/4, 1/2, 1/4, is decomposable.

- An absolutely continuous indecomposable distribution. It can be shown that the distribution whose density function is

$$f(x) = {1 \over \sqrt{2\pi\,}} x^2 e^{-x^2/2}$$

is indecomposable.

=== Decomposable ===
- All infinitely divisible distributions are a fortiori decomposable; in particular, this includes the stable distributions, such as the normal distribution.
- The uniform distribution on the interval [0, 1] is decomposable, since it is the sum of the Bernoulli variable that assumes 0 or 1/2 with equal probabilities and the uniform distribution on [0, 1/2]. Iterating this yields the infinite decomposition:

$$\sum_{n=1}^\infty {X_n \over 2^n },$$

where the independent random variables X_{n} are each equal to 0 or 1 with equal probabilities – this is a Bernoulli trial of each digit of the binary expansion.

- A sum of indecomposable random variables is decomposable into the original summands. But it may turn out to be infinitely divisible. Suppose a random variable Y has a geometric distribution

$$\Pr(Y = n) = (1-p)^n p\,$$

on {0, 1, 2, ...}.

For any positive integer k, there is a sequence of negative-binomially distributed random variables Y_{j}, j = 1, ..., k, each with parameters p and non-integer r = 1/k, such that Y_{1} + ... + Y_{k} has this geometric distribution. Therefore, this distribution is infinitely divisible.

On the other hand, let D_{n} be the nth binary digit of Y, for n ≥ 0. Then the D_{n}'s are independent and

$$Y = \sum_{n=1}^\infty 2^n D_n,$$

and each term in this sum is indecomposable.

== Related concepts ==
At the other extreme from indecomposability is infinite divisibility.

- Cramér's theorem shows that while the normal distribution is infinitely divisible, it can only be decomposed into normal distributions.
- Cochran's theorem shows that the terms in a decomposition of a sum of squares of normal random variables into sums of squares of linear combinations of these variables always have independent chi-squared distributions.

== See also ==
- Cramér's theorem
- Cochran's theorem
- Infinite divisibility (probability)
- Khinchin's theorem on the factorization of distributions
