= Anatolii I. Zvyagin =

Soviet physicist

Zvyagin Anatolii Illarionovich
- Звягин Анатолий Илларионович
- Born: 14 November 1937; Panyutino, Kharkiv Region
- Died: 4 May 1991 (aged 53); Kharkiv
- Citizenship: USSR
- Education: Kharkov State University
- Known for: Authoring pioneer studies of dynamical, magnetic, and thermal properties of low-symmetric and low-dimensional magnetic insulators
- Awards: State Prize of Ukraine in Science and Technology
- Scientific career
- Fields: Physicist
- Institutions: Verkin Institute for Low Temperature Physics and Engineering

Zvyagin Anatolii Illarionovich (born 14 November 1937 Panyutino, Kharkiv Region – died 4 May 1991 Kharkiv) is the author of pioneer studies of dynamical (in the wide range of frequencies, including rf, IR, and optical ones), magnetic, and thermal properties of low-symmetric and low-dimensional magnetic insulators.

He was physicist-researcher, Doctor of Sciences (Physics and Mathematics), professor, Corresponding Member of the Academy of Sciences of the Ukrainian SSR, the State Prize of the Ukrainian SSR in Science and Technology, director of the Institute for Low Temperature Physics and Engineering (1988–1991).

== Education and training ==
Anatolii Illarionovich Zvyagin studied at the Radiophysics Department of the Kharkov State University (Diploma in 1959). After the studies at the university he worked as an engineer at one of the enterprises of the cosmic branch; he took part in the preparation to flights of the first spaceships. In 1961 he had started post-graduate studies at the Institute for Low Temperature Physics and Engineering of the Academy of Sciences of the Ukrainian SSR. Five years later, he obtained the Candidate of Science (PhD) degree; thesis "Features of the infrared spectra of antiferromagnetic Co compounds" (scientific advisers: B.I. Verkin, the founder and the first director of the ILTPE, and V.V. Eremenko). From 1966 on, A.I. Zvyagin was the head of the department of the radio-spectroscopy of semiconductors and insulators (later the department of infrared and radio-spectroscopy of magnetic insulators).

In 1974 he has obtained the Doctor of Science (Physics and Mathematics) degree, thesis "Features of the energy spectrum and phase transitions in magnets with the low symmetry of crystal lattice". Since 1976 he was the Deputy Head in Research of the ILTPE. In 1978 he became the professor of physics. In 1985 he has been elected as the Corresponding Member of the Academy of Sciences of the Ukrainian SSR (Experimental Solid State Physics). In 1991 he has obtained the State Prize of Ukraine in Science and Technology (for the detection and investigations of the new type of resonances, structures and magneto-elastic anomalies in low-dimensional antiferromagnets). A.I. Zvyagin is the author and co-author of more than 150 scientific publications. He was the supervisor of 15 Candidate of Science (PhD) theses. Five of his former students became Doctors of Sciences. He was the member of the Editorial Board of the scientific journal "Fizika Nizkikh Temperatur" (published by the AIP as "Low Temperature Physics"). He conducted pedagogical activity, teaching many courses of lectures at the Kharkov State University and Kharkiv Polytechnic Institute. From 1988 till 4 May 1991 (died from the heart attack) he was the director of the Institute for Low Temperature Physics and Engineering of the Academy of Sciences of Ukrainian SSR.

== Scientific Activity ==
The scientific activity of A.I. Zvyagin was devoted to experimental studies of low-symmetric and low-dimensional magnetic insulators at low temperatures. Among the main achievements of A.I. Zvyagin and his co-workers one can mention the discovery of the new phases and Phase Transformations in systems of rare-earth tungstates and molybdates. His works, devoted to the investigations of the low-frequency branches of spectra of highly anisotropic magnets and layered ferroelectric elastics, are widely known. Principally important results were obtained by A.I. Zvyagin when studying low temperature structural and magnetic phase transitions in crystals with the strong spin-phonon interaction. In the framework of the pioneer studies of the dynamical resonance properties of low dimensional (one- and two-dimensional) magnets principally new exchange modes of oscillations of such magnetic systems were discovered experimentally. Also, important results were obtained by A.I. Zvyagin and co-workers in studies of magnetic properties of undoped cuprates, which manifest the high-temperature superconductivity at the optimal doping.

== Selected publications ==
1. A.G. Anders, A.I. Zvyagin, M.I. Kobets, L.N. Pelikh, E.N. Khats' ko, V.G. Yurko. Effect of Short Range Order on the Magnetic Properties of Copper Tungstates. Soviet physics JETP V. 35, N 5, 934–936 (1972)
2. A.I. Zvyagin, T.S. Stetsenko, V.G. Yurko, R.A. Vaishnoras. Low-temperature phase transition in KDy(MoO_{4})_{2} caused by the co-operative Jahn-Teller effect, Pis'ma Zh.Eksp. Teor. Fiz. V.17, N 5 189–193 (1973) [JETP Lett. V. 17, 135 (1973)].
3. T.S. Stetsenko, A.M. Pshisuha, S.D. Elchaninova, and A.I. Zvyagin, Energy spectrum of Dy3+ ion in single crystals of the system KY(MoO_{4})_{2}*KDy(MoO_{4})_{2}, Optics and Spectroscopy V. 34 N 1, 227 (1973).
4. S.D. Elchaninova, A.I. Zvyagin, T.S. Stretsenko, L.N. Pelikh, and E.N. Khatsko, Low-temperature structure phase transition in CsDy(MoO_{4})_{2}, Fizika Nizkikh Temperatur V. 1, N 1, 79–82 (1975) [Sov. J. Low Temp. Phys. V. 1, 39 (1975)].
5. A.M. Pshisukha, A.S. Chernyi, A.I. Zvyagin, Effect of the low symmetry in the EPR spectrum of Er3+ ion in KY(MoO_{4})_{2}, Fizika Nizkikh Temperatur V. 1, N 4 473–477 (1975) [Sov. J. Low Temp. Phys. V. 1, 233 (1975)];
6. A.M. Pshisukha, A.I. Zvyagin, and A.S. Chernyi, Особенности спектров ЭПР кристаллов KY(MoO_{4})_{2} — KEr(MoO_{4})_{2}, обусловленные низкой симметрией структуры, Fizika Nizkikh Temperatur V. 2, N 3 339–346 (1976) [Sov. J. Low Temp. Phys. V. 2, 18 (1976)].
7. A.I. Otko, N.M. Nesterenko, A.I. Zvyagin, Segnetoelastic phase transformations in double trigonal molybdates and tungstates, Izv. Akad. Nauk SSSR (physics series) V. 43 N 8, 1675–1684, (1979).
8. S.D. El'chaninova, A.G. Anders, A.I. Zvyagin, M.I. Kobets, Yu.G. Litvinenko, Change in local environment of Dy3+ ions at the structural phase transition in CsDy(MoO_{4})_{2}, Fizika Nizkikh Temperatur V. 7 N 2, 187–191, (1981).
9. S.D. Elchaninova and A.I. Zvyagin, Phase transition in CsDy(MoO4)2 and the electron spectrum of Dy3+ ion, Fizika Nizkikh Temperatur V. 9 N 11, 1200–1205, (1983).
10. M.B. Zapart, W. Zapart, A.I. Zvyagin, Phase transitions in ferroelastic RbIn(MoO4)2 crystals by electron paramanetic resonance of Cr3+ ions, Physica Status Solidi A V. 82 N 1, 67–73 (1984).
11. I.M. Vitebskii, S.V. Zherlitsyn, A.I. Zvyagin, A.A. Stepanov, V.D. Fil’, Elastic characteristics of KDy(MoO_{4})_{2} in the region of structural transition, Fizika Nizkikh Temperatur V. 12, 1108–1111, (1986) [Sov. J. Low Temp. Phys. V. 12, 626 (1986)].
12. A.I. Zvyagin and V.I.Kutko, Oscillation spectrum and structure phase transition in Cs-Bi molybdate, Fizika Nizkikh Temperatur V. 13 N 5, 537–540, (1987).
13. V.A. Bagulya, A.I.Zvyagin, V.I. Kutko A.A. Milner and I.V. Skoroibogatova, Investigations of the Zeeman effect of the low-energy states of KDy(MoO_{4})_{2} at the low-temperature phase transition, Fizika Nizkikh Temperatur V. 14 N 11, 1215–1218, (1988).
14. P. Stefányi, A. Feher, A. Orendáčová, E.E. Anders, A.I. Zvyagin, Magnetic phase transition in layered CsGd (MoO4)2, Journal of magnetism and magnetic materials V. 73 N 1, 129–130, (1988)
15. V. I. Kut’ko, I. V. Skorobogatova, V. A. Bagulya, Yu. N. Kharchenko, and A. I. Zvyagin, Spectroscopic studies of low-energy states of the system KDy(MoO_{4})_{2}-KY(MoO_{4})_{2}, Fizika Nizkikh Temperatur V. 17, N 8, 1023–1030 (1991) [Sov. J. Low Temp. Phys. V. 17, 533 (1991)].
16. A.G. Anders, A.I. Zvyagin, Yu.V. Pereverzev, A.I. Petutin, A.A. Stepanov, AFMR and subthreshold two-magnon absorption in quasi-one-dimensional antiferromagnet CsMnCl_{3}, 2H_{2}O, Journal de Physique Colloques V. 39 (C6), C6-739-C6-740, (1978).
17. M.I. Kobets, A.A. Stepanov, A.I. Zvyagin, Resonance properties of NH_{3}-(CH_{2})2-NH_{3} MnCl_{4}, an ideal two-dimensional antiferromagnet with the Dzyaloshinsky interaction, Physica B+C 108 (1–3), 843–844, (1981)
18. A.I. Zvyagin, M.I. Kobets, V.N. Krivoruchko, A.A. Stepanov, D.A. Yablonskii, Magnetic resonance and phase transitions in the two-dimensional antiferromagnet (NH_{3})_{2}(CH_{2})_{3}MnCl_{4}, Zhurnal Eksp. Teor. Fiz. V. 89, 2298–2317, (1985) [Sov. Phys. JETP V. 62, N 6, 1328 (1985)].
19. V.G. Baryakhtar, A.I. Zvyagin, M.I. Kobetz, V.N. Krivoruchko, A.A Stepanov, D.A Yablonsky, Quasi-2-dimensional 4-sublattice antiferromagnet with essentially noncollinear structure (NH_{3})_{2}(CH_{2})_{3}MnCl_{4}, Fizika Nizkikh Temperatur V. 11, N 10, 1113–1115, (1985)
20. A.I. Zvyagin, V.N. Krivoruchko, V.A. Pashchenko, A.A. Stepanov, and D.A. Yabloskii, Orientational phase transition in a two-dimensional four-sublattice antiferromagnet (NH_{3})_{2}(CH_{2})_{3}MnCl_{4} subjected to an inclined magnetic field, Zhurnal Eksp. Teor. Fiz. V. 92 311–318 (1987)
21. V.A. Bagulya, A.I. Zvyagin, M.I. Kobets, A.A. Stepanov, A.S. Zaika, Study of the low-temperature phase transition KDy(MoO_{4})_{2} by the EPR method in the submillimiter and millimiter range of wavelengths, Fizika Nizkikh Temperatur V. 14, N 5, 493–498 (1988) [Sov. J. Low Temp. Phys. V. 14, 270 (1988)].
22. N. Chattopadhyay, P.J. Brown, A.A. Stepanov, P. Wyder, J. Voiron, A.I. Zvyagin, S.N. Barilo, D.I. Zhigunov, and I. Zobkalo, Magnetic phase transitions in Gd_{2}CuO_{4}, Physical Review B V. 44, 9486 (1991).
