= Igor Chueshov =

Ukrainian mathematician (1951-2016)

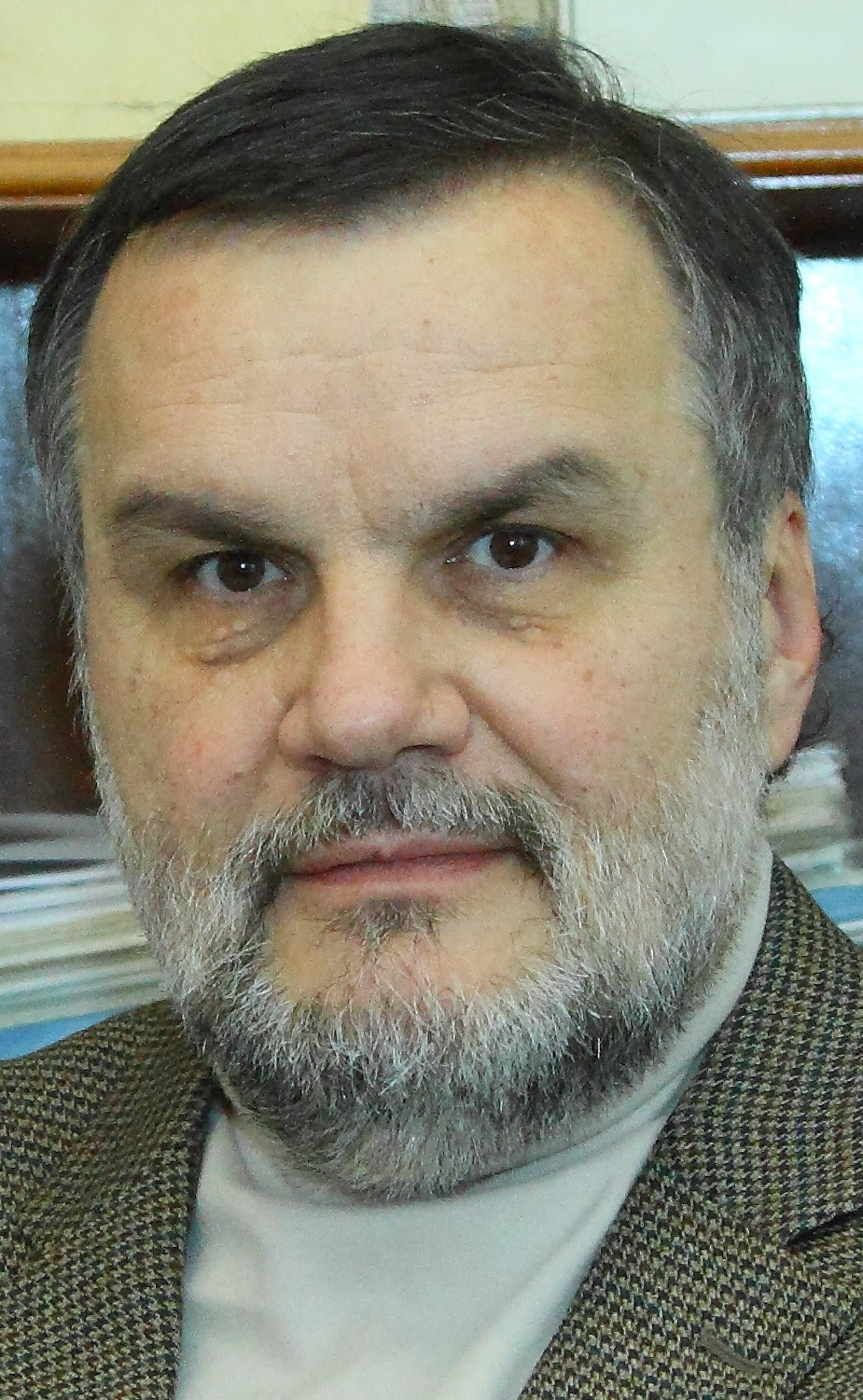
- Born: 23 September 1951; Leningrad
- Died: 23 April 2016 (aged 64); Kharkiv, Ukraine
- Other name: Ігор Дмитрович Чуєшов
- Education: Kharkiv University (MS, 1973)
- Known for: Quasi-stability theory; Evolutionary von Karman equations; Infinite-dimensional dynamical systems; Monotonous stochastic dynamic systems; Correspondent Member of the National Academy of Sciences of Ukraine
- Awards: Laureate of the State Prize of Ukraine in the field of science and technology (2010)
- Scientific career
- Fields: Mathematics and physics
- Workplaces: VN Karazin Kharkiv National University
- Thesis: (1977)

Igor Dmitrievich Chueshov (23 September 1951 – 23 April 2016) was a Ukrainian mathematician. He was both a correspondent member of the Mathematics section (specializing in probability theory and mathematical physics) of the National Academy of Sciences of Ukraine and a professor in the Department of Mathematical Physics and Computational Mathematics at the National University of Kharkiv.

== Biography ==
Chueshov was born in Leningrad on 23 September 1951. He started his higher education at the School of Mechanics and Mathematics at the National University of Kharkov in 1968. He graduated with a Master of Science degree in Mathematics in 1973. In 1977, he earned a Candidate of Sciences, an equivalent to a Ph.D. Chueshov earned a Doctorate of Physical and Mathematical Sciences in 1990 with his dissertation, "Mathematical Description of the Non-regular Dynamics of the Elastic Shell". Upon graduation, he joined Kharkiv University's department of Mechanics and Mathematics.

Chueshov became Professor of the Department of Mathematical Physics and Computational Mathematics in 1992. In February 2000, he was named the head of the department. In February 2009, Chueshov was elected as one of the Correspondent Members of the National Academy of Sciences of Ukraine for the Section of Mathematics, specializing in Probability Theory and Mathematical Physics. He was also a laureate of the State Prize of Ukraine in the field of science and technology, which he received in 2010. He remained at the Mechanics and Mathematics department of Kharkiv University, living with his wife Galina and two sons, Constantin (born in 1979, Kharkiv) and Gennadiy (born in 1983, Kharkiv), both now live in California, until his death on 23 April 2016 from acute leukemia.

== Research ==
Chueshov authored a number of papers in the field of fundamental mathematics. He made significant contributions to mathematical physics and influenced the development of modern infinite-dimensional dynamical systems theory. He solved a number of important problems associated with non-linear partial differential equations that arise in mechanics and physics, initiating the development of several areas in the qualitative theory of dissipative systems. Chueshov's investigations were related to the well-posedness and asymptotic behavior of the evolutionary von Karman equations, describing nonlinear oscillations of a thin elastic shell under the influence of non-conservative loads. One of Chueshov's theorems provided a solution to a well-known problem posed by I.V. Vorovich in the 1950s. The results became an essential step in understanding the structure of attractors for dynamical systems. Chueshov was also a pioneer in the field of nonlinear fluid-structure interactions models, especially those arising in aeroelasticity (for instance, the nonlinear model of a fluttering [link here] panel studied by Earl Dowell).

Chueshov succeeded in developing a new effective method for the analysis of general infinite-dimensional dissipative systems generated by non-linear second-order in time equations. Quasi-stability allows one to resolve many important questions that arise in the hyperbolic dynamics with nonlinear internal or boundary dissipation, relying only on a single estimate. Chueshov also obtained important results on the uniqueness of invariant measures for stochastic perturbations of the three-dimensional Navier-Stokes equations in thin regions. The results provided a fundamental opportunity to use methods of two-dimensional stochastic hydrodynamics to describe the phenomenon of turbulence in some three-dimensional systems.

Igor Dmitrievich was one of the founders of the theory of monotone stochastic dynamical systems. Together with Professor L. Arnold, he obtained fundamental results on the structure of random attractors, and introduced the important concept of the semi-equilibrium state of a monotone stochastic system. These results became the basis of the only monograph on monotonous stochastic dynamic systems, published by Springer in 2002.

Chueshov authored more than 150 scientific works, which included six monographs,

and was a member of the editorial board of the journals Journal of Mathematical Physics, Analysis, Geometry, Ukrainian Mathematical Journal, Stochastics and Dynamics, International Journal of Differential Equations, and Visnyk of V.N.Karazin Kharkiv National University. Ser. Mathematics, Applied Mathematics and Mechanics. He was also a member of several international mathematical societies as well as a guest professor at various universities. Under his supervision, seven candidates' theses (Ph.D.s) were defended (A.Rezounenko, A.Rekalo, O.Shcherbina, T.Fastovskaya, I.Ryzhkova, O.Naboka, and M.Potemkin).
