= Akhiezer's theorem =

In the mathematical field of complex analysis, Akhiezer's theorem is a result about entire functions proved by Naum Akhiezer.

== Statement ==
Let $f:\mathbb{C}\to\mathbb{C}$ be an entire function of exponential type $\tau$, with $f(x)\geq 0$ for real $x$. Then the following are equivalent:

- There exists an entire function $F$, of exponential type $\tau/2$, having all its zeros in the (closed) upper half plane, such that

$$f(z)=F(z)\overline{F(\overline{z})}$$

- One has:

$$\sum_n |\operatorname{Im}(1/z_{n})|<\infty$$

where $z_n$ are the zeros of $f$.

== Related results ==
It is not hard to show that the Fejér–Riesz theorem is a special case.
