= Konstantin Andreev =

Russian mathematician (1848–1921)

Konstantin Alekseevich Andreev
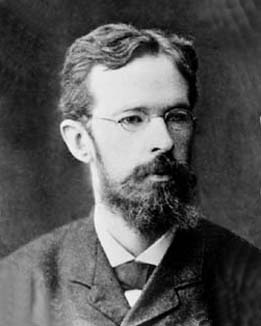
- Born: 14 March 1848; Moscow, Russia
- Died: 29 October 1921 (aged 73); Sevastopol, Ukraine
- Education: Imperial Moscow University (1871)
- Known for: Andréief identity
- Scientific career
- Fields: Geometry
- Thesis: The construction of plane curves over a sufficient number of points by the method of many-valued correspondences

Konstantin Alekseevich Andreev (14 March 1848 – 29 October 1921) was a Russian mathematician, best known for his work on geometry, especially projective geometry. He was one of the founders of the Kharkov Mathematical Society. This society is one of the early mathematics societies in Russia and was founded in 1879.

Andreev was born in Moscow in a merchant family specialized in fur trading. When he was young, their business went into decline, and the family had to endure severe hardship. During that time, he also lost one eye in an accident that had delayed his studies – he entered gymnasium only in 1860, at the age of 12. However, he rapidly progressed, especially in mathematics, and by the age of 14 started giving private lessons to earn money for his subsistence. In 1867, Andreev enrolled to the Mathematics Department of the Moscow University. As the fourth year he wrote an essay "On the tables of mortality" which was awarded gold medal by the faculty and published in the Scientific Memoirs of the Moscow University, thereby becoming his first scientific work. Andreev graduated in 1871 but remained at the faculty and within two years obtained a Master Diploma.

Around that time, by recommendation of one of his teachers, Andreev was invited for PhD studies to the University of Kharkov. He accepted and from January 1874 began teaching university courses there. In February 1875, he defended his PhD "On a geometric formation of planar curves" and was promoted to a full-time lecturer. At the end of 1876, Andreev was sent for practice to Europe for one and half years. He spent that time mostly in Berlin and Paris, where he prepared his habilitation work "On the geometric correspondences, as applied to the problem of constructing curves". He defended that work in Moscow in February 1879 and was soon appointed as full professor of the Kharkov University, as well as of Kharkov Technology Institute.

In 1884, he was elected as a correspondent member of the Russian Academy of Sciences and in the summer of that year reported his work "On Poncelet polygons" at a conference in La Rochelle, France. In 1898 Andreev returned to Moscow, to assume a post of professor at the Department of Mathematics of Moscow University. Simultaneously, he became director of Alexander School of Business (at Basman), which post he held until 1907, and spent much time working for secondary education system. At Moscow University, Andreev became the first dean elect of the Physics and Mathematics Faculty (from 1905 to 1911), where he introduced the standard lecture cycle system. In 1911, he had to resign as a dean and stop lecturing due to a throat tumor, which he had operated in 1913 in Europe. He then resumed teaching at Moscow University until 1917, when other health problems urged him to abandon most activities and moved to the health resorts of Crimea. He died near Sevastopol in October 1921.
