= Yurii G. Naidyuk =

Ukrainian physicist

Yurii Georgiyovych Naidyuk
- Юрій Георгійович Найдюк
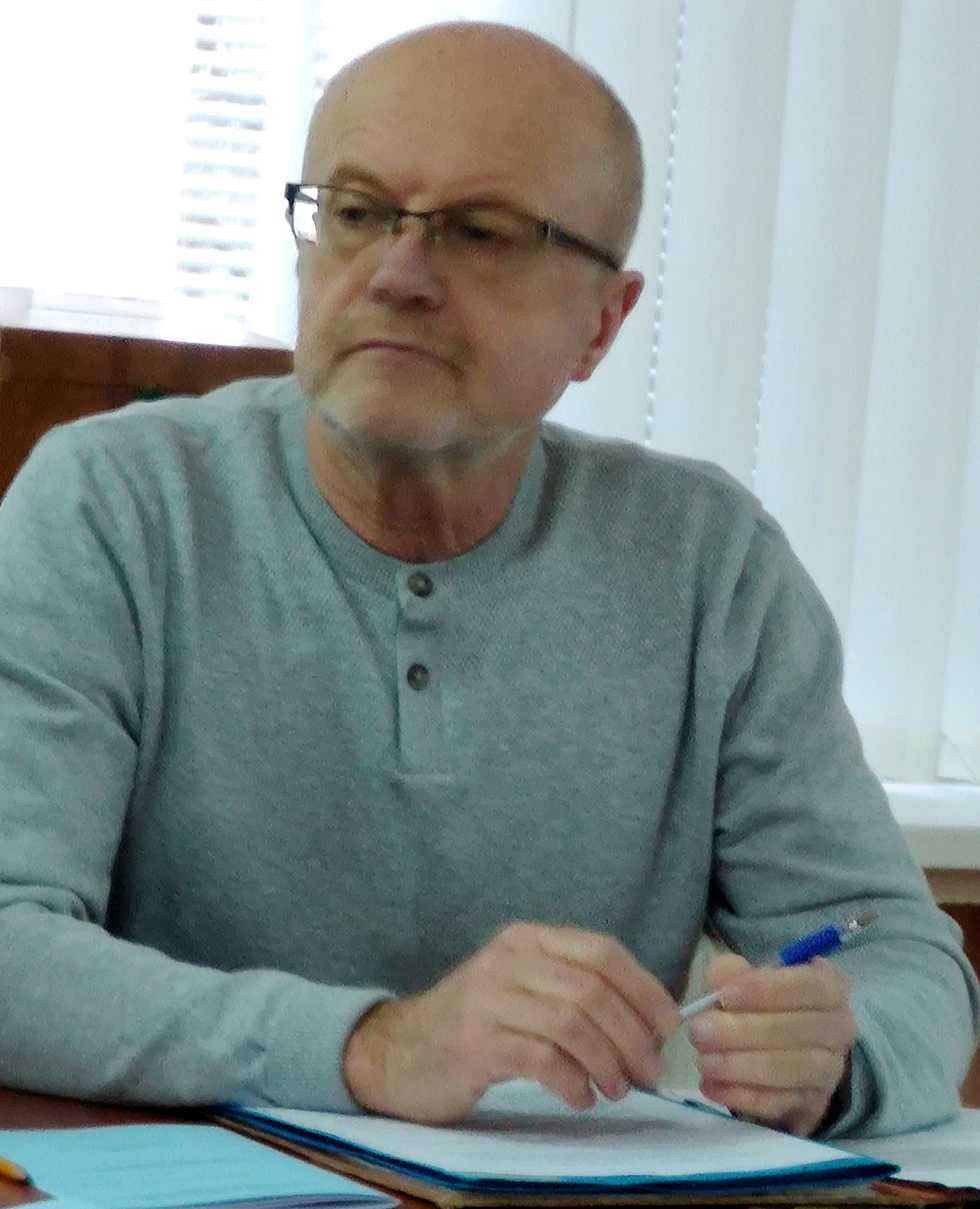
- Born: 23 July 1955 (age 71); Bogdanivka, Rivne Region
- Citizenship: Ukraine
- Education: V.N. Karazin Kharkiv National University
- Known for: Point-contact spectroscopy
- Awards: State Prize of Ukraine in Science and Technology
- Scientific career
- Fields: Physicist
- Institutions: Verkin Institute for Low Temperature Physics and Engineering

Yurii Georgiyovych Naidyuk (Ukrainian: Юрій Георгійович Найдюк; born 23 July 1955) is a Ukrainian physicist, 2021-2024 Director of the B.I. Verkin Institute for Low Temperature Physics and Engineering of the National Academy of Sciences of Ukraine. He is a corresponding member of the National Academy of Sciences of Ukraine (NASU). He has been awarded the State Prize of Ukraine in Science and Technology and the B. I. Verkin Prize of the National Academy of Sciences of Ukraine. He is the editor-in-chief of the academic journal Low Temperature Physics.

== Biography ==
Yurii G. Naidyuk was born on 23 July 1955, in the village of Bogdanivka in the Rivne Region, USSR, Ukrainian SSR. He graduated summa cum laude from high school in 1971. In 1976 he graduated summa cum laude from the Faculty of Physics at Kharkiv State University. Since graduation, he has worked at the B.I. Verkin Institute for Low Temperature Physics and Engineering of the National Academy of Sciences of Ukraine (ILTPE), Kharkiv, Ukraine. In 1982, he defended his dissertation for the Candidate's Degree (Ph.D. equivalent) in Physical and Mathematical Sciences on "Investigation of the mechanisms of scattering of conduction electrons in metal point contacts" (Research supervisor I.K. Yanson). He became a senior research fellow in 2000. In 2001, he defended his second dissertation for the Doctor's Degree in Physical and Mathematical Sciences with a thesis titled: "Point contact spectroscopy of highly correlated electronic systems". He has been a professor since 2011. From 2003 to 2011 Naidyuk was a lead researcher at the B.I. Verkin ILTPE. In 2011, he became Chair of the Department of Point Contact Spectroscopy at the B.I. Verkin ILTPE. In 2021-2024, he worked as a director, then as a chief researcher of the B.I. Verkin ILTPE. Naidyuk interned and worked at various international research centers.

== Scientific research activity ==
The main field of Naidyuk's scientific research is the study of the interaction of conduction electrons with quasiparticle excitations in solids using the method of point contact spectroscopy; research of strongly correlated electronic systems and point contact spectroscopy of topical superconductors, including promising ones such as magnesium diboride, rare-earth nickel-borocarbide compounds, newest iron-based superconductors, and topological semimetals. Naidyuk has been researching electronic transport in point contacts at ultrahigh current densities and strong electric fields at low temperatures, charge and spin transfer processes in nanoscale structures based on magnetically ordered compounds and materials.

Naidyuk is the author or co-author of over 120 scientific articles and three review publications indexed in SCOPUS and Web of Science databases. With I. K. Yanson he co-authored the monograph "Point-contact spectroscopy" in 2005.

Naidyuk is actively collaborating with European, American, and Chinese scientists and is regularly invited to conduct collaborative scientific research. For over five years, he worked in research centers such as The Grenoble High Magnetic Field Laboratory (France), Karlsruhe University (Germany), KTH Royal Institute of Technology in Stockholm (Sweden), The Institute of Experimental Physics of the Slovak Academy of Sciences in Košice (Slovakia), The University of Turku (Finland), Texas A&M University, College Station, TX (USA), The Leibniz Institute for Solid State and Materials Research Dresden (Germany).

The most notable results of Naidyuk's scientific research activity:

- Development and implementation of the point-contact spectroscopy method for the study of the interaction of conduction electrons with quasiparticle excitations, including phonons, local and quasilocal vibrations, magnetic impurities (Kondo effect).
- Thermal effects in point contacts have been studied, and modulation point contact spectroscopy has been developed. The effects caused by ultra-high current density in point contacts were detected, among them the thermoelectric Seebeck and Peltier effects. The possibility of phase transition detection under the influence of high electric current was shown.
- Crystal-electric-field effects have been revealed in intermetallic compounds with rare-earth ions, in which the Zeeman splitting and paramagnon excitations were detected for the first time using point contact spectroscopy.
- The temperature and magnetic field dependence of the order parameter in simple Zn, Sn, In, and Nb superconductors have been investigated based on the Andreev reflection spectroscopy, which has provided experimental substantiation of the existing theory.
- A method of point contact spectroscopy for a family of heavy fermion compounds in the normal and superconducting states has been developed. The peculiarities of the surface superconducting state and the quantization of conductivity in these compounds were revealed.
- Two-gap superconducting states of magnesium diboride MgB_{2} have been detected by using the Andreev reflection method. The anisotropy of the electron-phonon interaction in this compound was established.
- The two-gap nature of superconductivity in rare-earth nickel-borocarbide compounds has been experimentally confirmed on the basis of the analysis of the peculiarities of their Andreev reflection spectra. The spectra of electron-quasiparticle interaction were studied, the low-frequency quasiparticle mode was found, and the effects of the crystal-electric-field in these compounds were revealed.
- Investigation of spin-dependent effects in the conductivity of point contacts based on magnetically ordered materials and the discovery of the surface spin-valve effect implemented on an atomic scale.
- Implementation of a point-contact spin-diode based on a nanoscale double tunnel junction with a multilayer Fe/MgO structure, which is promising for the construction of various logic elements and memory.
- The pioneering research of the newest iron-based superconductors and topological semi-metals using the method of point contact spectroscopy has been carried out. The existence of the surface superconducting state in point contacts based on layered Weyl compounds MoTe_{2} and WTe_{2} has been revealed. The surface superconducting state in point contacts may have "topological" superconducting phases that are promising for use in the development of fault-tolerant quantum calculations.

== Scientific and organizational work ==
- Editor-in-Chief of the academic journal Low Temperatures Physics
- Chairman of the Scientific Council on Low Temperature Physics and Cryogenic Engineering at the Department of Physics and Astronomy of the National Academy of Sciences of Ukraine
- Member of the Scientific Council of the National Research Foundation of Ukraine (2019-2020)
- Member of the Bureau of the Department of Physics and Astronomy of the National Academy of Sciences of Ukraine

== Awards ==
- The State Prize of Ukraine in Science and Technology (2015)
- The Badge of the National Academy of Sciences of Ukraine "For Professional Achievements" (2010)
- The B.I. Verkin Prize of the National Academy of Sciences of Ukraine (2006)
- Humboldt Research Fellowship (1995-1996)

== Selected publications ==
=== Monograph ===
Yu. G. Naidyuk, I.K. Yanson, Point-contact spectroscopy, Springer, New-York, 2005.

=== Reviews ===
- Naidyuk, Yu G; Yanson, I K (12 October 1998). "Point-contact spectroscopy of heavy-fermion systems". Journal of Physics: Condensed Matter. 10 (40): 8905–8938. doi:10.1088/0953-8984/10/40/001. S2CID 250737460.
- Yanson, I. K.; Naidyuk, Yu. G. (April 2004). "Advances in point-contact spectroscopy: two-band superconductor MgB2 (Review)". Low Temperature Physics. 30 (4): 261–274. arXiv:cond-mat/0402095. Bibcode:2004LTP....30..261Y. doi:10.1063/1.1704612. S2CID 119338037.
- Naidyuk, Yu. G.; Gloos, K. (April 2018). "Anatomy of point-contact Andreev reflection spectroscopy from the experimental point of view". Low Temperature Physics. 44 (4): 257–268. arXiv:1712.06903. Bibcode:2018LTP....44..257N. doi:10.1063/1.5030447. S2CID 119387136.

=== Main scientific works ===
- Verkin, B.I.; Yanson, I.K.; Kulik, I.O.; Shklyarevski, O.I.; Lysykh, A.A.; Naydyuk, Yu.G. (April 1979). "Singularities in d2V/dI2 dependences of point contacts between ferromagnetic metals". Solid State Communications. 30 (4): 215–218. Bibcode:1979SSCom..30..215V. doi:10.1016/0038-1098(79)90337-5.
- Lysykh, A.A.; Yanson, I.K.; Shklyarevski, O.I.; Naydyuk, Yu.G. (September 1980). "Point-contact spectroscopy of electron-phonon interaction in alloys". Solid State Communications. 35 (12): 987–989. Bibcode:1980SSCom..35..987L. doi:10.1016/0038-1098(80)91002-9.
- Reiffers, M.; Naidyuk, Yu. G.; Jansen, A. G. M.; Wyder, P.; Yanson, I. K.; Gignoux, D.; Schmitt, D. P. (27 March 1989). "Direct measurement of the Zeeman splitting of crystal-field levels in PrNi 5 by point-contact spectroscopy". Physical Review Letters. 62 (13): 1560–1563. Bibcode:1989PhRvL..62.1560R. doi:10.1103/PhysRevLett.62.1560.
- Nowack, A.; Naidyuk, Yu. G.; Chubov, P. N.; Yanson, I. K.; Menovsky, A. (October 1992). "Point-contact study of the heavy-fermion system URu2Si2". Zeitschrift für Physik B: Condensed Matter. 88 (3): 295–301. Bibcode:1992ZPhyB..88..295N. doi:10.1007/BF01470916. S2CID 120057879.
- Naidyuk, Yu. G.; Yanson, I. K.; Tyutrina, L. V.; Bobrov, N. L.; Chubov, P. N.; Kang, W. N.; Kim, Hyeong-Jin; Choi, Eun-Mi; Lee, Sung-Ik (March 2002). "Superconducting energy gap distribution in c-axis oriented MgB2 thin film from point contact study". Journal of Experimental and Theoretical Physics Letters. 75 (5): 238–241. arXiv:cond-mat/0112452. Bibcode:2002JETPL..75..238N. doi:10.1134/1.1478521. S2CID 119338551.
- Yanson, I. K.; Naidyuk, Yu. G.; Bashlakov, D. L.; Fisun, V. V.; Balkashin, O. P.; Korenivski, V.; Konovalenko, A.; Shekhter, R. I. (25 October 2005). "Spectroscopy of Phonons and Spin Torques in Magnetic Point Contacts". Physical Review Letters. 95 (18) 186602. arXiv:cond-mat/0509396. Bibcode:2005PhRvL..95r6602Y. doi:10.1103/PhysRevLett.95.186602. PMID 16383931. S2CID 1194270.
- Yanson, I. K.; Naidyuk, Yu. G.; Fisun, V. V.; Konovalenko, A.; Balkashin, O. P.; Triputen, L. Yu.; Korenivski, V. (1 April 2007). "Surface Spin-Valve Effect". Nano Letters. 7 (4): 927–931. arXiv:cond-mat/0703341. Bibcode:2007NanoL...7..927Y. doi:10.1021/nl0628192. PMID 17335271. S2CID 45339518.
- Iovan, A.; Andersson, S.; Naidyuk, Yu. G.; Vedyaev, A.; Dieny, B.; Korenivski, V. (1 March 2008). "Spin Diode Based on Fe/MgO Double Tunnel Junction". Nano Letters. 8 (3): 805–809. arXiv:0705.2375. Bibcode:2008NanoL...8..805I. doi:10.1021/nl072676z. PMID 18284216. S2CID 14380644.
- Naidyuk, Yu G; Kvitnitskaya, O E; Yanson, I K; Fuchs, G; Haindl, S; Kidszun, M; Schultz, L; Holzapfel, B (1 June 2011). "Point-contact study of ReFeAsO 1 − x F x (Re = La, Sm) superconducting films". Superconductor Science and Technology. 24 (6) 065010. arXiv:1103.3157. Bibcode:2011SuScT..24f5010N. doi:10.1088/0953-2048/24/6/065010. S2CID 118487457.
- Naidyuk, Yu. G.; Fuchs, G.; Chareev, D. A.; Vasiliev, A. N. (28 April 2016). "Doubling of the critical temperature of FeSe observed in point contacts". Physical Review B. 93 (14) 144515. arXiv:1604.02921. Bibcode:2016PhRvB..93n4515N. doi:10.1103/PhysRevB.93.144515. S2CID 119127164.
- Naidyuk, Yurii; Kvitnitskaya, Oksana; Bashlakov, Dmytro; Aswartham, Saicharan; Morozov, Igor; Chernyavskii, Ivan; Fuchs, Günter; Drechsler, Stefan-Lüdwig; Hühne, Ruben; Nielsch, Kornelius; Büchner, Bernd; Efremov, Dmitriy (2 August 2018). "Surface superconductivity in the Weyl semimetal MoTe 2 detected by point contact spectroscopy". 2D Materials. 5 (4): 045014. arXiv:1805.02470. Bibcode:2018TDM.....5d5014N. doi:10.1088/2053-1583/aad3e2. S2CID 119197686.
