= Khinchin's theorem =

Khinchin's theorem may refer to any of several different results by Aleksandr Khinchin:

- Wiener–Khinchin theorem
- Khinchin's constant
- Khinchin's theorem on the factorization of distributions
- Khinchin's theorem on Diophantine approximations
