= Dmitrii Sintsov =

Russian mathematician

Dmitrii Matveyevich Sintsov (Russian: Дмитрий Матвеевич Синцов; 20 November 1867, Vyatka – 28 January 1946, Kharkiv) was a Russian mathematician known for his work in the theory of conic sections and non-holonomic geometry.

He took a leading role in the development of mathematics at the University of Kharkiv, serving as chairman of the Kharkiv Mathematical Society for forty years, from 1906 until his death at the age of 78.

== See also ==
- Aleksandr Lyapunov

== Bibliography ==
- Березюк, Н.М. (2017). "Видатний математик і невідомий бібліограф Дмитро Матвійович Синцов (1867–1946)". Бібліотечний форум: історія, теорія і практика (in Ukrainian). 2 (8): 49–53. ISSN 2518-7341.
- Волков, Сергей (2017). Высшее чиновничество Российской империи. Краткий словарь (in Russian). Русский фонд содействия образованию и науке. ISBN 9785040609390.
- Марасова, С.Е. (2014). "Д. М. Синцов и Харьковская математическая школа: анализ особенностей философско-метоологического сознания ученых". Філософія (in Russian). 27: 77–91. ISSN 2079-0783.
- Naumov, I.A. (1968). "Dmitrii Matveevich Sintsov on the 100th anniversary of his birth". Ukrainian Mathematical Journal. 20 (2): 208–212. doi:10.1007/BF01085536. ISSN 0041-5995. S2CID 121855627.
- Steffens, Karl-Georg (2006). The History of Approximation Theory: From Euler to Bernstein. Birkhäuser. ISBN 0-8176-4353-2.
