= Raikov's theorem =

Theorem in probability theory

Raikov’s theorem, named for Russian mathematician Dmitrii Abramovich Raikov, is a result in the probability theory. It is well known that if each of two independent random variables $\xi_1$ and $\xi_2$ has a Poisson distribution, then their sum $\xi = \xi_1 + \xi_2$ has a Poisson distribution as well. It turns out that the converse is also valid.

== Statement of the theorem ==
Suppose that a random variable $\xi$ has a Poisson distribution and admits a decomposition as a sum $\xi = \xi_1 + \xi_2$ of two independent random variables. Then the distribution of each summand is a shifted Poisson distribution.

Raikov's theorem is similar to Cramér’s decomposition theorem. The latter result claims that if a sum of two independent random variables has a normal distribution, then each summand is normally distributed as well. It was also proved by Yu. V. Linnik that a convolution of normal distribution and Poisson's distribution possesses a similar property (Linnik's theorem). It follows from the Raikov theorem that the Poisson distribution belongs to the Linnik class $I_0$.

== An extension to locally compact Abelian groups ==
Let $X$ be a locally compact Abelian group. Denote by $M^1(X)$ the convolution semigroup of probability distributions on $X$, and by $E_x$the degenerate distribution concentrated at $x\in X$. Let $x_0\in X, \lambda>0$.

The Poisson distribution generated by the measure $\lambda E_{x_0}$ is defined as a distribution of the form

$\mu=e(\lambda E_{x_0})=e^{-\lambda} \left( E_0+\lambda E_{x_0}+ \frac{\lambda^2 E_{2x_0}}{2!} + \cdots+ \frac{\lambda^n E_{nx_0}}{n!}+\cdots \right).$

Theorem Let $\mu$ be the Poisson distribution generated by the measure $\lambda E_{x_0}$. Suppose that $\mu=\mu_1*\mu_2$, with $\mu_j\in M^1(X)$. Then each of $\mu_j$ is a shift of a Poisson distribution if and only if $x_0$ is either an infinite-order element or has order 2.
