= Kac–Bernstein theorem =

Theorem in mathematical statistics

The Kac–Bernstein theorem is one of the earliest and most well-known characterization theorems in mathematical statistics. It states that the independence of the sum and difference of two independent random variables characterizes the normal distribution (Gaussian distribution). The theorem was proved independently by the Polish-American mathematician Mark Kac and the Soviet mathematician Sergei Bernstein.

== Statement of the theorem ==
Let $\xi$ and $\eta$ be independent random variables. If $\xi+\eta$ and $\xi-\eta$ are independent, then $\xi$ and $\eta$ are normally distributed (Gaussian).

A generalization of the Kac–Bernstein theorem is the Darmois–Skitovich theorem, in which the normal distribution is characterized by the independence of two linear forms of $n$ independent random variables.

== Generalizations to locally compact Abelian groups ==
The first works devoted to generalizing the Kac–Bernstein theorem to locally compact Abelian groups are due to A. L. Rukhin and also to H. Heyer and Ch. Rall. These works studied the following problem. Let $X$ be a locally compact Abelian group, and let $\xi$ and $\eta$ be independent random variables taking values in $X$ with distributions $\mu$ and $\nu$. For which groups $X$ does the independence of $\xi+\eta$ and $\xi-\eta$ imply that $\mu$ and $\nu$ are convolutions of Gaussian and idempotent distributions? Some sufficient conditions were established in and. The final result was obtained by G. M. Feldman, who proved the following theorem.

Theorem; see also. Let $X$ be a second countable locally compact Abelian group. Let $\xi$ and $\eta$ be independent random variables taking values in $X$ with distributions $\mu$ and $\nu$. Then the independence of $\xi+\eta$ and $\xi-\eta$ implies that $\mu$ and $\nu$ are convolutions of Gaussian and idempotent distributions if and only if the connected component of the zero of the group $X$ contains no elements of order 2.
