= Khinchin's theorem on the factorization of distributions =

Khinchin's theorem on the factorization of distributions says that every probability distribution P admits (in the convolution semi-group of probability distributions) a factorization

$$P = P_1 \otimes P_2$$

where P_{1} is a probability distribution without any indecomposable factor and P_{2} is a distribution that is either degenerate or is representable as the convolution of a finite or countable set of indecomposable distributions. The factorization is not unique, in general.

The theorem was proved by A. Ya. Khinchin for distributions on the line, and later it became clear that it is valid for distributions on considerably more general groups. A broad class (see) of topological semi-groups is known, including the convolution semi-group of distributions on the line, in which factorization theorems analogous to Khinchin's theorem are valid.
