= Boris Levitan =

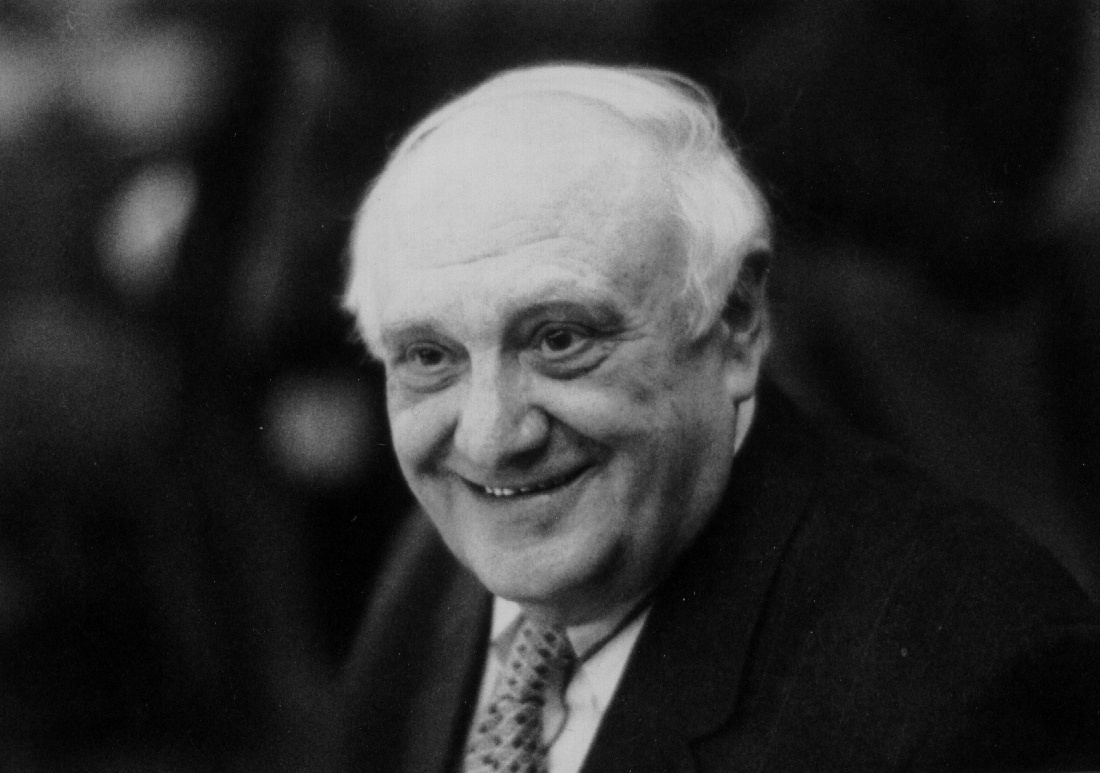
- 1996
- Born: 7 June 1914; Berdyansk, Russian Empire (present-day Russia)
- Died: 4 April 2004 (aged 89); Minneapolis, United States
- Education: Kharkov State University
- Awards: Order of Lenin
- Scientific career
- Fields: Mathematics
- Doctoral advisor: Naum Akhiezer
- Doctoral students: Grigory Isaakovich Barenblatt, Gusein Sh. Guseinov

Boris Levitan (7 June 1914 – 4 April 2004) was a mathematician who worked on almost periodic functions, Sturm–Liouville operators and inverse scattering.

Levitan was born in Berdyansk (southeastern Ukraine), and grew up in Kharkiv. He graduated from Kharkov University in 1936. In 1938, he submitted his PhD thesis "Some Generalization of Almost Periodic Function" under the supervision of Naum Akhiezer. He then defended the habilitation thesis "Theory of Generalized Translation Operators".

Levitan was drafted into the army at the beginning of World War II in 1941, and served until 1944. From 1944 to 1961, he worked at the Dzerzhinsky Military Academy, and from 1961 until about 1992 at Moscow University. In 1992, he emigrated to the United States. During the last years of his life, he worked for the University of Minnesota.
