= Mariya Shcherbina =

Ukrainian mathematician

Mariya Vladimirovna Shcherbyna (Ukrainian: Марія Володимирівна Щербина, born December 11, 1958) is a Ukrainian mathematician and mathematical physicist who studies the theory of random matrices. She is a corresponding member of the National Academy of Sciences of Ukraine, and the 2009 winner of the Mikhail Vasilyevich Ostrogradsky Prize.

Shcherbina earned a diploma from the National University of Kharkiv in 1981, and then did graduate studies at the Verkin Institute for Low Temperature Physics and Engineering, earning a candidacy in 1986. She completed her habilitation at the institute in 1997. She has been employed as a researcher at the Verkin Institute since 1983, and is a division head there.

With Leonid Pastur, Shcherbina is the author of Eigenvalue Distribution of Large Random Matrices (Mathematical Surveys and Monographs, American Mathematical Society, 2011). She was an invited speaker on mathematical physics at the 2018 International Congress of Mathematicians.
