= Low Temperature Physics (journal) =

- Discipline: Low temperature physics
- Language: English
- Edited by: Yurii G. Naidyuk

Publication details
- History: 1997-present
- Publisher: American Institute of Physics (United States)
- Frequency: Monthly
- Impact factor: 0.9 (2025)

Standard abbreviations
- ISO 4: Low Temp. Phys.

Indexing
- CODEN: LTPHEG
- ISSN: 1063-777X (print); 1529-7845 (web)
- LCCN: 93643860
- OCLC no.: 37356102

Links
- Journal homepage; Online archive

Low Temperature Physics is a monthly peer-reviewed scientific journal covering all aspects of low temperature physics. The journal publishes original articles, review articles, brief communications, memoirs, and biographies. The editor-in-chief is Yurii G. Naidyuk. This is a translation of the journal Fizika Nizkikh Temperatur (in Russian), published by the B.Verkin Institute for Low Temperature Physics and Engineering of the National Academy of Sciences of Ukraine.

== Abstracting and indexing ==
The journal is abstracted and indexed in Current Contents/Physical, Chemical & Earth Sciences, Inspec, PASCAL, Physics Abstracts, Science Citation Index, and SPIN bibliographic database.
