= Stochastics and Dynamics =

- Discipline: Mathematics
- Language: English
- Edited by: Björn Schmalfuß

Publication details
- History: 2001-present
- Publisher: World Scientific (Singapore)

Standard abbreviations
- ISO 4: Stoch. Dyn.

Indexing
- ISSN: 0219-4937 (print); 1793-6799 (web)

Links
- Journal homepage

Stochastics and Dynamics (SD) is an interdisciplinary journal published by World Scientific. It was founded in 2001 and covers "modeling, analyzing, quantifying and predicting stochastic phenomena in science and engineering from a dynamical system's point of view". Articles and papers in the journal describe theory, experiments, algorithms, numerical simulation and applications of stochastic phenomena, with a particular focus on random or stochastic ordinary, partial or functional differential equations and random mappings.

== Abstracting and indexing ==
The journal is abstracted and indexed in:

- Current Mathematical Publications
- Mathematical Reviews
- Science Citation Index-Expanded (SCIE), including the Web of Science
- CompuMath Citation Index(CMCI)
- ISI Alerting Services
- Current Contents/Physical, Chemical & Earth Sciences (CC/PC&ES)
- Zentralblatt MATH
