= Naum Akhiezer =

Soviet mathematician

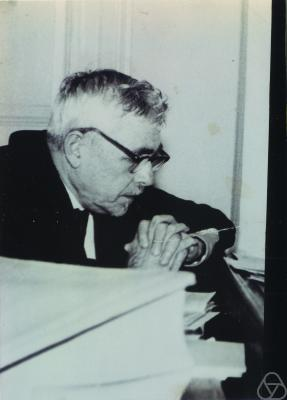
- Naum Ilyich Akhiezer
- Born: 6 March 1901; Cherikov, Russian Empire (present-day Belarus)
- Died: 3 June 1980 (aged 79); Kharkiv, USSR
- Education: Kyiv Institute of Public Education
- Known for: Akhiezer's theorem Achieser–Zolotarev filter Akhiezer–Krein–Favard theorem Baker–Akhiezer function
- Scientific career
- Fields: Mathematics
- Institutions: Kharkov State University, Kharkiv Polytechnic Institute, Kharkiv Aviation Institute
- Doctoral advisor: Dmitry Grave
- Doctoral students: Boris Levitan

Naum Ilyich Akhiezer (Ukrainian: Нау́м Іллі́ч Ахіє́зер, Russian: Нау́м Ильи́ч Ахие́зер; 6 March 1901 – 3 June 1980) was a Soviet and Ukrainian mathematician known for his works in approximation theory and the theory of differential and integral operators. He is also known as the author of classical books on various subjects in analysis, and for his work on the history of mathematics. He is the brother of the theoretical physicist Aleksandr Akhiezer.

== Biography ==
Naum Il'ich Akhiezer was born on 6 March 1901 in the town of Cherikov, Mogilev Governorate, in the Russian Empire, into the family of a zemstvo physician. His younger brother, Alexander Ilyich Akhiezer, later became a well-known theoretical physicist and an academician of the National Academy of Sciences of Ukraine. In 1918, Akhiezer graduated from a classical gymnasium in Mstislavl and entered the Faculty of Physics and Mathematics of Petrograd State University. However, he soon returned to Cherikov, where he taught mathematics and physics. In 1922, he enrolled at the Kyiv Institute of People's Education, graduating in 1923, while simultaneously working as a mathematics teacher in Kyiv schools. In 1925, he began postgraduate studies under the supervision of Dmitry Grave. In 1928, he defended his dissertation titled “Aerodynamic Studies”, which, despite their applied nature, contained important mathematical results.

In 1933, at the invitation of S. N. Bernstein, he moved to Kharkiv. In 1934, he was elected a corresponding member of the All-Ukrainian Academy of Sciences (the former name of the National Academy of Sciences of Ukraine). In 1935, Akhiezer became director of the Ukrainian Research Institute of Mathematics and Mechanics, established on Bernstein’s initiative. With interruptions caused by World War II and several postwar years, he held this position until the institute was closed in 1950. He attracted prominent mathematicians such as N. G. Chebotaryov and M. G. Krein to work at the institute. Between 1934 and 1940, together with M. G. Krein, he published a substantial series of joint works devoted to approximation theory and the moment problem of Markov.

In the postwar years, he headed the Department of Function Theory and later the Department of Mathematical Physics at Kharkiv University, as well as the Department of Mathematical Physics at the Kharkiv Polytechnic Institute. From 1947 until the end of his life, Akhiezer chaired the Kharkiv Mathematical Society and edited its scientific journal. In 1958, he was invited as a plenary speaker to the International Congress of Mathematicians in Edinburgh (the lecture did not take place). In the 1960s, on the initiative of B. I. Verkin, the B. Verkin Institute for Low Temperature Physics and Engineering of the Academy of Sciences of the Ukrainian SSR was established. In 1961–1963, Akhiezer headed the Department of Function Theory there while continuing his work at the university. In 1963, on his initiative, a specialized physics and mathematics school No. 27 was established in Kharkiv (now Kharkiv Physics and Mathematics Lyceum No. 27).

== Contributions ==
Akhiezer obtained important results in approximation theory, in particular in extremal problems, where he applied methods of the geometric theory of functions of a complex variable. His idea of using conformal mappings in these problems (in combination with classical Chebyshev methods) provided a new perspective on the study of functions that deviate least from zero. He established a fundamental connection between the inverse problem for important classes of second-order differential and finite-difference operators with a finite number of spectral gaps and the inversion problem for Jacobi elliptic integrals. This connection led to explicit solutions of the inverse problem for operators with a finite number of spectral gaps. In the early 1960s, while studying this inverse spectral problem for Schrödinger operators with a finite number of spectral gaps, he introduced a class of functions now known as Baker–Akhiezer functions, which have played an important role in the theory of nonlinear integrable equations over the past 50 years.

== Monographs ==
Akhiezer, N. I. The Classical Moment Problem. Kharkiv: Gostekhizdat of the Ukrainian SSR, 1938. 84 pp. (Original Russian: Klassicheskaya problema momentov. Expanded edition: Moscow: Fizmatlit, 1961.)

Akhiezer, N. I.; Krein, M. G. Some Questions in the Theory of Moments. Kharkiv: GONTI of the Ukrainian SSR, 1938. 256 pp. (Original Russian: O nekotorykh voprosakh teorii momentov; English edition: American Mathematical Society, 1962.)

Akhiezer, N. I. Lectures on the Theory of Approximation. Moscow; Leningrad: Gostekhizdat, 1947. 323 pp. (2nd rev. ed.: Moscow: Nauka, 1956; English editions: Frederick Ungar Publishing Co., 1956; Dover Publications, 1992.)

Akhiezer, N. I. Elements of the Theory of Elliptic Functions. Moscow; Leningrad: Gostekhizdat, 1948. 291 pp. (2nd rev. ed.: Moscow: Nauka, 1970; English edition: American Mathematical Society, 1990.)

Akhiezer, N. I.; Glazman, I. M. Theory of Linear Operators in Hilbert Space. Moscow: Nauka, 1966. 544 pp. (3rd rev. ed.: Kharkiv University Press, 1977; English edition: Frederick Ungar Publishing Co., 1961; Dover Publications, 1993.)

Akhiezer, N. I. Theory of Approximation. Moscow: Nauka, 1956. 472 pp.

== Lecture courses and textbooks ==
Akhiezer, N. I. Lectures on the Calculus of Variations. Kharkiv: Gostekhizdat, 1955.

Akhiezer, N. I. Lectures on Integral Transforms. Kharkiv: Vishcha Shkola, 1984.

== Other works ==
Akhiezer, N. I. Academician S. N. Bernstein and His Work on the Constructive Theory of Functions. Kharkiv: Kharkiv State University, 1955.

== Collected works ==
Akhiezer, N. I. Selected Works on Function Theory and Mathematical Physics. Kharkiv: Acta, 2001. Vols. 1–2.

== Legacy ==
- The Naum I. Akhiezer Foundation was established in his memory to support young mathematicians in Kharkiv.
- In October 2001, a memorial plaque honouring N. I. Akhiezer was installed on the building of Kharkiv Physics and Mathematics Lyceum No. 27 (12/14 Mar’yinska Street, Kharkiv).
- On 24 May 2018, another memorial plaque dedicated to Akhiezer was unveiled in Kharkiv at

17 Bahaliya Street, where the mathematician had lived.

- The Akhiezer–Krein–Favard constant is named after him.
- The Baker–Akhiezer functions are also named in his honour.
- A street in Kharkiv, Akhiezeriv Street, is named after the brothers Naum I. Akhiezer and

Aleksandr I. Akhiezer.
