= Leonid Pastur =

Ukrainian physicist (born 1937)

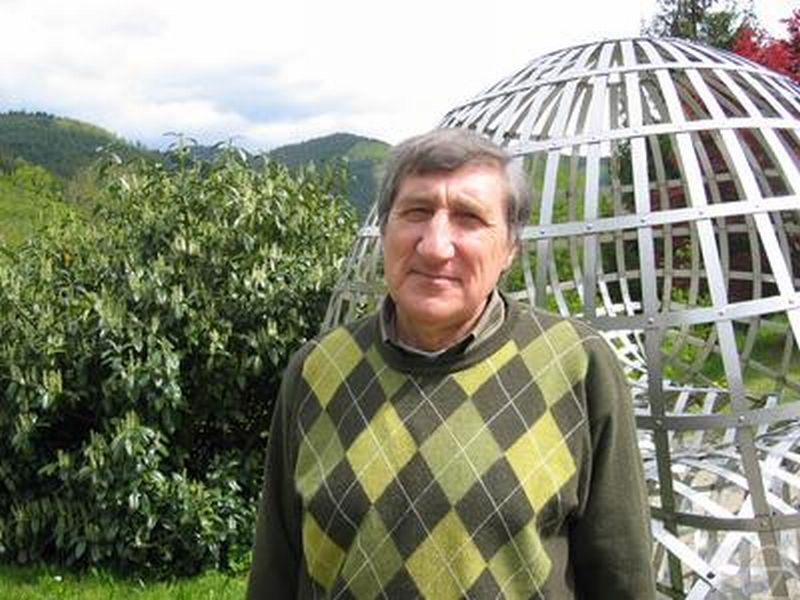
Leonid Pastur in 2004

Leonid Andreevich Pastur (Ukrainian: Леонід Андрійович Пастур, Russian: Леонид Андреевич Пастур) (born 21 August 1937) is a Ukrainian mathematical physicist and theoretical physicist, known in particular for contributions to random matrix theory, the spectral theory of random Schrödinger operators, statistical mechanics, and solid state physics (especially, the theory of disordered systems). Currently, he heads the Department of Theoretical Physics at the B Verkin Institute for Low Temperature Physics and Engineering in Kharkiv and a professor and senior research fellow at the Department of Mathematics, King's College London.

== Biography ==
Pastur was born on 21 August 1937 in the village of Udych, Dzhulynka Raion, Vinnytsia Oblast. In 1955, he graduated from secondary school in Mariupol.

In 1961, he graduated from the Faculty of Engineering and Physics of the Kharkiv Polytechnic Institute and began working at the B. Verkin Institute for Low Temperature Physics and Engineering of the National Academy of Sciences of Ukraine in Kharkiv. He progressed from junior research fellow in 1961 to deputy director and head of the Institute's Department of Mathematics from 1987 to 1997.

From 1985 to 1997, he simultaneously headed the Department of Statistical Methods in Mathematical Physics.

From 2003 to 2017, he was head of the Department of Theoretical Physics, and from 2017 he has been a chief research fellow in the department.

From 1978 to 1994, he was a professor at Kharkiv State University, and from 1995 to 2004 he was a professor at the University of Paris.

He received an honorary doctorate from Ruhr University Bochum in Germany in 2011.

He received an honorary doctorate from V. N. Karazin Kharkiv National University in 2013.

He received an honorary doctorate from the Bogolyubov Institute for Theoretical Physics of the National Academy of Sciences of Ukraine in 2018.

== Work ==
- In random matrix theory: together with Vladimir Marchenko, he discovered the Marchenko–Pastur law. Later, he devised a more general approach to study random matrices with independent entries in the global regime. Together with Mariya Shcherbina, he found the first rigorous proof of universality for invariant matrix ensembles.
- In the spectral theory of random Schrödinger operators, he introduced the class of metrically transitive operators, and discovered several fundamental properties of this class. Together with Ilya Goldsheid and Stanislav Molchanov, he established Anderson localization for a class of one-dimensional self-adjoint operators with random potentials; this was the first mathematically rigorous proof of Anderson localization.

== Awards and honors ==
He is a member of the National Academy of Sciences of Ukraine. In 2012 he became a fellow of the American Mathematical Society. In 2025, he was awarded the Senior Whitehead Prize
