= Volodymyr Marchenko =

Ukrainian mathematician (1922–2026)

Volodymyr Olexandrovych Marchenko (Ukrainian: Володимир Олександрович Марченко; 7 July 1922 – 1 January 2026) was a Ukrainian mathematician who specialised in mathematical physics.

== Life and career ==
Marchenko was born in Kharkiv on 7 July 1922. He defended his PhD thesis in 1948 under the supervision of Naum Landkof, and in 1951, he defended his DSc thesis. He worked in Kharkiv University until 1961. For four decades, he headed the Mathematical Physics Department at the Verkin Institute for Low Temperature Physics and Engineering of the National Academy of Sciences of Ukraine.

He was awarded the Lenin Prize in 1962, the N.N. Krylov Prize in 1980, the State Prize of Ukraine in Science and Technology in 1989, and the N. N. Bogolyubov prize in 1996. Since 1969 he was a member of the National Academy of Sciences of Ukraine, since 1987 of the Russian Academy of Sciences and since 2001 of the Royal Norwegian Society of Sciences and Letters.

Marchenko turned 100 on 7 July 2022, and died in Toronto on 1 January 2026, at the age of 103.

== Work ==
=== Differential operators ===
Marchenko made fundamental contributions to the analysis of the Sturm–Liouville operators. He introduced one of the approaches to the inverse scattering problem for Sturm–Liouville operators, and derived what is now called the Marchenko equation.

=== Random matrices ===
Together with Leonid Pastur, Volodymyr Marchenko discovered the Marchenko–Pastur law in random matrix theory.

=== Homogenization ===
Together with E. Ya. Khruslov, Marchenko authored one of the first mathematical books on homogenization.

== Awards ==
- Order of Prince Yaroslav the Wise, III class (24 August 2017) - for significant personal contribution to state-building, socio-economic, scientific, technical, cultural and educational development of Ukraine, significant labor achievements and high professionalism
- Order of Prince Yaroslav the Wise, IV class (20 August 2007) - for significant personal contribution to the socio-economic, cultural development of the Ukrainian state, significant labor achievements and on the occasion of the 16th anniversary of Ukraine's independence
- Order of Prince Yaroslav the Wise, V class (16 July 2002) - for significant personal contribution to the development of national science, many years of fruitful activity
- Two Orders of the Red Banner of Labour (1967 and 1972)
- Honorary citizen of Kharkiv Oblast (2007)

== Selected publications ==
- Marčenko, V. A.; Khruslov, E. Ya. (1974), Boundary value problems in domains with a fine-grained boundary (in Russian), Kiev: Naukova Dumka, MR 0601059. The second edition was translated into English: Marchenko, V. A.; Khruslov, E. Ya. (2006), Homogenization of partial differential equations, Progress in Mathematical Physics, vol. 46, Boston, MA: Birkhäuser Boston, Inc., ISBN 978-0-8176-4351-5, MR 2182441
- Marchenko, V. A. (2011), Sturm-Liouville operators and applications (2 ed.), Providence: American Mathematical Society, doi:10.1090/chel/373, ISBN 978-0-8218-5316-0, MR 2798059.
