= Cramér's decomposition theorem =

Theorem in probability theory

Cramér's decomposition theorem is a result in probability theory. It is well known that if random variables $\xi_1$ and $\xi_2$ are independent and normally distributed, then their sum is also normally distributed. It turns out that the converse statement is also true. This result was anticipated by Paul Lévy and proved by Harald Cramér. As a consequence, a new direction in probability theory emerged—the theory of decompositions of random variables into independent summands (the arithmetic of probability distributions).

== Statement of the theorem ==
Let a random variable $\xi$ have a normal distribution and admit a representation as a sum of two independent random variables, $\xi=\xi_1+\xi_2$. Then the random variables $\xi_1$ and $\xi_2$ are also normally distributed.

The proof of the theorem is based on the theory of entire functions. It follows from the Cramér decomposition theorem that the normal distribution belongs to the Linnik class $I_0$.

== Generalizations to locally compact Abelian groups ==
The following theorem gives a complete description of locally compact Abelian groups on which Cramér's decomposition theorem holds.

Theorem, see also. Let $\xi$, $\xi_1$, and $\xi_2$ be random variables taking values in a second countable locally compact Abelian group $X$. Suppose that $\xi$ has a Gaussian distribution and that $\xi_1$ and $\xi_2$ are independent. Then the equality $\xi=\xi_1+\xi_2$ implies that $\xi_1$ and $\xi_2$ also have Gaussian distributions if and only if the group $X$ contains no subgroups topologically isomorphic to the circle group.

== See also ==
- Raikov's theorem
