= Gaussian distribution on a locally compact Abelian group =

Gaussian distribution on a locally compact Abelian group is a generalization of the classical normal distribution. Roughly speaking, it extends the concept of a normal distribution from the Euclidean space to more general topological groups, i.e., when the group is $\mathbb{R}^n$, it coincides with the usual multivariate normal distribution. It was introduced by Kalyanapuram Rangachari Parthasarathy, Ranga Rao, and Srinivasa R. S. Varadhan in 1963, see also. This distribution plays an important role in the representation of characteristic functions of infinitely divisible distributions, the arithmetic of probability distributions, and in characterization problems of mathematical statistics on locally compact Abelian groups.

== Definition ==
Let $X$ be a second countable locally compact Abelian group, let $Y$ be its character group, and let $(x,y)$ denote the value of a character $y \in Y$ at an element $x \in X$.

A probability distribution $\gamma$ on the group $X$ is called Gaussian if its characteristic function (Fourier transform) is of the form

$\hat{\gamma}(y) = (x,y)\exp\{-\varphi(y)\},$

where $\varphi$ is a continuous non-negative function on $Y$ satisfying the functional equation

$\varphi(u+v)+\varphi(u-v)=2\bigl[\varphi(u)+\varphi(v)\bigr], \quad u,v\in Y.$

A Gaussian distribution is called symmetric if $x = 0$.

== Properties ==
1. A Gaussian distribution is infinitely divisible.

2. The support of a Gaussian distribution is a coset of a closed connected subgroup of $X$.

3. A symmetric Gaussian distribution is a continuous homomorphic image of a Gaussian distribution on a linear space (either finite-dimensional $\mathbb{R}^n$ or infinite-dimensional $\mathbb{R}^\infty$, the space of all sequences with product topology).

4. Let $X$ be connected. If $X$ is not locally connected, then every Gaussian distribution on $X$ is singular with respect to the Haar measure on $X$, whereas if $X$ is locally connected and finite-dimensional, then any Gaussian distribution on $X$ is either absolutely continuous or singular with respect to the Haar measure on $X$. The corresponding question for infinite-dimensional locally connected groups remains open, although both types of Gaussian distributions on such groups can be constructed.

5. On finite-dimensional connected groups, any two Gaussian distributions are either mutually absolutely continuous or mutually singular.
