= B. Verkin Institute for Low Temperature Physics and Engineering of the National Academy of Sciences of Ukraine =

Research institute in Kharkiv, Ukraine

Coordinates: 50.0396°N 36.2202°E

- Фізико-технічний інститут низьких температур імені Б. І. Вєркіна НАН України
- Other names: ILTPE
- Established: 1960
- Director: Dolbin Oleksandr Vitol'dovich
- Location: Kharkiv, Ukraine
- Website: Institute for Low Temperature
- 47 Nauky Ave., Kharkiv 61103, Ukraine

The B. Verkin Institute for Low Temperature Physics and Engineering of the National Academy of Sciences of Ukraine (Ukrainian: Фізико-технічний інститут низьких температур імені Б. І. Вєркіна Національної академії наук України) is a research institute in Kharkiv, Ukraine, that conducts basic research in experimental and theoretical physics, mathematics, as well as in the field of applied physics. It was founded in 1960 by Borys Verkin, Oleksandr Galkin, Borys Eselson and Ihor Dmytrenko. Its first director was Borys Verkin.

Main areas of research are high-temperature superconductivity, weak superconductivity, magneto antiferromagnets, physics of low-dimensional systems, point-contact spectroscopy, quantum crystals, nonlinear phenomena in metals, physics of disordered systems, quantum phenomena in plasticity and others. The institute has published about 250 monographs, textbooks, reference books, more than 12,000 articles and reviews in ranking scientific journals, and has trained more than 850 highly qualified PhD experts.

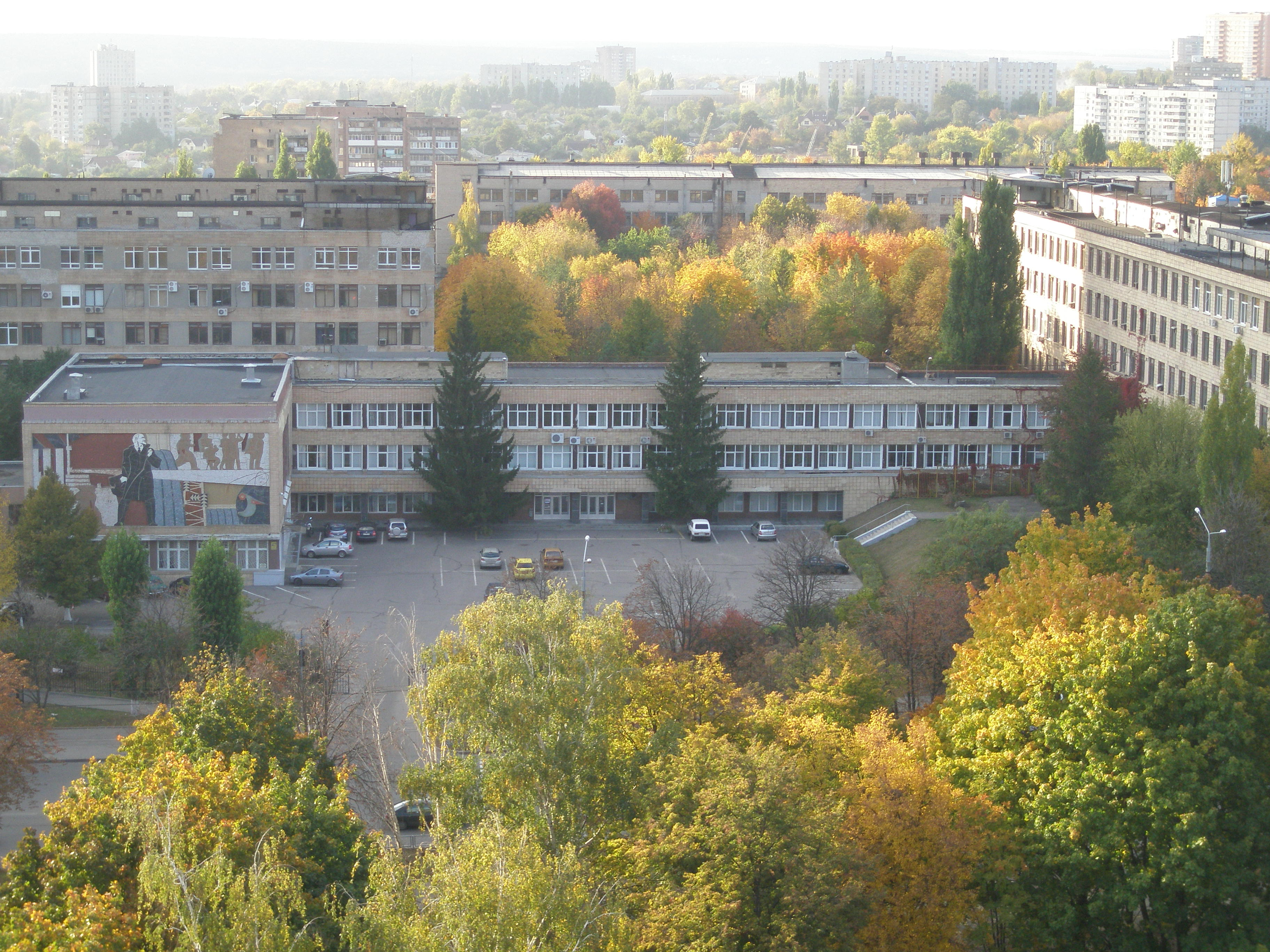
B Verkin Institute for Low Temperature Physics and Engineering of the National Academy of Sciences of Ukraine

== History ==
On May 13, 1960, the presidium of the National Academy of Sciences of Ukraine issued a decision to establish the Kharkiv Physics and Technical Institute for Low Temperatures on the initiative of several scientists from the Ukrainian Institute of Physics and Technology.

The institute was created by nine laboratories involved in low temperature physics. Four math departments were also established. In 1987 they were organized into the ILTPE Mathematical Division.

In 1991 ILTPE was named after its founder, Borys Verkin.

== Directors ==
- 1960–1988 Borys Verkin
- 1988–1991 Anatolii Zvyagin
- 1991–2006 Viktor Yeremenko
- 2006–2020 Serhiy Hnatchenko
- 2021–2024 Yurii Naidyuk
- 2024 Acting Director Oleksandr Dolbin

== Structure ==
=== Physics departments ===
- Department of Magnetism
- Department of Optical and Magnetic Properties of Solids
- Department of Magnetic and Elastic Properties of Solids
- Department of Physics of Real Crystals
- Department of Thermal Properties and Structure of Solids and Nanosystems
- Department of Physics of Quantum Fluids and Crystals
- Department of Spectroscopy of Molecular Systems and Nanostructured Materials
- Department of Superconducting and Mesoscopic Structures
- Department of Molecular Biophysics
- Department of Point-Contact Spectroscopy
- Department of Theoretical Physics

=== Mathematical Division ===
- Department of Mathematical Physics
- Department of Differential Equations and Geometry
- Department of Function Theory

=== Scientific and technical departments ===
- Department of Information Systems
- Department of low-temperatures and space materials

== Publications ==
ILTPE publishes two scientific journals included on a list of leading peer-reviewed scientific journals and publications:

- Low Temperature Physics, published since January 1975 in Russian, as well as the American Institute of Physics in English under the title Low Temperature Physics 1997. Published monthly, the magazine has Ukraine's highest impact factor of scientific journals.
- Journal of Mathematical Physics, Analysis, Geometry, published since 2005. Published quarterly in English. (The journal was founded in 1994 and was formerly known as Matematicheskaya Fizika, Analiz, Geometriya until July 2005.)
