= Bobrinsky (surname) =

Bobrinsky or Bobrinski, feminine: Bobrinskaya (Russian: Бобринский, Бобринская) is a surname associated with the Russian noble family of Bobrinsky. Notable people with the surname include:

- Aleksei Aleksandrovich Bobrinsky (1852–1927), Russian historian and statesman
- Aleksey Grigorievich Bobrinsky (1762–1813), founder of the Bobrinsky family
- Georgiy Bobrinsky (1863 – 1928), Russian military and statesman
- Nadezhda Aleksandrovna Bobrinskaya (1865–1920), Russian astronomer and humanitarian volunteer
- Nikolay Alekseyevich Bobrinski (1890–1964), Russian zoologist and biogeographer
- Sofia Dolgorukova née Countess Bobrinsky (1887–1949), Russian surgeon, pilot and racing driver
