= Sofia Dolgorukova =

- Born: Countess Sofia Alekseevna Bobrinskaya; 25 December 1887; Saint Petersburg, Russian Empire
- Died: 8 December 1949 (aged 61); Paris, France
- Noble family: Bobrinsky
- Spouses: Pyotr Aleksandrovich Dolgorukov; Pyotr Petrovich Volkonsky
- Issue: Sofka Skipwith
- Father: Aleksei Bobrinsky
- Mother: Nadezhda Aleksandrovna Polovtsova
- Occupation: aviator

Princess Sofia Alekseevna Dolgorukova (Russian: София Алексеевна Долгорукова, née Countess Bobrinskaya, later Princess Volkonskaya by her second marriage; 25 December 1887 – 12 December 1949) was a Russian surgeon, courtier, and one of the first female aviators in the Russian Empire.

== Early life and marriages ==
Sofia Alekseevna was born in Saint Petersburg into a prominent aristocratic family. Her father, Count Aleksey Aleksandrovich Bobrinsky, was a senator, Upper Chamberlain, and Chairman of the Imperial Archaeological Commission. Her mother, Nadezhda Aleksandrovna Polovtsova, was among Russia's earliest female astronomers. Her maternal grandfather, State Secretary Aleksandr Polovtsov, noted her birth in his diary on 25 December 1887: "Friday, at 7 a.m., my daughter Bobrinskaya gave birth to a fourth daughter, named Sofia." She was baptized on 24 January 1888. Showcasing an early talent for the exact sciences, she was also an avid reader and wrote poetry. Alongside her sisters Ekaterina and Domna, she was appointed a maid of honor at the Imperial Court on 1 January 1907.

In early 1907, she married Prince Pyotr Aleksandrovich Dolgorukov (1883–1925), a staff captain in the Horse Guards.The marriage was unhappy and ended in divorce in 1913. Their only daughter, Sofka, was raised primarily by her paternal grandmother, Princess Olga Petrovna Dolgorukova. Under Soviet rule in Petrograd, Sofia Alekseevna remarried on 12 November 1918 to the diplomat Prince Pyotr Petrovich Volkonsky (1872–1957).

== Medical career ==
Dolgorukova graduated from the Women's Medical Institute in Saint Petersburg, practicing as a hospital surgeon from 1907 to 1912.

During the Second Balkan War (1913), she joined the Russian medical mission. When a severe cholera epidemic broke out in Serbia, she set up and managed an isolation facility in the town of Kočani. For her work in the cholera camp, she received a personal commendation and an award from King Peter I of Serbia.

== Aviation and racing ==
Beyond medicine, she was deeply passionate about motoring and joined the Imperial Russian Automobile Society. She was the only woman among 48 drivers to compete in the 3,200-kilometer Kiev Automobile Rally for the prize of Emperor Nicholas II, held from 16 to 29 June 1910.

By the early 1910s, her interests shifted to aviation. In 1912, she underwent primary flight training at the Chartres Pilot School operated by Louis Blériot in Paris. Returning to Russia, she enrolled in the pilot school of the Imperial All-Russian Aero Club (IVAK) and earned pilot license No. 234 on 5 April 1914 (18 April New Style).

== World War I service ==
At the outbreak of World War I, she petitioned the Ministry of War to join the military air service but was rejected due to her gender. Instead, she went to the front as a sister of mercy, where she was awarded the Cross of St. George for bravery.

Following the February Revolution of 1917, the Provisional Government's War Minister, Aleksandr Kerensky, opened combat roles to women. Dolgorukova volunteered for the air service and was assigned to the 26th Corps Air Squadron alongside Elena Samsonova, where she is believed to have flown several reconnaissance missions as a pilot or observer.

== Later life and exile ==
Following the Bolshevik victory in the October Revolution, she remained in Soviet Russia for a short time. Worried for her daughter's safety, she left for England in 1919. In 1921, she returned to the Russian SFSR to successfully secure her husband's release from prison, after which they escaped back to London.

By 1926, she had moved to France, where she obtained a French driver's license and worked as a taxi driver to support her family. Her husband brought in money through translation, accounting, and secretarial work. Throughout 1927–1928, he worked at Count Ginzberg's casino in Dieppe, where Sofia Alekseevna also found employment as a guide and translator. From 1928, she worked as a secretary to the Marquis de Ganay.

During the German occupation of Paris, she visited her daughter in September 1942, who was then held in an internment camp. Dolgorukova died in France on 12 December 1949 (some sources note 8 December) and was buried in the Batignolles Cemetery in Paris.
