= Sofka Skipwith =

Russian princess

- Righteous Among the Nations; British Hero of the Holocaust
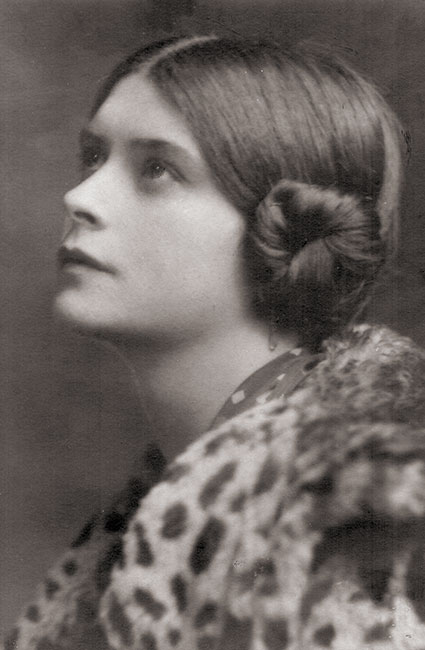
- Sofka Skipwith (c. 1925)
- Born: Princess Sophia Petrovna Dolgorukova; 23 October 1907; Saint Petersburg, Russian Empire
- Died: 26 February 1994 (aged 86); Bodmin Moor, Cornwall, England
- Noble family: Dolgorouky
- Spouses: Leo Zinovieff; Grey d'Estoteville Townsend Skipwith
- Issue: Peter Zinovieff; Ian Fitzlyon; Patrick Skipwith, 12th Baronet Skipwith
- Father: Prince Peter Dolgorouky
- Mother: Countess Sofia Alekseevna Bobrinskaya
- Occupation: Stenographer

Sofka Skipwith (born Sophia Petrovna Dolgorukova, Russian: Софи́я Петро́вна Долгору́кова; 23 October 1907 – 26 February 1994) was a Russian princess who, after working for Laurence Olivier and being interned by the Nazis in France in World War II, worked to save Jews from the Holocaust. She was honoured for her efforts by both the British government and by Israel, where she has been named one of the Righteous Among the Nations by Yad Vashem.

== Life ==
=== Childhood ===
Skipwith was the only child of Prince Peter Dolgorukov and Countess Sophy Bobrinskaya (of House Bobrinsky). Her parents were married in 1907 in a service at a private church in the Winter Palace, followed by a service at the Bobrinsky Palace; the Romanov imperial family were in attendance. Skipwith's granddaughter in her biography Red Princess: A Revolutionary Life repeats her grandmother's claim that the "wedding was considered the most brilliant of the 1907 season."

On her father's side, Skipwith was descended from Rurik, Prince of Novgorod, but also from a Greek slave-girl whom a Polish count won from an Austrian prince in a card game. Skipwith's paternal grandfather, "Sandik," was Grand Marshal of the Imperial Court and Master of Ceremonies; Skipwith remembered him as ""a rather terrifying figure.'"

On her mother's side she was descended from Catherine the Great's illegitimate son, Count Bobrinsky, and also from a foundling (abandoned child) who was probably the child of the Tsar's brother. As a young girl in Saint Petersburg, she occasionally played with the Tsarevich. Her mother, Sophy, whose father was the Marshal of the Russian Nobility, president of the Union of the Nobility of the Russian Provinces, and a Knight of the Order of Saint Alexander Nevsky, studied medicine and became a respected surgeon, learned to fly in 1913 and was one of the first female bomber pilots, was the only female participant in a motor rally from St. Petersburg to Kiev in 1912, and also published satirical poetry under a pseudonym.

In 1916, Sofia Alekseevna returned from medical service in the Russian military with malaria and two St. George crosses, and after the October Revolution she re-entered Bolshevik Russia and secured the release of her second husband from prison, and subsequently supported him in Paris by driving a taxi. She gave her daughter a diminutive of her name. Skipwith's parents divorced when she was four, and she grew up mainly with her paternal grandmother and an English governess.

When the Revolution occurred, Skipwith's grandmother took her with her to Crimea, where she was in attendance as lady-in-waiting to the Dowager Empress Marie, and in the spring of 1919 they were evacuated in a large party of aristocrats with the Empress to England. Skipwith was raised in Bath, London, Rome, Budapest (where her stepfather was representing the still recognised Russian Imperial government and where her mother decided she should be "out"), Nice, Paris and finally Dieppe.

During her time in London she "thoroughly enjoyed" going to school at Queen's College, where she earned a School Certificate, and met the Duke and Duchess of Hamilton. She became close friends with their daughter Margaret Douglas-Hamilton, who was almost exactly the same age, visited them numerous times, and after Margaret was expelled from school, was invited back from Rome to stay for six months and study with a governess with her; the two finally drove the governess to "throwing everything moveable" at them.

In Nice, she studied at the Lycée, managed to pass the Certificat d'Etudes Secondaires, but did not even try to pass the Baccalauréat. In Rome, she had her first love affair and also read avidly, influenced by a Russian librarian at the English Library.

=== Secretarial work ===
On her mother's suggestion, Skipwith qualified as a French and English shorthand-typist at the Ecole Pigier in Dieppe and at 21, after a series of unsatisfactory temporary jobs, became the Duchess of Hamilton's secretary. This included speaking with her at events on behalf of the Animal Defence and Anti-Vivisection Society, and organising the wedding of Margaret and James Drummond-Hay, at which she was one of twelve bridesmaids in rainbow colours. In her memoirs, she tells of the butler bursting in on her while she was dressing for the pre-wedding dinner, taking no notice of her being "attired in nothing but bra and panties": "'Your Highness', he gasped . . . 'I can't do it. Lord Malcolm has telephoned that there will be eight more to dinner'", whereupon she and "a couple of footmen" saved the day with an arrangement of trestle tables in a passage. She also pretended to have lost her refugee Nansen passport and so acquired a British passport.

In 1931 she married Leo Zinovieff, also a Russian aristocrat whose family had fled the Revolution. He was an engineer, having learned English in a cram school at 15 and then taken first place at the City and Guilds Engineering College. For eighteen months she worked only intermittently, translated her mother's book, and went to and gave parties. Then as the Great Depression deepened, her husband was let go, and she was unable to work as a secretary because of continuing morning sickness with her first pregnancy. They managed on rent from most of their house, typing, proofreading and envelope-stuffing work, and loans and gifts of "grouse and partridge" from friends. After the birth of her son Peter, Skipwith signed up with the Universal Aunts temps agency and also taught Russian at Davies', an agency which provided coaching for the Foreign Service examinations. Through Universal Aunts, she began working for Laurence Olivier and his wife Jill Esmond and soon was working there five days a week.

=== Second marriage and wartime internment ===
She and Zinovieff separated amicably and after her second son was born, divorced following the instructions in A.P. Herbert's Holy Deadlock and guidance from a solicitor. Shortly after the Oliviers separated, she married Grey Skipwith, heir to a baronetcy, and they lived for a while in the Oliviers' house in Cheyne Walk. Olivier gave them as a wedding present a replica of his own then unusually large bed, with appropriate-sized linen and blankets. They decided to leave London for the children's sakes and leased Dean Cottage in Cookham Dean, near Maidenhead. After her third son was born in September 1938, they decided to relocate to Paris and concentrate on translating; they arranged a rental and were to have moved in September 1939 – they spent the summer travelling with a troupe of Cossacks, camping with their dog at each stop – but the outbreak of World War II made moving to Paris impossible and since they had given up the lease at Cookham Dean, they pitched their tent on the public house lawn before moving back to Chelsea.

Skipwith's husband joined the military, first a patrol boat and then the RAF. She was worried about her mother, who had been depending on the money she sent her, and during the Phoney War secured a visa through connections, went to Paris for a month and paid her mother's and stepfather's rent for six months. However, on her second trip in mid-May 1940, she was trapped in Paris when the Germans occupied it, and three days before she was to have been smuggled out of the country, was rounded up with other British nationals and sent to an internment camp at Besançon. In May 1941 they were transferred to a multinational show camp located in the Grand Hotel and other spa hotels at Vittel. (She and her friends were indignant at the overly rosy picture of the camp in the film Two Thousand Women, which they saw in 1947.) In 1942 she was informed that her husband's plane had been shot down and later that he was dead.

During her time in internment, Skipwith repeatedly tried to help people escape, and smuggled messages and cigarettes and other items from Red Cross parcels to the French Resistance, especially after about 250 Polish Jews who had paid for useless certifications of South American citizenship arrived at a separate part of the camp. She wrote out the list of their names in tiny script on cigarette papers and sent multiple copies via the French Communist Party to Geneva and to Spain, which was supposedly representing the South American countries. In 1985 Skipwith learned from Abraham Oppenheim, a researcher at the London School of Economics, that thanks to her list of names, over 50 of the Vittel Jews had been taken from a transport to Auschwitz and were among 222 Jews exchanged for Germans and sent to Palestine. One eleven-year-old girl was sent out to be hidden by a local family. Skipwith and a friend smuggled a baby out under the fence in a basket. One woman feigned paralysis with the assistance of the Jewish camp doctor and so saved herself and her children. But the majority who had not killed themselves when the transport trains arrived at Vittel were shot after staging a rebellion on arrival at the death camp; for many years, all Skipwith knew was that they had been taken to the gas chambers despite her efforts to contact their relatives.

Skipwith was repatriated to England in August 1944, after having refused earlier opportunities to continue trying to help the Poles. During the long, circuitous train journey to neutral Lisbon, she and her friend were given special treatment by the Gestapo, who had misinterpreted instructions from the camp Kommandant to pay special attention to them; they were recruited to go to Berlin to make propaganda broadcasts and played along to get the address of the contact.

Olivier immediately had her hired as secretary of the Old Vic Theatre Company. When war ended in Europe, she went with the company on a seven-week ENSA tour, playing to audiences of servicemen, during which she saw the ruins of Hamburg and the Bergen-Belsen concentration camp, and the company played at the Comédie-Française.

=== Post-war ===
In 1946 Skipwith left the Old Vic to pay more attention to her young son, resumed working for Universal Aunts, and devoted much of her time to the Communist Party. She started a pot-luck party after the pubs closed called 'Sofka's Saturday Soups', covertly using horsemeat to solve the problem of meat rationing; she later published a cookery book called Eat Russian.

In 1948, at forty, armed with a letter of recommendation from Olivier that began: "I have known Sofka Skipwith, man and boy, for fifteen years. She has been private secretary, company secretary, play-reader and present help in time of trouble", she returned to Paris. At this point her 1968 memoir breaks off except for a vignette when she revisited her old home in Leningrad in 1957. Her granddaughter's biography explains that she lived with the cousin who had arranged for her to leave occupied Paris, and when she was contemplating starting a boarding house on the Riviera, was hired to run Progressive Tours, a Communist travel agency which in Skipwith's words aimed "to create opportunities for the working people of Britain to meet the ordinary people of other countries – surely the best way to overcome prejudice and intolerance, to counter the threat of another war". Its tours to Eastern Europe were for several years the only break in the Iron Curtain, and it was the only branch of the Communist Party which made money. In February 1957, she was the first Western travel agent to enter Communist Albania. However, her cousin had debilitating headaches from a war injury; when he was given a lobotomy, he soon became mentally incompetent and Skipwith returned to find he had sold their cottage in Gif, outside Paris, at a rock-bottom price and bought two unheated stables. According to her granddaughter, this was when she came closest to committing suicide; instead she left him and as she later put it, lived in trains during the late fifties; when not touring, she stayed with friends.

On one of her tours to the USSR, she met a trades unionist, marathon runner and track and field coach from Shepherd's Bush; after she moved back to London late in 1957, they moved together into a house her youngest son bought for them when he came of age and received an inheritance. In 1962 they used his savings to buy "a primitive stone cottage in the middle of Bodmin Moor". They renovated it, Skipwith wrote her memoirs and worked on a second volume, and she stopped working for Progressive Tours in 1964. They both preferred seclusion in their retirement – visitors were ordered to spend the day outside and given a departure time. Skipwith died of heart failure in February 1994, shortly after having appeared on a Timewatch documentary about Rasputin; her partner died ten years later. According to her granddaughter, Skipwith "always felt herself to be firstly a Russian, claiming jokily that 'All Russians are crazy!'" She died in 1994 in Cornwall.

== Political and social convictions ==
Skipwith described herself as having been concerned with economic inequality since childhood. In St. Petersburg she heard from one of her grandmother's servants that people were starving, and smuggled cakes to him to give to the poor, and in Crimea she made friends and discussed raids on nearby estates with the lodge-keeper's grandsons; their father and the servant were both members of the local Soviet. In Rome her "instinctive socialism" was fired by reading political literature. Shortly after she started working for the Duchess of Hamilton, she assisted in her son Douglas's campaign as Unionist candidate for the impoverished constituency of Govan, in Glasgow, but was shocked by the conditions in which the people lived and more impressed by the incumbent Labour MP. The experience of poverty after her first husband lost his job convinced her of "the injustice of the social set-up, the obviously false division of mankind into class society", whereas he "merely [felt it was] bad luck that we happened to be on the wrong side". In 1933, after the birth of her first son, the couple both felt the nursing home should be investigated for mistreatment of babies and failure to pay staff, so she worked there as a bookkeeper until she had enough information to report the proprietor, who was sent to prison; the one nurse with nowhere to go, Skipwith employed as a nanny.

She and her second husband tried to read Marx and Lenin but found them too difficult; she finally joined the Communist Party while interned, as the culmination of political discussions with her roommates. After repatriation she joined the British Communist Party and was active for years, including her work for the travel agency, and in the late 1960s she edited the first issue of Albanian Life magazine and published a book called A Short Guide to the People's Republic of Albania. With the Secretary of the Chelsea Labour Party, she started a branch of the British-Soviet Society. She was one of four people who started a left-wing news digest called Front Page Review, which folded after two issues for lack of funds. In 1949 she was an interpreter at the World Peace Congress, then produced the journal In Defence of Peace, sometimes working alone. But she became distanced from the party as she aged, although she remained supportive of the Soviets and fantasised about returning to the USSR to live. In her last years she was preoccupied with the Holocaust, pressing books on the subject on friends.

She was an unembarrassed advocate of birth control, recommending "the cap" to embarrassed visitors and assisting French women in coming to England to be fitted for them by a friend who was a doctor. In her biography, her granddaughter describes her as "highly sexed" and investigates the many lovers whom she did not mention in her memoir. She told her youngest son she had had over 100 lovers and wrote to her partner in 1958: "As you know, over these years I've gone to bed merrily with anyone who seemed pleasant and entertaining. It was an agreeable pastime, good exercise and meant a very little for a week or two, a day or two, an evening".

== Honours ==
In 1985, she received a letter from Yad Vashem indicating that she was being considered for an award as Righteous among the Nations for her efforts to save the Jews at the Vittel internment camp. She was given the award posthumously in 1998. In March 2010 she was also one of 27 people to receive the special United Kingdom honour of British Hero of the Holocaust, all but two posthumously.

== Children ==
- Peter Zinovieff, 1933–2021
- Ian Zinovieff Fitzlyon, 1935–2023
- Sir Patrick Skipwith, 12th Baronet Skipwith, 1938–2016
