= Trepov =

Trepov (feminine: Trepova) is a Russian surname. Notable people with the name include:

- Alexander Trepov (1862–1928), Prime Minister of the Russian Empire
- Darya Trepova (born 1997), Russian political activist and convicted terrorist
- Dmitri Feodorovich Trepov (1850–1906), Head of Moscow police and Governor-General of St. Petersburg
- Fyodor Trepov (disambiguation), multiple people, including:
  - Fyodor Trepov (senior) (1809–1889), Russian government official
  - Fyodor Trepov (junior) (1854–1938), Russian military and government official
