= Russian Peasants' uprising of 1905–1906 =

Widespread peasant revolts in Russia during 1905–1906

Russian Peasants' Uprising of 1905–1906
- Part of the Russian Revolution of 1905
Date	1905–1906
Location	Russian Empire
Result	Uprisings suppressed; significant destruction of manors; increased land reform pressures

Belligerents
Russian Empire	Russian peasants

Commanders and leaders
Imperial Russian Army and local authorities	Peasant rebels (no centralized leadership)

Strength
Imperial Russian Army units	Large numbers of peasants across multiple provinces

Casualties and losses
Unknown	Unknown; widespread destruction of property, including nearly 3,000 manors burned
- Included rent strikes, manor burnings, attacks on property; influenced Stolypin's land reform policies

The Russian peasants' uprising of 1905–1906, also known as the Jaquerie of 1905–1906 or the agrarian revolt of 1905–1906, was a series of peasant uprisings and violence that broke out throughout the Russian Empire in the years of 1905–1906.

== Background ==
The peasants uprising was connected to the 1905 Revolution and the October Manifesto, as the country was gripped by a revolutionary and rebellious atmosphere following Tsar Nicholas II reactionary policies. After Bloody Sunday in January, large instances of rebellion exploded throughout the country, initiating the 1905 Revolution. The revolution forced the reactionary Tsar to make concessions, and in October he issued a manifesto granting some civil liberties to prevent the nation from slipping into chaos, trying to 'pacify' the country.

== The revolt ==
The general 'mood of rebellion' riding the country quickly spread to the provinces and the countryside. Seeing the weakness of the government, they started organising rent strikes in an effort to force the landowners to pay out higher wages. They began trespassing on the land of the gentry, chopping down trees and harvesting their hay. When early summer came and it became clear that the harvest had failed, the peasants started launching large, organised attacks on the estates; they would loot the properties, and set the manor on fire, making the landowner flee. The uprising was mainly caused by the peasants misunderstanding the October Manifesto as a license to seize the countryside from the gentry: despite some rural unrest in the spring of 1905, and more in the summer, the unrest only 'exploded' after October 17.

Several witnesses noted how the night sky was illuminated by the amount of burning manors, and how long lines of peasant carts drawn by horses filled the roads, packed with stolen items. In the violence there was also much 'culture smashing', and peasants went out to destroy anything that 'smacked of superfluous wealth': setting fire to libraries, smashing antiques and dumping faeces on the expensive oriental carpets all took place. Some also seized the expensive works of art, the fine china, and the luxurious clothes and divided it amongst themselves along with the captured farming equipment. There was also a reported case of a group of peasants breaking apart a grand piano, sharing out the ivory keys.

Most violence occurred in the so-called 'Central Agricultural Zone', location of the largest estates and the poorest peasants. Much violence also occurred in the Baltic region, with the least violence happening in the West and South. Those most prone to become involved were young villagers and soldiers returning from the Far East. The largest destruction took place in Saratov Governorate, where more destruction of manors took place than anywhere else in the country. Once landowners had been driven out, the peasants returned to their communes, refusing to pay tax or obey government law, as well as driving out local officials and conservative priests.

Despite the large-scale destruction there were only one confirmed account of a landowner being killed, although it is also reported that 50 non-communal peasants who were particularly disliked were murdered. The main aim of the uprisings were however only to deprive the squires and non-peasant landowners of the opportunity to make money of the countryside, and a saying was that the peasants were just 'smoking them out'. One observer noted how the violence were almost purely directed towards the property and not the owners, saying that 'the peasants had no use whatever for landlords, but needed the land'.

During this 'Great Fear of 1905', many landowners seemed open to accepting expropriation and concessions to save themselves. Trepov had once even said to Sergey Witte: 'I myself am a landowner and I would be glad to relinquish half of my land if I were convinced that under these conditions I could keep the remainder.' However, as the revolutionary mood died down, the landowners became less willing to compromise.

The army was called to put down the disorder, but the vast majority of the Imperial Russian Army's private soldiers were peasants, and the soldiers' morale was severely impacted by news received from their own villages. As the army was called out to put down the peasant uprisings' of 1905–1906, many units — especially in the infantry, which consisted mainly of peasants — refused to obey orders and mutinied in favor of the Revolution; between autumn of 1905 and winter of 1906 over 400 mutinies took place, causing the army to be brought to the brink of collapse. It took several years to restore something close to order.

== Aftermath and reaction ==
Almost 3000 manors were destroyed by the 'Jaquerie of 1905-06', 15 percent of the country total. In some areas, the revolt was accompanied by pogroms against Jews.

What followed the uprisings was a wave of 'gentry reaction'. Organisations like the United Nobility was formed to protect the gentry's properties, and the provincial zemstvos changed nature from being 'liberal strongholds' to 'bastions of law and order'.

With the most destruction finding place in Saratov, Stolypin's daughter wrote of how 'the steppe lit up at night by the burning manor houses' and how the long lines of peasants and carts moving across the red horizon looked like 'a peasant army coming home from its wars'. It played an important role in convincing Governor of Saratov, Stolypin, that a land reform was necessary.

== See also ==
- All-Russian Peasant Union

== Bibliography ==
- Figes, Orlando (2014). A People's Tragedy: The Russian Revolution 1891–1924. London: The Bodley Head. ISBN 9781847922915.
- Pipes, Richard (1991). The Russian Revolution. New York: Vintage Books. ISBN 9780307788573.
