= E. gobiensis =

E. gobiensis may refer to:

- Entelodon gobiensis, an extinct mammal species
- Eptesicus gobiensis, the Gobi big brown bat, a bat species found in Afghanistan, China, India, Mongolia, Pakistan and Russia

== See also ==
- Gobiensis
