= Homestead Dolgorukovy — Bobrinsky =

- Усадьба Долгоруковых — Бобринских
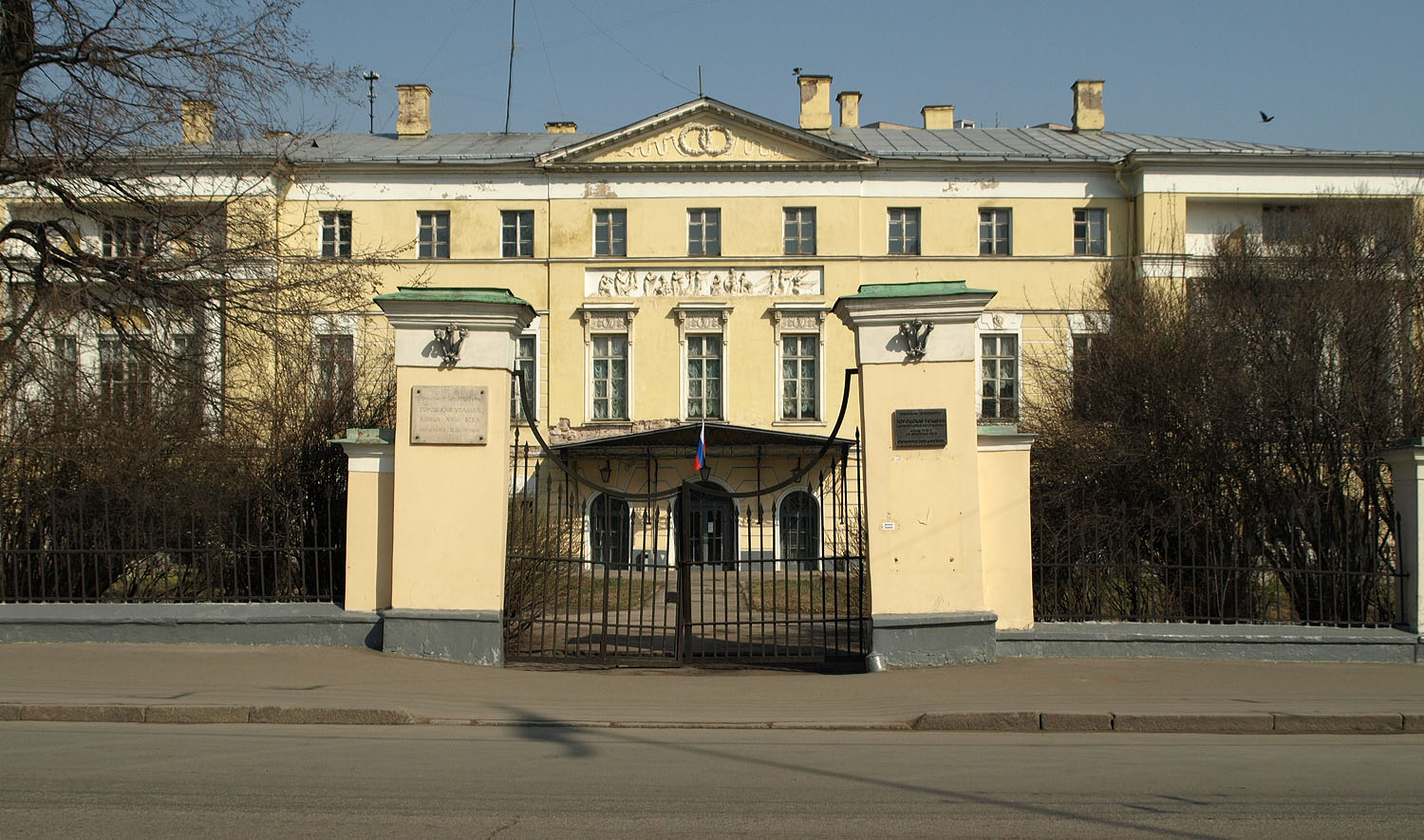
- Location: Moscow, Malaya Nikitskaya street, house 12
- Coordinates: 55°45′31″N 37°35′37″E

The Homestead Dolgorukovy — Bobrinsky (Russian: Усадьба Долгоруковых — Бобринских) is a city manor in Moscow (Malaya Nikitskaya Street, 12). Built at the end of the 18th century. Belonged to the princes Dolgorukov and Count Bobrinsky. The estate has the status of an object of cultural heritage of federal significance.

== History ==
The manor complex was built in the late 18th century by Prince Andrey Nikolaevich Dolgorukov on the basis of the Chambers. Later, the owner of the house became the councilor-in-arms Prokopii Fedorovich Sokovnin (1786-1819). Then the house was inherited by his daughter Sofya Prokopievna Sokovnina (1812-1869). In 1830, she married Count Vasily Alekseevich Bobrinsky (1804-1874), and the estate was given to him as a dowry. Later, the estate was inherited by their son, the Moscow provincial leader of the nobility and a member of the State Council, Alexei Vasilievich Bobrinsky (1831-1888). His son, ethnographer Alexei Alekseyevich Bobrinsky (1861-1938), became the last owner of the estate.

At the end of the 19th century - beginning of the twentieth century, the main house was leased to the gymnasium of A.V. Adolf. In the Soviet era, the estate buildings were occupied by various institutions. In 2010 the estate was transferred to the Presidential Center of Boris N. Yeltsin. After carrying out restoration works, it is planned to place the museum-exhibition complex, library and restaurant.

== Architecture ==
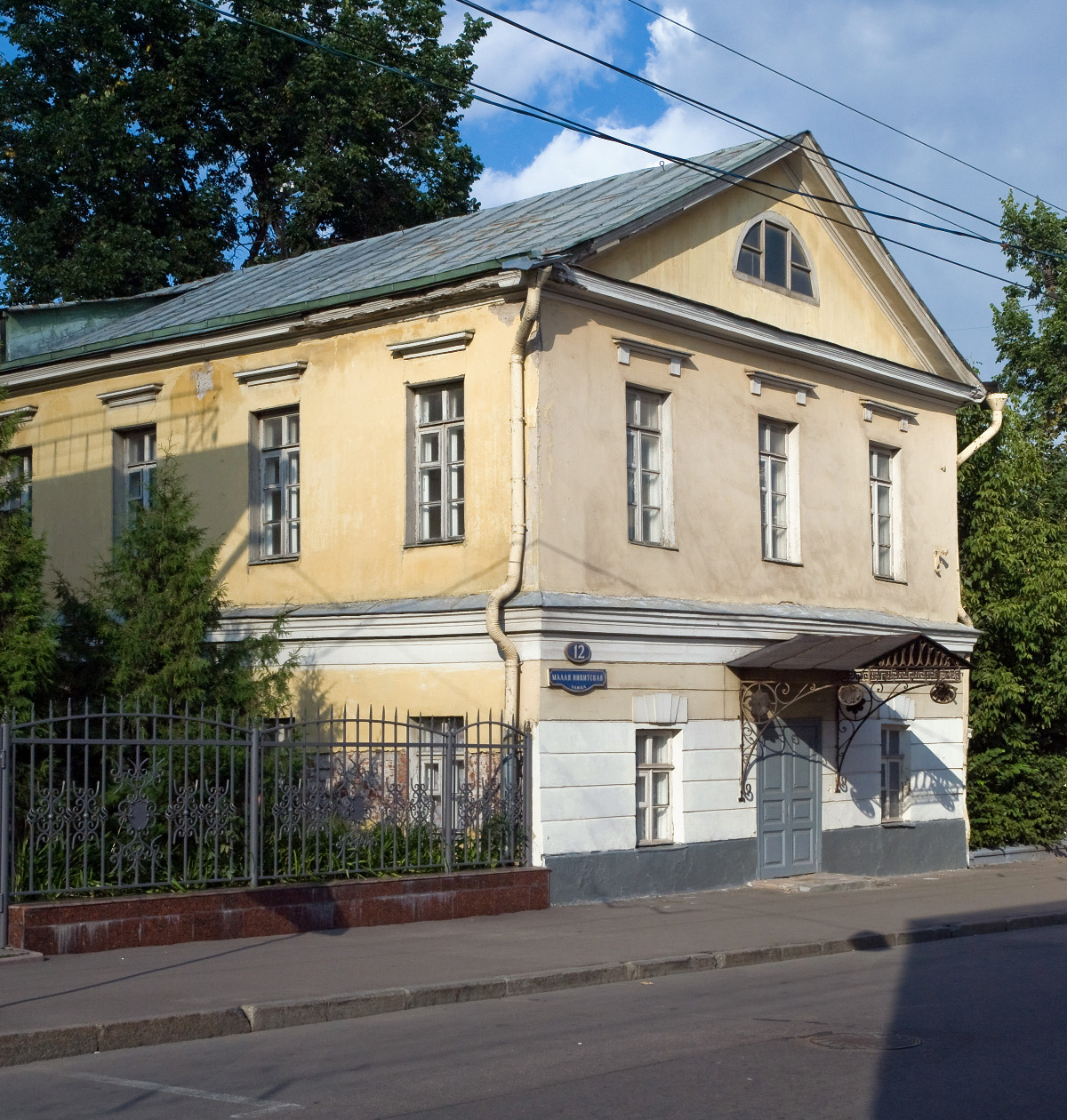
Left wing

The manor complex includes a three-story main house and two-story side wings facing the red line of Malaya Nikitskaya Street. The front yard is separated from the street by a light forged fence with a gate on the main axis. The wings are connected to the main house by concave one-storey decorative walls with travel arches, through which one can get to the farmyard overlooking Granatny Pereulok. There is a coach house.

The central part of the main house is marked with a risalite, crowned with a small triangular pediment with garlands. The first and second floors of the house are decorated with rust. The planks of the second floor are decorated with stucco and mascarons. Above the three central windows of the second floor - a relief panel with an antique story. Above the three arches of the front entrance is a forged umbrella with lanterns, size and shape almost identical to the pediment. The side rasalitas of the main house are decorated with loggias with columns of the Corinthian order and arched niches. The concave walls that connect the main house with the wings are decorated with semi-columns, arched niches and are crowned with a balustrade. Marble statues of the 18th century "Paris" and "Elena" (they were moved here in 1947 from the collection of the Museum of Architecture) were installed in the courtyard.

Preserved interiors and the original layout of the estate. The halls are decorated with ample polychrome picturesque shades with stucco moldings. There are also stoves and fireplaces, doors, chandeliers, parquet flooring.
