= Fyodor Trepov =

Fyodor Trepov may refer to:

- Fyodor Trepov (senior) (1809–1889), Russian government official
- Fyodor Trepov (junior) (1854–1938), Russian military and government figure, son of the government official
