= Bobrinsky Palace =

- дворца Бобринских
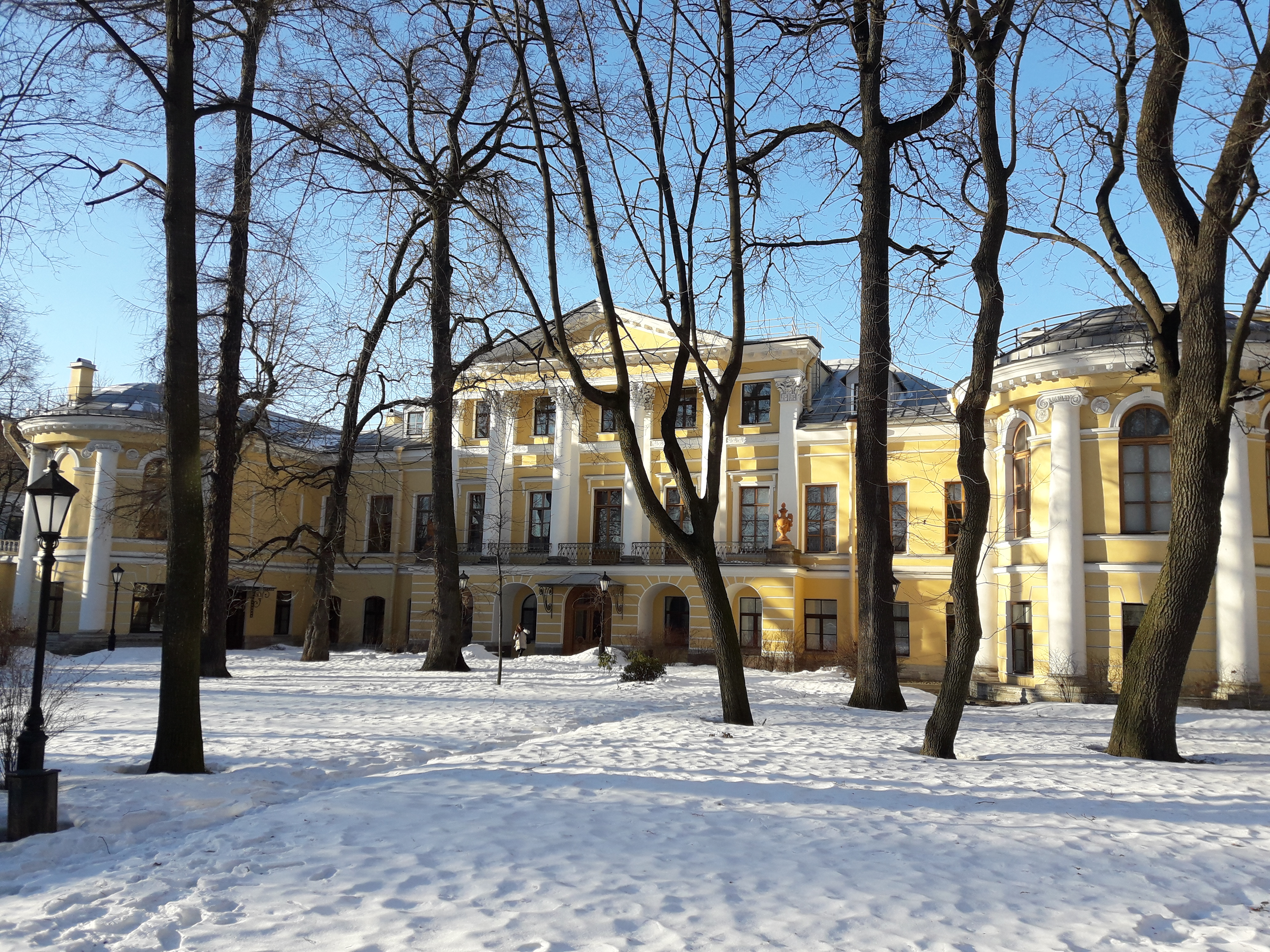
- The garden facade
- Interactive map of the Bobrinsky Palace area

General information
- Location: Saint Petersburg, Russia, St. Petersburg, ul. Galernaya, 58–60
- Coordinates: 59°55′48″N 30°17′06″E
- Client: Alexander Khrapovitsky
- Owner: St. Petersburg State University

Renovating team
- Architect: Luigi Rusca

The Bobrinsky Palace is a historic building in Saint Petersburg, Russia. It is located between Galernaya ulitsa, Novo-Admiralteysky Canal, and Admiralteysky Canal, and is a monument of architecture in the style of classicism.

== Construction ==
The first owner of the estate in the second half of the 18th century was the cabinet secretary of Catherine II, Alexander Khrapovitsky. In 1790 the building was bought by the senator Peter Myatlev.

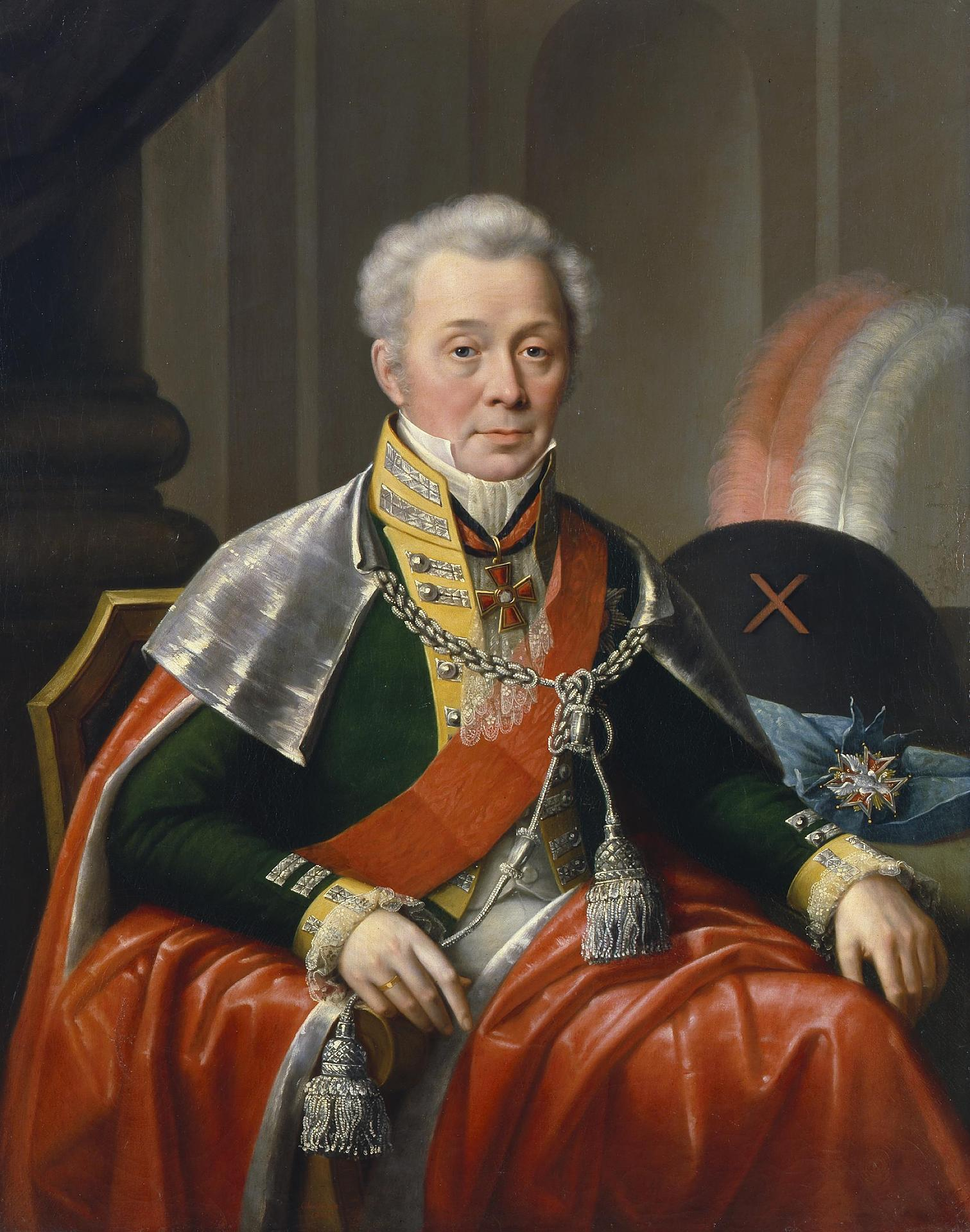
Senator Peter Myatlev

A Swiss-Italian architect Luigi Rusca expanded and rebuilt the house for him in the classical style. It was the first independent work of the future famous master. During the reconstruction, which was carried out in 1792–1796, the complex of the estate was merged with another building, which was located on a neighboring plot—the former house of the architect Savva Chevakinsky. In 1798, for a short time the palace was owned by Prince Platon Zubov, who had purchased it from Myatlev. Quite soon it was acquired from him by the wife of Paul I—Empress Maria Feodorovna.

== The palace in the possession of the Counts Bobrinsky ==
The further history of the palace is connected with the family of Counts Bobrinskys. In the 19th and early 20th century, many representatives of this family held high positions in the state hierarchy and at the court, were engaged in scientific and social activities. The Bobrinskys were among the major landowners and property owners of Russia. In 1897, the total value of land, real estate, financial assets of the Bobrinsky family was 17.5 million rubles (several billion rubles in 2019 prices). However, this wealth was jointly owned by the members of the family. Although the personal wealth of quite numerous individual family members could not be compared to the wealth of the richest Russian aristocrats (princely couple of the Yusupovs or Prince S. Abamelek-Lazarev), the Bobrinskys undoubtedly belonged to the most influential Russian families. The proximity of the family to the reigning house, their marriages with representatives of other noble families, the participation in court and public life, along with the accumulated wealth ensured Bobrinskys’ prominent place in the narrow (several dozen families) circle of the supreme Russian aristocracy. The status of the family was reflected in the status of their St. Petersburg home—the Bobrinsky Palace. For more than a century, it was one of the centers of social and political life of the capital.

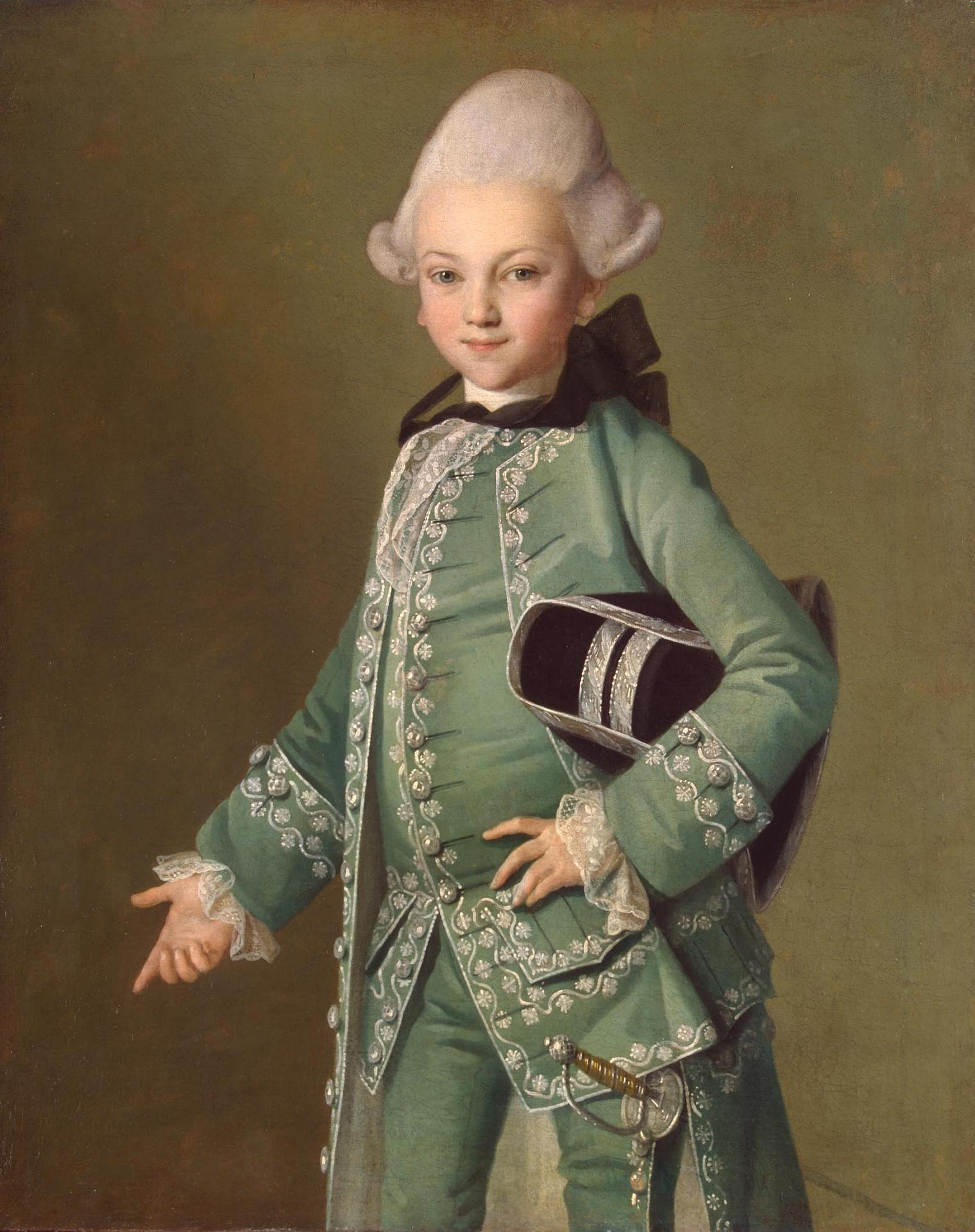
Alexey Grigorievich Bobrinsky

In 1798, Alexei Grigorievich Bobrinsky, the illegitimate son of Catherine the Great and Grigory Orlov, became the first owner of the estate. In 1796 he was created a count by his half-brother Emperor Paul I. The estate on Galernaya Street was presented to him as a gift by the Empress Maria Feodorovna. Soon after that, having left military service, A. G. Bobrinsky left for his Bogoroditsk manor near Tula where spent almost all his time, only occasionally visiting St. Petersburg. After the death of her husband in 1813, Countess Anna Vladimirovna Bobrinskaya continued to raise children in Bogoroditsk, spending winter in her house in Moscow. In the 1820s, the family settled in the St. Petersburg Palace, which was then expanded and re-decorated. In the 1830s, the palace hosted multiple receptions, balls, salons, amateur performances, masquerades, and soirees.

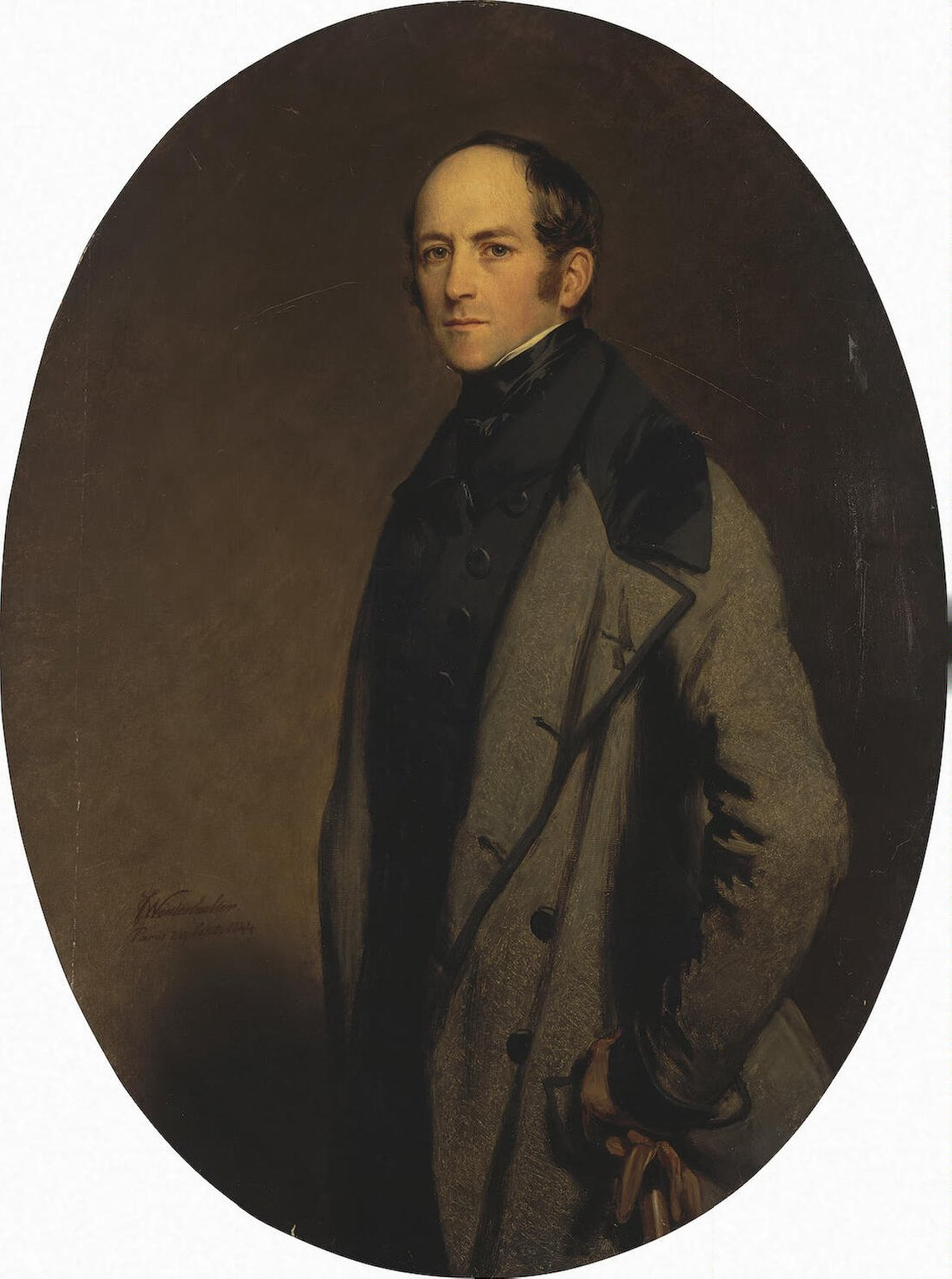
Alexey Alexeyevich Bobrinsky

The eldest son of Alexey Grigorievich, Count Alexey Alexeyevich Bobrinsky, and his wife, Sophia Alexandrovna Bobrinskaya, continued the traditions of the house. The palace was repeatedly visited by Emperor Nicholas I and Empress Alexandra Feodorovna. The salon of the junior Countess Bobrinskaya was frequented by the literati P. A. Vyazemsky, V. Zhukovskysky, the brothers Vielgorskys, as well by the imperial chancellor Prince A.M. Gorchakov.

Alexander Pushkin, also regularly visited the palace. In his diary for 1833–35 it is mentioned that he visited Bobrinskys' dinners (in particular during this period—on December 6, 1833, and on February 28, 1834). On January 17, 1834, he was at a ball in the palace and left the following record: “A ball at the Count Bobrinsky’s – one of the most brilliant”. Count Alexey Alexeyevich Bobrinsky was one of the founders of the joint-stock company for the construction of Russia's first railway. In 1835, in order to raise additional funds for the company and to convince those who doubted the technical capabilities of the railway, he built a section of the railway in the garden of the palace, on which a trolley loaded with stones was moving. The Count was also one of the first Russian photographers. Portraits of the Count's family members made by daguerreotype in 1842–43 are among the earliest Russian daguerreotype portraits. Some of them were made in St. Petersburg, and likely in the palace. These daguerreotypes were part of the photo collection of the Counts Bobrinskys, now they are in the collection of the State Hermitage Museum. From 1856 and up until his death in 1868, the Count lived in the estate of Smela near Kiev.

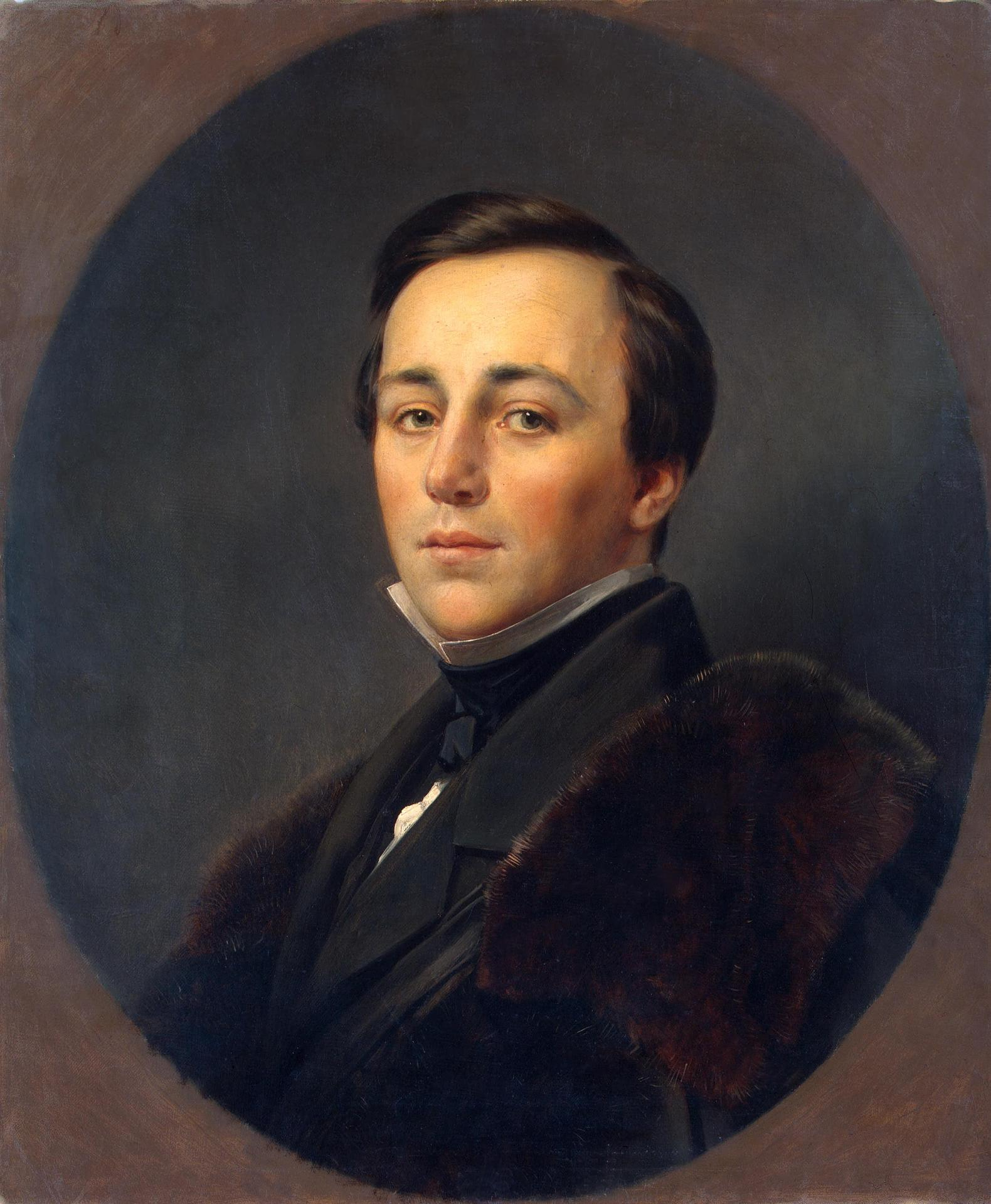
Alexander Alexeyevich Bobrinsky

The role of the palace as one of the centers of the social life of St. Petersburg was maintained by the next representative of the family Count Alexander Alexeyevich Bobrinsky. He held the position of St. Petersburg governor in 1861–64, in the years 1869–72 was the provincial leader of the nobility, and since 1858 held various positions at the imperial court.

In the second half of the 19th century, the collection of paintings, weapons and books in the Bobrinsky Palace was open to the public. A memorial room of Count G. G. Orlov was created in the palace.

The last owner (since 1903) of the estate from the Bobrinsky family—Count Alexey Alexandrovich Bobrinsky. He was a historian, an archaeologist, and a statesman.

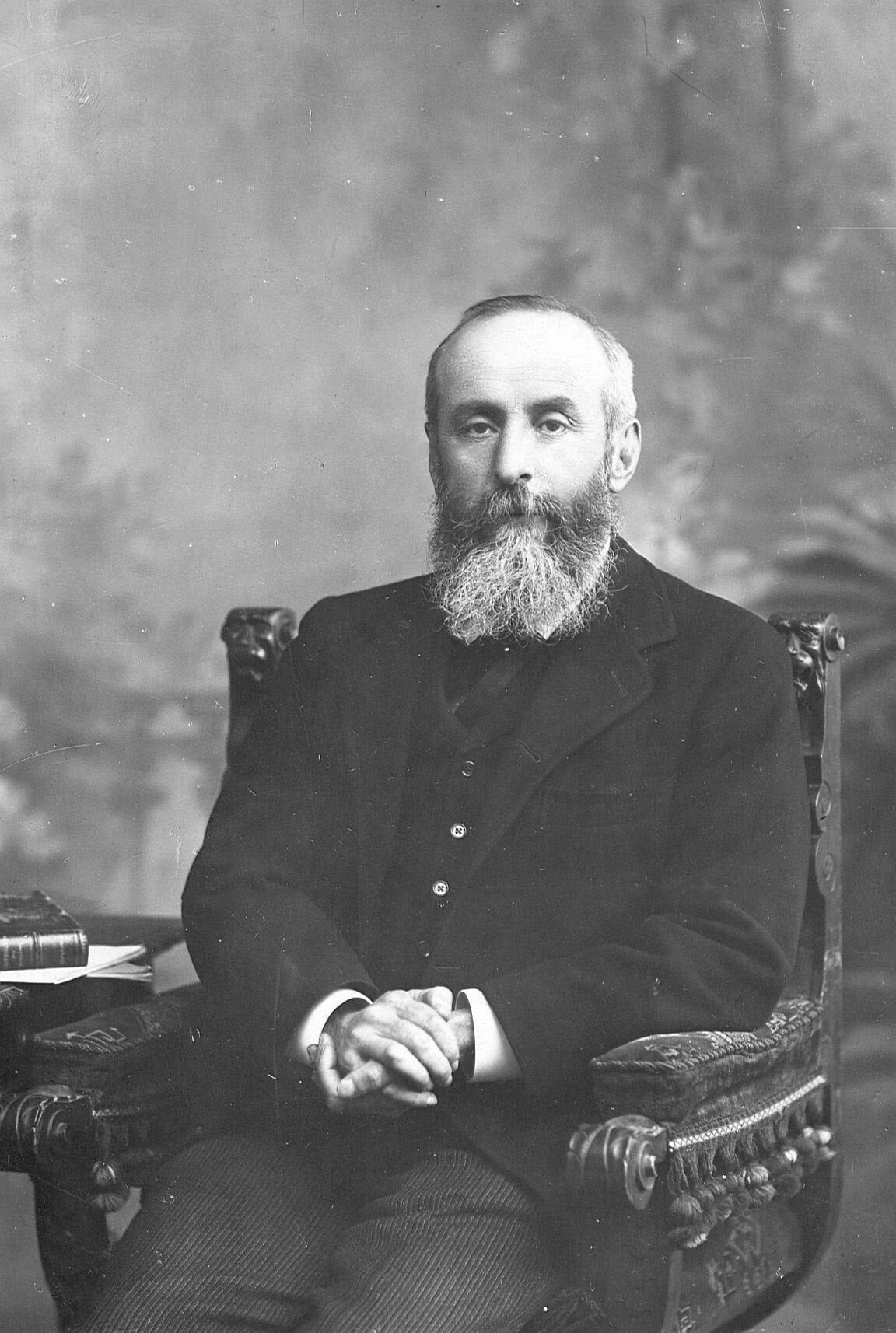
Alexey Alexandrovich Bobrinsky

In 1905, Count Alexei Alexandrovich Bobrinsky was elected the chairman of the National Union, a political association (which, however, did not last long), the key principles of which were "autocracy, consultative Zemsky Sobor, the fight against constitutionalism". The union consisted of about 350 people (representatives of the highest bureaucracy, generals, nobility, including 8 senators, 15 generals, 41 nobility leaders, 35 representatives of the titled nobility). The meetings of members of the National Union were held at the Bobrinsky Palace.

One of the members of the union, V. I. Gurko, wrote:

I recall vividly the meeting of the Union in Galernaya Street, in the cozy mansion of Count A. A. Bobrinsky. In a comparatively small room, covered with a soft carpet and lined with cabinets filled with countless archaeological objects obtained from the excavations carried out by the Count, at an oblong table, with the light of several candelabra softened by pink shades, the founders of the Union gathered and seriously discussed issues they could not influence. There was, however, a work of thought, views of the participants were clarified, and at the same time the disagreement between them, which later was to distribute them to different political groups, conservative in general, but quite different in essence.

After the establishment of the State Duma in the Russian Empire, Count A. A. Bobrinsky made several attempts to become a deputy of the Duma. He managed to become a member of the third Duma in 1907. In 1912, in connection with his appointment to the State Council, he left the Duma. A supporter of the right-wing parties and a monarchist, Count A. A. Bobrinsky undertook a number of steps aimed at bringing together conservatives in the State Council and the Duma. During those years, balls and social meetings at the palace gave way to both closed meetings of politicians of the right wing, and to regular political routs, attended by numerous invited guests.

For instance, on November 6, 1911 (a few days before hearings in the State Council about the law on transition from one religion to another), the palace hosted a rout, which was attended by more than 100 people (members of the State Council and the State Duma, senior clergymen, scholars etc.). The meeting was devoted to the discussion about the freedom of the Russian Church. The report on the need of the official state recognition of the right not to belong to any religious confession, was delivered by famous Church publicist and lawyer Nikolai Dmitrievich Kuznetsov. According to Kuznetsov, the report caused almost a storm in the right parties and in the Church. Unlike balls and salons of the 19th century, political discussions of the 1910s in the palace were visited not only by the aristocracy, but also by representatives of other social strata, who in the recent past had almost no chance to be invited as guests to the palaces of the aristocracy.

In 1911, a banquet was held at the palace in honor of the election of Count A.A. Bobrinsky the chairman of the supervisory board of the Russian-English Bank. In his speech, the count expressed the hope that by placing capital in Russian industrial enterprises, the British "will develop them to the appropriate size and, on the one hand, contributing to the prosperity of both countries, on the other hand, will contribute to the friendly rapprochement of the two great empires".

With the beginning of the World War I, Count A. A. Bobrinsky allowed using the palace facilities for the infirmary of the red cross. During the revolution of 1917, a part of the palace was occupied and used as barracks by revolutionary battalions (female and Latvian), while another part of the building continued to be used as an infirmary. After the revolution, the banking accounts of the count were arrested. He had no money for the maintenance of the building. Although the provisional government, headed by Kerensky, promised to appoint a pension to the count as to a former member of the State Council, the revolution of October 1917 put an end to these hopes. A. A. Bobrinsky in early 1918 attempted to achieve an agreement with the Bolsheviks about the appointment of a pension and a compensation for the cost of maintaining the infirmary, but with no success.

After the events of October 1917, private palaces of Petrograd were under serious threat. In the post-revolutionary chaos and amidst food shortages, rumors (often exaggerated) about the treasures hidden in the palaces of the nobility, as well as about the contents of their wine cellars, fueled the interest of gangs of rioters and robbers. In the summer of 1918, on August 1, several palaces, including the palace of A. A. Bobrinsky on Galernaya Street, were nationalized, which saved them from complete looting. After the decree on the nationalization was issued, A. A. Bobrinsky moved to the south of Russia, then to Kiev. He moved to Constantinople in 1920 and to France in 1921, where he lived until death in 1927. The collection of paintings, artefacts and furniture from the palace were distributed among museums.

== The palace during the Soviet period ==
In the 1920s, the building housed a department of the Russian Museum. In 1925, the palace hosted an exhibition "Merchant Portraits of the Eighteenth to Twentieth Centuries" with a partial "reconstruction" of historical and typological interiors.

After 1929 the building housed the Central Geographical Museum, created by V. P. Semenov-Tianshansky. The museum organized thematic exhibitions, visited by tens of thousands of people. All schoolchildren of Leningrad and a lot of foreign tourists passed through the museum. With the departure of Semenov-Tianshansky from the position of the museum head, the museum's decay began. Eventually the museum was transferred to Leningrad University. At the beginning of 1941, by a decree of Leningrad City Council the museum was closed down

Then the palace became home to the Faculty of Geography of Leningrad State University, and from 1960s—to the Institute of Complex Social Research (NIKSI), as well as the psychological faculty of Leningrad State University. No complex restoration of the palace was carried in the Soviet years, so the premises (including the palace halls) gradually fell into decay.

== The palace today ==
On December 13, 2001, the Bobrinsky Palace was transferred to St. Petersburg State University. In 2003, urgent repair and restoration works began, as in several rooms there was a threat of collapse of the walls. The restoration lasted for about eight years. The grand opening of the Bobrinsky Palace after the restoration took place on August 31, 2011. Currently the palace is the home of the Faculty of Liberal Arts and Sciences of St. Petersburg State University.

== Architecture ==
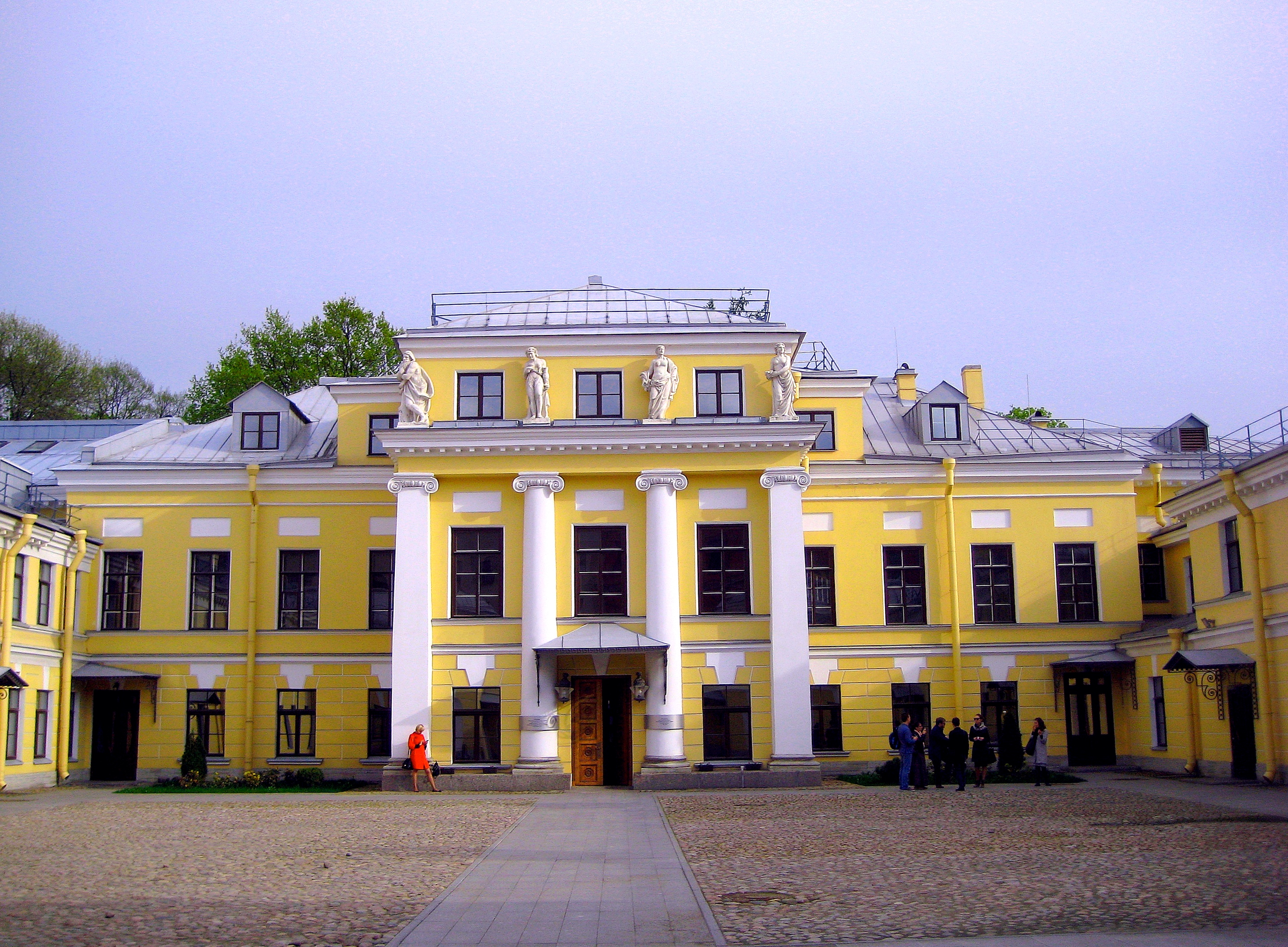
The façade from the yard

The estate's plan is typical for the urban estate of the late 18th century. The complex is formed by three interconnected buildings, the main house is located in the depth of the plot. From 1846 to 1850, the palace was partially rebuilt by the architect Garald Andreyevich Bosse. The main façade of the palace overlooks the courtyard, which is surrounded by low-rise wings and a fence with a gate. The wings around the courtyard were built in 1883.

The central building of the complex is distinguished by rich decoration of the main and garden façades. Its middle part is marked with a portico decorated with four Ionic columns; the portico unites the first and the second floors. The columns are topped with marble statues standing on the entablature and embodying the seasons. The statues were made by an unknown Italian sculptor in the first half of the 18th century. Between the second and the third floors there is a strongly protruding cornice. The main entrance to the palace is from the Galernaya Street. The entrance to the yard is decorated with monumental gates with busts on the pylons. Only the central risalit of the building is visible through the narrow openings of the entrance gate.

The garden façade facing the Admiralteysky Canal is enlivened with rounded protruding sides and a Corinthian order portico. The garden is separated from the embankments by a stone rustic fence (along the embankment of the Novo-Admiralteysky Canal) and a through lattice (along the Admiralteysky Canal, early 19th century). At the junction of the fences at the southern end of the garden, opposite the Khrapovitsky Bridge, there is a small two-storey pavilion (its author is also Luigi Ruska), crowned with a low dome. Its façades along the perimeter are decorated with arched windows. The design of the pavilion is complemented by balconies on the second floor and a descent into the garden from the inside. The stone fence is decorated with copies of ancient busts (the end of the 18th century, recreated in the 1970s).

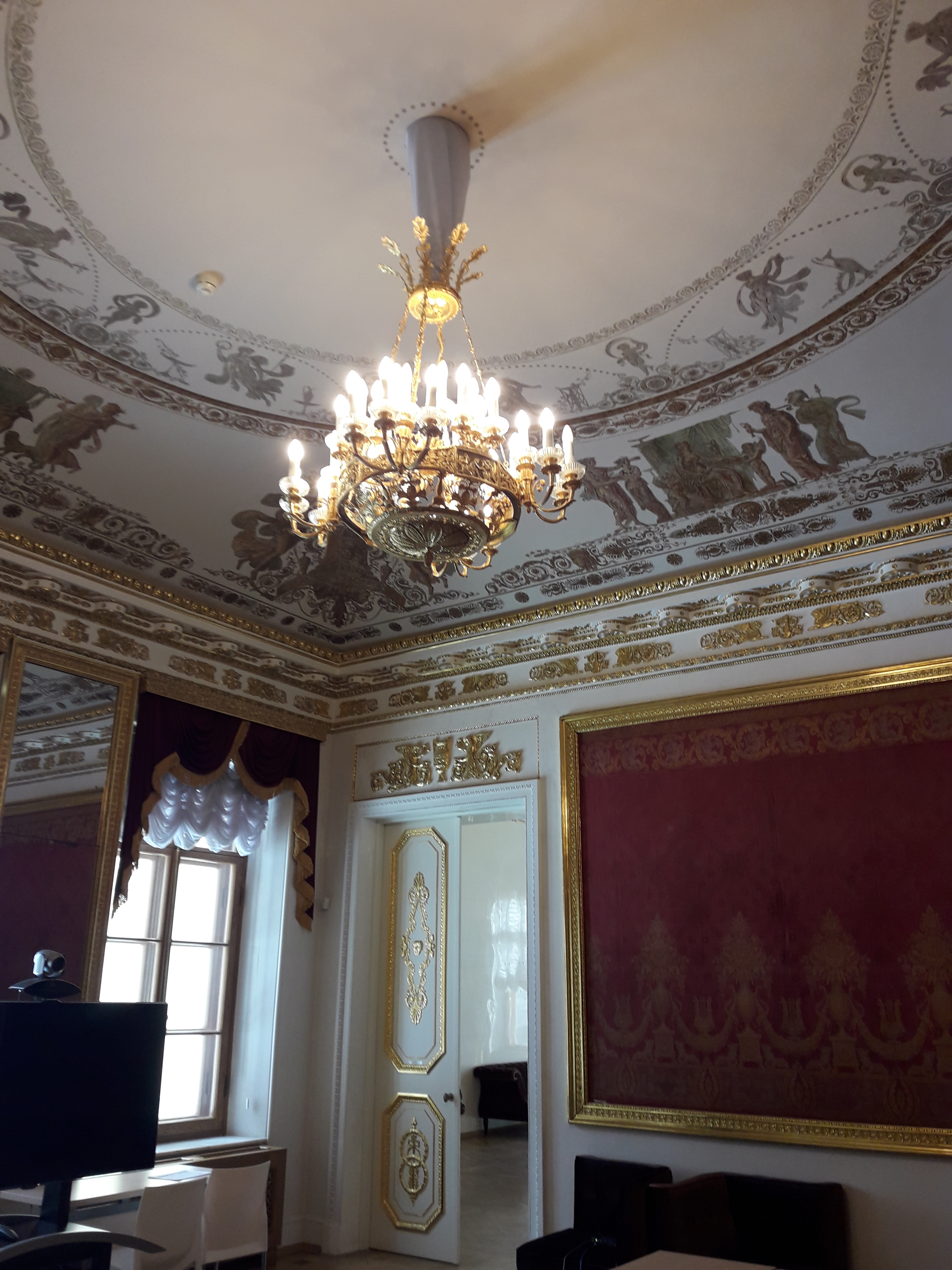
Crimson drawing room

== Interiors ==
The interior of the palace was rebuilt from 1822 to 1825 by the architect Andrey Alekseevich Mikhailov the 2nd. He created a suite of rooms on the garden side. The surviving ceiling paintings of the White Hall and of the Dance Hall were supposedly executed by the painter Giovanni Batista Scotti. To date, the interiors of 15 rooms have been partially or entirely preserved. These include the suite of rooms (Crimson Drawing Room, Blue Drawing Room, White Hall, Dance Hall, etc.), overlooking the garden. The decoration of the interiors is done in the Empire style.
