= Bobrinski's serotine =

Conservation status
- Data Deficient (IUCN 3.1)

Scientific classification
- Kingdom: Animalia
- Phylum: Chordata
- Class: Mammalia
- Order: Chiroptera
- Family: Vespertilionidae
- Genus: Eptesicus
- Species: E. bobrinskoi

Binomial name
- Eptesicus bobrinskoi Kuzyakin, 1935

Species of bat

Bobrinski's serotine (Eptesicus bobrinskoi) is a species of vesper bat. It can be found in Iran and Kazakhstan.

== Taxonomy ==
Bobrinski's serotine was described as a new species in 1935 by Alexander Petrovitch Kuzyakin (also spelled Kuzjakin). The holotype had been collected in 1928 by S. P. Naumov in Central Kazakhstan. The eponym for the species name bobrinskoi was Russian zoologist Nikolay Alekseyevich Bobrinski.

As of 2006, it was the only species of bat that had been newly described from Kazakhstan. Like all other small-bodied Eptesicus species, it was once placed in the subgenus Amblyotus, whose valid status is now doubted. Genetic data shows that it is closely related to the Gobi big brown bat, and that Bobrinski's serotine may not be a separate species. Instead, it is likely a subspecies of the Gobi big brown bat.

== Description ==
It is considered a small-bodied member of its genus. It has forearm lengths of around 34–37 mm (1.3–1.5 in). Its greatest length of skull is around 15 mm (0.59 in).

== Range and habitat ==
For several decades after its discovery, it was believed that Bobrinski's serotine was endemic to Kazakhstan. In 2006, it was additionally identified in Iran. It is found in desert habitats.
