= Dmytro Doroshenko =

Ukrainian historian and politician (1882–1951)

- Дмитро Дорошенко
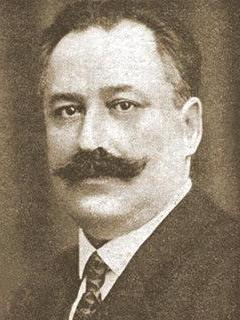
- Doroshenko in 1936

Minister of Foreign Affairs of Ukraine
- In office 20 May 1918 – 24 October 1918
- Monarch: Pavlo Skoropadskyi
- Prime Minister: Fedir Lyzohub
- Preceded by: Mykola Vasylenko
- Succeeded by: Georgiy Afanasyev

Governor of Chernihiv Governorate
- In office August 1917 – January 1918
- Preceded by: Mykola Kulyabko-Koretskyi
- Succeeded by: Chernihiv Revkom

Krai Commissar of Galicia and Bukovina General Government
- In office 22 April 1917 – 2 August 1917
- Preceded by: Fyodor Trepov (as Governor General)
- Succeeded by: position abolished

Personal details
- Born: 8 April 1882 Vilna, Russian Empire (now Vilnius, Lithuania)
- Died: 19 March 1951 (aged 68) Munich, West Germany
- Party: Socialist Federalists
- Occupation: Historian
- Known for: see § Major works

Dmytro Ivanovych Doroshenko (Ukrainian: Дмитро Іванович Дорошенко; 8 April 1882 – 19 March 1951) was a prominent Ukrainian political figure during the revolution of 1917–1918 and a leading Ukrainian emigre historian during the inter-war period. Doroshenko was a supporter of federal ties with the Russian Republic and a member of the Ukrainian Party of Socialist Federalists.

== Political career ==
Doroshenko was born into an old Ukrainian Cossack noble family, which had given Ukraine two prominent hetmans during the seventeenth century. He studied history at the universities of Warsaw, Saint Petersburg, and Kiev and was active in the Ukrainian national movement during the early years of the twentieth century; he contributed articles on history and literature to Ukrainian periodicals and edited the political journal Ukrainskii vestnik (The Ukrainian Herald) which reflected the views of the Ukrainian Club in the Russian State Duma (1906). Thereafter, he became active in the Ukrainian Scientific Society in Kiev and the Prosvita educational society in Yekaterinoslav. During the war which broke out in 1914 he was active in the Union of Cities and did relief work in Russian held Galicia and Bukovyna.

During the revolution of 1917–1918, Doroshenko held several responsible positions under the radical and socialist Ukrainian Central Rada, which quickly emerged as a kind of Ukrainian national parliament, and he helped to build the autonomous Ukrainian People's Republic. However, distressed by the continuous shift to the left of the Central Rada, Doroshenko supported the conservative coup staged by General Pavlo Skoropadsky and his German military supporters and was named Foreign Minister in the new Hetmanate that was then established. He was a firm supporter of the Ukrainian national element in this regime to which many "White" Russian elements were attracted, but he also had the difficult task of reconciling various pro-Russian, pro-German, and pro-Ukrainian influences on the foreign policy of the Hetmanate. The task proved impossible and Doroshenko eventually resigned shortly before the collapse of this conservative regime.

== Emigration ==
In 1919, Doroshenko went into exile and eventually settled in Prague where the Czechoslovak government gave refuge to Ukrainian and Russian emigres, especially scholars. During the inter-war period, Doroshenko was in turn a professor of history at the Ukrainian Free University in Prague, Director of the Ukrainian Scientific Institute in Berlin, and Professor of Church History at the University of Warsaw. In 1937 and 1938, he made two highly successful lecture tours of Canada which at that time possessed a large Ukrainian immigrant population. In 1939, he returned to Prague where he continued his historical work at the Ukrainian Free University.

In 1945, Doroshenko fled to western Germany where he became the first president of the Ukrainian Free Academy of Sciences. In 1947, he moved to Canada where he taught history and literature at Saint Andrew's College in Winnipeg and together with the literary historian, Leonid Biletsky, and the philologist, Jaroslav Rudnyckyj, established a branch of the Ukrainian Free Academy of Sciences. However, he fell ill in Winnipeg and in 1950 returned to Europe. He died in Munich in early 1951.

== Historian ==
As a historian, Doroshenko represented the conservative Derzhavnyk or "statist" trend in Ukrainian historiography. On the one hand, he accepted the historical scheme of the famous Ukrainian historian, Mykhailo Hrushevsky, which saw continuity in the history of his country from Kievan Rus' to modern times and claimed the heritage of Kievan Rus' primarily for modern Ukraine, but on the other hand, he rejected Hrushevsky's stress upon the role of the common people, instead stressing the role of the educated political elite. Doroshenko was especially fond of the old Cossack officer class which evolved into the later Ukrainian gentry and he gave much space in his histories to the strivings of this elite for political autonomy and independence.

== Major works ==
Doroshenko authored a two volume Survey of Ukrainian History, a Survey of Ukrainian Historiography, biographies of several major figures of the Ukrainian national awakening of the nineteenth century, a book on German depictions of Ukraine throughout the centuries, works on the revolutionary period and the Hetman state of 1918, a major work on his relative, the seventeenth-century Cossack hetman Petro Doroshenko, booklets on church history, and two volumes of memoirs which treated the period from 1900 to 1919. His personal bibliography lists almost 1000 titles.
