= Bobrinski Bucket =

12th century bronze bucket produced in Herat, present-day Afghanistan

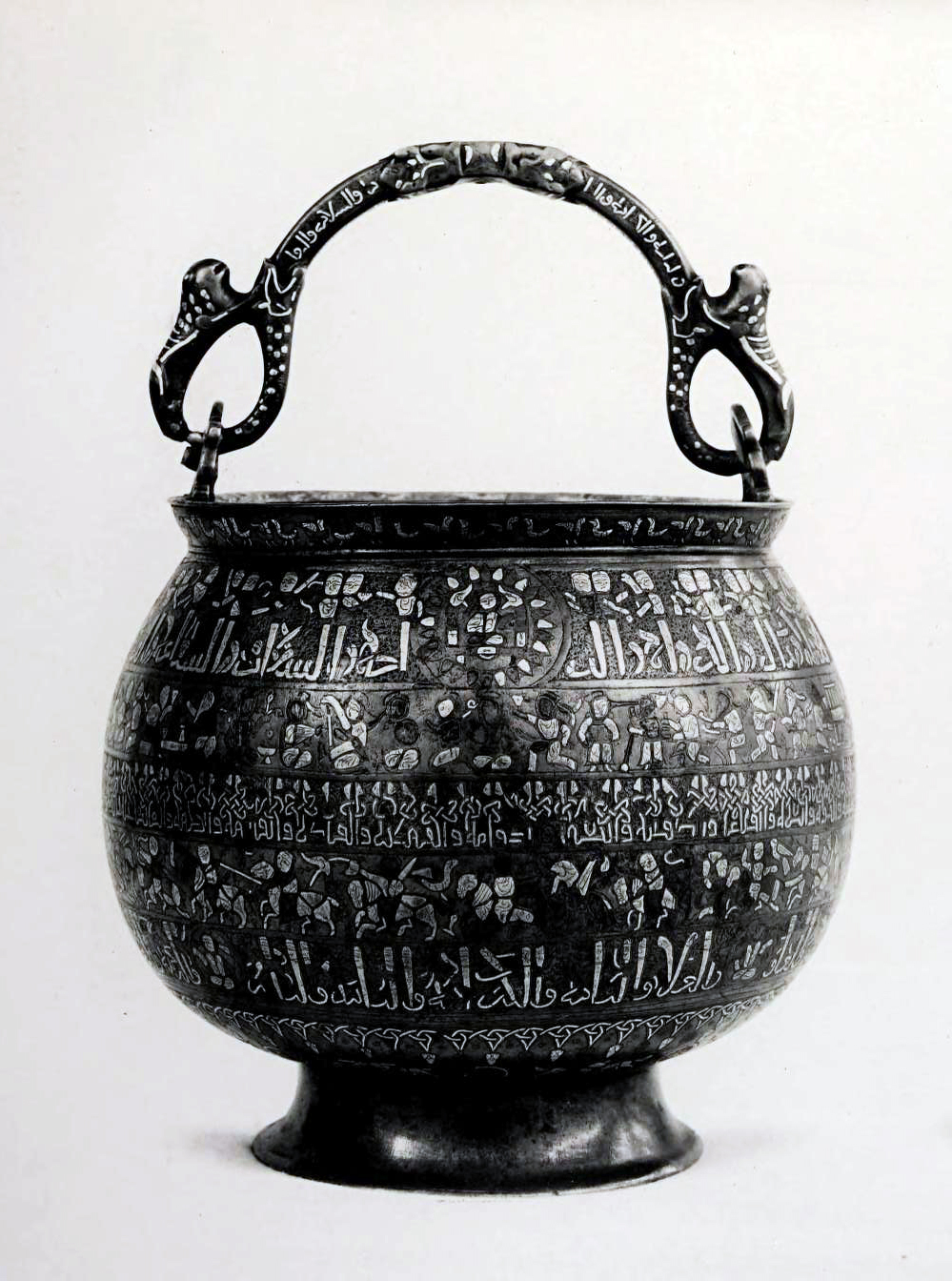
Black and white image of the Bobrinski Bucket at the Hermitage Museum.

The Bobrinski Bucket, also called the Bobrinski Kettle or Bobrinski Cauldron (also spelled Bobrinsky), is a bronze bucket produced in Herat, present-day Afghanistan in 1163 C.E. (during the month Muharram in 559 A.H). The bucket’s height is a mere 18.5 cm and consists of a rounded body with a rim and heightened base, and a handle in the shape of real and mythological creatures. The bucket is cast in bronze, with copper and silver inlaid decorations and inscriptions throughout the bucket’s handle, rim, and body. The body of the bucket features seven horizontal bands of inlaid decorations, including the rim, consisting of inscription and iconography. Discussion of the purpose of the bucket has sparked speculation among scholars of Islamic Art.

The bucket is named after its former owner, Count Aleksei Bobrinsky (1852–1927) and now resides in the Hermitage Museum in St. Petersburg, Russia. The bucket is one of the most famous and earliest pieces of Persian metalwork associated with Herat in the late 12th century and is one of the earliest examples of zoomorphic and anthropomorphic scripts.

== Production ==
The Bobrinski Bucket is a prominent example of the inlay technique developed in twelfth century Herat. The bucket’s inlaid calligraphy was created using silver and copper wire that was laid down in shallow recesses in the bronze body and hammered down until the wire was firmly inlaid. Similarly, for the spatial inlays, used in larger areas such as the human heads or bodies of animals, a silver or copper sheet was laid over an area where only the edges were trimmed back, and hammered until held well in place. The copper and silver inlays create a multicolored, polychromatic surface for the bucket.

The division of labor between the caster and decorator of the bucket follows a trend commonly observed in Persian art of the time. Allocating the designing of different elements of the metalwork to multiple people allowed artists to apply their designs to a variety of different objects, rather than only being able to create one object. This, along with the choice to use Persian and Arabic for the inscription solidifies the Bobrinski Bucket as an early and important work showcasing Herat as an important hub of production and craftsmanship, and highlights the emergence of Persian art during this period.

== Inscription ==
The bucket features three bands of calligraphy. The first band of calligraphy is in an anthropomorphic script, meaning that the letters have human features. The second band is an interlaced Kufic script with a geometric pattern. The third band consists of anthropomorphic script with the tails of the letters interlaced with running animals. Such anthropomorphic and zoomorphic scripts are commonly found in works from the twelfth century. These bands of inscription along the bucket’s body are written in Arabic. The text consists of well wishes for the owner of the bucket, as is typical for portable Islamic metalwork.

The rim of the bucket is inscribed in Persian. The inscription lists the bucket’s caster, Muhammed ibn ‘Abd al-Wāhid, and the person who applied the decorative elements to the bucket, Mas’ūd ibn Ahmad. It also describes the person who ordered the bucket, ‘Abd al Rahmān ibn ‘Abdallāh al-Rashīdi, and the person who the bucket was made for, who the inscription refers to as “the eminent hajji Rukn ad-din, the glorious of merchants, the Muslims trusted man, an ornament to the hajj and both holy places Rashid ad-Din Azizi ibn al-Husayn az-Zanjani, may his fame endure”.

A Kufic inscription on the top of the handle reveals the month and year the bucket was completed.

== Iconography ==
From the top down, starting with the handle and ending at the bottommost band, the Bobrinski bucket is filled with iconography.

1. At the top of the Bobrinski bucket’s handle are lions heads; four heads make a square on either side that connects at the very center of the handle. Connecting the handles to the rest of the bucket are hares extending towards the lions, and dragons paralleling them, also extending towards the lions.
2. Directly below the handle are pairs of ducks, one facing the other, all the way around the rim.
3. The uppermost band displays anthropomorphic script with human torsos and heads on the upward strokes. Separating the text four times throughout the band are suns with twenty-eight alternating black and white rays. Inside the suns is a human figure, sitting on a throne, with two dragon-like staffs.
4. The second band, directly below, shows people sitting or standing doing a variety of activities. Some activities include drinking, feasting, dancing, or playing games.
5. Below the third band, which exclusively displays Kufic script, is the fourth band, which displays males figures, who are mostly on horseback that are hunting and fighting. In one part of the band, several men are fighting a dragon.
6. The penultimate band features anthropomorphic script, similar to the first band. Instead of human torsos and heads, this band only includes human heads. Joining the script and heads are animals such as dogs, birds, antelope, and hares weaving throughout the words like they are in a forest.
7. Finally, the bottommost band on the bucket depicts the same animals as the previous band chasing each other along with geometric-like columns.

The images on the bucket are associated with the ideal kingship but due to their lack of visual hierarchy are actually thought to be stock images. While most of the images are stock scenes, the meaning behind the sun in the uppermost band has been discussed. According to Willy Hartner the sun’s twenty-eight rays may be a coincidence, a reference to the draconian calendar (which has twenty-seven and some months), or the twenty-eight lunar mansions.

== Purpose ==
There is much scholarly debate about the purpose and uses of the bucket. Early scholars such as Richard Ettinghausen and Ralph Harari have hypothesized that the bucket was used as a water bucket, as it exhibits similarities to one exhibited in a fifteenth century painting of a bathhouse. The bucket’s bail handle could have been helpful in a bathhouse setting. The historian Nikolay Veselovsky had asserted that the bucket was a vessel for carrying food; However, the bucket lacks tinning on the interior that would have prevented corrosion from food. Souren Melikian and Robert Hillenbrand have connected the bucket to the Hajj, suggesting that it was either a Pilgrimage accessory or marked the completion of the Hajj, based on the references to this in the bucket’s inscriptions. Others have concluded that the bucket was a gift. Ruba Kana’an’s interpretation of the bucket’s purpose is most widely accepted in present day scholarship of the Bobrinski Bucket. Kana‘an uses her extensive study of the legal writings of Muslim jurists to better understand the production and patronage of Islamic metalware. She concludes that the bucket was produced as a showpiece of new designs and images that was presented as a gift to the workshop owner.
