= General Government of Galicia and Bukovina =

1914-15 Russian military administration

General Government of Galicia and Bukovina Галицийское генерал-губернаторство
- 1914–1917
- Flag Coat of arms

- Russian Empire The General Government
- Status: Military administration
- Capital: Lvov (Lviv)
- Common languages: Ukrainian, Polish
- Ethnic groups: Ukrainians, Poles, Rusyns, Romanians, Hutsuls, Germans, Jews
- Religion: Eastern Orthodoxy (official); Catholicism
- Demonym: Galicians
- Government: Military government
- Governor
  - 5 September 1914 – 14 July 1915: Georgiy Bobrinsky
  - 4 October 1916 – 31 May 1917: Fyodor Trepov
  - 22 April 1917 – 2 August 1917: Dmytro Doroshenko
- Historical era: World War I
  - Russian victory in the Battle of Galicia: 18 September 1914
  - Gorlice–Tarnów offensive: 2 May – 22 June 1915
  - Russian retreat from Galicia: 14 July 1915
  - Abolition: 15 August 1917

Population
  - 1910: 8,025,675 (the whole Kingdom of Galicia and Lodomeria)
- Currency: Russian ruble and Austro-Hungarian krone
Preceded by	Succeeded by
Kingdom of Galicia and Lodomeria	Kingdom of Galicia and Lodomeria
- Today part of: Poland; Ukraine; Romania

The General Government of Galicia and Bukovina, also known as the Galicia Governorate-General (Russian: Галицийское генерал-губернаторство, romanized: Galitsiyskoye general-gubernatorstvo) was a temporary Russian military administration of the eastern parts of the Kingdom of Galicia and Lodomeria, which were captured from Austria-Hungary during World War I.

The administration was established after the Russian victory in the Battle of Galicia, led by the commander-in-chief Nikolai Ivanov in the late summer of 1914. It did not last long, and by mid-1915, the Russians retreated after the Gorlice–Tarnów offensive led by the Central Powers overall commander August von Mackensen. During the later stages of the war, Russian forces tried to reclaim the territory during the Brusilov and the Kerensky offensives. Although it de facto ceased to function after the Great Retreat in 1915, it was not formally abolished until 1917.

== Military governors and krai commissars ==
- 5 September 1914 – 14 July 1915: Georgiy Bobrinsky
- 4 October 1916 – 31 May 1917: Fyodor Trepov, administrator of the governments of Ternopol and Chernovtsy
- 22 April – 2 August 1917: Dmytro Doroshenko, krai commissar of the Russian Provisional Government

== Administrative divisions ==
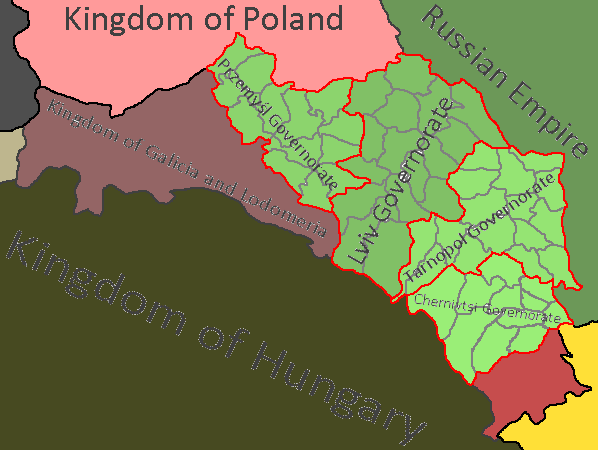
Subdivisions of the General Government

There were four governments (guberniya) that were divided into counties (uyezdy, locally - powiats):

- Lvov Governorate
- Ternopol Governorate
- Chernovtsy Governorate
- Peremyshl Governorate
