= Kashkarov =

Kashkarov (Russian: Кашкаров) is a Russian masculine surname, its feminine counterpart is Kashkarova. Notable people with the surname include:

- Igor Kashkarov (born 1933), Russian high jumper
- Juri Kashkarov (born 1963), Russian biathlete
