= United Nobility =

Russian political association (1906–1917)

United Nobility (Russian: Объединённое дворянство; Ob'yedinennoye dvoryanstvo) was a political association active in the Russian Empire from 1906 to 1917. The organisation consisted of the Russian nobility and gentry. United Nobility was one of several landowners' organisations which were established in the wake of the Russian Peasants' uprising of 1905–1906, and the largest estates joined these groups as a part of a larger "gentry reaction" to the violence directed towards Russian squires. Its leader was Count Aleksei Bobrinsky, brother-in-law of later Prime Minister Georgy Lvov. It was established to defend the property rights and the domination in local politics of the gentry.

The organisation had a strong presence in the State Council, with one third of all seats being held by a member, and prevented the passing of liberal reforms from the Duma. It had powerful supporters in the State Council, the Civil Service and the Tsar's court. The organisation led a campaign against the liberal reform proposals of the Duma. After 1905 it became the 'firmest pillar of autocracy'.

== Background ==
During the Russian Peasants' uprising of 1905–1906 a large wave of peasant violence directed at the provincial squires and landlords erupted. This resulted in a change in the political leanings of the provincial squires, who had been avid supporters of liberal reform in 1904–1905, who now became (mainly) passive or inactive reactionaries. Many were also scared off their estates, and between 1906 and 1914 one-fifth of all gentry land were sold to peasants, with the portion nearing one-third in the most rebellious areas of 1905–1906. Those who remained, the majority, there was a 'hardening resolution to defend their property rights', and these landowners started loud calls for a restoration of law and order in the provinces and countryside. This coincided with a change in the nature of the zemstvos, who previously had been liberal organisations, and now became 'pillars of conservatism', and from being focused on the improvement of the peasantry's condition, they now became preoccupied with the most narrow concerns of the gentry. The largest estates and landowners joined the United Nobility, led by Count Aleksei Bobrinsky, and now established to defend the property rights of the gentry, and their domination in local politics. His brother-in-law Prince Georgy Lvov was voted off the Tula zemstvo in the winter of 1905–1906, with Bobrinsky condemning him as a 'dangerous liberal'.

One third of the members of the State Council, a consultative assembly of nobles, belonged to the United Nobility, and helped to bar any passing of liberal reforms from the Duma. It had powerful supporters in the Tsar's court, the State Council and the Civil Service, and it led a campaign against the liberal reform proposals of the Duma on 'the grounds that granting additional land to the peasants would not help solve their problems, since these were caused by the inefficiency of the communal system and not by the shortage of land.'

The United Nobility were the 'most vociferous' of the groups against Stolypin's reforms, as his local government reforms threatened their domination in local politics by giving peasants as landowners equal representation in the zemstvos. They subsequently were one of the groups accusing Stolypin of attempting of 'undermine "provincial society" (which meant themselves) through bureaucratic centralisation'.

The Petrograd and Moscow branches of the United Nobility were some of those who urged the Tsar to let the Duma elect a government in November 1916, as by this time even they – 'since 1905 the firmest pillar of autocracy' – had recognised the need of fundamental changes of government.

== Bibliography ==
- Figes, Orlando (2014). A People's Tragedy: The Russian Revolution 1891–1924. London: The Bodley Head. ISBN 9781847922915.
