= Georgiy Bobrinsky =

Imperial Russian general (1863–1928)

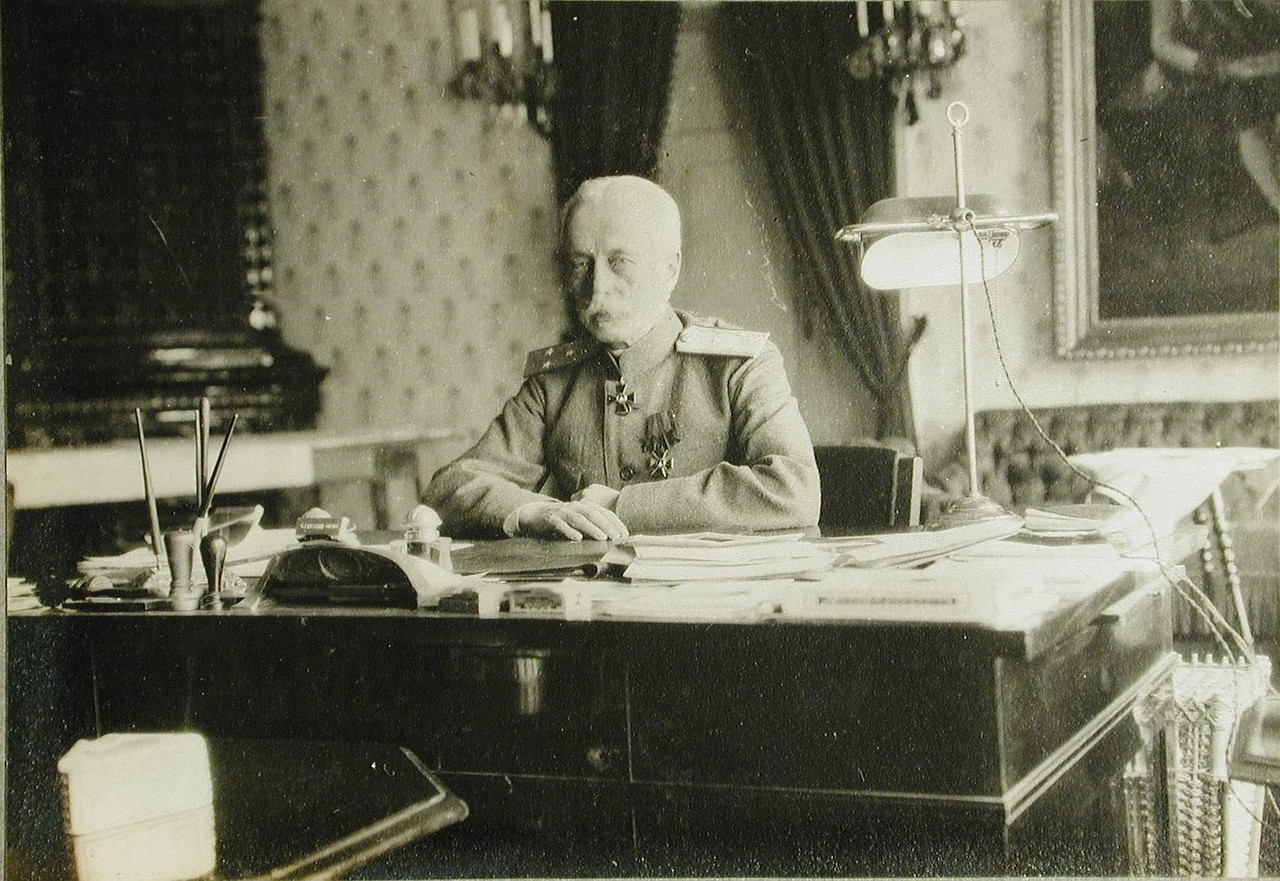
- Georgiy Bobrinsky in 1915

Governor General of the General Government of Galicia and Bukovina
- In office 5 September 1914 – 14 July 1915
- Preceded by: Established
- Succeeded by: Fyodor Trepov

Personal details
- Born: 23 July 1863 Saint Petersburg, Russian Empire
- Died: 7 March 1928 (aged 64) Paris, France

Military service
- Allegiance: Russian Empire
- Branch/service: Imperial Russian Army
- Battles/wars: Russo-Japanese War; World War I

Count Georgiy Aleksandrovich Bobrinsky (Russian: Гео́ргий Алекса́ндрович Бо́бринский; 23 July [O.S. 11 July] 1863 – 7 March 1928) was a Russian military and government figure, Adjutant general, and governor general of the General Government of Galicia and Bukovina from 1914 to 1915.

He was a son of Count Aleksandr Bobrinsky, a grandson of Catherine the Great.
