= Nikolay Alekseyevich Bobrinski =

Russian zoologist (1890–1964)

Professor Count Nikolay Alekseyevich Bobrinsky (Russian: Никола́й Алексе́евич Бо́бринский; 10 March 1890 – 27 December 1964) was a Russian zoologist and biogeographer. He was a student of M.A. Menzbier and was especially interested in the zoogeography of mammals. He published several influential textbooks including one on zoogeography.

== Biography ==
Bobrinsky was born in Moscow into the aristocratic Russian family of Bobrinski, Bobrinsky or Bobrinskoy (Бобринские). His father was Count Alexei Alekseevich Bobrinsky (descended from an illegitimate son of Catherine the Great and Count Grigory Orlov) and his mother Varvara was daughter of Nikolai Alexandrovich Lvov. He was mostly taken care of by English governesses and he went to the Polivanov Gymnasium. He however graduated as an external student at the Tula gymnasium where he became interested in natural sciences. He was sent to Europe along with Alexander Kots. In 1908 he went to Moscow University and worked under M. A. Menzbier. In 1911-12 he made an ornithological expedition to Armenia. During World War I he served in the Izyum Hussar regiment as a volunteer. Two of his brothers were killed and he was seriously injured in 1916 and he survived and returned with the rank of captain. After 1917 he joined the Darwin Museum under Alexander Kots. He married Maria Alekseevna Chelishcheva, grand-daughter of A.S. Khomyakov, in 1919. In 1920 the family moved to Tashkent, partly to avoid Bolshevik repression, and worked with D. N. Kashkarov. In 1925 he made expeditions to Sary Chelek and the Chatkal Range. He became interested in the zoogeography of central Asia and examined particularly the small mammals and birds. In 1934, the Bobrinski's were again forced to move to Tashkent to avoid arrest. He received a doctorate in 1943 without a thesis. His speciality was mammals and in 1944 he co-authored Mammals of the USSR (1944) along with A.P. Kuzyakin and B.A. Kuznetsov. Other publications included The Animal World and Nature of the USSR and Animal Geography (1951).

Bobrinsky died after suffering in bed for several years. He was buried in the Vostryakovsky cemetery beside those of his children and his aunt, Sofya Alekseevna.

Bobrinski's jerboa (Allactodipus bobrinskii), a species of small rodent, and Bobrinski's serotine (Eptesicus bobrinskoi), a species of vesper bat, were named in his honour.
