= Nadezhda Aleksandrovna Bobrinskaya =

Russian astronomer and humanitarian volunteer

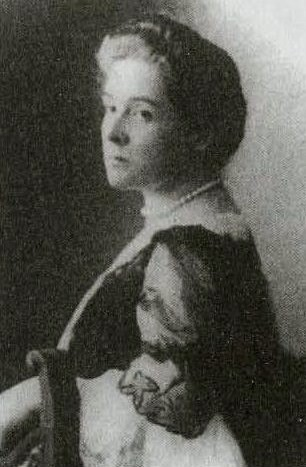
- Born: Nadezhda Aleksandrovna Polovtsova; 15/27 May 1865; Tsarskoye Selo, St. Petersburg, Russia
- Died: 20 March 1920 (aged 54); Fort-Shevchenko
- Occupation: Astronomer

Countess Nadezhda Aleksandrovna Bobrinskaya (Russian: Наде́жда Алекса́ндровна Бо́бринская, née Polovtsova, Russian: По́ловцова; May 1865 – 20 March 1920) was a Russian astronomer and humanitarian volunteer. She published a correction of the orbit of the asteroid 300 Geraldina.

== Life ==
Her parents were the historian Alexander Polovtsov, who founded the Russian Historical Society, and Nadezha Mikhailovna Polovtsova, who inherited a significant fortune via her adoptive father Alexander von Stieglitz.

In February 1883, she married the statesman and archaeologist Aleksei Aleksandrovich Bobrinsky; it has been suggested that during her marriage she and her husband encouraged the Grand Duke Nicholas Mikhailovich to conspire against the Empress, but the evidence is circumstantial.

At some point, she was an employee of the Pulkovo Observatory, where she made her observations of the asteroid 300 Geraldina. She also made observations of the asteroid 147 Protogeneia.

By 1906, she was divorced.

During the Russo-Japanese War, she worked for the Russian Red Cross in an unknown capacity. She continued charitable work throughout World War I, and died in March 1920 of typhoid fever, contracted during the evacuation of the Ural Army.
