= Fyodor Trepov (junior) =

Russian military and government figure

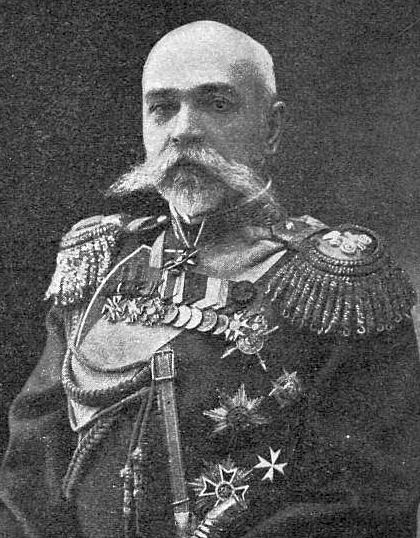
- in 1915

Governor General of the General Government of Galicia and Bukovina
- In office 4 October 1916 – 31 May 1917
- Preceded by: Georgiy Bobrinsky
- Succeeded by: Dmytro Doroshenko

Personal details
- Born: 25 May 1854
- Died: 27 March 1938 (aged 83) Nice, France

Military service
- Allegiance: Russian Empire
- Branch/service: Imperial Russian Army
- Years of service: 1873–1917
- Battles/wars: Russo-Turkish War (1877–1878); Russo-Japanese War; World War I

Fyodor Fyodorovich Trepov (Russian: Фёдор Фёдорович Тре́пов; 25 May [O.S. 13 May] 1854 – 27 March 1938) was a Russian military and government figure, General of the cavalry, governor general of the General Government of Galicia and Bukovina.

He was a son of Fyodor Trepov.

Preceded by Vladimir Sukhomlinov	Governor-General of Southwestern Krai; 1908–1914	Succeeded by
Preceded by Georgiy Bobrinsky	Governor-General of Galicia; 1916–1917	Succeeded by Dmytro Doroshenko
