= Bobrinsky =

Russian noble family

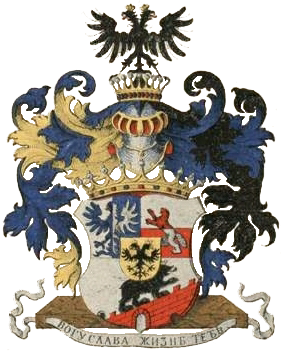
Arms of the Bobrinsky family

The Counts Bobrinsky or Bobrinskoy (Бобринские) are a Russian noble family descending from Count Aleksey Grigorievich Bobrinsky (1762–1813), who was Catherine the Great's illegitimate son by Count Grigory Orlov.

== The first Count Bobrinsky ==
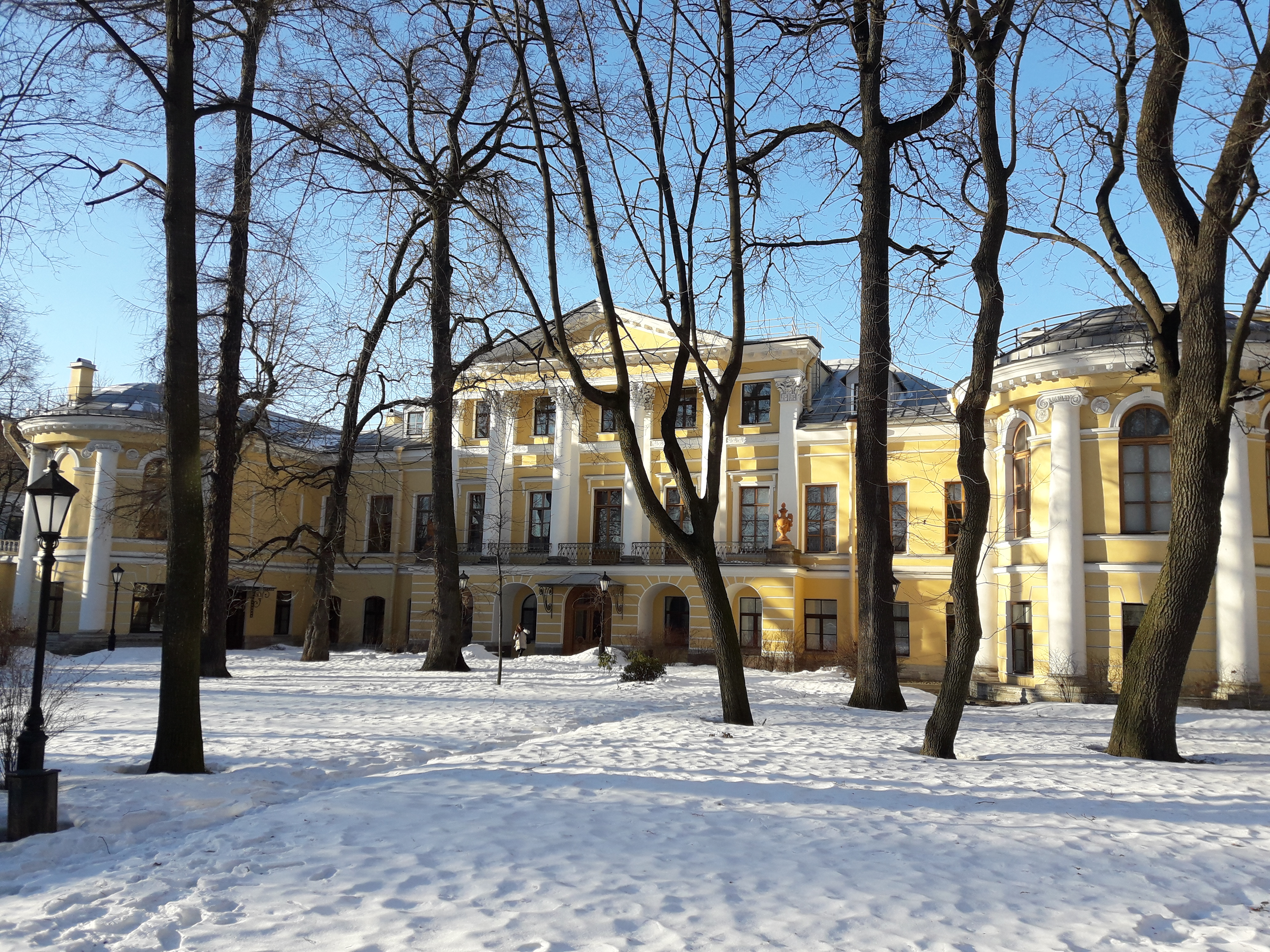
The Bobrinsky Palace on the Admiralty Canal Embankment

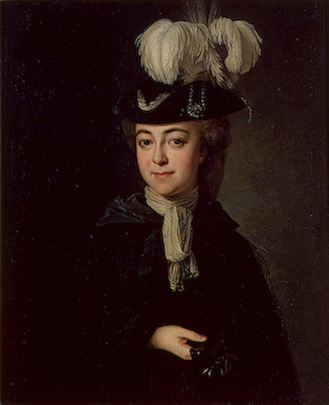
The first Count Bobrinsky

Empress Catherine II gave birth to her only official illegitimate son on April 11, 1762, several months before her ascension to the throne. Catherine had to conceal the pregnancy. When the due date came, to distract her husband, Emperor Peter III, her trusted servant Vasily Shkurin was ordered to burn his own house, knowing that the Emperor had a passion to watch the fires. The child was named Aleksey after his uncle and godfather, Count Aleksey Orlov. He was brought up in Bobriki, a village in the Tula guberniya. On April 2, 1781, Catherine sent him a letter, in which she openly avowed her maternity. She named him Bobrinsky, a surname derived from the estate he lived in. On the 5th day of his reign, Emperor Paul made his half-brother a count of the Russian Empire and promoted him to general-major. He married Baroness Anna Dorothea von Ungern-Sternberg (1769–1846) and had issue that continues to this day. The first Count Bobrinsky died on June 20, 1813, in his estate of Bogoroditsk, to the east of Tula.

Bobrinsky Palace, the Bobrinsky family seat in Bogoroditsk, was designed by Ivan Starov and constructed in the 1770s and 1780s, starting in 1773. The nearby Holy Kazan Church was completed by 1778. The park was laid out by the palace's administrator, Andrey Bolotov (1738–1833), who is better known as one of the first Russian economists. It was Bolotov who established the Children's Theatre in Bogoroditsk. The palace and estate were renovated in the 1870s. In the 20th century, the premises suffered enormous damage from the Bolsheviks, who demolished the wings of the palace in 1929, and from the Wehrmacht, who blew up the chateau in December 1941. The palace was restored in the 1960s and now functions as a museum.

== Bobrinskys in business ==
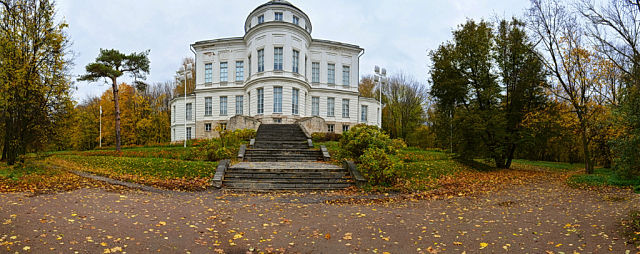
The Bogoroditsk Estate of the first count was designed by Ivan Starov and landscaped by Andrei Bolotov

Aleksey's son Count Aleksey Alekseyevich Bobrinsky (1800–1868) is remembered as the founder of the sugar-processing industry in Imperial Russia. After brief and uneventful career at the royal court, he retired from service and settled in Bogoroditsk, establishing one of the first Russian sugar refineries there. Later, he moved his operations to Ukraine, making various agricultural activities the chief source of his family income. It was thanks to him that Russia stopped importing sugar from abroad. He also published a treatise on economic theory and set up a society for development of railways, which financed the construction of the first railway in Russia. Bobrinsky's contributions to the national economics were commemorated by a bronze statue in Kiev.

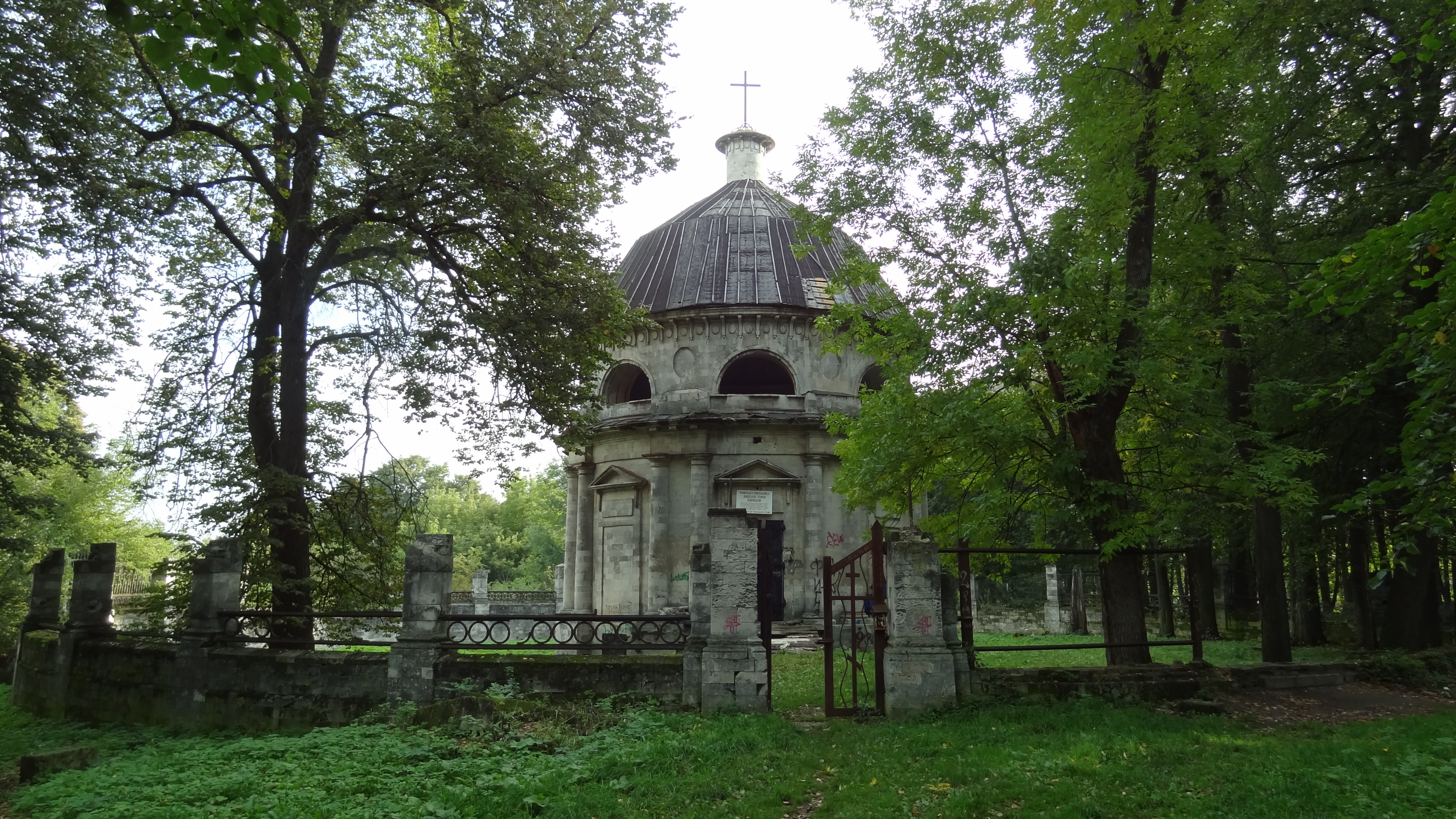
The Bobrinsky burial vault in Bobriki

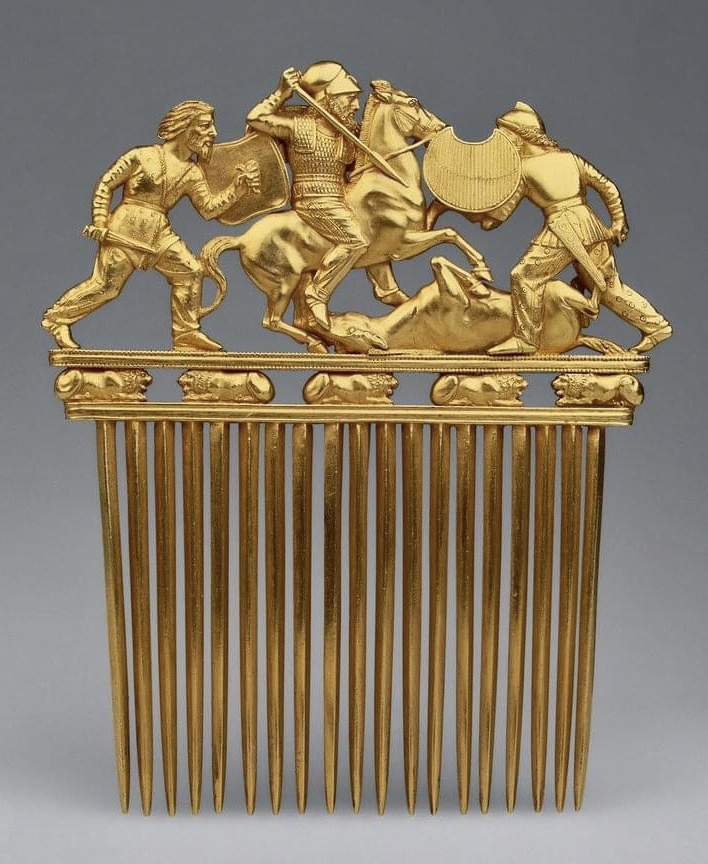
A Scythian golden comb extracted by Aleksey A. Bobrinsky Jr from the Solokha burial mound

Unlike many other Russian nobles, the Bobrinskys continued as prosperous businessmen after the 1861 emancipation of serfs, starting coal mining in their estates near Tula and helping to build railways all over Russia. Aleksey Alekseyevich's second son Count Vladimir Alekseyevich Bobrinsky (1824–1898) served as Minister of Transportation in 1868–1871, succeeded in this post by his cousin, Count Aleksey Pavlovich Bobrinsky (1826–1894).

== Bobrinskys in politics ==
The eldest great-grandson of Count Aleksey Alekseyevich was Count Aleksei Aleksandrovich Bobrinsky (1852–1927), who led the Council of United Nobility starting in 1906 and represented the nobility of the St Petersburg guberniya in the Senate and the 3rd State Duma. He was appointed into the State Council of Imperial Russia in 1912. During World War I, Bobrinskoy was elected Chairman of the Russian-English Bank. In 1916, he was appointed Deputy Minister of Interior and Minister of Agriculture. The October Revolution forced him to emigrate to France, where he actively campaigned for the monarchist cause.

Count Georgiy Aleksandrovich Bobrinsky (1863-1928) was General Governor of Galicia and Bukovina during World War I (heading the administration of the Habsburg territories of the Kingdom of Galicia and Lodomeria and the Duchy of Bukovina occupied by the Russian Imperial Army in 1914 and 1915).

Count Vladimir Alekseyevich Bobrinsky (1868–1927) was the third son of Count Aleksey Pavlovich. He was educated at Monkton Combe School, near Bath, Somerset, together with three of his younger brothers. He represented Russian nationalists in the 2nd, 3rd and 4th State Dumas, advocating speedy Russification of border regions and supporting Pyotr Stolypin's reforms. Like most of the Bobrinskys, he emigrated to France following the revolutionary nationalization of their family enterprises. He is buried in the cemetery at Montmartre.

== Bobrinskys in science ==
Apart from politics, Count Aleksey Alexandrovich Bobrinsky was a noted historian and archaeologist, Chairman of the Imperial Archaeological Commission (1886), Vice-President of the Imperial Academy of Arts (1889), and Chairman of the Free Economic Society (1894). He led the excavations of Scythian mounds near Kerch and Kyiv, describing some of his findings in the monograph on Tauric Chersonesos (1905). He was in charge of the extraction and publication of the Pereshchepina hoard.

Vladimir's nephew, Count Nikolay Alekseyevich Bobrinsky (1890–1964) specialized in biology. Unlike his relatives, he chose to remain in Moscow after the revolution and came to be recognized as one of the most prominent Soviet zoologists. Bobrinski's serotine, a species of bat, is named after him, as is Bobrinski's jerboa, a species of jerboa. His son Nikolay Nikolayevich, a geographer, who wrote a novel on the life of the first Bobrinsky, lived in Moscow until his death in 2000.

Count Alexey Alexeyevich Bobrinsky (1861–1938) was the last owner of the Bobriki estate. A scholarly ethnographer, he organized three expeditions to the tribes and villagers in the Pamir Mountains, accompanied by a photographer and a linguist. His observations were published and are now available in an archive in the State Historical Museum. Another part of his collections of utensils and folk art, including the Bobrinski bucket, is at the Hermitage Museum. After the revolutions of 1917, he settled at his villa in Seis am Schlern. The Ismaili peoples among whom he travelled respect his work and reputation. The 150th anniversary of his birth was celebrated in 2011.
