= Aleksei Bobrinsky (historian) =

Russian historian & statesman (1852–1927)

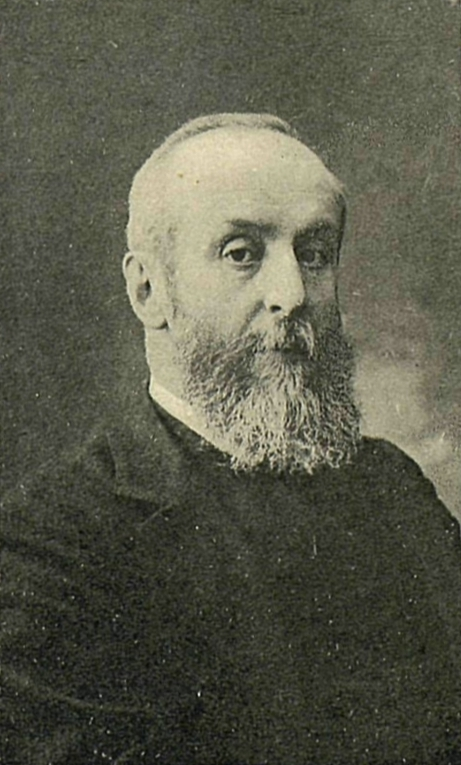
Aleksei Bobrinsky.

Count Aleksei Aleksandrovich Bobrinsky (Russian: Алексе́й Алекса́ндрович Бо́бринский, 31 May 1852 – 2 September 1927) was a Russian historian and statesman from the Bobrinsky family.

== Biography ==
Bobrinsky was born in St. Petersburg. His great-grandfather, the first Count Bobrinsky, had been the son of the Russian empress, Catherine the Great and Count Grigory Orlov. Aleksei attended St. Petersburg University and worked in the Chancellery of the Committee of Ministers.

He was elected Marshal of Nobility of St. Petersburg Uezd, 1875–1878. In 1878 he was elected Marshal of Nobility of St. Petersburg Gubernia. He also presided over St. Petersburg Zemstvo assemblies.

For over thirty years Bobrinsky was chairman of the Imperial Archeological Commission, which under his guidance greatly increased its financing and staffing. He was the first to explore Scythian burial mounds (kurgans) scattered across his Middle Dnieper estates. He also led the first excavations near Kerch and Sevastopol, describing some of his findings in the monograph on Tauric Chersonesos (1905). Bobrinsky was in charge of the extraction and publication of the Pereshchepina hoard. He also took part in digging the Solokha kurgan where his son found a famous Scythian golden comb.

In 1889, Count Bobrinsky was appointed Vice-Chairman of the Academy of Science (1889). He was also head of the Orphanages of the Empress Marie (1893–1896), chairman of the Free Economic Society (1894), a member of the Agricultural Committee in the Ministry of Agriculture, senator (1896), and chairman of the Union of Russian Nobility (1905). He was elected to the State Duma in 1907, and to the State Council in 1912.

He was Assistant Minister of the Interior (March — July 1916) and Minister of Agriculture (July - November 1916). In this role he clashed with Mitrofan Voronkov and Vladimir Groman, when a special Council was charged with fixing grain prices: Voronkov and Groman argued for fixing prices at a lower value, but Bobrinsky, a spokesperson for landed interest, at first succeeded in ensuring the prices were set quite high. However, when the War Minister Dmitry Shuvayev became involved, Bobrinsky's policy was overthrown and Voronkov became a much quoted spokesperson on the topic.

Alexis Bobrinsky left Russia after the October Revolution. He lived in France, where he actively campaigned for the monarchist cause. He died in Grasse.

== See also ==
- Counts Bobrinsky

Preceded by Aleksandr Naumov	Minister of agriculture of Russia; 21 July 1916 – 14 November 1916	Succeeded by Alexander Rittikh
