= Borys Butenko =

Ukrainian railway manager

- Борис Аполлонович Бутенко
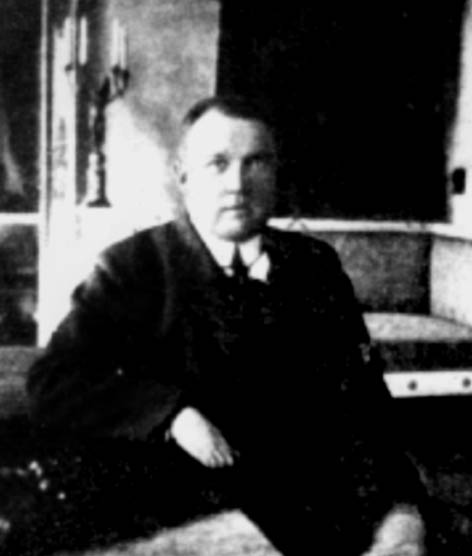

Minister of Railways
- In office 3 May 1918 – 14 November 1918
- Monarch: Pavlo Skoropadsky
- Prime Minister: Fedir Lyzohub
- Preceded by: Yevhen Sokovych
- Succeeded by: E. Landsberg

Personal details
- Died: 9 December 1940 Budapest, Kingdom of Hungary
- Party: Ukrainian People's Hromada
- Occupation: railway engineer

Borys Apollonovych Butenko (Ukrainian: Борис Аполлонович Бутенко; died 9 December 1940) was a Ukrainian railway engineer, who served as Minister of Railways (Note: The technical term for railways was the connection routes (Ukrainian: шляхи сполучень). In the Russian version, the term literally meant the communication routes (Russian: пути сообщения).) of the Ukrainian State in 1918. He previously worked as manager of the Kamianets Railway.

== Biography ==
=== Early career ===
Butenko hailed from Kherson Governorate. He graduated from Saint Petersburg Institute of Railway Engineers. Before the revolution Butenko served as the manager of Hrechany train depot and headed Podolian Railways. He was a member of the Ukrainian People's Hromada organization established by Pavlo Skoropadsky.

In April 1918, Butenko became one of the organizers of the Hetman's coup, which brought Skoropadsky to power in Ukraine. Butenko's appointment as Minister of Communications on 3 May 1918 was opposed by members of the Social Democratic, Socialist-Revolutionaries and Socialist Independist parties, who accused him of being a Ukrainophobe. Despite this, in his post, Butenko became known for introducing Ukrainization measures.

=== Ministerial service ===
After being appointed minister, on 15 May Butenko issued an order, according to which the Southwestern Railways were to be renamed into Right-bank Railways, Southern Railways into Sloboda Railways, and Catherine Railways into Zaporizhzhia Railways. Another decree issued on 17 May mandated that all inscriptions on railway stations, as well as seals, stamps and forms, were to be in the Ukrainian language. Telegraph stations employed Ukrainian-language correctors, and railway employees took Ukrainian lessons; those who failed to master the language risked being fired. On Butenko's personal initiative, a commission was created to develop Ukrainian technical terminology for railway transport.

After becoming minister, Butenko ordered the dissolution of all political councils, committees, party branches, and armed squads organized by transport employees during the revolution. Under his management, every railway directorate employed a commissar who personally reported to the minister and remained in contact with the hetman's authority. In order to solve the issue of debts, Butenko's ministry lowered the wages of railway employees, reduced the number of personnel, and abolished the right of railwaymen to free passage. At the same time, special compensational payments were introduced in order to cover the workers' rising expenses. By mid-1918 Butenko's ministry managed to restore regular operation of Ukrainian railways following a crisis caused by war and Bolshevik occupation. Under Butenko's leadership, the ministry worked on a plan of reconstruction of Zvirynets area in Kyiv, which had been damaged by explosions at an artillery warehouse, and also drafted projects on the establishment of a canal between the Dnieper and Siversky Donets, construction of a lock system on the Dnieper Rapids, planned oil exploration in the area of Odesa etc.

Following the establishment of a railway workers' trade union, Butenko's ministry refused to legalize it. After the declaration of a railway strike, he ordered to fire its participants. On 29 July 1918, Butenko survived an assassination attempt near his summer home in Pushcha-Vodytsia. According to an official investigation, the attempted murder was organized by the railwaymen's strike committee. The failed assassination was overshadowed by the killing of German field marshal Hermann von Eichhorn in Kyiv, which took place one day later. By mid-August 1918, the wave of railway strikes had been extinguished following repressions by the hetman's administration and Austro-German command. The government agreed to minor concessions, such as payment of delayed wages and improvement of supplies.

=== Resignation and emigration ===
Due to continuing sabotage and theft on the railways, on 20 October 1918 Butenko promoted the adoption of a special law, which increased security measures on the railways. On 26 October, he was reappointed to his ministerial position. On 12 November, he issued a decree introducing a state of emergency in railway transport. However, on 14 November 1918, Butenko left his post following the resignation of the Lyzohub Government.

After staying in Ukraine for some time, in 1919 he was forced to emigrate to Germany, and later settled in Hungary. In emigration, Butenko initially remained close to Skoropadsky, but also cooperated with Archduke Wilhelm of Austria. Looking for reconciliation with Russian monarchist circles, in May 1921 he took part in the international congress of Russian monarchists in Bad Reichenhall.

It was long believed that Butenko died in 1926 in Budapest. However, an obituary published by the Magyar Távirati Iroda states that his death took place on 9 December 1940 at a hospital. He was buried on 15 December of the same year at the New Cemetery in Budapest.
