= Nikolai Petrov (academician) =

Russian theologist and philologist (1840–1921)

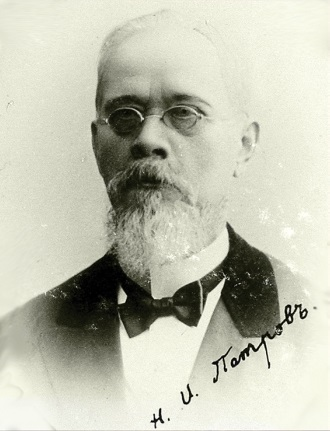
Mykola Ivanovych Petrov

Nikolai Ivanovych Petrov (Russian: Никола́й Ива́нович Петро́в; 1840–1921) was a Russian theologian and philologist, who for several years worked in the Imperial Russian Southwestern Krai, one of founding members of the National Academy of Sciences of Ukraine.

Petrov worked for the Kiev Theological Academy for approximately 40 years. In 1918 attended the Ukrainian Science Society Extraordinary General Assembly where an issue concerning the establishment of the Ukrainian Academy of Sciences was discussed. Petrov was elected among the first academician of the newly established institution.

== Works ==
- About origin and composition of the Slavic-Russian printing Prologue (Russian: «О происхождении и составе славяно-русского печатного Пролога», 1875)
- Outlines out of the history of Ukrainian literature of 19th century (Russian: «Очерки из истории украинской литературы XIX века», 1884)
- Description of manuscript collections located in the city of Kiev. The collection of manuscript of Metropolitan bishop of Moscow Makaria Bulgakov, Meletsky Monastery in Volhynia, Kiev Fraternity Monastery and Kiev Theological Seminary (Russian: «Описание рукописных собраний, находящихся в городе Киеве. Собрание рукописей Московского митрополита Макария (Булгакова), Мелецкого монастыря на Волыни, Киево-Братского монастыря и Киевской духовной семинарии», 1892)
- The Kiev Academy in the second half of the 17th century (Russian: «Киевская академия во второй половине XVII века», 1895)
- The first (Little Russian) period of his life and scientific and philosophical development of Hryhoriy Savvych Skovoroda (Russian: «Первый (малорусский) период жизни и научно-философского развития Григория Саввича Сковороды», 1902)
- Outlines out of the history of Ukrainian literature of 17th and 18th centuries (Russian: «Очерки из истории украинской литературы XVII и XVIII веков», 1911)
