= Lyzohub government =

The Lyzohub Government was the first official government of Ukrainian State that was confirmed on 4 May 1918 after Pavlo Skoropadsky managed to oust the previous socialist government led by Vsevolod Holubovych and dissolve the Central Council of Ukraine. Most of its candidates were already pre-selected by Mykola Vasylenko who took the portfolio of Minister of National Education.

On October 5, 1918 the opposition represented by the Ukrainian National Union and led by Volodymyr Vynnychenko demanded almost half of government portfolios, but managed to convince the Hetman of Ukraine Pavlo Skoropadsky to include five of its own ministers. On October 24 that petition was approved. The same day several dismissed ministers wrote the "Statement of niners" where they urged the government to sign federalization agreement with Russia.

== Original composition ==
Office	Name minister	Party
Otaman	Fedir Lyzohub	Octobrists
Minister of Foreign Affairs	Dmytro Doroshenko	Socialist-Federalists
Minister of Military Affairs	Oleksandr Rohoza	
Minister of Naval Affairs	M.Maksymov	
Minister of Internal Affairs	Fedir Lyzohub	(same)
Minister of Finance	Anton Rzepecki	Cadets
Minister of Trade	Sergei Hutnik	Cadets
Minister of Labor	Yuliy Wagner	
Minister of Ways of Communication	Borys Butenko	Ukrainian People's Society
Minister of Food	Yuriy Sokolovsky	Cadets
Minister of Justice	Mykhailo Chubynsky	Cadets
Minister of Confessions	Vasiliy Zienkowski	
Minister of Health and Wardship	Vsevolod Lyubynsky	Ukrainian People's Society
Minister of National Education	Mykola Vasylenko	Cadets
Minister of Agriculture	Vasiliy Kolokoltsov	
State controller	Yuriy Afanasiev	
State secretary	Ihor Kistiakovsky	

=== Changes ===
During summer

- Yuriy Sokolovsky was replaced with Sergei Gerbel as the Minister of Food
- Mykhailo Chubynsky was replaced with A.Romanov as the Minister of Justice
- Fedir Lyzohub was relieved from being acting as the Minister of Internal Affairs which was passed to Ihor Kistiakovsky
- S.Zavadsky became the State secretary

October 24, UNU coalition

- Ihor Kistiakovsky was replaced with acting Viktor Reinbot
- Vasiliy Zienkowski was replaced with Oleksandr Lototsky
- Mykola Vasylenko was replaced with Petro Stebnytsky
- Vasiliy Kolokoltsov was replaced with Volodymyr Leontovych
- A.Romanov was replaced with Andriy Vyazlov
- Yuliy Wagner was replaced with Maksym Slavinsky
- Sergei Hutnik was replaced with Sergei Mering
- Yuriy Afanasiev was replaced with S.Petrov

== Coalition / opposition ==
- Pro-Russian: Vasylenko, Rzepecki, Grebel, Hutnik, Romanov, Zienkowski, Kokoltsev, Wagner, Afanasiev, Zavadsky
  - Union with the Triple Entente, plebiscite for the union with Russia
- Pro-Ukrainian: Kistiakovsky, Lyubynsky, Doroshenko, Butenko, Rohoza
  - Denouncing of the Brest-Litovsk treaty, complete independence
