= Petro Stebnytsky =

Ukrainian political and public figure, diplomat and statesman

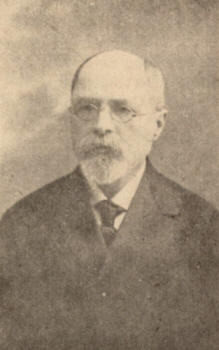

Petro Stebnytsky (1862–1923) was a Ukrainian political and public figure, diplomat and statesman. He most notably serving as Minister of Public Education and Arts in the Lyzohub Government in 1918 for the Ukrainian State, where he signed the decree establishing the National Academy of Sciences of Ukraine. He also briefly served as Supreme Judge of the UNR, before being arrested by the Bolsheviks.

== Early life ==
Stebnytsky was born on 25 November 1862 in the village of Horenychi, which was then part of the Kiev Governorate in the Russian Empire. He was born into a religious family, as his father J. Stebnytskyi ran the local parish and literacy school. Petro was initially educated at the local parish school, before attending the First Kyiv Gymnasium. In 1886, he graduated from Kyiv University with a degree in mathematics and physics, and afterwords he moved to the city of Saint Petersburg. Initially, he gave private lectures to the public of the city, before entering government service in the Ministry of Finance. He worked in this department until 1904, rising to the rank of collegiate councillor. He then switched to the Main Directorate of Posts and Telegraphs, where he headed the commercial department of the directorate until 1917. In Saint Petersburg, he became a leading member of the Ukrainian community, directing the Charitable Society for Publishing Generally Useful and Cheap Books, supporting Ukrainian books and pamphlets, and helping organize the Society of Ukrainian Progressives.

== Political career ==
Following the February Revolution, he was nominated as a representative of the Ukrainian Central Rada to the Provisional Government. However, he resigned due to conflicts with Russian democratic leaders, and he moved permanently back to Ukraine in June 1918. In Ukraine, he was appointed Senator of the Administrative General Court in July 1918, and then later became Minister of Public Education and Arts in the Lyzohub Government, replacing Mykola Vasylenko. As minister, he signed the decree that established the Ukrainian Academy of Sciences. In January 1919, he was appointed Supreme Judge of the UNR, but was soon after arrested by the Bolsheviks. However, he was released after public pressure. During his final years under repression, he was very poor and spent his last months in a military hospital in Pechersk, then at his home on Volodymyrska Street in Kyiv within the Ukrainian SSR, where he died in 1923.
