= Pavlo Tutkovsky =

Ukrainian geologist and geographer (1858–1930)

Pavlo Apollonovich Tutkovsky
- Павло Аполлонович Тутковський
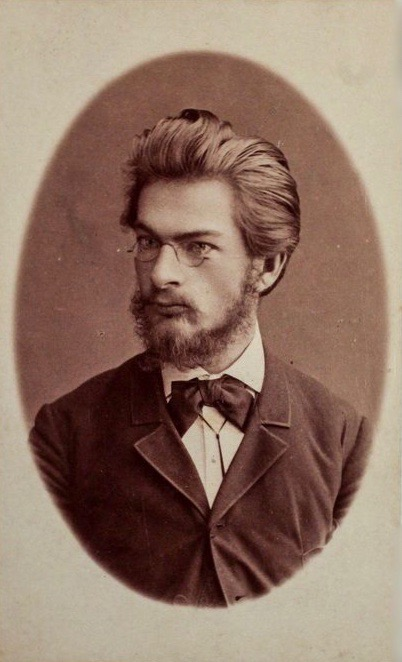
- Tutkovsky in a portrait from the 1890s.
- Born: March 1, 1858; Lipovets, Kiev Governorate, Russian Empire
- Died: July 3, 1930 (aged 72); Kyiv, Kyiv Oblast, Ukrainian SSR, Soviet Union
- Resting place: Lukyanivske cemetery 50.2804°N 30.2712°E
- Education: Kyiv University
- Children: Olga Sno
- Scientific career
- Workplaces: Taras Shevchenko National University of Kyiv; Institute of Geological Sciences of the National Academy of Sciences of Ukraine

Pavlo Tutkovsky (Ukrainian: Павло Аполлонович Тутковський; 1 March 1858 – 3 June 1930) was a Ukrainian geologist, geographer, and professor. He is best known as a founding member of the All-Ukrainian Academy of Sciences and for establishing the Institute of Geological Sciences of the academy in 1926.

Born in Lipovets into an Imperial Russian noble father and the Western European aristocratic family of Lippomano, he first entered in 1877 Kyiv University in their natural sciences department. After graduating in 1882, he worked at the university and was also elected a member of the Kyiv Society of Naturalists, for whom he would conduct geographical research for until 1902. Moving to Lutsk in 1900, he became an inspector of public schools for Lutsky Uyezd until moving to Zhytomyr to become director of public schools in the Volyn Province in 1909. In 1911 he defended his doctoral dissertation at Moscow University and was awarded the title of "Doctor of Geography". Afterward, he came back to Kyiv University to become a professor in the Department of Geography.

In 1917 he created the Geographical Institute at Kyiv University, and in 1919, became a founding member of the All-Ukrainian Academy of Sciences. He was immediately elected chairman and also head of the Physics and Mathematics Department. From 1924 to 1926, he then headed the research Department of Goology, which in 1926 was reorganized into the Institute of Geological Sciences, and of which he became the director. In 1930 he died in Kyiv.

== Early life ==
Tutkovsky was born on 1 March 1858 in Lipovets, which was then part of the Kiev Governorate in the Russian Empire at the time of his birth. He was born into a family of family of employees; his father was named Apollon Lukich Tutkovsky and his mother was Yulia Lippomano. A grandfather of his served as a clerk for the Zaporozhian Cossacks and had the last name Korczak-Tutko, but when the Liquidation of the Zaporozhian Sich occurred Catherine II granted nobility to the family and so the family's paternal surname was changed to Tutkovsky. His maternal side was French and Italian from the aristocratic family of Lippomano, although Yulia herself had been raised in Poland. Pavlo was strongly influenced by his mother, Yulia, because she was a woman of high culture due to her aristocratic family and musically gifted.

After graduating from the First Zhytomyr Gymnasium with a silver medal in 1877 he started attending the natural sciences department of the Faculty of Physics and Mathematics of Kyiv University. In 1879 he was temporarily expelled from the faculty for participating in a student protest. After eventually being reinstated, he graduated from the faculty in 1882.

== Career ==
Konstantin Matviyovych Feofilaktov, who taught courses in geology at the school, recommended Tutkovsky upon his completion of studies to the Department of Geology and Mineralogy to prepare for a professorship at the university. In 1883 he was appointed conservator of the mineralogical and geological office of the university, which he did until 1895. That same year he was elected a member of the Kyiv Society of Naturalists. On behalf of the society, from 1884 to 1902, he conducted geopolitical research in nearly every oblast in Ukraine, studying fossil microfauna and the groundwater. Specifically, he worked on studying the underground groundwater of Kyiv and the city's general water supply, which he published in 1895. In 1899 he published one of the first detailed studies of Lake Svitiaz on its scientific properties along with the legends surrounding the lake.

In 1900 he moved to Lutsk to do field work as a freelance employee of the geological committee of the city. In 1904 he became curator of the Kyiv Educational District alongside becoming inspector of public schools in the Lutsky Uyezd. As inspector, he raised the issue of the Lutsk two-class city school, where most of the poor school children went, was drastically overcrowded and wrote numerous times to the Lutsk City Council in order to allocate funding. He moved again in 1909 to Zhytomyr, working as the director of public schools in the Volyn Province and helped work in the Society of Volyn Researchers, which in 1910 he became the de facto leader of as its vice-chairman. He helped create the Volyn Centre Museum through the society, which became independent in 1914 and also transferred many of his collections to the museum to get it started. He published geographical work during this time on the Volyn Province and the city of Zhytomyr, and also notably studied the Slovechansko-Ovruch ridge.

In 1911 he defended his doctoral dissertation at Moscow University entitled "Fossil deserts of the Northern Hemisphere", which dealt primarily with the nature of Volyn. For his dissertation, he was awarded the title of "Doctor of Geography", and Kazan University also awarded him a doctorate in mineralogy and geology. After being elected a private associate professor at Kyiv University, he moved again to Kyiv and in 1914 became the head of the Department of Geography there.

In 1917 he created the Geographical Institute at Kyiv University, which lasted for several years. In November 1917 he also became a professor at the newly-formed Ukrainian Pedagogical Academy and Ukrainian People's University. The following year, in April 1918, he was elected head of the Natural Sciences Section of the Ukrainian Scientific Society. During his time as president there, he created new sections of the society and started the journal "Вісник природознавства". Working together with other representatives of the Ukrainian National University, he participated in pushing for the formation of the Ukrainian Academy of Sciences from July to September 1918, which was approved on 14 November 1918 by Pavlo Skoropadsky with him becoming one of the eight original members of the academy. He was also elected chairman of the board immediately after, where he founded the geology department of the academy and became head of the Commission for the Study of Natural Resources of Ukraine. In 1919 he was elected head of the Physics and Mathematics Department in addition to the other positions.

From 1924 to 1926 he was then head of the research Department of Geology at the Ukrainian Academy of Sciences, which was reorganized in 1926 as the "Institute of Geological Sciences of the National Academy of Sciences of Ukraine". He was elected the director of this newly formed institute. During the last few months of his life the State Political Directorate labelled him as a "bourgeois nationalist" for his membership in the All-Union Central Executive Committee and being a deputy of the Kyiv City Council, and also deemed him as irreconcilable.

== Personal life ==
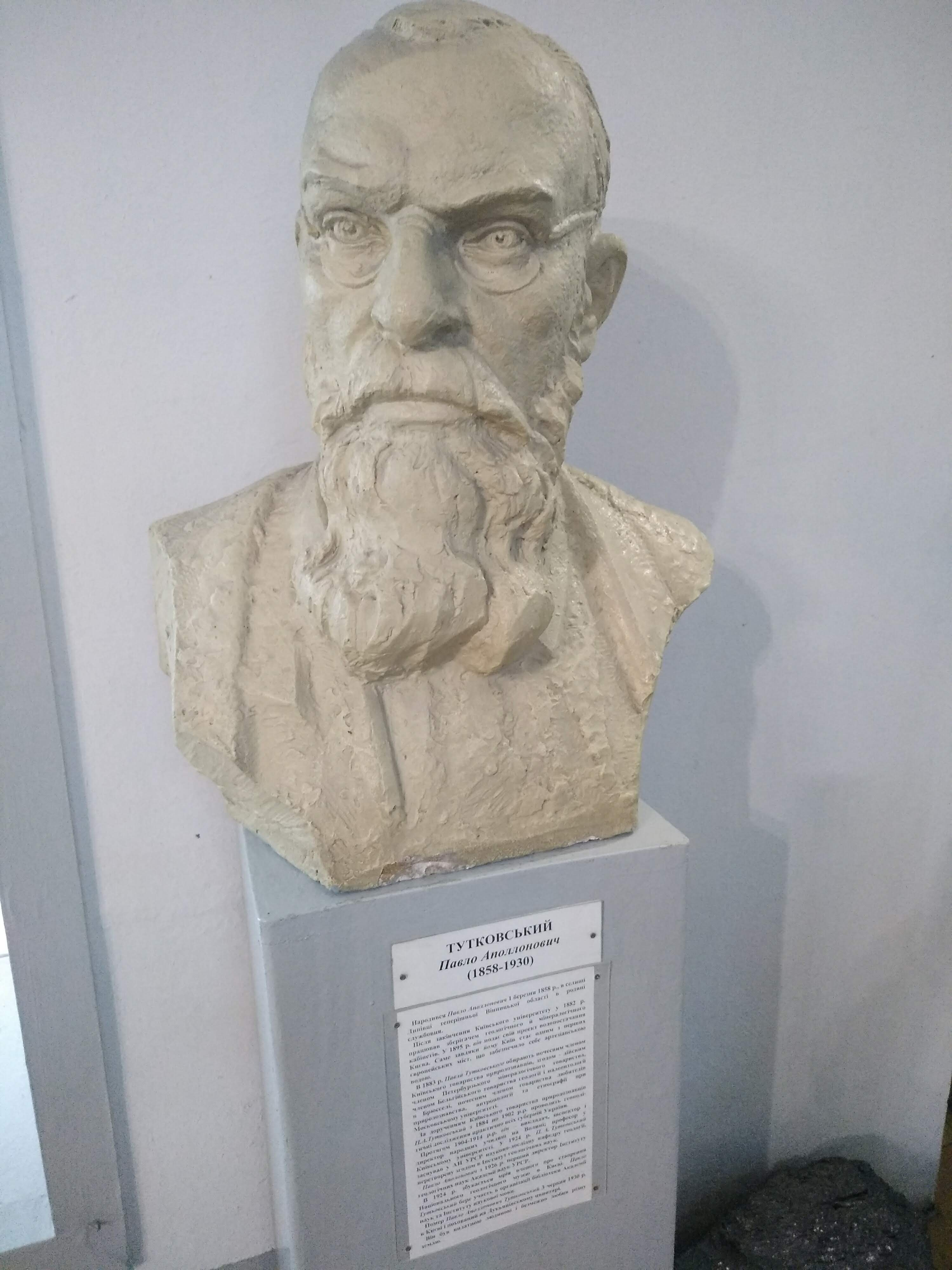
A bust at the National Museum of Natural History of Tutkovsky in Kyiv.

In 1877, while a first-year student, he married 17-year-old Olena Dmytrivna Bahaliya, the adopted daughter of D.I. Bahaliya and who also became an academician in the Ukrainian Academy of Sciences. They had a daughter in 1881 named Olga Pavlivna Sno.

=== Death ===
On 3 June 1930, Tutkovsky died in Kyiv. He was buried in Lukyanivske cemetery.

== Honours and awards ==
In 2007 the P. A. Tutkovsky Prize of the National Academy of Sciences of Ukraine was established by the Department of Earth Sciences within the academy for outstanding scientific research in the fields of geology, geography, oceanography, geoecology, climatology, and meteorology.

- Full member of the All-Ukrainian Academy of Sciences (1919)
- Full member of the Academy of Sciences of the Byelorussian SSR (1928)
