= Volodymyr Kosynsky =

Ukrainian and Russian economist (1864–1938)

Vladimir Kosinsky / Volodymyr Kosynsky
- Володимир Андрійович Косинський
- Born: 13 August 1864; Doroshivka, Chernigov Governorate, Imperial Russia
- Died: 5 November 1938 (aged 74); Riga, Latvia
- Occupations: Economist, professor

Academic background
- Education: Moscow State University
- Thesis: Small loan institutions in Germany: Their history in connection with some aspects of the economic life of this country (1901)
- Doctoral advisor: Alexander Chuprov

Academic work
- Discipline: Political economics
- Institutions: Moscow State University; Riga Polytechnic Institute; Novorossia University; Kyiv Polytechnic Institute; University of Latvia

Volodymyr Andriyovych Kosynskyi or Vladimir Kosinskiy (Ukrainian: Володимир Андрійович Косинський) was a Ukrainian and Russian economist and professor, one of founding members of the National Academy of Sciences of Ukraine, and Ukrainian minister of labor.

Born in affluent noble family, Kosynskyi received his secondary education from the Novhorod-Siverskyi gymnasium which finished in 1883. In 1887 he graduated from the faculty of Physics and Mathematics of the Moscow State University and at the same time he passed the external examinations for the full course of legal sciences (Juridical Science). For some time Kosynskyi worked as a teacher of mathematics in various gymnasiums. In 1892-1894 he was professorial scholarship recipient at the department of political economy and statistics of the Moscow State University. His doctoral advisor was Alexander Chuprov. In 1896-1897 Kosynskyi went on research trip abroad to Germany and Austria (Austria-Hungary). In 1900 he was awarded Privatdozent of the department of political economy and statistics of the Moscow State University and in 1901 defended his political economy magistrate thesis "Small loan institutions in Germany: Their history in connection with some aspects of the economic life of this country".

In 1902-1904 Kosynskyi worked as an adjunct professor at the Riga Polytechnic Institute. Since 1904 he worked as a professor at Imperial Novorossiya University (today Odesa University) at the Police Law department and later a dean of the Juridical Faculty. In 1907 Kosynskyi defended his political economy doctoral thesis "To the agrarian question: Peasant and landlord economy" in the Moscow State University. in 1905 he was involved in preparation of the Imperial Russian Constitution bill.

In 1907 Kosynskyi was brought to criminal responsibility (abetment in civil disorder) and fired from the position of dean, but later was acquitted. Since 1909 he was a professor of political economy at the Kyiv Polytechnic Institute agrarian division and at the same time working at the Kyiv Commercial Institute. During the times of Russian Provisional Government Kosynskyi participated in the Central Land Committee and the State Economic Conference.

Since August 1917 Kosynskyi was a member of the Ukrainian Central Council from Constitutional Democratic Party as a representative of Russian minority. In 1918 he was a member of the Commission in preparation of bill on establishment of the Ukrainian Academy of Sciences. Later that year he headed the Ministry of Labor. Following fall of the Hetman Skoropadsky regime, Kosynskyi suffered persecutions from government authorities of the Ukrainian People's Republic and later the Ukrainian Socialist Soviet Republic. In 1919 he was official authorized to return to his work in the Ukrainian Academy of Sciences and the Kyiv Polytechnic Institute. In 1921 Kosynskyi worked in the Kamianets-Podilskyi Institute of National Education, but later emigrated.

== Works ==
- Small loan institutions in Germany: Their history in connection with some aspects of the economic life of this country (Russian: «Учреждения для мелкого кредита в Германии: Их история в связи с некоторыми сторонами экономической жизни этой страны», 1901)
- Precise knowledge and social studies (Russian: «Точное знание и обществоведение», 1903)
- On the issue about measures for the development of productive forces of Russia (Russian: «К вопросу о мерах по развитию производственных сил России», 1904)
- To the agrarian question, issue 1: Peasant and landlord economy (Russian: «К аграрному вопросу, вып. 1: Крестьянское и помещичье хозяйство», 1907)
- To the agrarian question, issue 2: Land debt and mobilization of land property (Russian: «К аграрному вопросу, вып. 2: Земельный задолженность и мобилизация земельной собственности», 1914)

Political offices
Preceded by Maksym Slavinsky	Minister of Labor of Ukraine; 1918	Succeeded by Leonid Mykhailiv
