= Mykola Vasylenko =

Ukrainian historian and lawyer (1866–1935)

- Микола Василенко
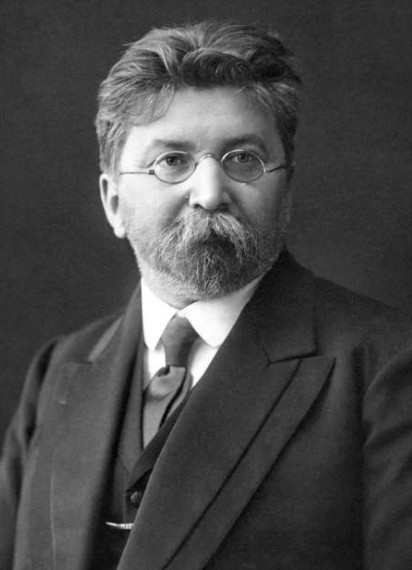
- Born: 14 February 1866; Esman, Chernigov Governorate, Russian Empire (now in Ukraine)
- Died: 3 October 1935 (aged 69); Kiev, Ukrainian SSR, Soviet Union (now Kyiv, Ukraine)
- Education: Imperial Dorpat University
- Occupations: Historian, law professor
- Scientific career
- Fields: History of Russia; History of Ukraine; Legal history
- Workplaces: St. Vladimir Imperial University of Kiev; Ukrainian University; Kiev Higher Female Courses
- Thesis: A critical overview of literature on the history of Zemskie Sobory (1890)

Minister of National Education
- In office 4 May 1918 – 25 October 1918
- Prime Minister: Fedir Lyzohub
- Preceded by: Viacheslav Prokopovych
- Succeeded by: Petro Stebnytsky

Otaman of the Council of Ministers (acting)
- In office 30 April 1918 – 4 May 1918
- Monarch: Pavlo Skoropadsky
- Preceded by: Mykola Sakhno-Ustymovych (acting)
- Succeeded by: Fedir Lyzohub

Personal details
- Party: Society of Ukrainian Progressivists; Constitutional Democratic Party
- Spouse: Natalia Polonska-Vasylenko
- Education: University of Tartu; Kiev University; Odesa University

Signature
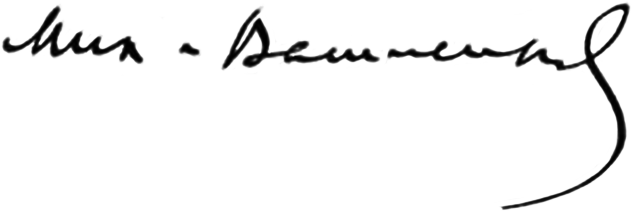

Mykola Prokopovych Vasylenko (Ukrainian: Микола Прокопович Василенко; Russian: Николай Прокофьевич Василенко; 14 February 1866 – 3 October 1935) was a Ukrainian scholar and public figure. He briefly served as temporary Otaman of the Council of Ministers (a post akin to that of Prime Minister), later holding the post of Minister of Education and Director of the All-Ukrainian Academy of Sciences (a predecessor to the modern National Academy of Sciences).

== Biography ==
=== Early life and scientific career ===
Mykola Vasylenko was born on 14 February [O.S. 2 February] 1866 in the village of Esman (today a small settlement of Hlukhiv Raion). He finished a progymnasium in Glukhov and a full gymnasium in Poltava. After graduation Vasylenko studied at the history and philology faculty of the Imperial Dorpat University. In 1890 he defended his dissertation, "A critical overview of literature on the history of Zemskie Sobory", becoming a Kandidat nauk in Russian history.

Since 1890 Vasylenko worked as a teacher of history in Kiev gymnasiums, simultaneously working for the Historical society of Nestor the Chronicler. At the same time he attended the lectures of Volodymyr Antonovych, Vladimir Ikonnikov, Oleksandr Lazarevsky and others at the St. Vladimir Imperial University of Kiev. Vasylenko also was co-editor and published his scientific works in the journal Kievskaya starina (Kiev of old). In 1893-94 his first fundamental scientific works, particularly the monograph "The question of servitude in the Southwestern Krai", were published.

Vasylenko also authored works dedicated to Ukrainian history and ethnography, in particular studying the scientific contribution of Osyp Bodiansky. He contributed to the magazines Kievskaya Starina, Ukrainskaya Zhizn and Notes of the Shevchenko Scientific Society, and wrote articles for the Brockhaus and Efron Encyclopedic Dictionary. Between 1901 and 1908 he published a series of documents dedicated to the social, legal and economic history of Little Russia, in particular Hadiach and Kyiv regiments.

=== Beginning of political involvement ===
During 1903-05 Vasylenko was a researcher for the Statistics Committee of the Kiev Governorate. He also was a member of yiev Old Hromada as well as other public and cultural societies. Vasylenko sympathised with the 1905 Russian Revolution, and during the period he edited a newspaper, Kievskie otkliki. For his illegal fundraising to help workers of Saint Petersburg and Kiev, support of the 1905 uprising of the sappers in Kiev, connections with revolutionary leaders and the publication of articles of "anti-state" content in his newspaper, Vasylenko was convicted to a year in prison which he served in the Kresty Prison in Saint Petersburg. During his imprisonment Vasylenko studied law, eventually passing the examinations of the Law faculty of the Imperial Novorossiya University.

In 1909 he was admitted to the St. Vladimir Imperial University of Kiev as a privatdozent. At the time Vasylenko was a member of secret public organization and political alliance, the Society of Ukrainian Progressivists. In 1910 he received the academic degree of Master of Law. However, due to "political unreliability" the Imperial administration prohibited him to teach in higher educational institutions. Therefore, Vasylenko worked as a fellow barrister for the Odessa court chamber.

Around that time in 1910 Vasylenko joined the Constitutional Democratic Party (the Kadets), which agreed to the use of the Ukrainian language in schools, courts, churches, although they promoted only the cultural autonomy of Ukraine. His affiliation with the Kadets negatively affected relationships of Vasylenko with activists of Ukrainian national-liberation movement.

=== Government service ===
After the February Revolution, on the initiative of Mykhailo Hrushevsky, Mykola Vasylenko was invited to the Central Council of Ukraine as deputy chairman, but he did not actively participate in the council's sessions. On March 24, 1917 the Russian Provisional Government appointed Vasylenko as a curator of the Kiev school district and on August 19, 1917 he became the Deputy Minister of Education in the Russian Provisional Government. Vasylenko was a supporter of an evolutionary development of the system of Ukrainian national education, a position that did not correspond to the policy of Ukrainisation of education developed by the I and II All-Ukrainian Teachers congresses and carried out by the General Secretariat of Education.

In January 1918 Vasylenko served as a collegiate member of the Ukrainian General Court. After the establishment of the Hetmanate, he was appointed its minister of education. On that post Vasylenko contributed to the foundation state universities in Kyiv and Kamianets, as wella s in the establishment of the Ukrainian Academy of Sciences. In August 1918 he became president of the State Senate of the Ukrainian State. On 17 October 1918 Vasylenko was among the signatories of a letter addressed to the Council of Ministers, which promoted the idea of a federation with non-Bolshevik Russia.

=== Later years ===
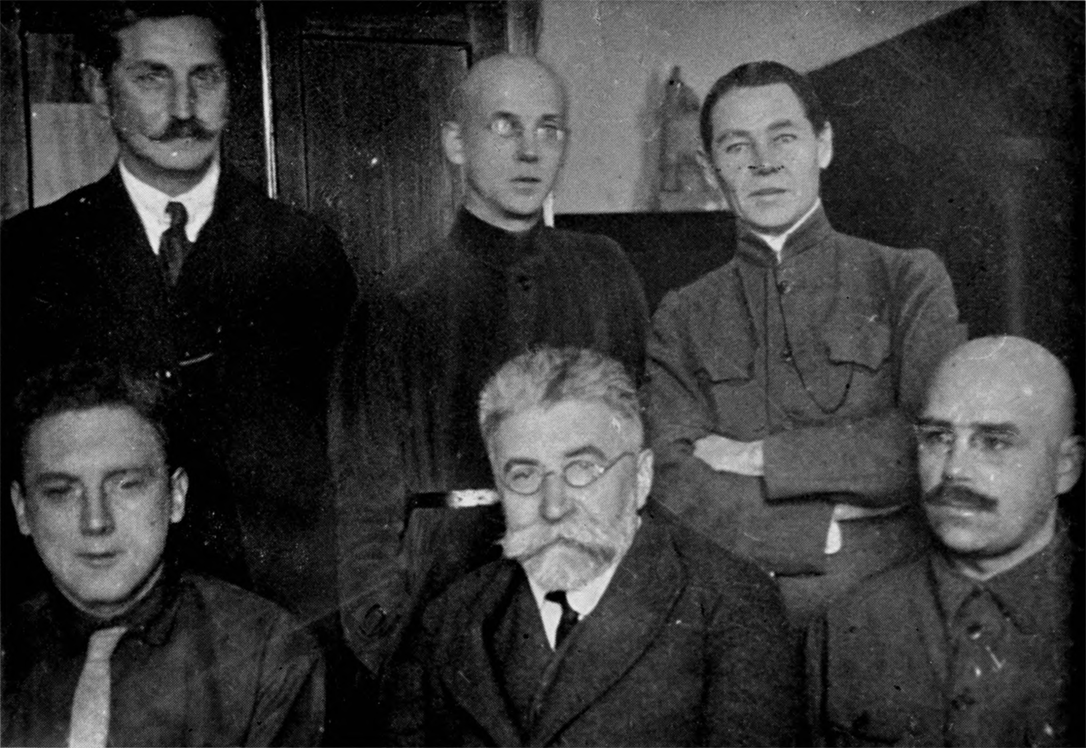
Vasylenko with fellow members of the Ukrainian Academy of Sciences, 1924

In 1920 Vasylenko became fellow of the Ukrainian Academy of Sciences, and until 1929 served as head of its department of social and economic sciences. In 1921 was elected to head the academy, however Soviet authorities refused to approve his candidacy. In April 1923 Vasylenko married Natalia Polonska, a fellow historian and his former gymnasium student. Following Vasylenko's arrest on accusations of counter-revolutionary activities in September of the same year, she petitioned Mykhailo Hrushevsky, Mykola Skrypnyk and Ahatanhel Krymsky to contribute to his release.

In 1924 Vasylenko was sentenced to 10 years of imprisonment for alleged participation in an anti-government organization, but the sentence was eventully nullified due to an amnesty. The scientist's health was damaged by the arrest, and part of his flat was forcibly allocated to a worker's family. During the 1920s, Vasylenko headed a commission dedicated to studies of Western Russian and Ukrainian law. Under his direction, between 1925 and 1929 scientific articles dedicated to Pavlo Polubotok, abolition of the Statutes of Lithuania, works of O. Lazarevsky, Ukrainian law and history during the 17th and 18th century were published. In 1929 Vasylenko was pressured to resign from his post in the academy. He died on 3 October 1935 in Kyiv.

Academic offices
Preceded by Orest Levytsky	President of NANU; 1921–1922	Succeeded by Orest Levytsky
