= Kiev Theological Academy =

Higher educational institution of the Russian Orthodox Church

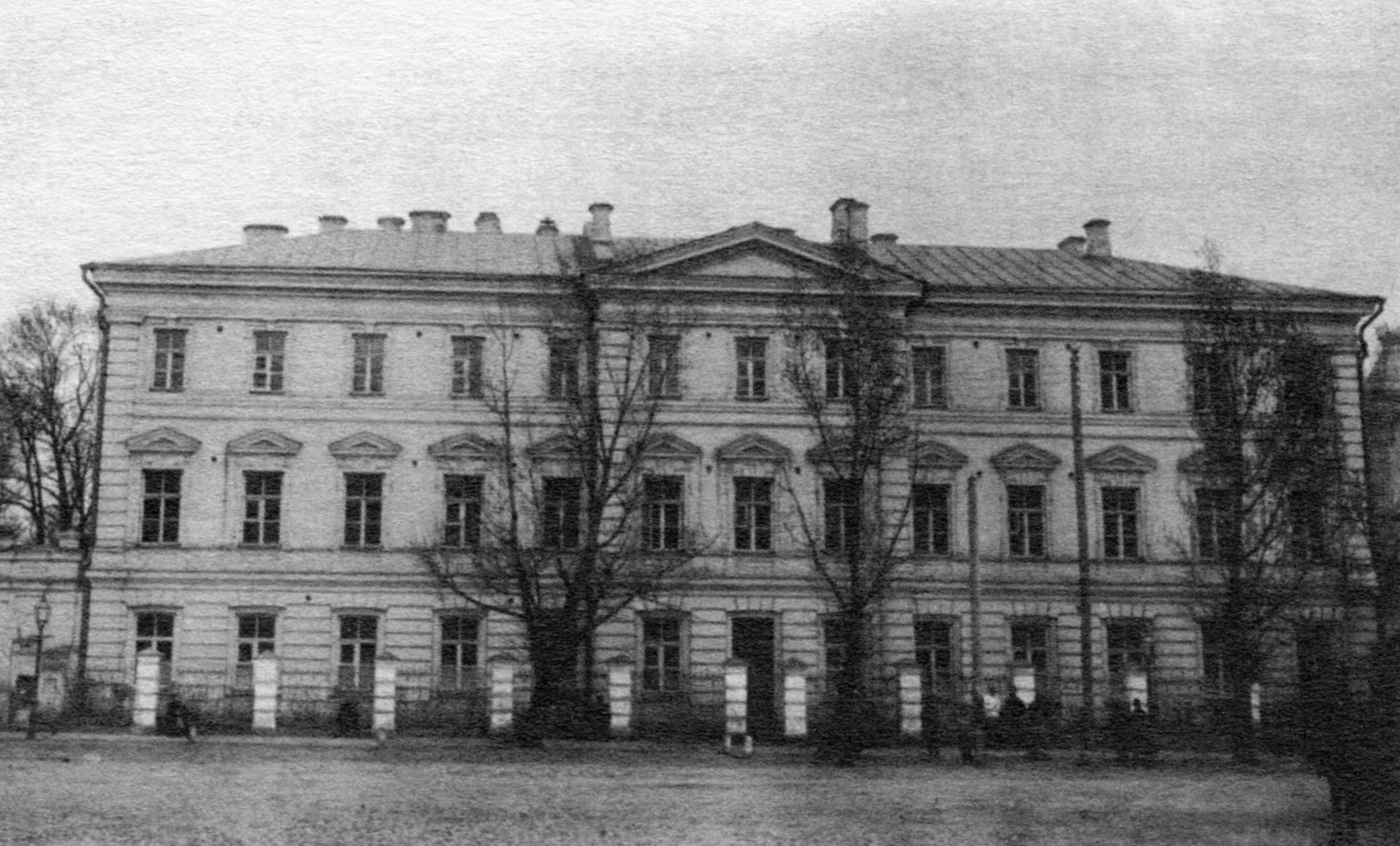
The academy building in the early 1900s

The Kiev Theological Academy (1819–1919) was one of the oldest higher educational institution of the Russian Orthodox Church, situated in Kiev, then in the Russian Empire (now Kyiv, Ukraine). It was considered to be the most senior one among similar academies in Moscow, Saint Petersburg, and Kazan. It was located at the Kiev Podol within the Kiev Epiphany Monastery. The Academy's predecessor was the Academia Mohileana, founded in the 17th century.

== History ==
=== Preceding institutions ===
The Kiev Theological Academy traces its history back to 1615, when Yelisey Pletenetsky founded a school at the Brotherhood Monastery in Kiev. Several decades later, Peter Mohyla, from 1632 an Orthodox Metropolitan of Kiev under the Patriarchate of Constantinople, merged it with a newly established Lavra school into the Mohyla Collegium (Latin: Collegium Kijovense Mohileanum). The Collegium alumni include Innokentiy Gizel, Lazar Baranovych, Dmitry Tuptalo, Stephen Yavorsky, Feofan Prokopovich and many other state activists and Orthodox clerics who helped reform the Russian Orthodox Church under the auspices of Patriarch Nikon and Peter the Great. In 1658 under the terms of the Treaty of Hadiach the Collegium obtained the status of an Academy, similar to Kraków Academy. This was recognized in 1694 by the Russian tsar Ivan V, then reaffirmed by Peter I in 1701, when it became the Mohyla Academy.

=== Theological Academy ===
The Mohyla Academy was closed in 1817 by the decree of Alexander I of Russia. In 1819, the Kiev Theological Academy, an ecclesiastical educational institution, was opened in the Brotherhood Monastery. In contrast to its predecessor, the Mohyla Academy, like all similar establishments in Russia at the time the Kiev Theological Academy admitted sons of clergy only. According to its original statute, the academy was headed by a rector and supervised by a special commission; in 1839 the supervisory functions were transferred to the Most Holy Synod. A new statute, approved in 1869, provision of scientific degrees was delegated to academic councils, and students were divided in three specialized groups. In 1884 that statute was replaced by another one, which delegated supervision over the academy to the Metropolitan of Kyiv. In 1906 temporary rules were adopted, abolishing that supervision and restoring the rights of academic councils.

The Kiev Theological Academy served as the only Orthodox high school of theology in Ukrainian lands. Throughout its existence, the number of students in the establishment stood at around 200. Many of the academy's alumni continued their careers in secular spheres. The academy published a popular magazine and a scientific periodical, and was renowned for its library containing numerous valuable manuscripts and printed works. In 1872 an archaeological society and a museum were established by the academy, headed by Nikolay Petrov. The academy was closed by the Soviet regime in 1920. Upon the closure of the Kiev Theological Academy, its quarters were passed to the Soviet's Red Army Dnieper Flotilla staff headquarters. The main cathedral of the Brotherhood Monastery was destroyed in 1935 by the Soviet authorities.

=== Successors ===
Unofficial courses were organized by the academy following its formal closure. An attempt to open the Kiev Orthodox Theological Academy within the walls of the Kiev Pechersk Lavra was made after the Second World War in 1947. It was situated in Golden-Domed Monastery (1947–1949) and in the stylobate of St Andrew's Church (1949–1960). The academy was revived in 1992 and is currently based on the grounds of the Kiev Pechersk Lavra.

== Current successors ==
Since the 1990s, there have been three educational establishments in Ukraine that claim to be successors to the Kyiv Mohyla Academy:

- the Ukrainian branch of the Russian Orthodox Church operates the Kiev Theological Academy in the Kiev Pechersk Lavra;
- the Orthodox Church of Ukraine has the Kyiv Orthodox Theological Academy in the Golden-Domed Monastery in Kyiv;
- the National University of Kyiv-Mohyla Academy is a secular educational institution.

== Sources ==
- Mitrophan Bozhko. The Kyiv Theological Seminary in 1947–1960: A Brief Introduction to Further Study // Теолошки погледи. — Т. LIII. — №3. — Београд: Свети Архиереjски Синод Српске Православне Цркве, 2020. — С.723–742.
- Митрофан (Божко), ієром. Спроба відкриття Київської православної духовної академії в стінах Києво-Печерської Лаври у 1947 р. // Могилянські читання 2021. Вивчення та збереження культурного надбання: до 95-річчя заснування Національного заповідник «Києво-Печерська лавра». Зб. наук. праць. — К.: Національний заповідник «Києво-Печерська лавра», Видавництво «Фенікс», 2021. — С.60–66 [in Ukrainian].
- Митрофан (Божко), ієром. Київська духовна семінарія 1946–1947 рр.: обставини відкриття та перший навчальний рік // Труди Київської Духовної Академії. — №33. — К.: Київська духовна академія і семінарія, 2020. — С.186–196 [in Ukrainian].
- Митрофан (Божко), архім. Участь викладачів Київської духовної семінарії 1947–1960 рр. у Другій світовій війні // Київ і кияни : матеріали щорічної науково-практичної конференції, м. Київ, 11–12 листопада 2024 р. / відп. ред. А. Сушко; редкол. Т. Водотика, О. Друг, В. Івакін, В. Нахманович, С. Панькова, А. Турчанінов. Київ : Видавничий дім «АДЕФ-Україна», 2024. Вип. 16. С.276–279 [in Ukrainian].
- Митрофан (Божко О.), архім. Особливості структурно-функційної організації духовних семінарій за радянських часів (на прикладі Київської духовної семінарії) // Київські історичні студії. — 2024. — №2 (19). — С.55–63 [in Ukrainian].
- Митрофан (Божко), архім. Викладання богословських дисциплін у Київській духовній семінарії радянської доби (1947–1960 рр.) // Труди Київської Духовної Академії. — №41. — К.: Київська духовна академія і семінарія, 2024. — С.128–159 [in Ukrainian].
- Митрофан (Божко), архім. Навчальний план духовних семінарій з 1946 по 1960 рр.: дореволюційна модель у радянському впровадженні // Церковно-історичний збірник Волинської духовної семінарії. — Випуск 5. — Луцьк: ФОП Мажула Ю. М., 2024. — С.49–56 [in Ukrainian].
- Митрофан (Божко), архім. Рівень кваліфікації педагогічних кадрів Київської духовної семінарії (1947–1960 рр.) // Матеріали IV Міжнародної науково-практичної конференції «Актуальні питання богослов’я та історії Церкви» (до 225-річчя створення Харківської єпархії), 7 листопада 2024 р., м. Харків. — Харків: ХДС, 2025. — С. 36–45 [in Ukrainian].
- Митрофан (Божко), архім. Біблійні дисципліни в освітньому процесі Київської духовної семінарії 1947–1960 рр. // Труди Київської Духовної Академії. — №42. — К.: Київська духовна академія і семінарія, 2025. — С.76–100 [in Ukrainian].
- Митрофан (Божко О.), архім. Покоління як фактор інституційної динаміки: Київська духовна семінарія 1947–1960 рр. // Вісник гуманітарних наук. — 2026. — № 15. DOI: https://doi.org/10.5281/zenodo.18669495 [in Ukrainian].
- Митрофан (Божко), архім. Виміри повсякденного життя радянських семінаристів: випадок Київської духовної семінарії 1947–1960 рр. // Церковно-історичний збірник Волинської духовної семінарії. — Випуск 6. — Луцьк: Надстир’я, 2025. — С.157–169 [in Ukrainian].
- Митрофан (Божко О.), архім. «Хто відповість на Страшному суді?»: Емоції, протест і субординація в Київській Духовній Семінарії 1950-х років (випадок Петра Гончаренка) // Вісник гуманітарних наук. — 2026. — № 17. DOI: https://doi.org/10.5281/zenodo.19412371 [in Ukrainian].
- Митрофан (Божко), архім. Ліквідація Київської духовної семінарії 1960 р.: інституційне згортання та соціальні траєкторії її спільноти // Наукові Записки Богословсько-історичного науково-дослідного центру імені архімандрита Василія (Проніна). — Випуск 12. — Ужгород: РІК-У, 2025. — С. 63–80 [in Ukrainian].
