= Kyiv Archive Museum of Transitional Period =

- (Russian: Музей-архив переходного периода Ukrainian: Музей-Архів Переходової доби)
- Established: April 1942
- Dissolved: October 1942
- Type: National history museum
- Director: Oleksandr Ohloblyn

Kyiv Archive Museum of Transitional Period (Russian: Музей-архив переходного периода, Ukrainian: Музей-Архів Переходової доби) was a propaganda museum whose establishment was sanctioned by Germany on March 26, 1942.

The museum existed from April – October 1942. Its expositions demonstrated "achievements" of the German occupation and crimes of Joseph Stalin's regime. The museum's director was the famous Ukrainian historian Oleksander Ohloblyn who used this opportunity to organize an exhibition about cultural monuments destroyed by Bolsheviks. Several historians, such as Oleksandr Hruzynsky, Svitozar Drahomanov, Natalia Polonska-Vasylenko etc. were as appointed scientific advisors of the museum. Some of the city archive fonds were transferred to the museum.

The museum had about 20 visitors daily and the museum was soon closed.

== Literature ==
- Part 2: From Bolshevism to the New Order: Museum-Archive of the Transitional Period in Kiev, 1942.
- Музей-Архів Переходової доби. К. 2002 (in Ukrainian)
