= Ahatanhel Krymsky =

Ukrainian academic (1871–1942)

- Агатангел Кримський (Ukrainian); Agatangel Krımskiy (Crimean Tatar)
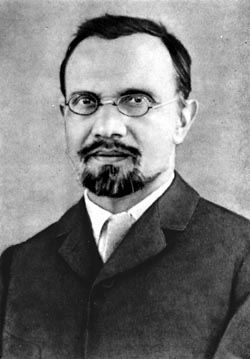
- Born: 15 January [O.S. 3 January] 1871; Volodymyr-Volynskyi, Russian Empire (now Ukraine)
- Died: January 25, 1942 (aged 71); Qostanai, Kazakh SSR, Soviet Union
- Education: Lazarev Institute, Moscow University

Signature
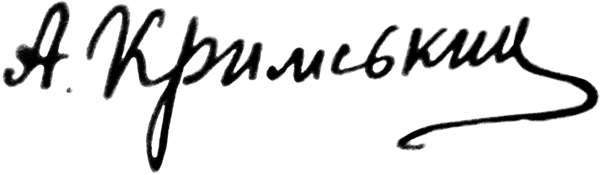

Ahatanhel Yukhymovych Krymsky (Ukrainian: Агатангел Юхимович Кримський, Russian: Агафа́нгел Ефи́мович Кры́мский, romanized: Agafangel Yefimovich Krymsky; Crimean Tatar: Agatangel Krımskiy; 15 January [O.S. 3 January] 1871 – 25 January 1942) was a Ukrainian Orientalist, linguist, polyglot (knowing up to 35 languages), literary scholar, folklorist, writer, and translator. He was one of the founders of the All-Ukrainian Academy of Sciences (VUAN) in 1918 and a full member of it and the Shevchenko Scientific Society from 1903.

Although Krymsky was not ethnically Ukrainian, he described himself as a "Ukrainophile".

In 1941, he was arrested by the Soviet authorities as "Ukrainian nationalist," an "ideologist of Ukrainian nationalists", and a "head of nationalistic underground". He was convicted in "Anti-Soviet nationalistic activities" and imprisoned in Kustanay General Prison No.7 (today near Kostanay, Kazakhstan).

== Life and career ==
Krymsky was born in Volodymyr-Volynskyi to a Tatar father with Belarusian descent and an ethnic Polish mother. In 1915 in interview to the Terciman newspaper, Krymsky identified himself as a Crimean Tatar. His surname "Krymsky" (Belarusian: Крымскі / Krymski, Ukrainian: Кримський) means "Crimean," and was received by an ancestor in the 17th century who was a Crimean Tatar mullah from Bakhchysarai. He was baptized into Eastern Orthodoxy.

His family moved soon to Zvenyhorodka in Central Ukraine.

Krymsky graduated from Galagan College in Kyiv in 1889, from the Lazarev Institute of Oriental Languages in Moscow in 1891, and subsequently from Moscow University in 1896. After graduation, he worked in the Middle East (in what are today Syria and Lebanon) from 1896 to 1898, and subsequently returned to Moscow, where he became a lecturer at the Lazarev Institute, and, in 1900, a professor. Krymsky taught Arabic literature and Oriental history. In Moscow, he was active in the Ukrainian pro-independence movement and was a member of Moscow's Ukrainian Hromada.

In July 1918, Krymsky returned to Kyiv and took part in the foundation of the National Academy of Sciences of Ukraine (VUAN) and its library and served as the first VUAN permanent secretary and de facto director until the Soviet government brought about his defeat in the VUAN elections of 1929. Eventually, he became the director of the academy. He edited 20 of the 25 volumes of Записки Історично-філологічного відділу ("Notes of the History and Philology Department") of the academy (1920–29) and was a professor at Kyiv University, as well as vice-president of the Ukrainian Science Society in Kyiv from 1918.

== Activity ==
Krymsky was an expert in up to 34 languages; some sources report that he had at least an average knowledge of 56 languages. Krymsky contributed several hundred entries to the Brockhaus, Efron, and Granat Russian encyclopedias and wrote many other works on Arabic, Turkish, Turkic, Crimean Tatar, and Iranian history and literature, some of which were pioneering textbooks in Russian Oriental studies.

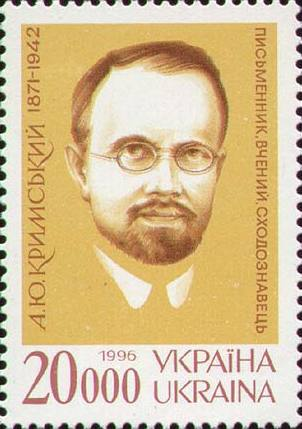
1996 Ukrainian commemorative stamp

In particular he wrote, in Russian, histories of Islam (1904–12); of the Arabs, Turkey, Persia and their literatures, Dervish theosophy, and a study of the Semitic languages and peoples. In the 1920s and 1930s he also wrote in Ukrainian histories of Turkey and Persia and their literatures; monographs on Hafiz and his songs and on the Turkic peoples, their languages, and literatures; and edited a collection of articles on the Crimean Tatars. With O. Boholiubsky he wrote a study of Arab higher education and the Arabian Academy of Sciences. During the last years of his life he wrote a six-volume history of the Khazars, which was never published.

In Kyiv until 1931, under the leadership of Krymsky, the Turkological Commission at the Ukrainian Academy of Sciences published "History of Turkey", "History of Turkey and its Literature", "Introduction to the History of Turkey", "Turks, their language and literature" and others.

Krymsky researched the history of the Ukrainian language. As he was an opponent of Aleksei Sobolevsky's claim that the language of the ancient Kyivan Rus’ was more Russian, than Ukrainian, he wrote three polemical studies from 1904 to 1907 on this question, later his views on the language of the Kyivan Rus were summarized in Українська мова, звідкіля вона взялася і як розвивалася ("The Ukrainian Language: Whence It Came and How It Developed"). Krymsky researched Ukrainian dialects and was actively involved in the work of standardizing the vocabulary and orthography of literary Ukrainian in the 1920s. In this activity he rejected the Galician orthographic tradition. He was the editor of the first two vols of the four-volume Russian-Ukrainian dictionary (1924–33) and of the Russian-Ukrainian dictionary of legal language (1926).

Krymsky wrote three books of lyrical poetry and some novellas, and translated many Arabic and Persian literary works into Ukrainian, including The Rubáiyát of Omar Khayyam, One Thousand and One Nights, and Hafez's songs. He also translated the poetry of European writers such as Heinrich Heine, Byron, Sappho, Friedrich Rückert. He published articles and reviews on Ukrainian writers, their works and on Ukrainian theater.

As an ethnographer, Krymsky was an adherent of migration theory. He translated into Ukrainian and annotated W.A. Clouston's Popular Tales and Fictions (1896) and also wrote many Orientalist works and articles about Ukrainian ethnographers.

== Death ==
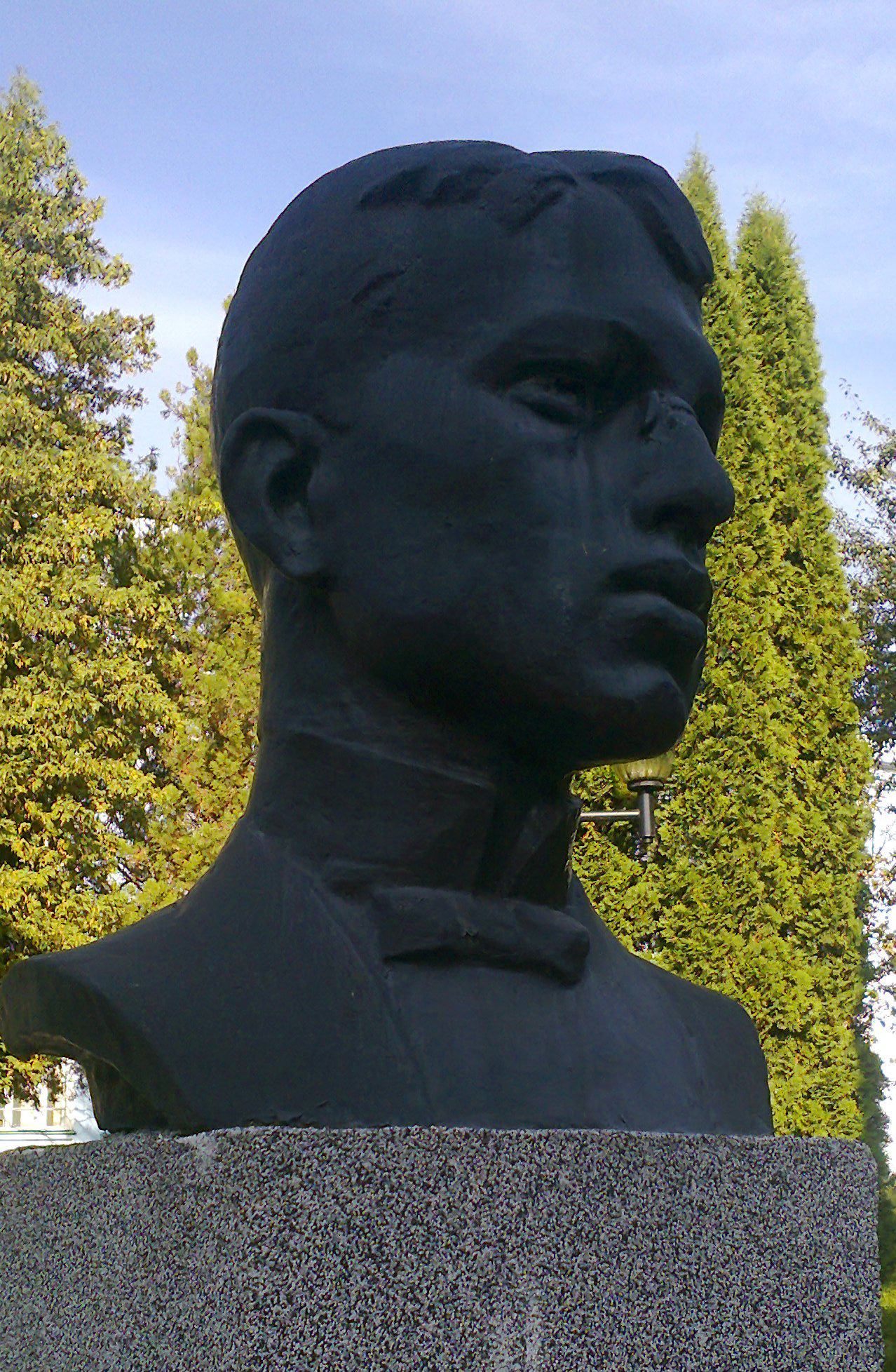
Krymsky's monument in Volodymyr

Although Krymsky survived the Great Purge of the 1930s, he was removed from scholarly and teaching activity for about 10 years. Since 1930, the works of Krymsky were banned and he was forbidden to publish his works. In 1939, he was rehabilitated, but in July 1941 after the German-Soviet war began, the NKVD arrested him as "especially unreliable" on charges of "anti-Soviet nationalistic activities", and imprisoned him in Kostanay General Prison, where he died at the age of 71. Officially, Krymsky died from exhaustion in a prison hospital, but there is a version that he might have died due to cruel torture. His case was finally discontinued in 1957 and he was officially rehabilitated in 1960. Some manuscripts of his works are still unpublished.

== Bibliography ==
- (in Ukrainian) Гурницький, К. Кримський як історик (Київ, 1971)
- Скокан, К.; Деркач, Н.; Ісаєва, Н.; Мартиненко, Г. Агатангел Кримський: Бібліографічний покажчик (1889–1971) (Київ, 1972)
- Білодід, І. Агатангел Кримський — україніст та орієнталіст (Київ, 1974)
- Павличко, С. Націоналізм, сексуальність, орієнталізм: Складний світ Агатангела Кримського (Київ, 2000)
- Бабишкін, О. Агатангел Кримський: літературний портрет (Київ, 1967)
- Епістолярна спадщина А. Кримського К., 2005. – Т. І (1890-1917). 500 с.
- Епістолярна спадщина А. Кримського К., 2006. – Т. ІІ (1918-1941), 359 с.
- Кримський А. Ю. Енциклопедична сходознавча спадщина К.: Інститут сходознавства ім. А. Ю. Кримського НАН України, 2018. – 588 с.
- Агатангел Кримський. Нариси життя і творчості Київ: Інститут сходознавства ім. А. Кримського НАН України; Відп. ред.: Василюк О. Д. та ін. – К.: [Видавничий дім „Стилос”], 2006. – 564 с.: іл.
- Кримський А. Ю. «Історія хазар» К.: Інститут сходознавства ім. А. Ю. Кримського НАН України, 2018. – 216 с.
- А.Ю. Кримський. Бібліографічний покажчик/ Київ: Інститут сходознавства ім. А. Ю. Кримського НАН України 2016. – 276 с.
- Кримський А.Ю. Вибрані сходознавчі праці в п’яти томах. Т. I. Арабістика. К.: Стилос, 2007. – 432 с.
- Кримський А. Ю. Вибрані сходознавчі праці в п’яти томах. Т. II. Тюркологія. К.: Стилос, 2007. – 528 с.
- Кримський А. Ю. Вибрані сходознавчі праці в п’яти томах. Т. ІІІ. Тюркологія. К.: Стилос, 2010. – 416 с.
- Кримський А. Ю. Вибрані сходознавчі праці в п’яти томах. Т. IV. Іраністика. К.: Стилос, 2008. – 388 с.
- Кримський А. Ю. Вибрані сходознавчі праці в п’яти томах. Т. V. Іраністика. З неопублікованих та малодоступних творів А. Кримського”. К.: Стилос, 2010. – 428 с.
- Огнєва О. Д. Агатангел Кримський: учитель та учні. Одеса : Астропринт, 2019. - 32, [2] с.
- Krymsky's works in E-library "Chtyvo"
