= Nataliia Polonska-Vasylenko =

Ukrainian historian (1884–1973)

- Наталія Полонська-Василенко
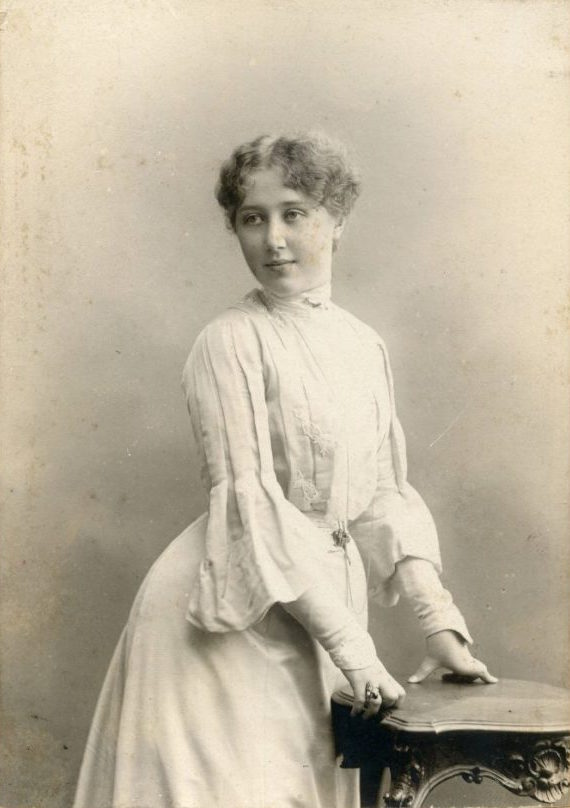
- A picture of Nataliia Polonska-Vasylenko during 1902 by Kozlovsky and Haas.
- Born: Natalia Menshova; 12 February 1884; Kharkiv, Kharkov Governorate, Russian Empire (now Kharkiv, Kharkiv Oblast, Ukraine)
- Died: June 8, 1973 (aged 89); Dornstadt, West Germany
- Spouse(s): Serhiy Polonsky (divorced); Mykola Vasylenko (1923-1935, his death); Oleksandr Morhun (1937-1961, his death)
- Parent: Dmytro Menshov

Academic background
- Education: Kyiv University

Academic work
- Discipline: History of Ukraine
- Institutions: Kyiv University; Ukrainian Free University

Nataliia Polonska-Vasylenko (Ukrainian: Наталія Полонська-Василенко; 2 March [O.S. 19 February] 1884 – 8 June 1973) was one of the foremost Ukrainian historians of the 20th century. She was a wife of the Ukrainian academician of history and statesman Mykola Vasylenko.

== Life and career ==
Polonska-Vasylenko belonged to Russian nobility through her mother, Maria Fyodorovna, who was from Oryol Oblast. Her father was a Russian Imperial officer, Dmytro Menshov (1855–1918), a descendant of Cossack starshyna and a nephew of writer Grigory Danilevsky. Polonska-Vasylenko studied history under Mitrofan Dovnar-Zapolsky at Kyiv University and from 1912 was a member of the Kyiv-based Historical Society of Nestor the Chronicler. From 1916, she was a lecturer at Kyiv University and Director of its archeological museum and was elected a member of Taurida Scientific Archival Commission. During the 1920s, the most liberal years of Soviet rule, she was a professor at the Kyiv Institutes of Geography, Archeology, and Art, and a research associate at the All-Ukrainian Academy of Sciences (VUAN). She witnessed, but survived, the Joseph Stalin purges of the 1930s and was a member of the reorganized and Sovietized academy from 1937 to 1941. In 1940, she received her doctorate and became a professor at Kyiv University. During the German occupation, she directed the Kyiv Central Archive of Old Documents and worked in Kyiv City Administration, was responsible for renaming of streets and consulted Kyiv Archive Museum of Transitional Period (dedicated to achievements of German occupation and crimes of Communists). As the tide of the war turned against the Germans, she fled west, first to Lviv, then to Prague, and finally to Bavaria. She was a professor at the Ukrainian Free University in Prague (1944–45), and moved together with this institution to Munich, where she continued to teach until her death in 1973. In the 1960s, she took an active part in the establishment of the American-Based Ukrainian Historical Association and was its vice-president from 1965.

== Personal life ==
Her first husband Serhiy Polonsky was an army poruchik, whose demands for Nataliia to abandon her career in Kyiv and move to Zhytomyr eventually caused their marriage to disintegrate after eight years. Later, she had an affair with professor Mitrofan Dovnar-Zapolsky, but parted with him after he was dispatched to Baku.

After the Revolution of 1917 Polonska-Vasylenko moved from Moscow to Kyiv. She refused to leave the city following the arrival of Bolsheviks, despite famine, numerous epidemics and mass arrests by the new authorities. Throughout 1920, Polonska-Vasylenko survived Spanish flu, typhus and endocarditis.

In 1923 Polonska Vasylenko married Mykola Vasylenko, her former gymnasium teacher and president of the Ukrainian Academy of Sciences. She contributed to his liberation from imprisonment after arrest. Two years after Vasylenko's death she married the economist Oleksandr Morhun. After fleeing from the advance of the Red Army on Kyiv in 1943, the couple settled in Trasfelden, Bavaria in 1945. Following the death of her third husband in 1961, Polonska-Vasylenko lived in a retirement home in Dornstadt, West Germany.

== Writings ==
Polonska-Vasylenko was a specialist in Ukrainian archeology, the history of Kyivan Rus', the later history of the Zaporozhian Cossacks, and the history of her own times. She also wrote extensively on modern Ukrainian historiography.

Before the First World War, she participated in the compilation and writing of a large Russian cultural history atlas which was published in three volumes between 1913 and 1914. During the 1920s, she published extensively in the various periodicals of the Ukrainian Academy on the Zaporozhian Cossacks and the transformation and absorption of southern Ukraine into the Russian Empire during the reigns of Catherine the Great and her predecessors.

During the Cold War, deprived of the use of the archives of her native land, Polonska-Vasylenko collected and reprinted many of her earlier studies on Zaporozhia (1965–67), wrote several memoirs of intellectual life in revolutionary and Soviet Ukraine including a history of the Ukrainian Academy of Sciences (2 vols. 1955–1958), published a book on the Stalin repressions of Ukrainian historians (1962), and turned increasingly toward synthesis, at the end of her career, publishing a volume on Ukrainian historiography (1971), and a two volume general history of Ukraine (1973–1976).

In her general approach to Ukrainian history, Polonska-Vasylenko followed the lead of her distinguished émigré predecessor, Dmytro Doroshenko, and wrote in a conservative vain, stressing the importance of the Cossack officer class and the Ukrainian gentry into which they were later transformed. She saw the strivings of this class for national unity and independence, or, at least, autonomy, as one of the main currents of Ukrainian history, and she characterized the nineteenth century as a time of Russian and Austrian occupation. She ended her general history with the advent of Soviet rule.

== Legacy ==
Through her teaching at the Ukrainian Free University and her many publications, Polonska-Vasylenko influenced several younger Ukrainian historians in the west, especially the founder of the Ukrainian Historical Association, Lubomyr Wynar. After the proclamation of Ukrainian independence in 1991 and the subsequent growth of intellectual freedom, her major works, including her history of the Ukrainian Academy and her general history of Ukraine were reprinted in her homeland where she finally became widely known.

== Bibliography ==
- Nataliia Polonska-Vasylenko, "The Settlement of Southern Ukraine (1750-1775)," Annals of the Ukrainian Academy of Arts and Sciences in the US, IV-V (1955).
- Idem, Two Conceptions of the History of Ukraine and Russia (New York, 1968).
- Idem, Ukraine-Rus' and Western Europe in the 10th-13th Centuries (New York, 1964).
- Nataliia Polonska-Vasylenko, History of Ukraine. In 2 Volumes 1995. Available online in Ukrainian. Also published in an abridged German edition.
