= Anatoliy Zahorodniy =

Ukrainian physicist (born 1951)

- Анатолій Загородній
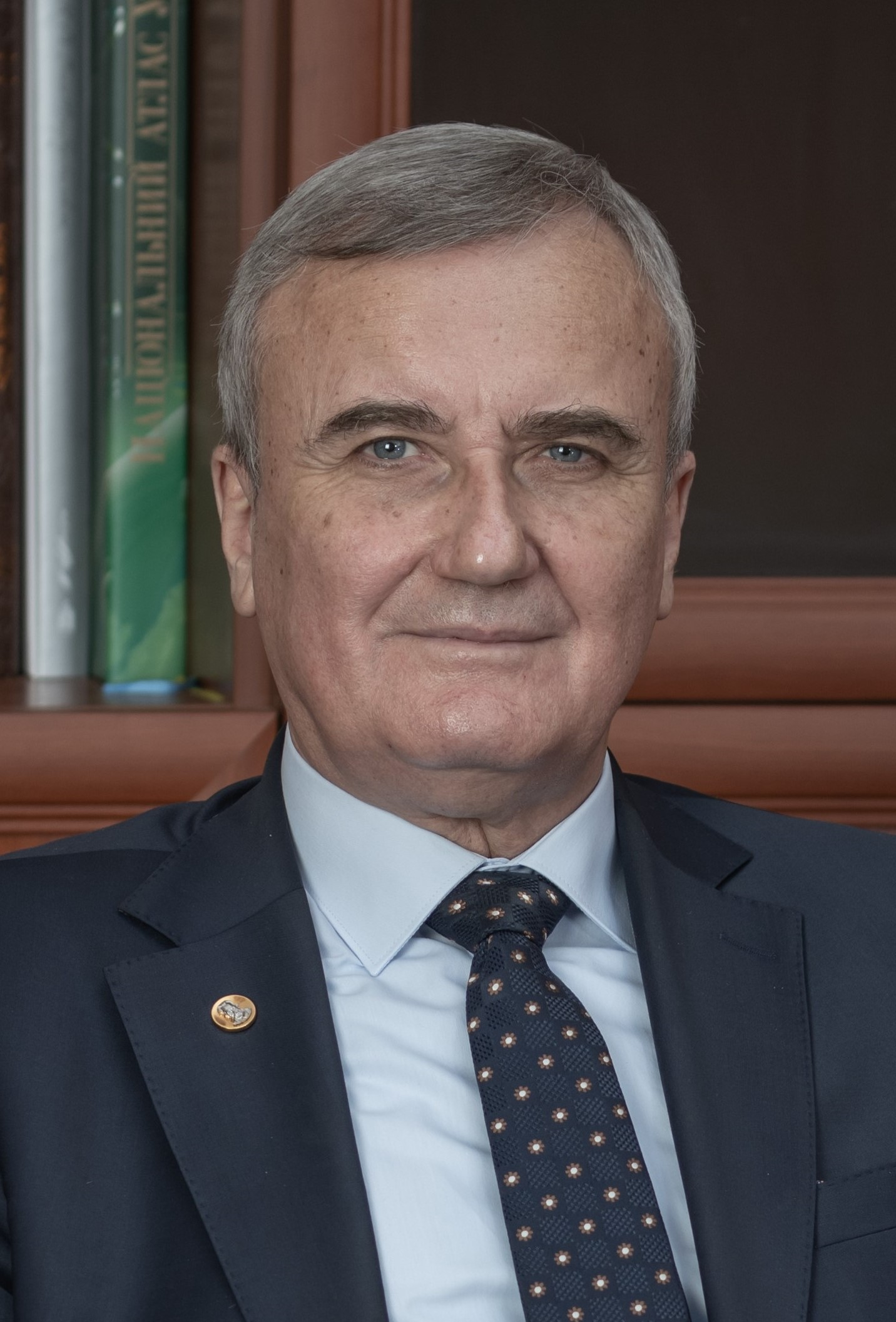
- Zahorodniy in 2020
- Born: 29 January 1951 (age 75); Velyka Bahachka, Ukrainian SSR, Soviet Union (now Ukraine)
- Education: Kharkiv University (MS, 1972)
- Scientific career
- Fields: theoretical physics; plasma physics
- Workplaces: Nikolay Bogolyubov Institute of Theoretical Physics; National Academy of Sciences of Ukraine

Anatoliy Hlibovych Zahorodniy (Ukrainian: Анатолій Глібович Загородній; born 29 January 1951) is a Ukrainian theoretical physicist and an organizer of science; an academician of NANU (since 2006), Vice President (2011–2020) and President of the National Academy of Sciences of Ukraine (since October 2020). Director of Nikolay Bogolyubov Institute of Theoretical Physics of the NAS of Ukraine (since 2002). Doctor of Physical and Mathematical Sciences (1990), Professor (1998), Laureate of the State Prize of Ukraine in Science and Technology (2005), Honored Worker of Science and Technology of Ukraine (2012). He has been a Member of the National Security and Defense Council of Ukraine (since January 20, 2021).

== Biography ==
Zahorodniy was born on January 29, 1951, in Velyka Bahachka, Ukraine.

In 1972, he graduated from the Faculty of Radiophysics, Kharkiv State University (now V.N. Karazin Kharkiv National University). In 1978, he defended his Candidate of Sciences dissertation "Fluctuations and emission spectra of bounded plasma" and received the degree of Candidate of Physical and Mathematical Sciences in "Theoretical Physics". In 1990, he defended his dissertation (Dr. of Sci. degree) on "Electromagnetic fluctuations in limited plasma-molecular systems" and received a doctorate in Physics and Mathematics in "Plasma Physics".

From 1972 onwards, he has been at the Nikolay Bogolyubov Institute of Theoretical Physics of the NAS of Ukraine. From 1980 to 1988, he was scientific secretary. From 1989 to 2002, he was deputy director for research. From 1996 to 2016, he was head of the Department of Theory and Modeling of Plasma Processes. From 2003, he has been the director.

In 1997, he was elected a Corresponding member of the National Academy of Sciences of Ukraine, in the section "Theoretical Physics, Plasma Physics"; in 1998, he was awarded the Academic title of Professor. In 2006, he was elected an Academician of the National Academy of Sciences of Ukraine. From 2009 to 2011, he was its Chief Scientific Secretary; from 2011 to 2020, Vice President, and from 2020 onwards, he has been President of the National Academy of Sciences of Ukraine. During his time as President, on 28 September 2026, the Academy's historic Presidium headquarters in Kyiv was bombed by a Russian attack drone, causing a serious explosion and subsequent fire, killing at least one person and injuring at least three. He stated that the attack happened while many members of staff were inside the building, adding: "We are not connected with the military. This is an attack on science. It is terrorism."

== Scientific contribution ==
His scientific works are devoted to the problems of theoretical and mathematical physics, plasma theory, statistical physics, and physics of kinetic phenomena.

Together with Ivan Yakymenko and Yuri Klimontovych, he developed a statistical theory of spatially bounded plasma-molecular systems, on the basis of which he investigated the influence of the interaction of plasma and molecular subsystems on electromagnetic fluctuations in such systems. He obtained new kinetic equations for the distribution functions of free and bound charged particles in bounded plasma-molecular media, established the explicit form of collision integrals, and investigated the influence of boundary surfaces on the distributions of electrons, ions, and molecules near the medium boundary. He developed the theory of bremsstrahlung in plasma-molecular systems, which takes into account all possible scattering processes involving charged particles and molecules, as well as the scattering of electrons and molecules by collective fluctuations.

In the 1980s and 1990s, together with Oleksiy Sytenko, he generalized the theory of fluctuations in a stable stationary plasma to the case of turbulent plasma with diffusion-drift motions of the liquid type. Calculated the dynamic form factors of such a plasma, investigated their features associated with large-scale turbulent motions in such a plasma. Within the developed approach, he proposed a model of non-Markov diffusion of particles in turbulent plasma.

Further research was aimed at the kinetic description of dusty plasma and the development of the theory of electromagnetic fluctuations in such plasma, taking into account the self-consistent formation of the dynamic charge of powders.

He developed the kinetic theory of dusty plasma. On the basis of the first principles of statistical mechanics, he derived microscopic equations and a chain of Bogolyubov equations for dusty plasma, which made it possible to explain a wide class of new physical phenomena. In particular, he proposed a kinetic approach to the calculation of the effective interaction potentials of powders in plasma and applied it to the study of shielded potentials in weakly ionized plasma, including in the presence of external fields. He found that charging the powders with plasma currents [absent in the source] leads to their decryption, i.e., to the appearance of the Coulomb asymptotics of the effective potential. It has also been shown that the specific polarization of the plasma near the moving powder can lead to a significant reduction in the coefficient of friction and even a change in its sign (negative friction).

He developed the theory of electromagnetic fluctuations in powdered weakly ionized plasma, taking into account the dynamic charging of powders with plasma currents. Proposed general relations for the dielectric response function of dusty plasma and fluctuation currents.
