= Fedir Lyzohub =

Ukrainian and Russian statesman and displomat

- Федір Лизогуб
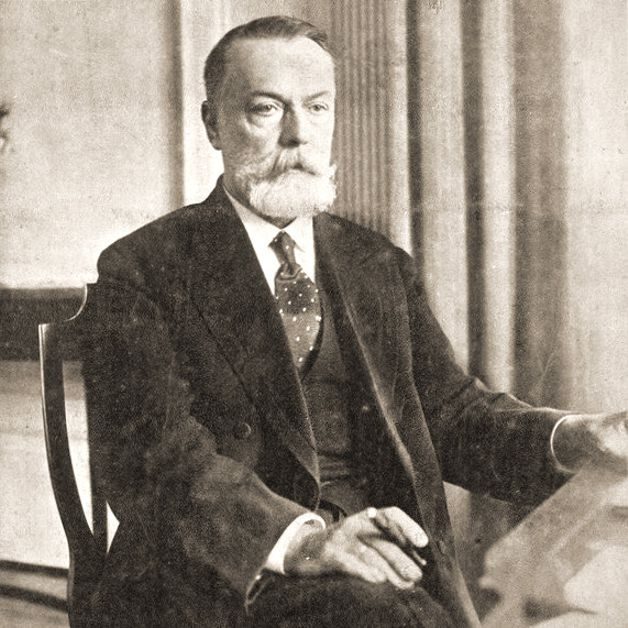
- Lyzohub in 1918

Chairman of Poltava Governorate Land Administration
- In office 1901–1915

Otaman of Council of Ministers
- In office 10 May 1918 – 14 November 1918
- Monarch: Pavlo Skoropadskyi
- Preceded by: Mykola Vasylenko (acting)
- Succeeded by: Sergei Gerbel

Minister of Internal Affairs of Ukraine
- In office 3 May 1918 – 8 July 1918
- Prime Minister: Mykola Sakhno-Ustymovych (acting)
- Preceded by: Mykhailo Tkachenko
- Succeeded by: Ihor Kistiakovsky

Personal details
- Born: October 6, 1851 Sedniv, Chernigov Governorate, Russian Empire
- Died: 1928 (aged 76–77) Belgrade, Kingdom of Yugoslavia
- Party: Union of October 17
- Spouse: Aleksandra Fedorovna Levits
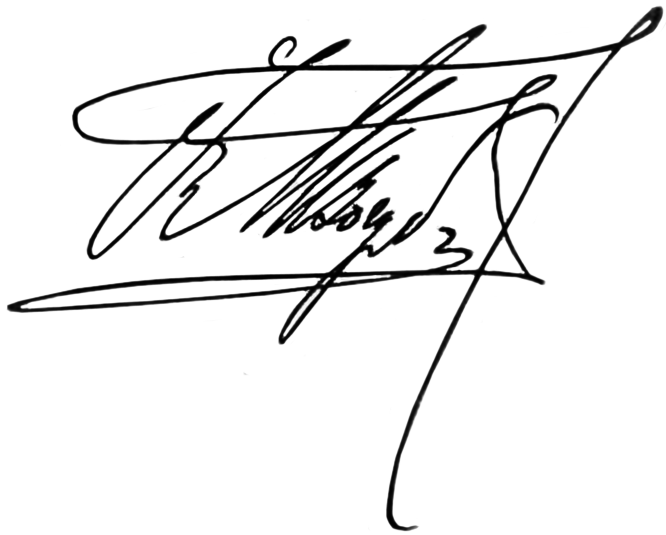
- Signature

Fedir Andriyovych Lyzohub (Ukrainian: Федір Андрійович Лизогуб; Russian: Фёдор Андреевич Лизогуб, romanized: Fyodor Andreevich Lizogub; 1851 — 1928) was a Ukrainian public and state figure, politician and the Otaman of Council of Ministers (Ukrainian State) in 1918. In 1917 he headed department of Foreign Subjects at the Ministry of Foreign Affairs of the Russian Republic.

== Biography ==
He was the son of Nadezhda Dmitrievna Dunin-Borkowska and Andriy Ivanovych Lyzohub, a poet and a friend of Taras Shevchenko.

Fedir Lyzohub founded the Poltava Museum of Regional Studies, ensured that the Poltava administration building was built in the Ukrainian style, and installed a monument to Ivan Kotlyarevsky in Poltava. He also financially supported the Mykola Hohol School of Visual Arts in Myrhorod (Ukrainian: Школа художнього промислу ім. М.Гоголя).

On 19 August 1918 Lyzohub gave interview to German newspaper Berliner Tageblatt und Handels-Zeitung as Minister-President Lyzogub.

In 8–14 November 1918 along with Skoropadsky, Lyzohub participated in secret negotiations with the Russian Grand Duke Nicholas Nikolaevich of Russia in Crimea. Negotiations were taking place at the Dulber Palace in Koreiz (Crimean Southern Coast). In his absence, plenary sessions of government were chaired by Minister of Finance Anton Rzhepetsky. Talks about the Lyzohub's resignation appeared already on 11 November 1918 that were originated by Ukrainian activist Yevhen Chykalenko, according to whom three ministers Lyzohub, Rzhepetsky and Rohoza have resigned.

The Minister of Internal Affairs in the Lyzohub government Viktor Reinbot in his memoirs has explained the situation as following: "Soon Premier Lyzohub departed for Odessa to adjust relations with the High Command of the Austria-Hungary and for negotiations with the Crimea, with which obviously groundlessly was instigated unnecessary customs war. In Odessa it was expected to arrange a conference about the "Southern Alliance" of Ukraine, Don, Kuban, and Terek".

That trip was crucially needed due to change of political situation in Europe with the end of the World War I. The military occupation of Ukraine by armed forces of the Central Powers was nearing the end. The military commandant of Austria-Hungary in Odessa field marshal Eduard Edler von Böltz committed suicide when he found out that Austria-Hungary lost the war. At the same time field marshal Alfred Krauß who led the Austrian Ost-Armee (East Army) left earlier for homeland.

== Family ==
Fedir Lyzohub was a distant descendant of Yakiv Lyzohub who was the acting Hetman of the Zaporizhian Host after the death of Danylo Apostol.

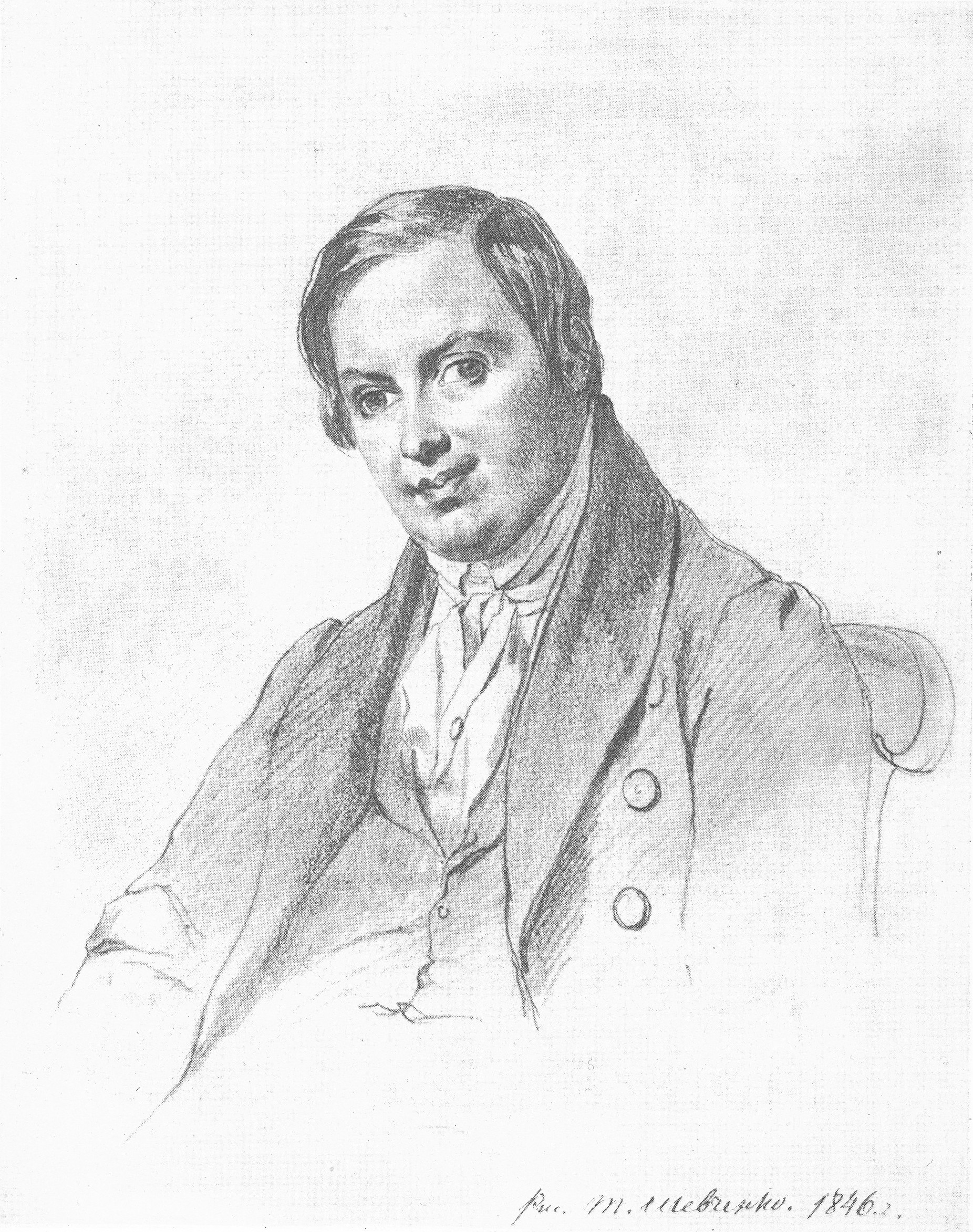
Portrait of Andriy Lyzohub, by Shevchenko, 1846

He had two brothers, Dmytro and Illya (who was married to Sofia Barshevska).

Fedir Lyzohub had four daughters (Olena, 1890; Lysaveta, 1892; Vira, 1897; Sofia, 1900).

== See also ==
- Lyzohub Government, the longest serving governments of Ukraine in 1917–1920
