= National Academy of Sciences of Ukraine =

Academy of sciences

National Academy of Sciences of Ukraine Національна академія наук України
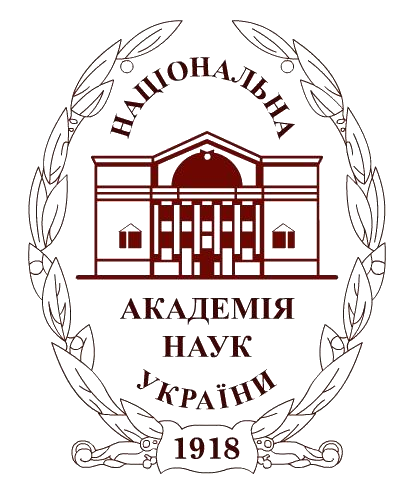
- Formation: November 27, 1918 (official date and the first General Assembly) November 14, 1918 (signing of the law by the Hetman of Ukraine)
- Headquarters: Kyiv, Ukraine
- Chairman: Anatoliy Zahorodniy
- Website: www.nas.gov.ua (in Ukrainian)

The National Academy of Sciences of Ukraine (NASU; Ukrainian: Національна академія наук України, romanized: Natsionalna akademiia nauk Ukrainy, pronounced [nɐts⁽ʲ⁾ioˈnɑlʲnɐ ɐkɐˈdɛmijɐ nɐˈuk ʊkrɐˈjinɪ]; abbr. NAN Ukrainy) is a self-governing state-funded organization in Ukraine that is the main center of development of science and technology by coordinating a system of research institutes in the country. It is the main research-oriented organization, along with the five other academies in Ukraine, specialized in various scientific disciplines. NAS Ukraine consists of numerous departments, sections, research institutes, scientific centers and various other supporting scientific organizations.

The NASU reports annually to the Cabinet of Ministers of Ukraine. The headquarters of the academy is located at Volodymyrska Street in Kyiv. From 1919 until 1991, the academy was a branch of the Academy of Sciences of the Soviet Union.

== Names ==
Over its history, the NAS Ukraine has had these five names.

Names for the Academy	Native language	dates
Ukrainian Academy of Sciences	Українська академія наук	1918–1921
All-Ukrainian Academy of Sciences	Всеукраїнська академія наук	1921–1936
Academy of Sciences of the UkrSSR	Академія наук Української РСР	1936–1991
Academy of Sciences of Ukraine	Академія наук України	1991–1994
National Academy of Sciences of Ukraine	Національна академія наук України	1994–

== History ==
=== Establishment of the Academy ===
The predecessors of the Ukrainian Academy of Sciences were the Ukrainian Scientific Society in Kyiv, which, due to various circumstances did not develop into a national academy, and the Shevchenko Scientific Society in Lemberg (modern Lviv).

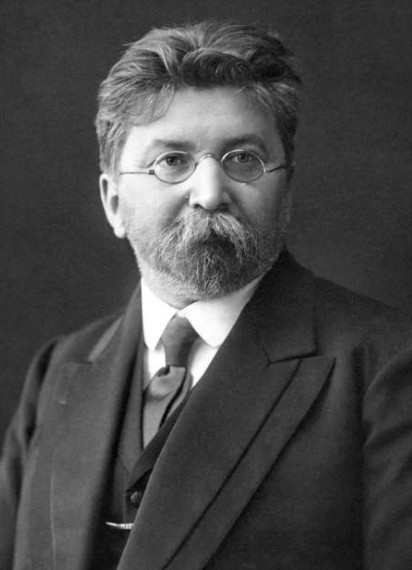
Mykola Vasylenko, Minister of Education and Arts

The initiative to create the institution came from the Ukrainian Science Society in April 1917, eight months before the beginning of the Soviet-Ukrainian War. The institution materialized during the time of the first Ukrainian State, when Mykola Vasylenko, at that time the Minister of Education and Arts, proposed the formation of a special commission. Led by Volodymyr Vernadskyi, an academic of the Russian Academy of Sciences, the commission produced a bill for the creation of a Ukrainian Academy of Science in Kyiv, a National Library, a National Museum, and other scientific institutions. At the end of June 1918, the creation of the Academy was raised at the Ukrainian Science Society Extraordinary General Assembly. By 17 September, a bill for the creation of the Academy had been written, and the statute drafted. On 14 November 1918, the Ukrainian Academy of Sciences was established in law. and also approved the UAS statute, the UAS staff and its institutions and the order of the Ministry of National Education about appointing the first 12 full members (academicians) of the UAS.

According to its original statute, the Academy consisted of three research departments covering history and philology (first department), physics and mathematics (second department), as well as social studies (third department). Its structural units became permanent commissions and institutes. There were planned 15 institutes, 14 permanent commissions, six museums, two offices, two laboratories, botanical and acclimatization gardens, an astronomical observatory, a biology station, a printing house, and a national library. All publications of the academy were to be printed in Ukrainian. Its statute emphasized the all-Ukrainian nature: the members could be not only citizens of the Ukrainian State, but also Ukrainian scientists of West Ukraine (at that time citizens of Austria-Hungary). Foreigners could become academicians as well, but with the resolution of 2/3 of the active members' composition.

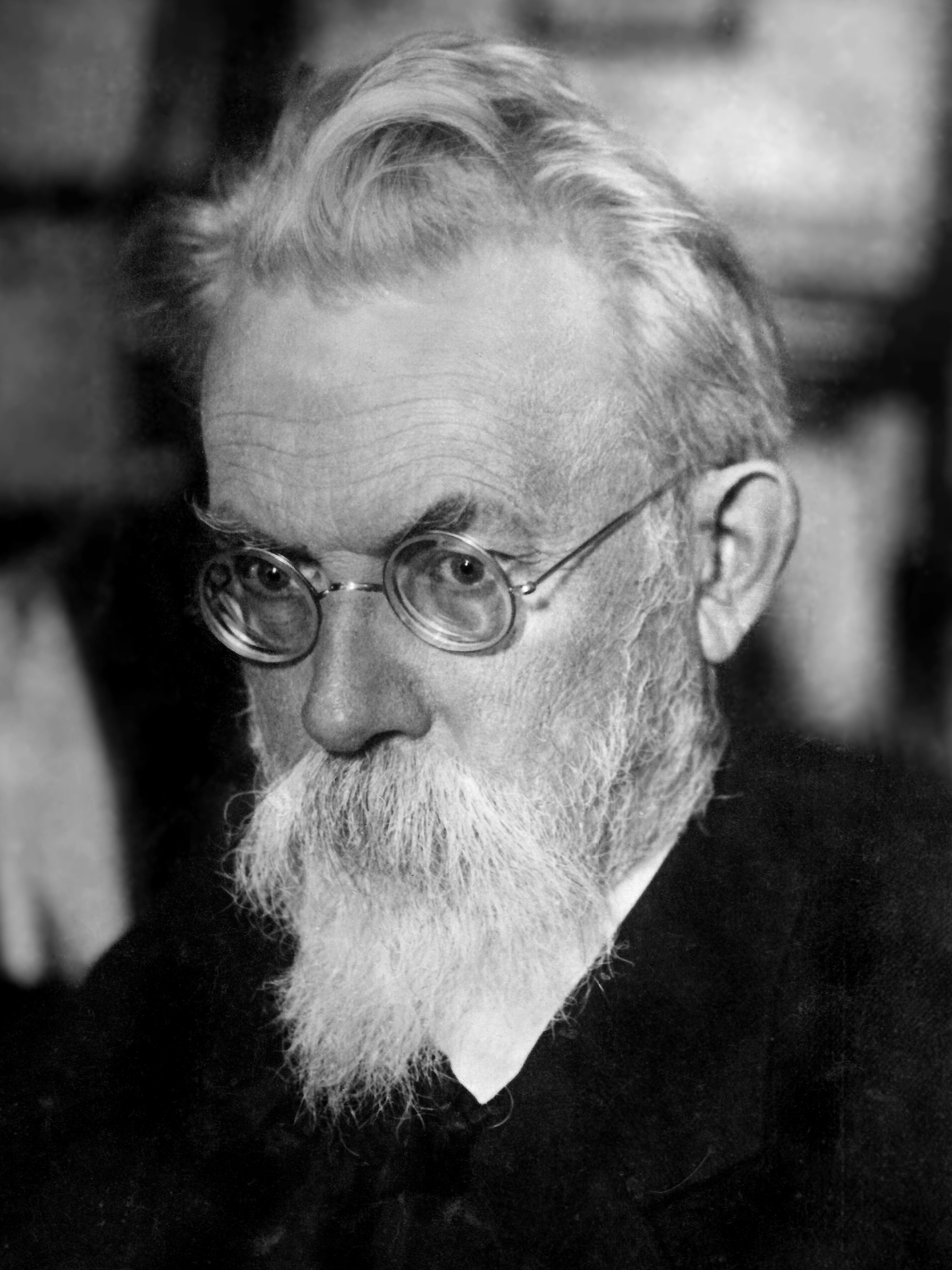
Volodymyr Vernadskyi

The presidium of the newly created academy and its first academicians (three for each department) were appointed by the Ukrainian government, while the future members were expected to be elected by those academicians (as active members). Among the first academicians were historians Dmytro Bahaliy and Orest Levytsky, economists Mykhailo Tuhan-Baranovsky and Volodymyr Kosynsky, eastern studies Ahathanhel Krymsky and Nikolai Petrov, linguist Stepan Smal-Stotsky, geologists Volodymyr Vernadsky and Pavlo Tutkovsky, biologist Mykola Kashchenko, mechanic Stepan Tymoshenko, law studies Fedir Taranovsky. For the post of the president of the Academy, the Hetman of Ukraine (head of state) Pavlo Skoropadsky invited Mykhailo Hrushevsky, who at that time was the president of the Ukrainian Science Society and before World War I served as the president of the Shevchenko Scientific Society in Lemberg, neighboring Austria-Hungary. Hrushevsky declined the invitation, yet later (sometime after 1923), he became a major figure in the Ukrainian Academy of Science (UAS) in Kyiv.

The Academy started official operations at the end of November 1918 with several sessions of the General Assembly and assemblies of its departments. At the first General Assembly (Constituent) that took place on 27 November 1918, academician Volodymyr Vernadsky was elected the President of the Academy, while the permanent secretary became Ahathanhel Krymsky. On the same day, at the sessions of the 2nd and the 3rd departments, Mykola Kashchenko and Mykhailo Tuhan-Baranovsky were elected as chairmen, respectively. On 8 December 1918, the chairman of the 1st department was elected Dmytro Bahaliy. All appointments were approved by Hetman Skoropadskyi.

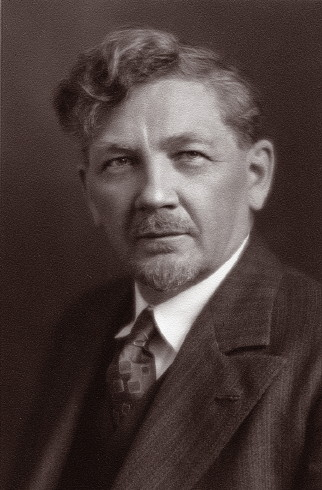
Stepan Tymoshenko

The first institutions of the UAS established in December 1918 were such commissions:

- for compilation of a historic and geographic dictionary of the Ukrainian land (director Dmytro Bahaliy)
- for compilation of a historic dictionary of the Ukrainian language (director Yevhen Tymchenko)
- for compilation of the Ukrainian living language dictionary (director Ahathanhel Krymsky)
- for publishing landmarks of the modern Ukrainian script (director Serhiy Yefremov)
- (archaeographic commission) for publishing landmarks of language, script and history (director Vasyl Danylevych)
- acclimatization garden (director Mykhailo Kashchenko)
- Institute of technical mechanics (director Stepan Tymoshenko)
- Institute of geodesy, institute of economic conjuncture and national economy of Ukraine (director Mykhailo Tuhan-Baranovsky)

The next month, the following commissions were added:

- Institute of demography
- in research of common law (director Orest Levytsky)
- in research of social issues (director Mykhailo Tuhan-Baranovsky)
- in research of national economy (director Volodymyr Kosynsky)

=== First years ===
In its early years, the academy operated during the period of political instability and economic ruin (Ukrainian–Soviet War, Russian Civil War, Polish–Soviet War). The leadership of the Ukrainian Academy of Sciences sought its recognition by each new power and principally emphasized the non-political background of the main science center. Despite the financial hardship, famine, arrests, and emigration of some of its members, the UAS has not only survived as an institution, but developed its structure and directions of research, and began to prepare for publication its scientific works.

On 3 January 1919, the Direktoria of the Ukrainian People's Republic adopted legislative changes to the UAS statute, according to which provisions were made concerning printing of works in Ukrainian and foreign languages (the volume of publications in foreign languages should not exceed 1/4 of the amount in the Ukrainian language), all the UAS officials had to freely possess the Ukrainian language, and full members, upon their approval, would swear in allegiance to the Ukrainian People's Republic. The Supreme power also retained the right to approve the newly elected members at the UAS General Assembly.

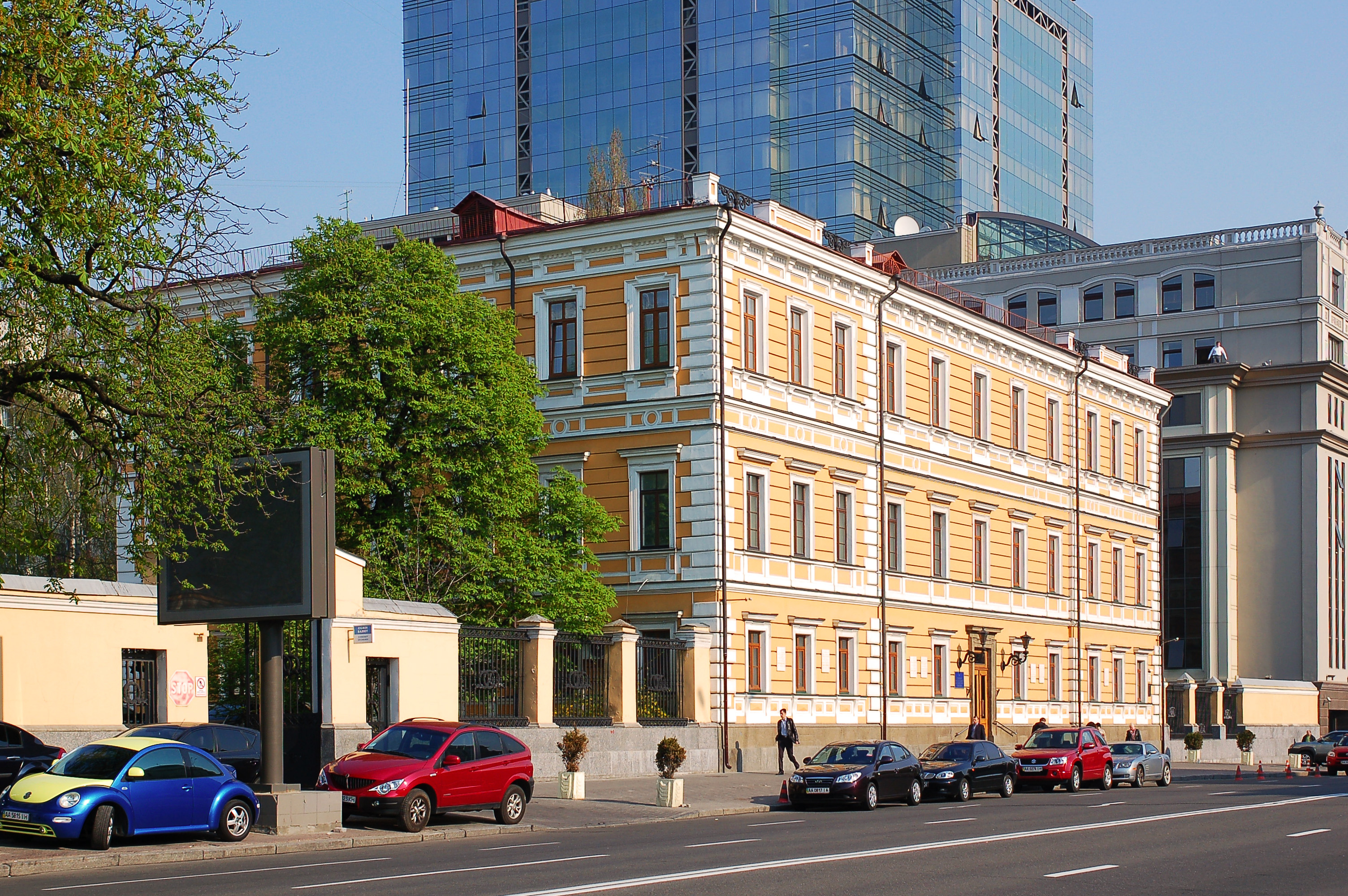
Presidium building of the National Academy of Sciences of Ukraine, former boarding house of Countess Levashova

Following the occupation of Kyiv by Bolshevik forces, on 11 February 1919 the Ukrainian Academy of Sciences received as its own property the mansion and former boarding house of Countess Levashova. This happened on the order of People's Commissar of Education of the Ukrainian Socialist Soviet Republic, Volodymyr Zatonskyi. The next day, on 12 February 1919, an extraordinary UAS General Assembly took place, during which Ahatanhel Krymsky passed on the order of Zatonskyi to immediately start the work. Since the late 1920s, in the Soviet historiography that day was considered the date of establishment of the Academy of Sciences, instead of 14 November 1918, when Hetman Skoropadskyi signed the law on the creation of the Academy.

=== All-Ukrainian Academy of Sciences ===
After several changes of power and the withdrawal of Denikin's forces in December 1919, the Bolsheviks permanently established themselves in Kyiv. With the second arrival of the Bolsheviks, Vernadsky resigned. Orest Levytsky was elected President of the Academy for the next couple of years. In 1921, Levytsky was replaced by the newly elected Mykola Vasylenko; however, he was not approved by the authorities and soon was replaced with Levytsky. Vasylenko himself was arrested in 1923 and convicted (later released on amnesty).

On June 14, 1921, the Council of People's Commissars of Ukrainian SSR adopted a decree "Resolution on the Ukrainian Academy of Sciences", according to which the Academy was recognized as the highest scientific state institution and subordinated to the Narkom of Education. The Academy was renamed from UAS to VUAN (Ukrainian: ВУАН) – All-Ukrainian Academy of Sciences – underlining its importance for Ukrainian territories under Poland, Romania, Czechoslovakia and declaring its intentions to unite within one organization the scientific intelligentsia of all Ukrainian lands. The relationship between members of VUAN and the Soviet authorities soured, while the relationships with the Ukrainian scientists abroad had completely ceased. After historian Orest Levytsky, botanist Volodymyr Lypsky became president of the Academy. Between 1919 and 1930, 103 academicians were elected to the Academy. In 1924-25, the Academy held its first election for foreign members. However, none of the candidates were approved by the Narkom of Education.

Between 1927 and 1930, the takeover of the Academy by the Soviet authorities was completed. Mykhailo Hrushevsky had been a candidate for the presidency, but by the end of 1927 Hrushevsky's candidacy was no longer supported by the authorities. He had been considered a counterweight to the "constitutional-democratic" faction led by Serhiy Yefremov and Ahatanhel Krymsky, but the three of them had actually agreed on opposing state interference. The authorities removed Yefremov and his supporters and dropped all support for Hrushevsky, who was arrested in 1931, taken to Moscow, and never returned to Ukraine. Danylo Zabolotny, a microbiologist, was instead put up as president of the Academy, followed by Oleksandr Bohomolets in 1930.

Repressions against the Academy reached their peak in 1933-1934 and were conducted under the leadership of Pavel Postyshev. Numerous academicians were imprisoned, exiled, and deprived of their titles. According to Natalia Polonska-Vasylenko, during the 1930s over 250 members of the Academy became victims of persecution. Humanitarian sciences were hit especially hard. From that time on, technical sciences became the Academy's main focus point. In 1934 it was directly subordinated to the Council of People's Commissars of Soviet Ukraine, and in 1936 was deprived of its national status and renamed to the Academy of Sciences of the Ukrainian SSR.

=== Second World War ===
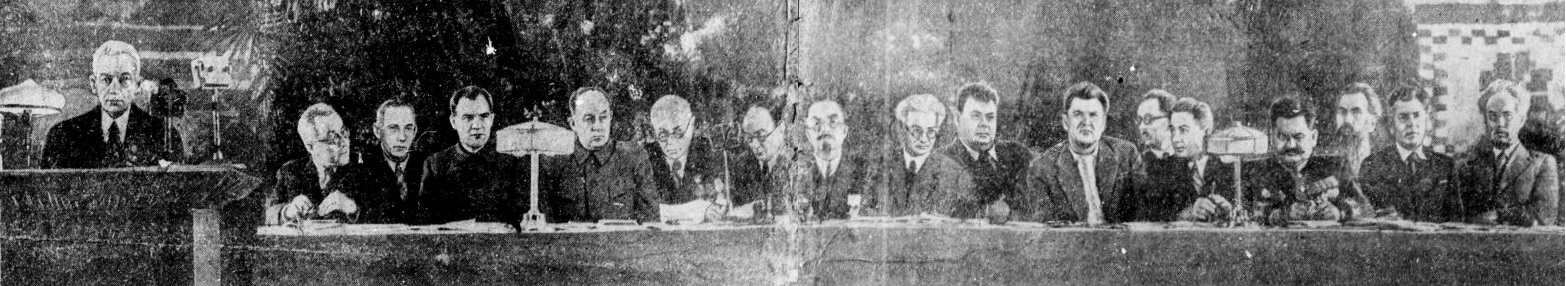
On the 25th anniversary of the Ukrainian SSR Academy in Kyiv, 1944

After the Soviet annexation of Galicia and Volhynia, in 1940 the property of local branches of the Shevchenko Scientific Society was transferred to the Academy of Sciences of the USSR. After the start of German-Soviet War in 1941 the Academy was evacuated from Kyiv to Ufa and then to Moscow.

The non-Soviet Ukrainian Academy of Sciences renewed its activities soon after the capture of Kyiv by German troops in 1941, electing its presidium and management. It organized weekly scientific lectures and seminars on various topics. Among the questions discussed by the academy under German occupation was the possible adoption of Latin alphabet for the Ukrainian language which, was to replace Cyrillic. However, the Academy failed to restore its activities due to opposition from German occupying authorities, which greatly damaged its funds.

=== Postwar years ===
The Academy of Sciences of the Ukrainian SSR returned to Kyiv in 1944. In 1946 it was headed by Oleksandr Palladin. According to a decree of the Central Committee of the Communist Party of the Soviet Union, in 1963 the Academy was subjected to the Academy of Sciences of the Soviet Union and de facto turned into its filial. As a result of Russification, during the 1970s the majority of the academy's publications were issued in the Russian language.

=== 2026 Russian bombing ===
At around 1.30 pm local time on 28 September 2026, the Academy's historic Presidium headquarters in Kyiv was bombed by a Russian Geran-5 attack drone, causing a fire. At least one person was killed and three wounded, according to Vitali Klitschko, the mayor of Kyiv. The fire meant that occupants had to climb out of windows on the upper floors to escape, with firefighters helping people to evacuate the building through the windows as black smoke poured out. The president of the Academy, Anatoliy Zahorodniy, stated that the attack happened while many members of staff were inside the building. He said: "We are not connected with the military. This is an attack on science. It is terrorism." There are no military targets near the building.

== Chief executive posts ==
NASU presidents
Vladimir Vernadsky	1918–1921
Orest Levytsky (Note: Acting, due to situation in Ukraine and Eastern Europe.)	1919–1921
Mykola Vasylenko	1921–1922
Orest Levytsky	1922
Volodymyr Lipsky	1922–1928
Danylo Zabolotny	1928–1929
Aleksandr Bogomolets	1930–1946
Vladimir Plotnikov	1941–1942
Aleksandr Palladin	1946–1962
Borys Paton	1962–2020
Anatoly Zagorodny	2020 – incumbent

NASU chief secretaries
Ahatanhel Krymsky	1918–1928
Ovksentiy Korchak-Chepurivsky	1928–1934
Izrail Agol	1934–1937
Mykhailo Kyrpychenko	1941
V.Chudynov	1941–1942
Anatoliy Shpak	
Anatoly Zagorodny	2009–2011
Vyacheslav Bohdanov	2015 –

== Structure and administration ==
The National Academy of Sciences of Ukraine, according to its official status, is a higher scientific self-governed organization of Ukraine and was founded on state property. The self-government of the Academy is kept in the independent determination of its research's thematic and forms of its organization and realization, the formation of its organizational structure, solving its own issues with the administration of research, its financing, and professional cadres, fulfillment of its international scientific relations, free election and collegiality of its governing authority. The Academy brings together full members, corresponding members, and its foreign members, all scientists of its institutions, organizes and conducts fundamental and applied scientific research in the most important issues of natural, technical, social, and humanitarian sciences.

=== Administration ===
The highest body of self-government of the National Academy of Sciences of Ukraine is its General Assembly (Ukrainian: Загальні збори, Zahalni zbory), which consists of full members (academicians) and corresponding members. Except for issues relating to the election of full members, corresponding members and foreign members of the Academy, at the General Assembly sessions take part with the right of decisive vote scientists who were delegated by work collective of the Academy's scientific institutions and with the right of advisory vote foreign members, directors of the Academy's scientific institutions, and representatives of scientific community.

In the period between the General Assembly sessions, the Academy's activities are administered (supervised) by the National Academy of Sciences of Ukraine Presidium, which is elected by the General Assembly to a term of five years. The NASU Presidium that was last elected in April 2015 consists of 32 persons, including a president, five vice-presidents, Chief Scientific Secretary, 14 department secretaries-academicians, and 11 other members. In the Presidium, sessions take place with the right of advisory vote for five acting Presidium members and 14 NASU Presidium advisers. The Presidium meets in the former building of Countess Levashova that the Academy owns since its establishment in 1918. The Presidium also directs operations of the Academy's publishing institutions as well as some selected science and other institutions, among which are its own exposition center, Grand Conference Hall, etc.

In the NASU function 3 sections with 14 departments within them. There are also six regional science centers in various regions of the country, which have dual subordination also to the Ministry of Education and Science of Ukraine. The basic elements of the NASU's structure are scientific research institutes and other scientific institutions such as observatories, botanical gardens, arboreta, nature preserves, libraries, museums, other. In 2006, the Academy accounted for 43,613 employees, including 16,813 researchers; among them, 2,493 with the degree of Doctor of Sciences and 7,996 with the degree of Candidate of Sciences.

The NASU is responsible for over 90% of all discoveries made in Ukraine, including the transmutation of lithium into helium, the production of heavy water, and the development of a 3-D radar that operates in the decimeter range.

=== Sections ===
- Section of Physical-Technical and Mathematical Sciences
  - Department of Mathematics
  - Department of Computer Science
  - Department of Mechanics
  - Department of Physics and Astronomy
  - Department of Earth Sciences
  - Department of Physical and Technical Problems of Materials Science
  - Department of Physical and Technical Problems of Power Engineering
  - Department of Nuclear Physics and Power Engineering
- Section of Chemical and Biological Sciences
  - Department of Chemistry
  - Department of Biochemistry, Physiology and Molecular Biology
  - Department of General Biology
- Section of Social Sciences and Humanities
  - Department of Economics
  - Department of History, Philosophy and Law
  - Department of Literature, Language and Art Studies

=== Regional centers ===
The regional science centers (SCs) are:

- Donetsk SC (center in Donetsk, temporarily relocated to Kramatorsk) – 9 research institutes
- Western SC (Lviv) – 18 institutes
- Southern SC (Odesa) – 7 institutes
- North-East SC (Kharkiv) led by Volodymyr Semynozhenko since 25 November 1992 – 17 institutes
- Dnieper SC (Dnipro) – 7 institutes
- Crimea SC (Simferopol) – 8 institutes (statutory activities and financing have been suspended since 2014)

Most institutions of the Academy (212) are placed in the city of Kyiv, followed by Kharkiv (39) and Lviv (27). The Academy is represented at least by one institution in most of the oblasts in Ukraine, except Volyn, Rivne, Ternopil, Khmelnytsky, Vinnytsia, and Kirovohrad.

=== Scientific institutions of the NASU ===
==== Libraries ====
There are two national libraries affiliated with the NASU:

- V. I. Vernadsky National Library of Ukraine with 10 million books, manuscripts
- V. Stefanyk National Library in Lviv

==== Institutes ====
- A. Pidhornyi Institute of Mechanical Engineering Problems in Kharkiv

==== Parks and nature reserves ====
The Department of General Biology includes a number of parks and nature reserves.

- Trostianets dendro-park
- Donetsk Botanic Garden
- Danube Biosphere Preserve
- Karadah Nature Preserve
- Kryvyi Rih Botanic Garden
- Luhansk Nature Preserve
- M.M. Gryshko National Botanical Garden
- Oleksandriya dendro-park
- Sofiyivka dendro-park
- Ukrainian Steppe Nature Preserve
- Black Sea Biosphere Reserve

=== Publishers ===
Until 2024, the NASU had two publishing houses:

- Naukova Dumka «Наукова думка» (roughly "Scientific Thought") from 1922 to 2024
- Akademperiodyka «Академперіодика» (roughly "Academic Periodical"), since 2001, which took over all activities of Naukova Dumka in 2024

The NASU has made major contributions to most of the major fields of science.

=== Former (disbanded) institutions ===
- Commission in research of the Soviet Law (1927–1934)
  - Cabinet of the Soviet Construction and Law (1930–1934)
- Commission in research of the History of Western-Russian and Ukrainian Law (1919–1934)
- Commission about the History of Common Law (1918–1934)
- Demographic Institute (1918–1938)

== Awards ==
=== Bogoliubov Prize ===
The Bogoliubov Prize is an award offered by the National Academy for scientists with outstanding contributions to theoretical physics and applied mathematics. The award is issued in memory of theoretical physicist and mathematician Nikolay Bogoliubov. The award was founded in 1992.

==== Laureates ====
- 2004 — Anton Naumovets
- 2002 — Leonid A. Pastur, for a cycle of works on research of the theory of a field and the theory of disordered systems
- 2002 — Sergiy Peletminsky, for the set of works "Field theory and the theory of disordered systems".
- 1998 — A. V. Pogorelov, for a series of "Creation and support of advanced mathematical methods for solving problems in physics and mathematics"
- 1997 — Vasiliy S. Vladimirov
- 1996 — Vladimir A. Marchenko, for a series of "functional-algebraic methods in mathematical physics"
- 1993 — Oleksandr Sharkovsky, for a series of his works "The theory of scattering of quantum systems and one-dimensional dynamical systems".
- 1992 — Yurii Mitropolskiy, for a series of his works "Method of averaging and its applications to mathematical and theoretical physics".

=== Vernadsky Gold Medal ===
The Academy has awarded its Vernadsky Gold Medal annually since 2004 to the most distinguished academicians.

- 2003 Borys Paton
- 2004 Platon Kostiuk and Szilveszter E. Vizi
- 2005 Viktor Skopenko and Nikolai Plate
- 2006 Yurii Mitropolskiy and Yury Osipov
- 2007 Myroslav Popovych and Georges Nivat
- 2008 Viktor Baryakhtar and Vladimir Kadyshevsky
- 2009 Volodymyr Marchenko and Jean Bourgain
- 2010 Mikhail Lisitsa and Manuel Cardona
- 2011 Borys Oliynyk and Blaže Ristovski
- 2012 Mykola Bahrov and Nikolai Laverov
- 2013 Oleksandr Huz and Herbert Mang
- 2014 Vadym Loktev and Alexei Abrikosov
- 2015 Anthony Turner and Ganna V. Elska
- 2016 Valeriy Skorokhod and Giorgi Tavadze
- 2017 Volodymyr Morgun and George Fedak
- 2018 Oleksiy Onyschenko and Michael Moser
- 2019 Lukyan Anatychuk and Juri Grin
- 2020 Anton Naumovets and Anton Zeilinger
- 2021
- 2022 Volodymyr Horbulin and Janusz Kacprzyk
- 2023 Aaron Ciechanover and Serhiy Komisarenko

== See also ==
- National Herbarium of Ukraine
- Members of the National Academy of Sciences of Ukraine

=== State-funded research institutions ===
- Institute for Problems of Cryobiology and Cryomedicine
- National Academy of Arts of Ukraine
- National Academy of Medical Sciences of Ukraine
- National Academy of Agrarian Sciences of Ukraine
- National Academy of Legal Sciences of Ukraine
- National Academy of Pedagogical Sciences of Ukraine
- Minor Academy of Sciences of Ukraine

=== Public-funded research institutions ===
- Academy of Mining Sciences of Ukraine
- Academy of Economic Sciences of Ukraine
- Academy of Higher Education of Ukraine
- Shevchenko Scientific Society
- Ukrainian Free Academy of Sciences of Canada (Winnipeg)
- Ukrainian Academy of Art and Sciences in the US (New York)

=== University ===
Kyiv Academic University (KAU) is a pilot research university in Ukraine, established by a government decree on December 14, 2016. It is a state scientific institution under the dual authority of the National Academy and the Ministry of Education and Science of Ukraine.

KAU has 10 departments, three research centers (Data Science Research Center, Center for Quantum Technologies, Center for Life Sciences), and an Innovation Center. Among its departments are:

- Department of Applied Physics and Material Science (based at the Paton Institute of Electric Welding)
- Department of Applied Physics and Nanoscale Systems (based at the Kurdyumov Institute of Metal Physics)
- Department of Fundamental Problems of General and Applied Physics (based at the Institute of Physics)
- Department of Biomedicine and Neuroscience (based at the Kyiv Academic University);
- Department of Theoretical and Mathematical Physics (based at the Bogolyubov Institute for Theoretical Physics)
- Department of Mathematics (based at the NASU Institute of Mathematics)
- Department of Theoretical Cybernetics and Optimal Control Methods (based at the Glushkov Institute of Cybernetics)
- Department Molecular Biology and Biotechnology (based at the NASU Institute of Molecular Biology and Genetics)

KAU's main activities include:

- Conducting scientific research in cutting-edge areas with student involvement
- Educating students with top NAS scientists experienced in international collaboration
- Promoting innovation
- Developing continuous scientific education and popularizing science
