= Ukrainian Scientific Society =

- Formation: 1907
- Dissolved: 1921
- Headquarters: Kyiv, Ukraine
- Chairman: Mykhailo Hrushevsky

Ukrainian Scientific Society (Ukrainian: Українське наукове товариство [ʊkrɐˈjinʲsʲke nɐʊˈkɔwe towɐˈrɪstwo]) was a learned society established in Kyiv in 1907. It was predecessor of the National Academy of Sciences of Ukraine and later in 1921 it fully integrated within the last one. The society was created on the initiative of Mykhailo Hrushevsky and under his chairmanship on the example of the Shevchenko Scientific Society that existed in Lemberg (Austro-Hungary). The primary goal of the society was an organization of science work and its popularization through the Ukrainian language.

The society had several sections: historical, philological, natural-technical, medical, and statistical commissions.
