= Ukrainian Botanical Journal =

Ukrainian Botanical Journal Український ботанічний журнал
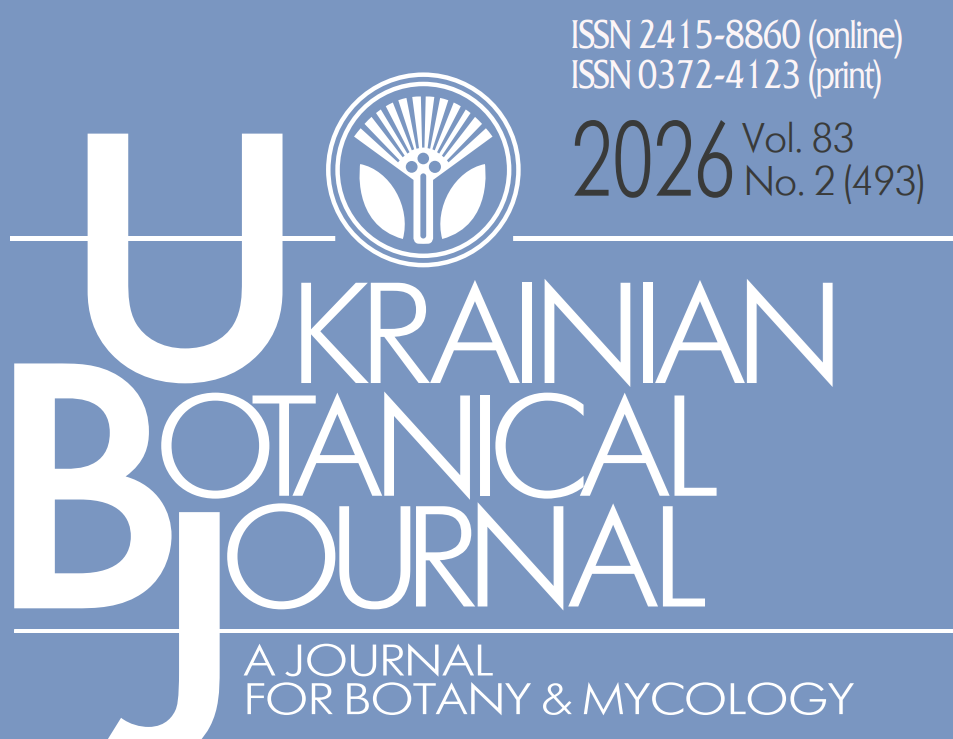
- Discipline: botany and mycology
- Language: English and Ukrainian (until 2015 also Russian)

Publication details
- Former names: Zhurnal Instytutu Botaniky Vseukrayins'koyi Akademiyi Nauk (1930s); Botanichnyi Zhurnal (1940–1955)
- History: 1921–present
- Publisher: Akademperiodyka (Ukraine)
- Frequency: Bimonthly
- Open access: Yes
- ISO 4: Find out here

Indexing
- ISSN: 0372-4123 (print); 2415-8860 (web)

Links
- Journal homepage

The Ukrainian Botanical Journal (UBJ; Ukrainian: Український ботанічний журнал, romanized: Ukrajinsjkyj Botanichnyj Zhurnal) is an academic journal that publishes the results of scientific research in the fields of botany and mycology. It is published by Akademperiodyka, the publishing house of the National Academy of Sciences of Ukraine (NASU).

== Description ==
The UBJ is published in Kyiv in Ukrainian and English, as a single volume comprising six issues each year.

It contains scientific articles on botany and mycology, in particular on floristics, ecology, systematics, evolution, physiology, biochemistry of plants and fungi, and so on. It also publishes chronicles, reviews and bibliographies. The chronicle section publishes reports by institute staff on research and scientific publications issued in the previous year. It also publishes conference proceedings.

== Editorial staff ==
From 1931 to 1940, Mykola Kholodnyi was the editor-in-chief of the journal; from 1946 to 1971, it was Dmytro Zerov. From 1972 to 1976, the editor was Havrylo Bilyk.

For a time (1965–1972), the well-known Ukrainian dissident and writer Yevhen Sverstiuk served as the journal’s executive editor.

== History ==
"On the biology of blossoming in the sugar beet", a 1934 paper in the Journal of the VUAN Botanical Society. The Ukrainian original text is above, a list of references to sources in Dutch, English, (Note: Including to The Effects of Cross and Self Fertilisation in the Vegetable Kingdom (1876) by Charles Darwin.) German, Swedish and Russian in the middle, and an abstract in English below.

The Ukrainian Botanical Journal was first published in late 1921 by the Botanical Section of the Ukrainian Scientific Society in Kyiv, which, following the merger of the Ukrainian Scientific Society with the All-Ukrainian Academy of Sciences that same year, became the Ukrainian Botanical Society. By 1929, four further issues of the journal had been published: in 1924, 1926, 1928 and 1929. When the first issues were published in the 1920s and 1930s, abstracts were provided in French, German, or English.

Between 1931 and 1933, four double issues were published under the title Journal of the Bio-Botanical Cycle of the All-Ukrainian Academy of Sciences. From 1934, the newly established M. G. Kholodny Institute of Botany of the National Academy of Sciences of Ukraine published the Journal of the Institute of Botany of the All-Ukrainian Academy of Sciences (between 1936 and 1939 — “Journal of the Institute of Botany of the Academy of Sciences of the Ukrainian SSR”). During these years, 20 issues were published, at a rate of 3–4 per year. From 1940, the title of the publication changed to “Botanical Journal of the Academy of Sciences of the Ukrainian SSR”, and in 1956 it was renamed Ukrainian Botanical Journal. Between 1940 and 1958, one volume was published each year, divided into four issues, and since 1959, six issues have been published per volume.

Between 1997 and 2012, the entire publishing cycle of the journal was handled by the publishing house Akademperiodyka.

Between 1921 and 1971, the most prolific authors were Andriy Barbarych, Havrylo Bilyk, Mariya Zerova, Dmytro Zerov, Mykhailo Kotov, and Yakiv Modilevsky.

The journal was published in the Ukrainian language in the 1970s. In 1993, the English subtitle "Ukrainian Botanical Journal" was added. By 2013, the publication languages shifted towards Ukrainian/English, with abstracts in English and Russian. Until issue 6 of 2015, abstracts in Russian were also included; 2016:1 was the first bilingual Ukrainian/English issue. From issue 2020:1, Ukrainian Botanical Journal (the English subtitle since 1993) became the cover title, and «Український ботанічний журнал» became the subtitle.

== Impact ==
The journal is indexed in a number of scientometric databases, including JSTOR and Web of Science (without calculating the impact factor).

In 2020, the journal was classified as ‘Category B’ in the register of specialist scientific journals maintained by the Ministry of Education and Science of Ukraine.

== Gallery ==
Fulltext issues 9 to 14 (1934–1935)

Fulltext issues 15 to 20 (1936–1937)

Fulltext issues 25 to 27 (1938)

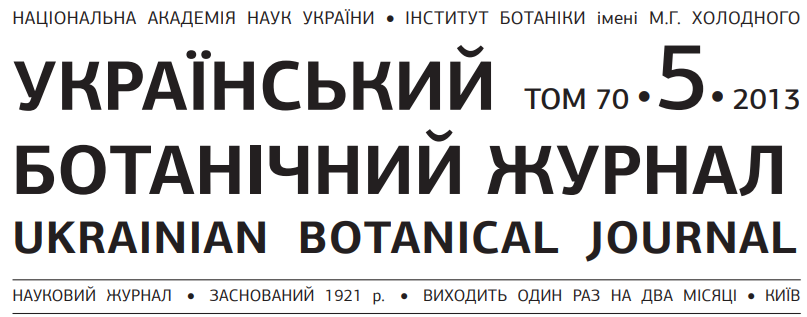
Title page issue 2013:5

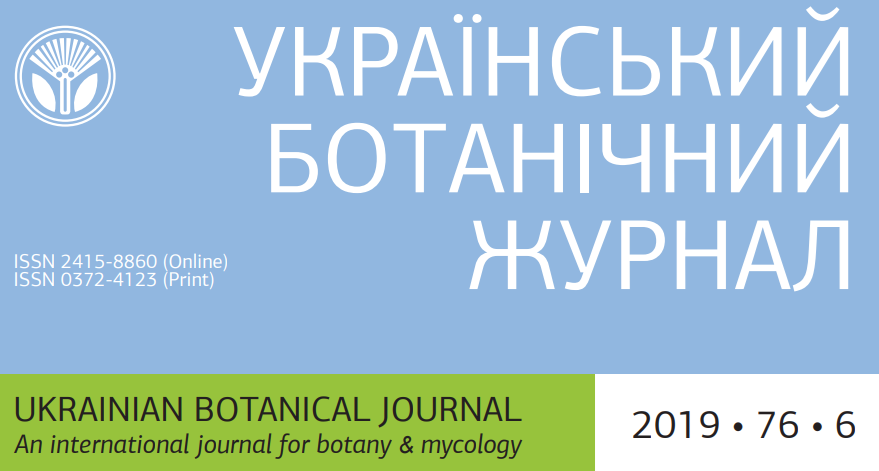
Cover issue 2019:6

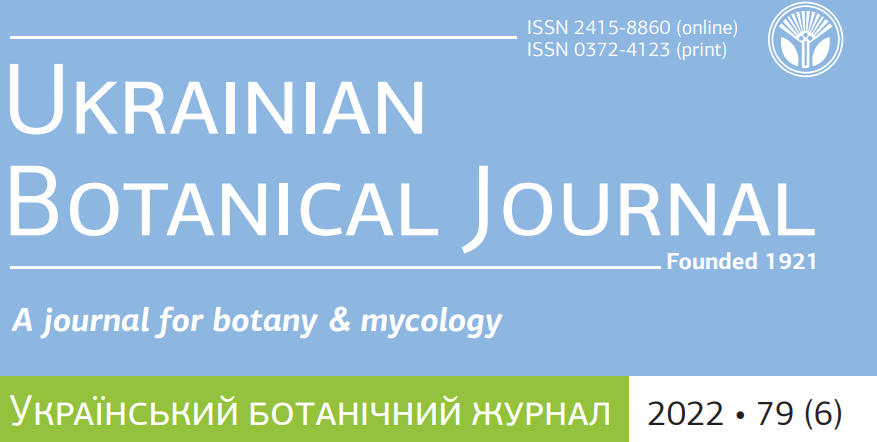
Cover issue 2022:6

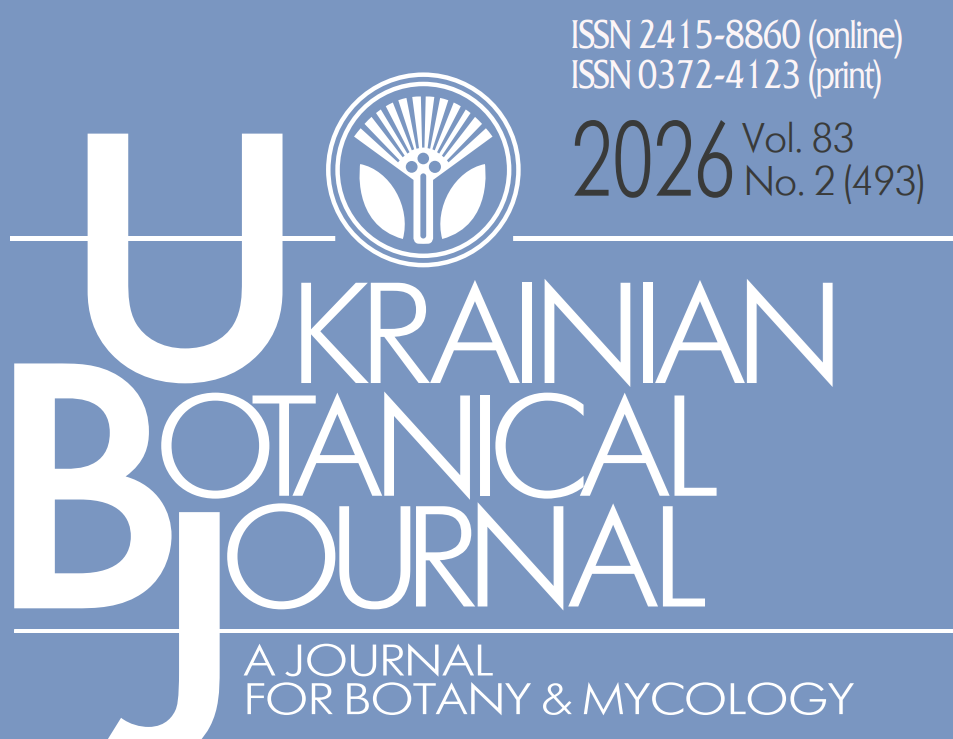
Cover issue 2026:2

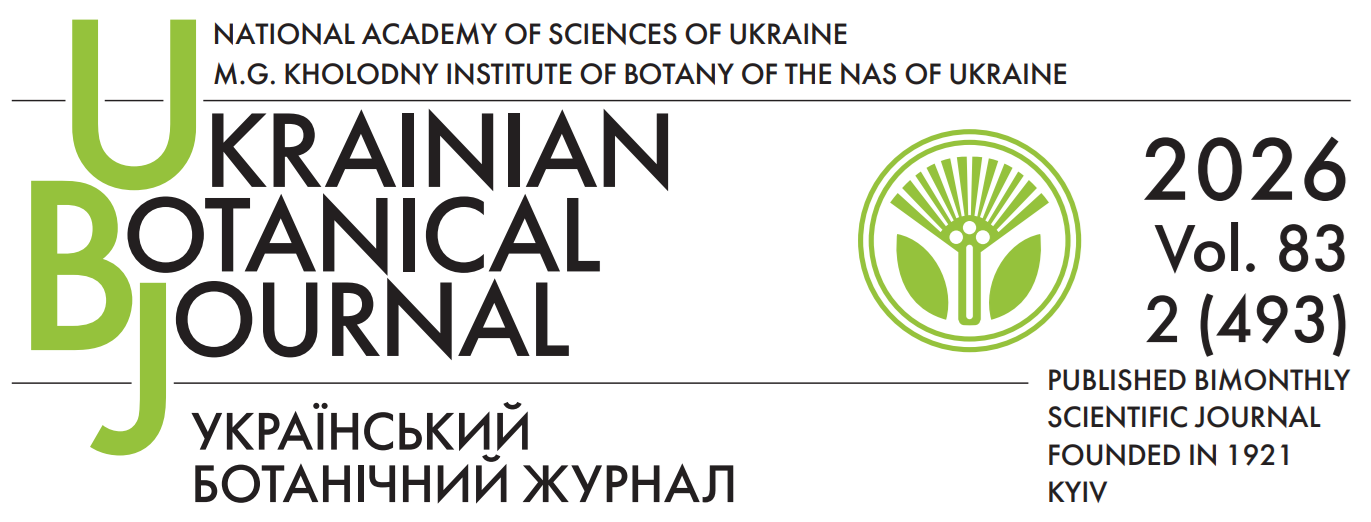
Title page issue 2026:2

== See also ==
- Akademperiodyka
  - Algologia
  - Ukrainian Chemistry Journal
  - Ukrainian Journal of Physics
  - Zoodiversity

== Sources ==
- "Український ботанічний журнал". Archived from the original on 9 August 2017. // Encyclopedia of Ukrainian Studies: Dictionary part: [in 11 vols.] / Shevchenko Scientific Society ; editor-in-chief prof., Dr. Volodymyr Kubiyovych . — Paris — New York: Young Life 1955—1995. — ISBN 5-7707-4049-3.
