= Publishing house Svit =

Publishing house in Lviv, Ukraine

State Enterprise "All-Ukrainian Specialised Publishing House 'Svit'"
- Trade name: Publishing house "Svit"
- Native name: Державне підприємство «Всеукраїнське спеціалізоване видавництво „Світ“»
- Romanized name: Derzhavne pidpryjemstvo «Vseukrajinsjke specializovane vydavnyctvo „Svit“»
- Formerly: Вища школа ("Higher School")
- Industry: Publishing
- Founded: 25 October 1946
- Founder: Yevhen Kostyantynovich Lazarenko
- Headquarters: Halytska Street 21, Lviv, Ukraine
- Key people: Ihor Andriyovych Melnyk (director)
- Products: All literature
- Website: svit.gov.ua

Publishing house "Svit", (Note: Ukrainian: Видавництво «Світ», romanized: Vidavnyctvo "Svit".) meaning "World", is a state publishing house in Ukraine, based in Lviv. Founded in 1946, its official full name is State Enterprise "All-Ukrainian Specialised Publishing House 'Svit'". (Note: Ukrainian: Державне підприємство «Всеукраїнське спеціалізоване видавництво „Світ“», romanized: Derzhavne pidpryjemstvo «Vseukrajinsjke specializovane vydavnyctvo „Svit“».) Svit mainly publishes educational literature for pupils and students.

== History ==
=== Soviet Ukraine ===
On 25 October 1946, an order was issued by the rector of the University of Lviv Yevhen Kostyantynovich Lazarenko "On preparing scientific publications by university researchers for printing", marking the foundation of the publishing house.

In 1963, the publishing house became a legal entity independent from the University of Lviv, and also began to publish books by scientists of other institutions of higher education in Lviv and Drohobych. In 1973, the Ministry of Education of Soviet Ukraine transferred its ownership to the publishing association "Higher School" (Ukrainian: Вища школа, romanized: Vyshcha shkola), and renamed it "Publishing House at Lviv University VO 'Higher School'" (Ukrainian: Видавництво при Львівському університеті ВО “Вища школа”, romanized: Vydavnyctvo pry Ljvivsjkomu universyteti VO “Vyshcha shkola”). As such, the publishing house issued scientific works and educational literature authored by scientists and scholars from all universities in the western region of Ukraine.

=== Restructuring ===
In 1989, a government decree reorganised the publishing association "Higher School" by splitting it into four independent republican publishing houses:

1. Publishing house "Higher School" itself in Kyiv (founded in 1968).
2. Publishing house Lybid (founded in 1835) at Taras Shevchenko National University of Kyiv.
3. Publishing house Osnova at VN Karazin Kharkiv National University (Kharkiv State University until 1999). (Not to be confused with Kharkiv-based Publishing house Osnova, founded in 2002; both names derive from Osnovianskyi District in Kharkiv).
4. Publishing house Svit (founded in 1946) at the University of Lviv.

The employees of the Lviv-based publishing house chose the name Svit ("World") for their newly-independent company, although Soviet officials initially refused approval, believing it to be connected to a samvydav publication. The employees successfully argued that this name continued the publishing traditions of Ivan Franko, who in 1881–1882 briefly published the magazine Svit in Lviv (then Lemberg). At the end of the 1980s, it was very difficult for the publishing house to maintain its printing capacity, but the team managed to get through the financial issues.

=== Independent Ukraine ===
Starting in 1990, the publishing house mass-produced Ukrainian literature despite all prohibitions, expanding significantly. It began printing Ukrainian writers, children's literature, and patriotic songs, the first Ukrainian translation of Dmytro Yavornytsky's famous work History of the Zaporizhian Cossacks in three volumes by Ivan Svarnyk (1990), and reprinting Stepan Rudnytsky's classic Why We Want an Independent Ukraine (1994, originally published in 1916). After Ukraine gained independence in 1991, the publishing house, in addition to printing banned books, also created new books for schools and universities.

In 2001, teacher and educational author Oksana Volodymyrivna Onopriyenko wrote that '"Svit" is a modern professional publishing house with a clearly established model of preparation and release for books, which has been producing scientific works for over half a century.' Among the books published by Sivt are: History of Ukrainian Literature by Mykhailo Voznyak, Imperative by Taras Salyha, The Word of the Gospel: Ukrainian Religious Poetry edited by Salyha, Selected Poems by Karol Wojtyła (later Pope John Paul II), and others.

During the Russo-Ukrainian War, publishing house Svit actively printed scientific, artistic, and patriotic Ukrainian literature. Svit celebrated its 70th anniversary in 2016, which was also dedicated to the 25th year of Ukrainian independence. Since the enactment of martial law in Ukraine when the full-scale Russian invasion of Ukraine began on 24 February 2022, the publisher has been working remotely.

== See also ==
- List of publishing companies of Ukraine
- Akademperiodyka (since 2001)
- Naukova Dumka (1922–2024); activities continued by Akademperiodyka

== Sources ==
- Hromyak, R. T.; Kovaliv, Yu. I.; Teremko, V. I., eds. (2007). ""Світ"". Літературознавчий словник-довідник (Literary Dictionary-Reference) (in Ukrainian). Kyiv: Академія (Akademija). p. 612.
