= Akademperiodyka =

- Industry: Publishing
- Founded: 2001
- Headquarters: Tereschenkivska St.4, Kyiv, 01601, Ukraine
- Products: Books, journals
- Website: akademperiodyka.org.ua

Publishing House Akademperiodyka (Ukrainian: Видавничий дім «Академперіодика», romanized: Vydavnychnyj dim "Akademperiodyka") is a publisher of the National Academy of Sciences of Ukraine (NASU), and a core organisation of the Scientific and Publishing Council of the NASU. Founded in 2001, it publishes academic periodicals (hence the name "Academ-periodica"), scientific journals, collections, fundamental monographs, textbooks for higher education institutions, dictionaries, and popular science literature. The primary mission of the publishing house is to inform the Ukrainian and foreign public about the achievements of national science. In December 2024, it took over the activities of the oldest Ukrainian publishing house, Naukova Dumka.

== History ==
In the first half of the 1990s, the lack of funding at the Academy of Sciences made it difficult to publish scientific papers. To remedy the situation, the Scientific and Publishing Council developed a concept for preserving and supporting scientific literature, especially periodicals. On the initiative of the Council, the NASU Presidium on 21 April 1995 decided to establish a Specialised Printing House of Scientific Journals.

Thanks to a grant from the International Renaissance Foundation, the first printing equipment was purchased. The company was lucky enough to buy back some of the worn-out equipment for a bargain, restore it and put it into operation. The difficult stage of setting up production was successfully completed due to the efforts of the first director of the printing house, L. F. Kurtenko.

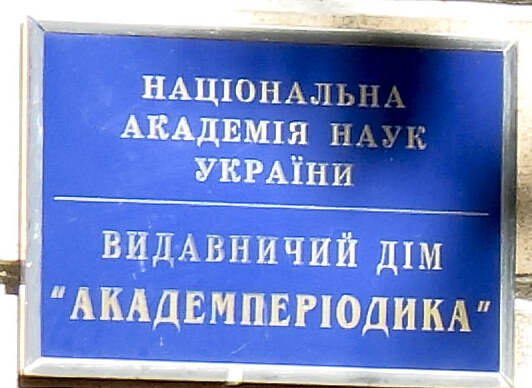
Akademperiodyka office plaque at 4 Tereshchenkivska Street in Kyiv (2016).

Since the late 1990s, the area of prepress has been actively developing. An editorial and publishing unit was created, which included the editorial offices of the journals Bulletin of the National Academy of Sciences of Ukraine and Reports of the National Academy of Sciences of Ukraine. The editorial, publishing, and printing stages of their publication were merged. In a few years, the printing house has been preparing and publishing 14 periodicals of the NAS of Ukraine.

The emergence of modern printing and computer technology has made it possible to significantly expand publishing activities. In view of this, on 13 October 2000, the NASU Presidium adopted the resolution "On the reorganisation of the Specialised Printing House of Scientific Journals at the Presidium of the National Academy of Sciences of Ukraine". Since 2001, the Specialised Printing House has been operating as the Publishing House Akademperiodyka. The structure of the institution was improved, the staff was increased, and production capacity was expanded. Since then, the tasks of the publishing house have included not only publishing, printing and distribution of scientific journals, but also providing printing services, methodological and advisory assistance on all publishing issues to the editors of academic periodicals. For this purpose, a special group of scientific and methodological support for the publishing activities of the NAS of Ukraine has been organised.

As of 2014, Akademperiodyka together with scientific institutions publishes sets of 43 scientific periodicals The publishing house has mastered full-colour printing, publishing books in hardcover and paperback. Since its inception, Akademperiodyka has published over 1000 books in Ukrainian, Russian and English.

Publisher Naukova Dumka (1922–2024) was housed in the building of the NASU Institute of Mathematics in Tereschenkivska street 3 in Kyiv until December 2024, when it was liquidated as a legal entity, and its activities were moved to publishing house Akademperiodyka across the street at Tereschenkivska 4.

== Fields of activity ==
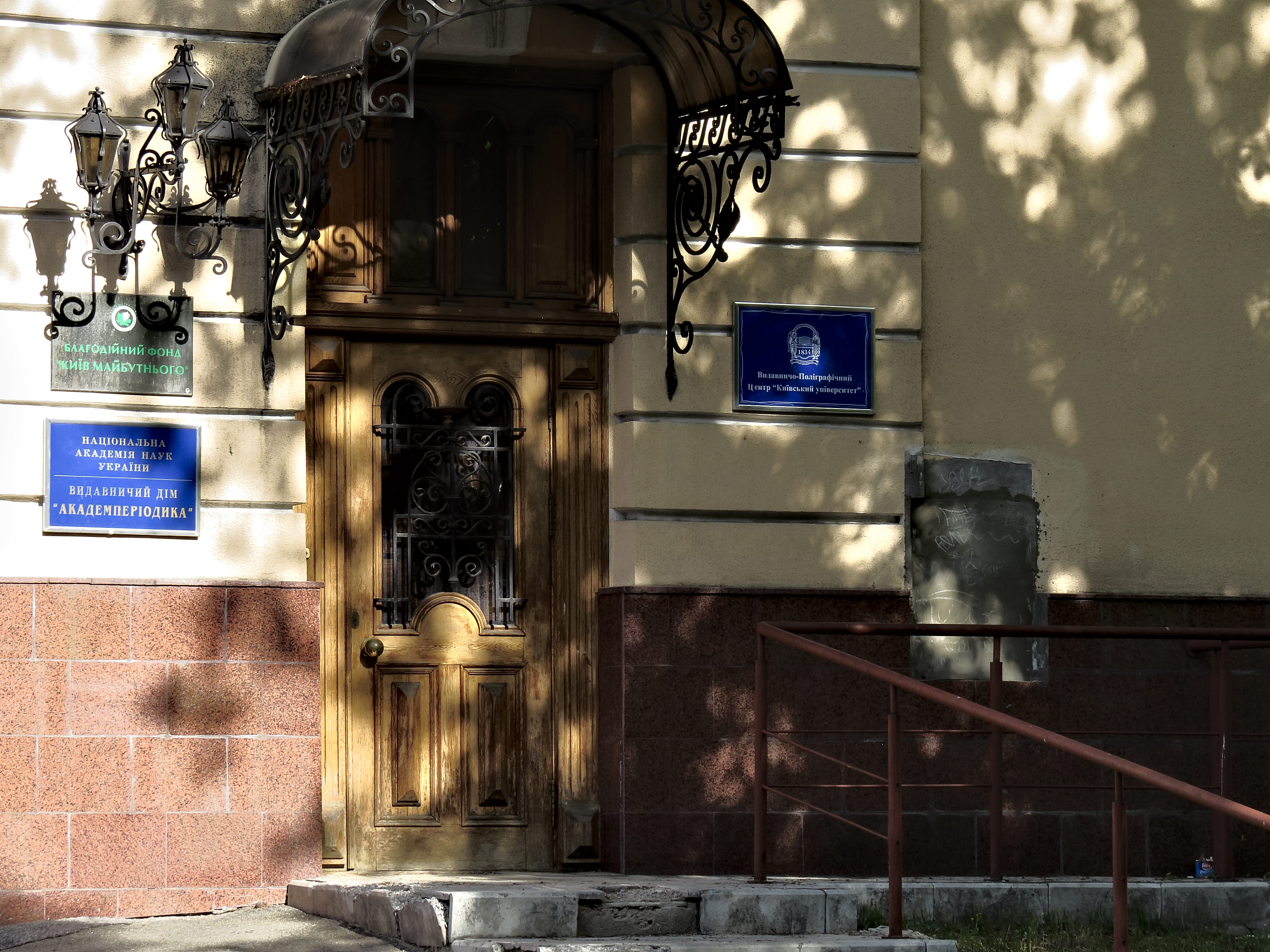
Publishing House Akademperiodyka, Tereschenkivska 4, Kyiv.

- Preparation and publication of general academic journals, such as «Вісник НАН України» (Bulletin of the National Academy of Sciences of Ukraine), «Доповіді НАН України» (Reports of the National Academy of Sciences of Ukraine), «Наука та інновації» / Science and Innovation, «Космічна наука та технології» (Space Science and Technology), collection «Наука України у світовому інформаційному просторі» (Ukraine's Science in the Global Information Space);
- Implementation of the programme of support for journals of the National Academy of Sciences of Ukraine (covers one third of the journals whose founders include the National Academy of Sciences of Ukraine);
- Publishing scientific monographs, popular science books and textbooks;
- Implementation of academic publishing projects, such as «Українська наукова книга іноземною мовою» (Ukrainian Scientific Book in a Foreign Language) and, «Наука для всіх» (Science for All);
- Publication of the general academic series Biobibliography of Scientists of Ukraine («Біобібліографія вчених України»);
- Publishing catalogues of books and periodicals;
- Advisory and methodological work on the publishing activities of scientific institutions, monitoring of periodicals and book publications of the Academy, preparation of recommendations for improving the system of academic publishing;
- Studying the history of publishing at the Academy of Sciences;
- Applied research on the introduction of the latest technologies at different stages of the publishing and printing process. Since 2009, annual scientific and practical conferences have been held Scientific periodicals: traditions and innovations («Наукова періодика: традиції та інновації»).

== Journal publications ==
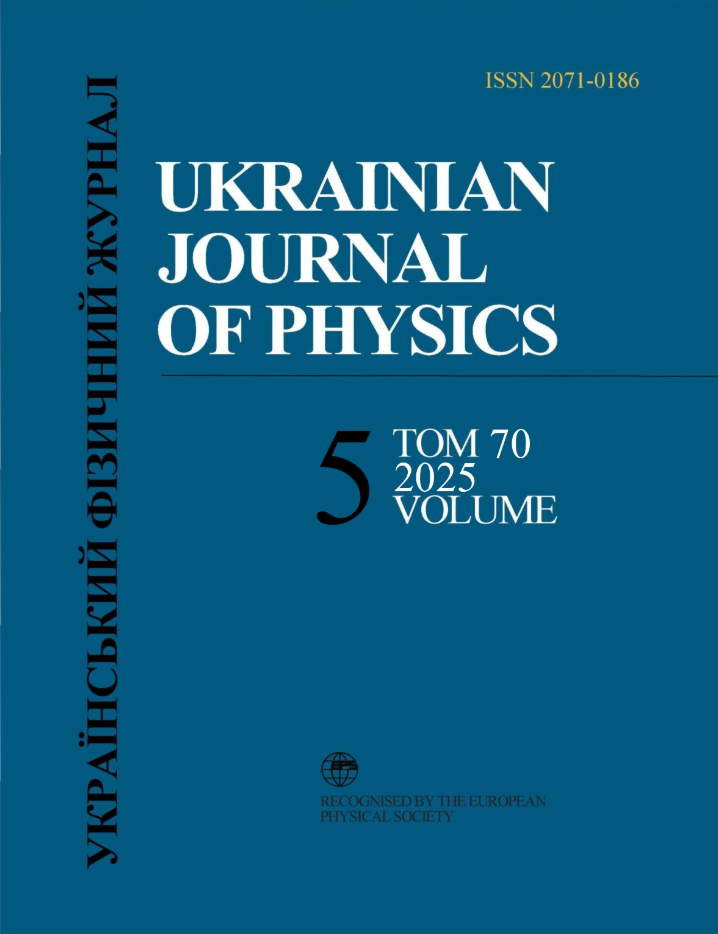
Ukrainian Journal of Physics (2025)

As of 2025, Akademperiodyka publishes 47 journals.

Many of these journals are bilingual Ukrainian/English, or have historically been bilingual Ukrainian/Russian, or trilingual Ukrainian/Russian/English. The use of English often goes back to the 1960s, initially as mere translations of abstracts or fulltext originally published in Russian or (increasingly) Ukrainian; examples include Strength of Materials and the Ukrainian Chemistry Journal. English-language content steadily increased after 1991, such as the Ukrainian Journal of Physics in 2004 commencing a separate translated English edition alongside existing Ukrainian and Russian editions; or by including original versions of articles submitted by international researchers.

In some cases, there are separate English and Ukrainian issues; in other journals, an article in English may be accompanied by an abstract or summary in Ukrainian or vice versa. A small number of journals, such as Zoodiversity (2019) and Science and Innovation (2021), have fully switched to publishing only in the English language. Other journals, including several periodicals dedicated to (Ukrainian) linguistics, culture and society, have been Ukrainian-only ever since they were founded.

Some journals were fairly early in switching to dual digital/printed editions, or online-only publication, while others did not have web editions until the need arose at the start of the COVID-19 pandemic in Ukraine in early 2020. Virtually all journals phased out the use of the Russian language in the journal titles, article contents and abstracts at various stages between 1991 and 2023. The Russo-Ukrainian War since February 2014, and the full-scale Russian invasion of Ukraine since February 2022, motivated most of the remaining journals to cease publishing in Russian, while others temporarily had to suspend their activities due to war-related disruptions. (Note: For example, the editorial board of the Kharkiv-based journal Problems of Cryobiology and Cryomedicine on 8 March 2022 posted an announcement, stating: "We regret to inform our readers and authors that due to invasion of russia to Ukraine, the activities of our Editorial office are impeded due to the heavy bombing of civil infrastructure in our home city Kharkiv by the russian army. The next issue of our journal may be postponed for some time." Issue no. #1 of 2022 was eventually published on 3 June 2022.)

Journals published by Akademperiodyka
Title in Ukrainian	Title in Russian (Note: If applicable.)	Title in English (Note: Either official or literal translation from Ukrainian.)	Notes
«Альгологія»	Альгология	Algologia	About algology (phycology). Since 1991. Probably Ukrainian/English since the 2010s, and Russian/English until the 2010s. (Note: As of 2006, "articles and table of contents in the journal [were] presented in Russian or English, abstracts in Russian, English and Ukrainian." By issue 2020:4, all contents were Ukrainian/English, with Russian only used in references.)
«Археологія»		Arheologia	Since 1947. Ukrainian/English.
«Zoodiversity»	«Вестник зоологии»	Zoodiversity	1967–2019: titled «Вестник зоологии»/Vestnik Zoologii (Russian for "Bulletin of Zoology"), with articles in Ukrainian, Russian, or English. 2019–present: titled Zoodiversity, with English-only articles.
«Вісник Національної академії наук України»		Visnyk of the National Academy of Sciences of Ukraine	Since 1928. Ukrainian/English.
«Геологія і корисні копалини Світового океану»	«Геология и полезные ископаемые мирового океана»	Geology and Mineral Resources of World Ocean	Subtitle: International Scientific and Theoretical Journal. Since 2005. Ukrainian/English, historically also Russian.
«Гідробіологічний журнал»	«Гидробиологический журнал»	Journal of Hydrobiology	Since 1965. Russian/Ukrainian until 2019; Ukrainian-only thereafter. English abstracts 2015–2018.
«Демографія та соціальна економіка»		Demography and Social Economy	Since 2004. Ukrainian/English.
«Доповіді Національної академії наук України»		Reports of the National Academy of Sciences of Ukraine	Since 1939.
«Інтородукція рослин»		Introduction of Plants	
«Кібернетика і обчислювальна техніка»	«Кибернетика и вычислительная техника»	Cybernetics and Computer Science	
«Кінематика і фізика небесних тіл»	«Кинематика и физика небесных тел»	Kinematics and Physics of Celestial Bodies	
«Космічна наука і технологія»		Space Science and Technology	Since 1995. Ukrainian/English, until issue 124 (2020:3) also Russian. Bilingual title "Космічна наука і технологія/Space Science and Technology" since issue 100 (2016:3). Abbreviation: "Space Sci. & Technol." (1995–2016: "Kosm. nauka tehnol.").
«Металофізика і новітні технології»	«Металлофизика и новейшие технологии»	Metallophysics and the Latest Technologies	
«Мінералогічний журнал»		Mineralogical Journal	
«Мовознавство»		Movoznavstvo	Meaning: "Linguistics" (literally "language-knowledge"). Since 1967. Ukrainian.
«Народознавчі зошити»		Ethnographic Notebooks	
«Наука та інновації»		Science and Innovation	Ukrainian-only 2005–2014. Bilingual Ukrainian/English 2014–2020. English-only 2021–present.
«Наука України у світовому інформаційному просторі»		Ukrainian Science in the Global Information Space	
«Нейрофізіологія»	«Нейрофизиология»	Neurophysiology	
«Нові інформаційні технології в освіті для всіх»	«Новые информационные технологии в образовании для всех»	New Information Technologies in Education for All	
«Порошкова металургія»	«Порошковая металлургия»	Powder Metallurgy	Historically trilingual Russian/Ukrainian/English, shifted towards Ukrainian/English. Had the Russian/English title "Порошковая металлургия/Powder Metallurgy" until the 2010s.
«Прикладна механіка: міжнародний науковий журнал»	«Прикладная механика»	International Applied Mechanics (1992–present)	Since 1955. Edited by the NASU Institute of Mechanics. Originally Russian/Ukrainian, with separate English-language issues translated primarily from Russian, later from Ukrainian. Former English title: Soviet Applied Mechanics (1965–1991).
«Проблеми програмування»		Problems of Programming	
«Проблеми кріобіології і кріомедицини»	«Проблемы криобиологии и криомедицины»	Problems of Cryobiology and Cryomedicine	Since 1985. Edited by the NASU Institute of Cryobiology and Cryomedicine Issues in Kharkiv. Bilingual Ukrainian/English, previously also Russian. (Note: In the 2010s, the journal provided trilingual abstracts, while bilingual Russian/English articles gradually shifted to bilingual Ukrainian/English articles; the journal title itself changed in 2018.)
«Проблеми міцності»	«Проблемы прочности»	Strength of Materials	Since 1969. Historically trilingual Russian/Ukrainian/English, shifted towards Ukrainian/English.
«Промислова теплотехніка»	«Промышленная теплотехника»	Industrial Heat Engineering	
«Процеси лиття»	«Процессы литья»	Casting Processes	
«Радіофізика і радіоастрономія»	«Радиофизика и радиоастрономия»	Radiophysics and Radio Astronomy	
«Світогляд»		Worldview	Since 2006. Ukrainian.
«Український ботанічний журнал»		Ukrainian Botanical Journal	Since 1921. Historically bilingual Russian/Ukrainian with abstracts in French, German and English; shifted towards Ukrainian/English with abstracts in English and Russian by 2013. Russian abstracts ended with 2016:1. With 2020:1, Ukrainian Botanical Journal (the English subtitle since 1993) became the cover title, and «Український ботанічний журнал» became the subtitle. Has had many former titles. (Note: Including Zhurnal Instytutu Botaniky Vseukrayins'koyi Akademiyi Nauk in the 1930s, and Botanichnyi Zhurnal (1940–1955).)
«Український хімічний журнал»	«Украинский химический журнал»	Ukrainian Chemistry Journal	Since 1925. Historically trilingual Russian/Ukrainian/English, shifted towards Ukrainian/English. Former title: Soviet Progress in Chemistry (1966–1992).
«Українська мова»		Ukrainian Language	Since 2001. Ukrainian.
«Український географічний журнал»		Ukrainian Geographical Journal	Since 1993. Ukrainian/English, also Russian until the 2010s.
«Український фізичний журнал»	«Украинский физический журнал»	Ukrainian Journal of Physics	Since 1956. Fully bilingual Ukrainian/English. Abbreviation: "Ukr. J. Phys."; English editions since 2004. Russian editions 1956–?.
«Управляючі системи і машини»	«Управляющие системы и машины»	Control Systems and Machines	
«Фізіологічний журнал»		Physiological Journal	
«Філософська думка»		Philosophical Thought	Since 1927. Ukrainian/English.
«Журнал Хімія і технологія води»	«Журнал Химия и технология воды»	Journal of Water Chemistry and Technology	Since 1979. Ukrainian/English. Until about 2020 also Russian.
«Хімія, фізика та технологія поверхні»		Chemistry, Physics and Technology of Surface	Since 2010. Ukrainian/English. Abbreviation: "Him. Fiz. Tehnol. Poverhni".
«Цитологія і генетика»	«Цитология и генетика»	Cytology and Genetics	Since 1967. Ukrainian/English, until 2020 also Russian.
«Електронне моделювання»	«Электронное моделирование»	Electronic Modelling	
«Semiconductor Physics Quantum Electronics & Optoelectronics»		Semiconductor Physics Quantum Electronics & Optoelectronics	Since 1998. "All articles are accepted and published in English."

== Book publications ==
The main fields in which the publishing house publishes scientific monographs are mathematics, computer science, mechanics, physics, materials science, metallophysics, thermal physics, astronomy, space science, chemistry, botany, hydrobiology, geology, geography, history, archeology, linguistics, and literary studies.

== See also ==
- List of publishing companies of Ukraine
- Naukova Dumka (1922–2024); activities continued by Akademperiodyka
- Publishing house Svit (since 1946)

== Literature ==
- Olena Hennadiyivna Vakarenko, A. I. Radchenko; Науково-видавнича діяльність Національної академії наук України: 2002–2011 рр [Scientific and publishing activities of the National Academy of Sciences of Ukraine: The Years 2002–2011]. – Kyiv: Akademperiodyka, 2013. – 142 pp.
- Didenko, Yu.V.; Radchenko, A.I. (2018). "The Printing and Publishing Activities in the National Academy of Sciences of Ukraine" (PDF). Nauka ta naukoznavstvo (in Ukrainian). 4: 112–124. doi:10.15407/sofs2018.04.112.
- F. L. Kurtenok; Нариси історії Видавничого дому «Академперіодика» [Essays on the history of the Publishing House Akademperiodyka]. – Kyiv: Akademperiodyka, 2012. – 58 pp.
