= Ukrainian Journal of Physics =

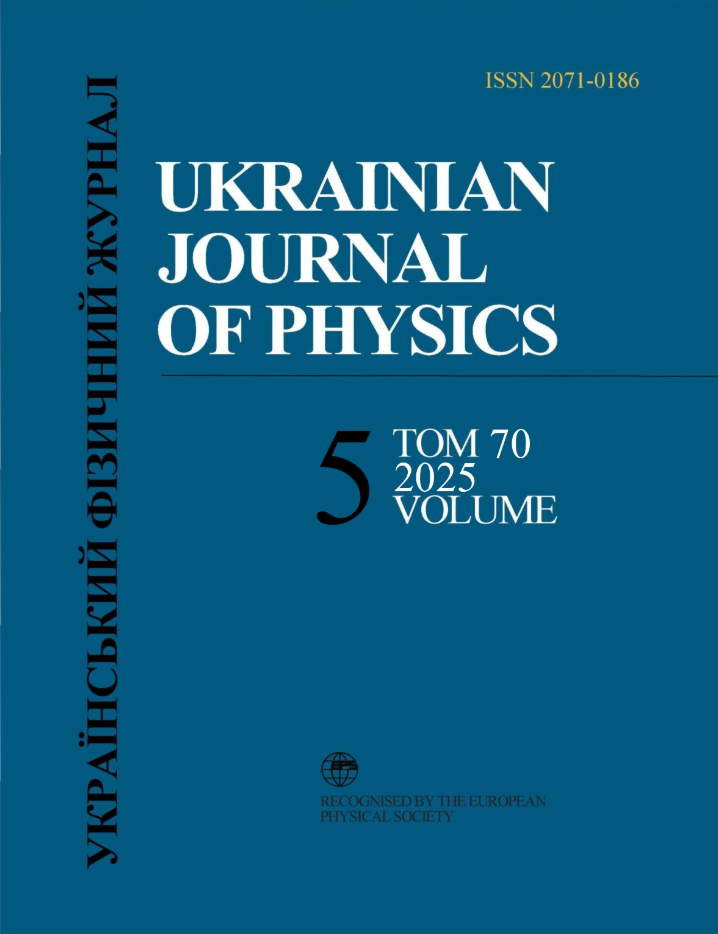
- Discipline: Theoretical and experimental physics
- Language: English, Ukrainian
- Edited by: Anatoliy Zahorodniy

Publication details
- History: 1956-present
- Publisher: Department of Physics and Astronomy of the National Academy of Sciences of Ukraine (Ukraine)
- Frequency: Monthly
- Open access: Yes
- Impact factor: 0.6 (2023)

Standard abbreviations
- ISO 4: Ukr. J. Phys.

Indexing
- ISSN: 2071-0186 (print); 2071-0194 (web)
- OCLC no.: 668940261

Links
- Journal homepage

The Ukrainian Journal of Physics (Ukrainian: Український фізичний журнал, Russian: Украинский физический журнал), is a peer-reviewed scientific journal covering the field of experimental and theoretical physics, including field theory and the theory of elementary particles, nuclear physics, plasma physics, atomic physics, molecular physics, condensed matter physics, optics, radiophysics, and electronics. The journal was established in 1956 (Ukrainian and Russian editions) and until 1994 was published by Naukova Dumka. Beginning from 1994, the journal has been published by the Bogolyubov Institute for Theoretical Physics, National Academy of Sciences of Ukraine. Since 2004, the journal has an English edition. It is recognized by the Higher Attestation Commission of Ukraine. The editor-in-chief is Anatoliy Zahorodniy (Bogolyubov Institute for Theoretical Physics, National Academy of Sciences of Ukraine).

UJP is indexed by Scopus, Web of Science, JICindex, CWTS Leiden Ranking.

== See also ==
- Akademperiodyka, its publisher
- Strength of Materials (journal)
- Ukrainian Chemistry Journal
