= Publisher Oleksandr Savchuk =

Ukrainian publishing company

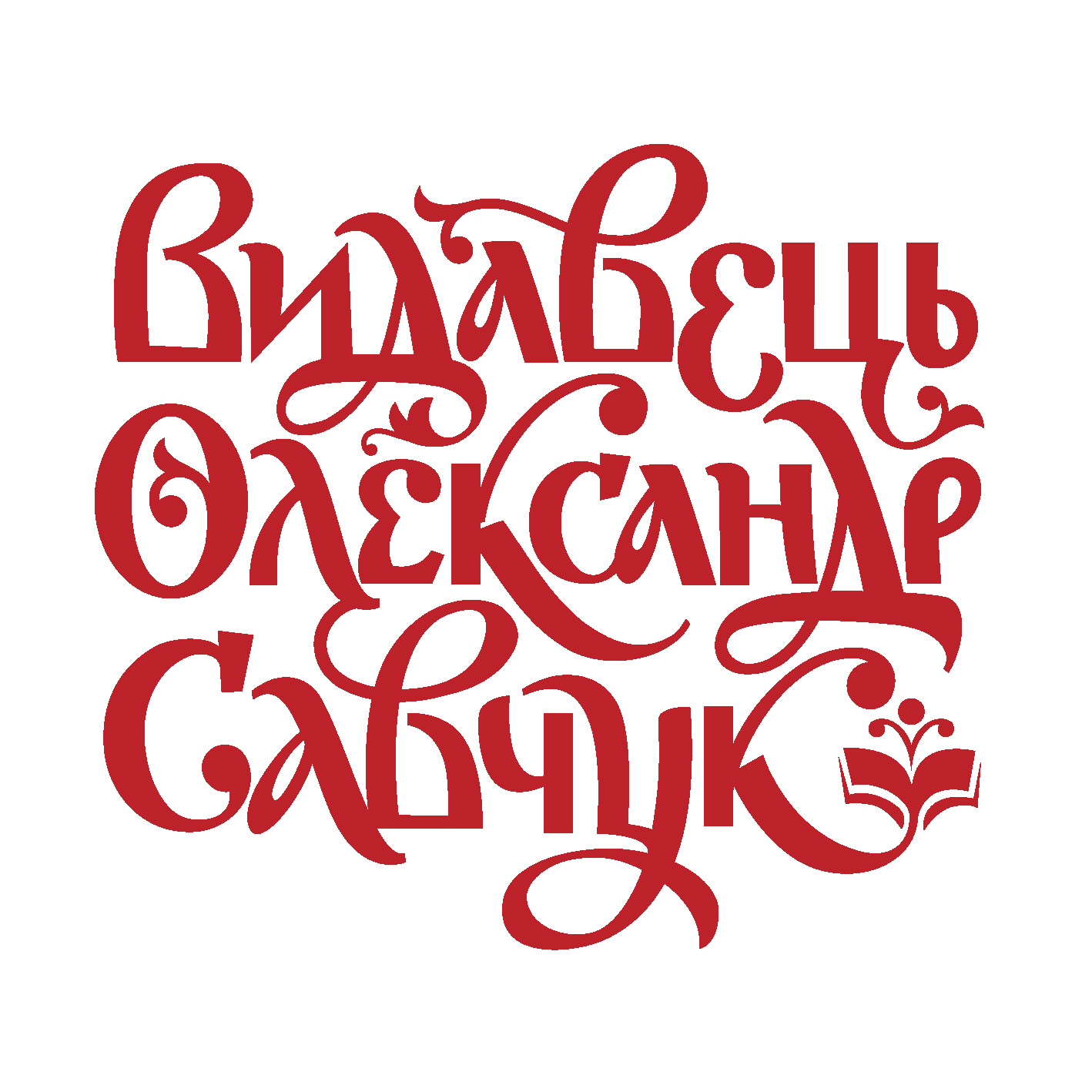
- Founded: 2010; 16 years ago
- Founder: Oleksandr Savchuk
- Country of origin: Ukraine
- Headquarters location: Kharkiv
- Official website: savchook.com/en

Publisher Oleksandr Savchuk (Ukrainian: Видавець Олександр Савчук) is a Ukrainian publishing house for Ukrainian art, architecture and ethnography, founded in Kharkiv in 2010.

== History ==
The publishing house was founded by the philosopher Oleksandr Savchuk in 2010 on the day of the Intercession of Mary with the mission to popularize the great names of Ukrainian science, culture and art that fell into obscurity during the Soviet Union.

2011 the publishing house launched the series Sloboda's World (Слобожанський світ), dedicated to the cultural heritage of Sloboda Ukraine.

In 2016, Oleksandr Savchuk published the Complete Academic Collection of Works (Повна академічна збірка творів) by Hryhorii Skovoroda.

The publishing house continued to operate despite the constant Russian shelling of Kharkiv, which began after Russia's invasion of Ukraine in 2022.

In October 2023, Savchuk opened a ‘book shelter’ (КнигоУкриття) in the centre of Kharkiv, a place where visitors can find shelter, attend events and read books.

Publisher Oleksandr Savchuk received the Special Award of the Frankfurt Book Fair in 2023 for preserving cultural heritage and returning prominent names, phenomena and objects to Ukraine's cultural discourse.

== Authors ==
Publisher Oleksandr Savchuk specialises in the scientific publications of the classics of Ukrainian ethnography, cultural history and art history: Dmytro Yavornytsky, Mykola Biliashivsky, Dmytro Bahalii, Mykhailo Hrushevsky, Stefan Taranushenko, Hnat Khotkevych, Volodymyr Shukhevych, Fedir Vovk, Mykhailo Dragan, Pavlo Zholtovskyi, Yurii Shevelov, Leonid Ushkalov, Myron Korduba.

The publications are dedicated to the work of artists such as Heorhiy Narbut, Mychailo Boychuk, Vasyl Krychevsky, Mykhailo Zhuk, Oleksa Novakivskyi, Opanas Slastion.

== Publications (selection) ==
- Гнат Хоткевич. Музичні інструменти українського народу. (Hnat Khotkevych. Musical instruments of the Ukrainian people). Kharkiv 2018, ISBN 978-617-7538-20-1 (Ukrainian)
- Лесь Курбас. Філософія театру. (Les Kurbas. Philosophy of Theatre). Kharkiv 2022, ISBN 978-617-7538-82-9 (Ukrainian)
- Mykola Biliashivskyi. The peasant art of Ukraine. / Микола Біляшівський. Українське народне мистецтво. Kharkiv 2022, ISBN 978-617-7538-79-9 (English and Ukrainian)
- Yurii Shevelov: Triptych on the purpose of Ukraine. Kharkiv 2023, ISBN 978-966-2562-92-7 (Ukrainian)
- Vasyl Krychevskyi. Ornament compositions. / Василь Кричевський.Oрнаментні композиції . Kharkiv 2023, ISBN 978-617-7538-90-4 (English and Ukrainian)
- Liubov Panchenko. Recovery. / Любов Панченко. Повернення . Kyiv-Kharkiv 2023, ISBN 978-617-7538-74-4 (English and Ukrainian)
- Antonina Tymchenko. Cape of Good Hope. / Антоніна Тимченко. Мис доброї надії. Kharkiv 2024, ISBN 978-617-8157-30-2 (English and Ukrainian)

== See also ==
- List of publishing companies of Ukraine
