= Ukrainian Chemistry Journal =

Ukrainian Chemistry Journal Український хімічний журнал
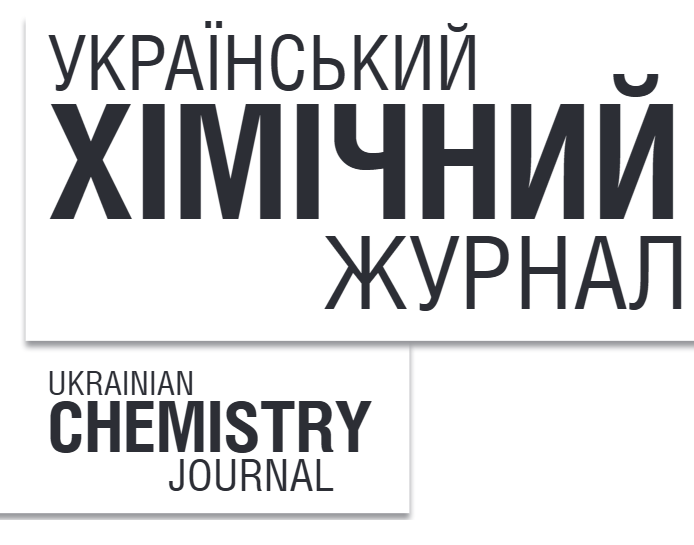
- Discipline: Inorganic, organic, physical chemistry, electrochemistry, and polymer chemistry
- Language: English and Ukrainian (historically also Russian)

Publication details
- Former names: Soviet Progress in Chemistry (1966–1992); Украинский химический журнал (Russian edition)
- History: 1925–present
- Publisher: Akademperiodyka (Ukraine)
- Frequency: Bimonthly
- Open access: Yes
- ISO 4: Find out here

Indexing
- ISSN: 0041-6045

Links
- Journal homepage

The Ukrainian Chemistry Journal (Ukrainian: Украї́нський хімі́чний журна́л, romanized: Ukrajinsjkyj khimichnyj zhurnal) is an academic journal in chemistry, an organ of the Department of Chemistry and Chemical Terminology of the National Academy of Sciences of Ukraine (NASU). It publishes theoretical and experimental works of scientists and engineers from various institutions, as well as chronicles, bibliography and reviews in various fields of chemical sciences.

== History ==
A 1932 issue (full PDF)

The journal was initially published in 1925–1938 in Kharkiv, and in 1948 it was resumed in Kyiv. From 1966 to 1992, the journal was published under the title Soviet Progress in Chemistry, and from 1992 to 1999 under the name Ukrainian Chemistry Journal (ISSN 1063-4568). Until 1967, it was reprinted in full and distributed by Faraday Press Inc. and later by Allerton Press, New York.

In 1988–1992, the editor-in-chief of the journal was academician Oleksandr Volodymyrovych Horodysky, and in 1992–2016, NASU member Serhii Vasyljovych Volkov.

From 1983 to 2005, the journal was indexed by Scopus, first as Soviet Progress in Chemistry, and then Ukrainskij Khimicheskij Zhurnal. As of 2005, it had SCImago Journal Rank 0.116, and its h-index was equal to 8. The journal is included in the List of scientific professional editions of Ukraine under the speciality Chemistry.

== See also ==
- Akademperiodyka, its publisher
- Strength of Materials (journal)
- Ukrainian Journal of Physics

== Sources ==
- Kubijovyč, Volodymyr (1993). "Словникова частина". Енциклопедія українознавства [Encyclopedia of Ukraine] (in Ukrainian). Львів: Naukove T-Vo Im. T. Shevchenka U L'Vovi. ISBN 5-7707-4049-3.
