= Zoodiversity =

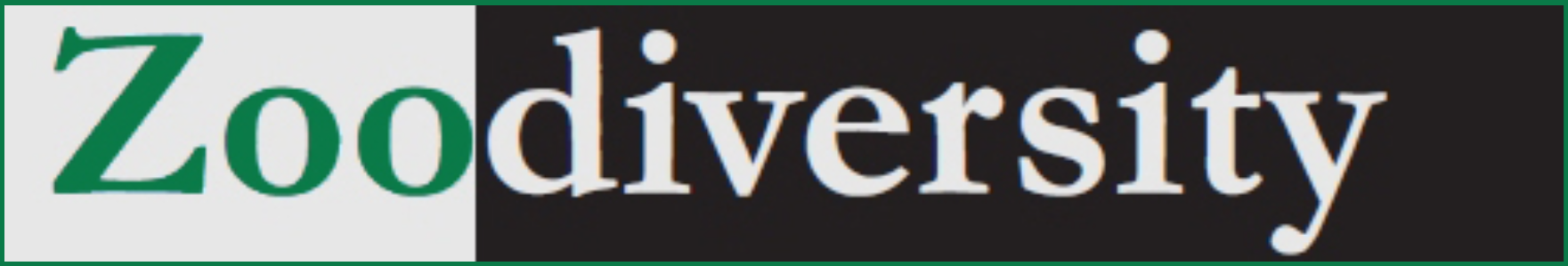
- Discipline: Zoology
- Language: English (until 2019 also Ukrainian, Russian)
- Edited by: I. I. Schmalhausen Institute of Zoology

Publication details
- Former name(s): Vestnik Zoologii; Вестник зоологии
- History: 1967–present
- Publisher: Akademperiodyka (Ukraine)
- Frequency: Bimonthly
- Open access: Yes

Standard abbreviations
- ISO 4: Zoodiversity

Indexing
- ISSN: 2707-725X (print); 2707-7268 (web)

Links
- Journal homepage

Zoodiversity is an academic journal edited by the I. I. Schmalhausen Institute of Zoology of the National Academy of Sciences of Ukraine (NASU), and published by Akademperiodyka.

== History ==
From 1967 until 2019, it was titled Vestnik Zoologii (Russian: Вестник зоологии, romanized: Bulletin of Zoology, and published articles in Ukrainian, English, and Russian. In 2019, the journal was rebranded Zoodiversity, and henceforth issued articles only in English.

== Summary ==
The journal publishes original research in English in all areas of zoology (except for purely applied ones): fauna and systematics, ecology, ethology, descriptive and comparative morphology, physiology, zoological aspects of nature conservation, and so on.

Large works are published as separate issues (Supplements).

The journal is free to access, with all articles and issues since 1967 available on the journal's website.

== Indexing and abstracting ==
Zoodiversity is indexed in Scopus, Thomson Scientific Master Journal list (Philadelphia list), and is abstracted in CAB Abstracts, Biological Abstracts, Zoological Record, Aquatic Science and Fisheries Abstracts (ASFA).

== Editors-in-chief ==
- Ivan Hryhorovych Pidoplichko (1967–1975)
- Vadym Oleksandrovych Topachevskyi (1975–1988)
- Ihor Andriyovych Akimov (1988–2021)
- Vitaliy Oleksandrovych Kharchenko (since 2021)

== See also ==
- Akademperiodyka
- Naukova Dumka
