= Arheologia =

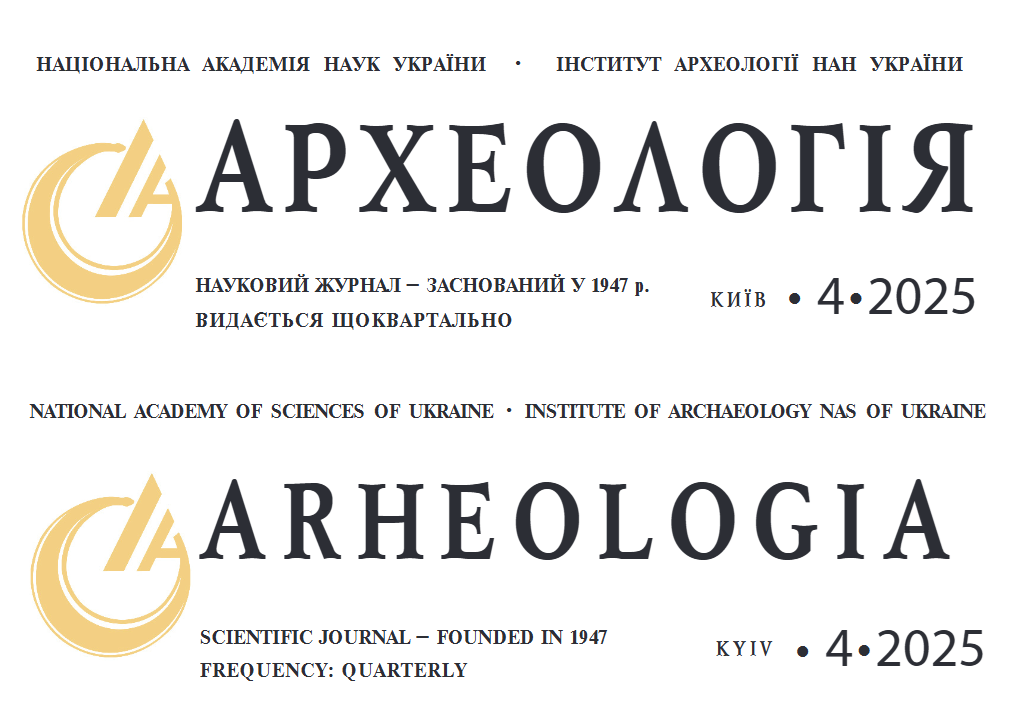
- Title pages of Археологія/Arheologia, issue 4 of the year 2025.
- Discipline: Archaeology
- Language: Ukrainian and English
- Edited by: Viktor Petrovych Chabai

Publication details
- History: 1947–present
- Publisher: Akademperiodyka / Institute of Archaeology of the National Academy of Sciences of Ukraine (Ukraine)
- Frequency: Quarterly
- Open access: Yes

Standard abbreviations
- ISO 4: Arheologia

Indexing
- ISSN: 0235-3490 (print); 2616-499X (web)

Links
- Journal homepage

Arheologia (Ukrainian: Археологія, lit. 'Archaeology') is an academic journal of the Institute of Archaeology of the National Academy of Sciences of Ukraine, which publishes the scientific achievements of the Institute's researchers, Ukrainian scientists and foreign scholars in the field of Ukrainian archaeology. Printing and distribution of Arheologia is conducted by publishing house Akademperiodyka.

== Name and languages ==
Археологія (Arheologia) simply means "archaeology". Its publication languages are Ukrainian and English. Arheologia is the official English transcription of the Ukrainian word Археологія as used by the journal, following obsolete standards (Note: For the word Археологія, the most recent State Standard of Ukraine, DSTU 9112:2021 (implemented on 1 April 2022), prescribes either Arkheoloğija (system A) or Arkheologhija (system B).) for the romanisation of Ukrainian. By comparison, the equivalent word in modern Romanian is arheologie, with a Iași-based Romanian-language journal named Arheologia Moldovei ("Archaeology of Moldavia"), and the Bulgarian journal Археология (founded in 1959) is identically romanised as Arheologia, sometimes indexed with the addition of "(Sofia)" to prevent confusion. Similarly, the Ukrainian journal Arheologia is sometimes indexed with the addition "(Kyiv)", in order to differentiate it from its Bulgarian namesake. The Journal Base of the French National Centre for Scientific Research (CNRS) indexes the journal as Arkheolohiya: zbirnyk naukovykh prats', a transcription of Археологія: збірник наукових праць ("Archaeology: collection of scientific works").

From the first issue of Arheologia in 1947 onwards, papers were published fully in Ukrainian, with summaries initially written in the French language. From the second issue (1948) onwards, summaries were provided in Russian, while cited references contained sources primarily in Ukrainian, Russian, German, Polish, and Latin.

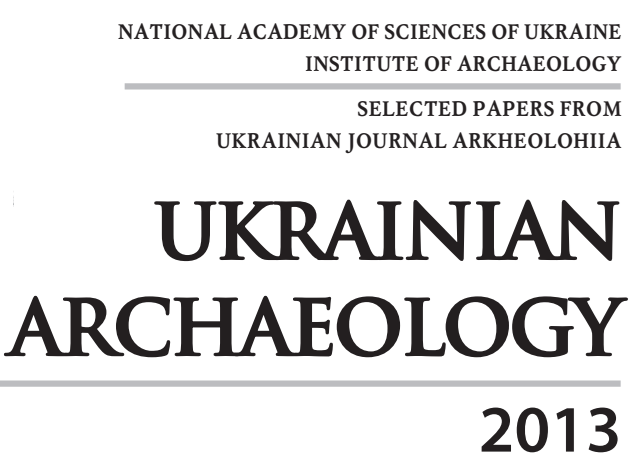
Title page of an English summary of articles from Arheologia (2013).

Summaries in English were included for the first time in issue 1 (March) of 1989, after re-registration of the journal under the new editorship of Petro Tolochko (until 2017). For English-language summaries of articles published in the years 2011–2013, the journal's name was translated as "Ukrainian Archaeology", while the Ukrainian name Археологія was transcribed as Arkheolohiia. By 2016, virtually all articles were still published in Ukrainian, with summaries in English and Russian. By 2019, articles fully in English with summaries in Ukrainian and Russian started to appear. Issue 1 of 2022, published on 23 March 2022 (just after the start of the full-scale Russian invasion of Ukraine on 24 February 2022), was the last edition featuring summaries in Russian; thereafter, Arheologia became a fully bilingual Ukrainian/English journal.

== Scope ==
Arheologia covers theoretical issues related to archaeological research and the study of ancient Ukrainian history from the prehistoric era to the early modern period. It publishes materials on archaeological maps of Ukraine, contains reports on individual important monuments, and provides a chronicle of the scientific life of the Institute of Archaeology and other archaeological institutions in Ukraine.

== History ==
The origins of Arheologia stem from 1924, when the All-Ukrainian Archaeological Committee (VUAK) of the All-Ukrainian Academy of Sciences (ASU) published two issues of Korotki zvidomlennia za diialnist Vseukrainskoho Arheolohichnoho komitetu pry UAN v haluzi arkheolohichnyh doslidiv ("Brief Reports of the Archaeological Research Activity of VUAK ASU"). The Committee, renamed to Institute of Archaeology in 1938, went on to publish several special collective works, but of the intended annual periodical, only one issue of 1930 was published in 1931 under the title Zapysky Vseukrainskoho Arkheolohichnoho Komitetu ("Proceedings of the All-Ukrainian Archaeological Committee").

Arheologia was founded was in 1947 as an annual journal. From 1947 to 1970, volumes 1–24 were published annually, after which it acquired the status of republican interdepartmental scientific collected works edition, and became a quarterly publication from 1971 up to and including 1988 (64 issues). In its current format, the publication has been issued four times a year since its re-registration in 1989.

By the 56th year of its existence in 2003, the publication had published more than 1,500 articles and reports. From 1993 to 2003, individual issues of the journal have been devoted to prominent figures in archaeological science or anniversary dates: the anniversary of the beginning of research into the monuments of the Trypillian culture (No. 3, 1993), Pontic Olbia (No. 2, 1994), the 10th anniversary of the International Association of Academies of Sciences (No. 3, 2003), the 85th anniversary of the National Academy of Sciences of Ukraine (No. 4, 2003), and others.

Since 2017, the editor-in-chief of the journal has been Viktor Petrovych Chabai, director of the Institute of Archaeology, and corresponding member of the National Academy of Sciences of Ukraine.

== Sources ==
- A. I. Bidzilja, "Археологія", in: Ukrainian Soviet Encyclopedia : in 12 volumes. / Chief Editor: M. P. Bazhan; Editorial Board: O. K. Antonov et al. 2nd edition. Kyiv. : Editorial Board of the Ukrainian Soviet Encyclopedia, 1974–1985.
