= Dukh i Litera =

Ukraine publishing house

- Type: Private
- Industry: Media
- Founded: 1992
- Headquarters: Kyiv, Ukraine
- Products: Books
- Website: duh-i-litera.com

Dukh i Litera («Дух і літера», English: “Spirit and Letter”) is a Ukrainian publishing house that was founded in 1992. It is based in National University of Kyiv-Mohyla Academy and operates on a not-for-profit basis. Dukh i Litera publishes scholarly titles in both Ukrainian and Russian, predominantly in the humanities and social sciences. Additionally, Dukh i Litera focuses on publishing books concerning Ukrainian, Jewish, and French history and culture.

Dukh i Litera is the foremost publisher of Jewish Studies works in Ukraine. It has produced the Ukrainian translations of the Oxford Handbook of Jewish Studies, books by Martin Buber, Elie Wiesel, Claude Lanzmann, The Black Book by Vasily Grossman and Ilya Ehrenburg (prohibited in the USSR by censorship of the Stalin times), as well as many other major publications.

== Publications ==
=== Translations ===
- Michel de Montaigne,
- Jean-Jacques Rousseau
- Thomas Hobbes
- Henri Bergson
- Emmanuel Levinas
- Simone Weil
- Paul Ricœur
- Michel Foucault
- Hannah Arendt
- Sylvie Courtine-Denamy
- Christos Yannaras
- Zygmunt Bauman

=== Ukrainian authors ===
- Vasyl Stus
- Ivan Dzyuba
- Mykhailyna Kotsiubynska

== See also ==
- List of publishing companies of Ukraine
