= List of publishing companies of Ukraine =

This is a list of publishing companies in Ukraine.

== List ==
Name	Ukrainian name	City	Logo
Akademperiodyka	Академперіодика	Kyiv	
ArtHuss	ArtHuss	Kyiv	
Caravela	Caravela	Kyiv	
Discursus	Discursus	Brustury	
Komubook	Komubook	Kyiv	
Laurus Press	Laurus Press	Kyiv	
Nebo Booklab Publishing	Nebo Booklab Publishing	Kyiv	
New Time Books	New Time Books	Kharkiv	
Meridian Czernowitz	Meridian Czernowitz	Chernivtsi	
Port-Royal	Port-Royal	Kyiv	
Terra Incognita	Terra Incognita	Lviv	
Vivat	Vivat	Kharkiv	
Vydavnytstvo	Vydavnytstvo	Zhytomyr	
A-ba-ba-ha-la-ma-ha	А-ба-ба-га-ла-ма-га	Kyiv	
A.S.K	А.С.К	Kyiv	
Abrys	Абрис	Kyiv	
Averse	Аверс	Lviv	
ADEF-Ukraine	АДЕФ-Україна	Kyiv	
Azimuth-Ukraine	Азимут-Україна	Kyiv	
Ailanthus	Айлант	Kherson	
Akademyvav	Академвидав	Kyiv	
Academy	Академія	Kyiv	
Aconite	Аконіт	Kyiv	
Akta	Акта	Kharkiv	
Alerta	Алерта	Kyiv	
Alternatives	Альтернативи	Kyiv	
Alterpress	Альтерпрес	Kyiv	
Alpha-M	Альфа-М	Kyiv	
Alpha-Print	Альфа-Принт	Kyiv	
Amadeus	Амадей	Kyiv	
Apostle	Апостол	Ivano-Frankivsk	
Apriori	Апріорі	Lviv	
Arius	Арій	Kyiv	
Art	Арт	Kyiv	
Artania New	Артанія Нова	Kyiv	
ArtEk	АртЕк	Kyiv	
ArtEconomy	АртЕкономі	Kyiv	
Art Complex	Арт-Комплекс	Lviv	
AS	АС	Kyiv	
Aspect	Аспект	Kyiv	
ASSA	АССА	Kharkiv	
Aston	Астон	Ternopil	
ASTpress-Dixie	АСТпрес-Діксі	Kyiv	
Astrolabia	Астролябія	Lviv	
Astroprint	Астропринт	Odesa	
Attica	Атіка	Kyiv	
Atoll	Атолл	Kyiv	
Afisha	Афіша	Lviv	
BaK	БаК	Lviv	
Baltic-Press	Балтія-Друк	Kyiv	
BAO	БАО	Donetsk	
Library of a Ukrainian	Бібліотека українця	Kyiv	
White Tower	Біла Вежа	Kyiv	
White Tiger	Білий Тигр	Kyiv	
Squirrel	Білка	Kyiv	
Bombat Game	Бомбат Гейм	Kyiv	
Number & Letter	Буква і Цифра	Kyiv	
Bukrek	Букрек	Chernivtsi	
Brilliant Contract	Блискучий договір	Krasnyi Luch	
Bright Star Publishing	Брайт Стар Паблішинг	Kyiv	
Wakler	Ваклер	Kyiv	
Varta	Варта	Kyiv	
Varto	Варто	Kyiv	
Tower	Вежа	Lutsk	
Veles	Велес	Kyiv	
Rainbow	Веселка	Kyiv	
Vesko	Веско	Donetsk	
Spring	Весна	Kharkiv	
From the Bunny	Від Зайчика	Kyiv	
Renaissance	Відродження	Drohobych	
Viva-Print	Віва-Принт	Kyiv	
Century	Вік	Kyiv	
Vikar	Вікар	Kyiv	
Free Ukraine	Вільна Україна	Kyiv	
Vipol	Віпол	Kyiv	
Ostap Khanko Publishing	Видавець Остап Ханко	Kyiv	
Publisher Oleksandr Savchuk	Видавець Олександр Савчук	Kharkiv	
Anetta Antonenko Publishing House	Видавництво Анетти Антоненко	Kyiv	
Humanities Literature Publishing House	Видавництво гуманітарної літератури	Kyiv	
Zhupansky Publishing House	Видавництво Жупанського	Kyiv	
KNEU Publishing House	Видавництво КНЕУ	Kyiv	
Lviv Polytechnic Publishing House	Видавництво Львівської політехніки	Lviv	
MAUP Publishing House	Видавництво МАУП	Kyiv	
Valeriy Padyaka Publishing House	Видавництво Валерія Падяка	Uzhhorod	
Serhiy Pantyuk Publishing House	Видавництво Сергія Пантюка	Kyiv	
Podyillya Publishing House	Видавництво Поділля	Vinnytsia	
Publishing House of Political Literature of Ukraine	Видавництво політичної літератури України	Kyiv	
Old Lion Publishing House	Видавництво Старого Лева	Lviv	
Publishing House of the Ukrainian Academy of Printing	Видавництво Української академії друкарства	Lviv	
Kherson State Maritime Institute Publishing House	Видавництво Херсонського державного морського інституту	Kherson	
The Publishing House	Видавничий дім	Kryvyi Rih	
Highest School	Вища школа	Kyiv	
Vladoslov	Владослов	Kyiv	
VNTL-Classic	ВНТЛ-Класика	Lviv	
Volyn	Волинь	Rivne	
Volya	Воля	Kyiv	
Voskresinnya	Воскресіння	Kyiv	
Vsesvit	Всесвіт	Kyiv	
HalDent	ГалДент	Lviv	
Galician Publishing Union	Галицька видавнича спілка	Lviv	
Helikon	Гелікон	Kyiv	
Helvetica	Гельветика	Kherson	
Heneza	Генеза	Kyiv	
Geoprint	Геопринт	Kyiv	
Herda	Герда	Dnipro	
Hyperion	Гіперіон	Kyiv	
Glowberry Books	Глоуберрі Букс	Kyiv	
Hraylik	Грайлик	Kyiv	
Hrono	Гроно	Kyiv	
Hrani	Грані	Dnipro	
Hrani-T	Грані-Т	Kyiv	
Grazhda	Ґражда	Uzhhorod	
Dakor	Дакор	Kyiv	
State Publishing House	Держлітвидав	Kyiv	
Derzhtekhvydav	Держтехвидав	Kharkiv	
Desnyanska Pravda	Деснянська правда	Chernihiv	
Diana Plus	Діана плюс	Ternopil	
Diya	Дія	Kyiv	
Dim Khymer	Дім Химер	Vinnytsia	
J. J.	Дж. Дж.	Kyiv	
Dzherela M	Джерела М	Kyiv	
Dzhura	Джура	Ternopil	
Wild Field	Дике Поле	Zaporizhzhia	
Dnipro	Дніпро	Kyiv	
National Business Press	Ділова преса країни	Kyiv	
Good Thing	Добра справа	Lviv	
Good Heart	Добре серце	Drohobych	
Trust	Довіра	Kyiv	
Fate	Доля	Simferopol	
Don-97	Дон-97	Kyiv	
Donbas	Донбас	Donetsk	
DTP	ДТП	Vinnytsia	
Duliby	Дуліби	Kyiv	
Duh i Litera	Дух і Літера	Kyiv	
Ezra	Ездра	Oleksandriia	
EKO-Inform	ЕКО-інформ	Kyiv	
Etnos	Етнос	Kyiv	
Cooperative	Задруга	Kyiv	
Health	Здоров'я	Kyiv	
Green Dog	Зелений пес	Kyiv	
Land	Земля	Kherson	
Knowledge	Знання	Kyiv	
Knowledge of Ukraine	Знання України	Kyiv	
Zoloti Lytavry	Золоті литаври	Chernivtsi	
ZooBook	Зоокнига	Kyiv	
In Yure	Ін Юре	Kyiv	
Intelligence West	Інтелект — Захід	Lviv	
Intelsphere	Інтелсфера	Kyiv	
Interbook	Інтербук	Zaporizhzhia	
Evident	Істина	Kyiv	
Institute of Advanced Technologies	Інститут передових технологій	Kyiv	
Institute of the Modern Textbook	Інститут сучасного підручника	Kyiv	
Kazka	Казка	Kyiv	
Kairos	Кайрос	Kyiv	
Calvary	Кальварія	Lviv	
Kamenyar	Каменяр	Lviv	
Hat	Капелюх	Kyiv	
Carpathians	Карпати	Uzhhorod	
Carpathian Tower	Карпатська вежа	Mukachevo	
Carte Blanche	Карт-бланш	Ternopil	
Cartography	Картографія	Kyiv	
Kashalot	Кашалот	Ivano-Frankivsk	
Chestnut	Каштан	Donetsk	
Kyiv-Mohyla Academy Publishing House	Видавничий дім «Києво-Могилянська академія»	Kyiv	
K.I.S.	К.І.С.	Kyiv	
Kyivan Truth	Київська правда	Kyiv	
Kyi	Кий	Kyiv	
Classic	Класика	Lviv	
Clio	Кліо	Kyiv	
KM-Academy	КМ-Академія	Kyiv	
KM-Books	КМ-Букс	Kyiv	
Book Plus	Книга Плюс	Kyiv	
21st Century Books	Книги XXI	Chernivtsi	
KnyhoVyr	КнигоВир	Lviv	
Knyholav	Книголав	Kyiv	
Knyhonosha	Книгоноша	Kyiv	
Book Publishing House of Oleksiy Kapusta	Книжкове видавництво Олексія Капусти	Kyiv	
Family Leisure Club	Клуб сімейного дозвілля	Kharkiv	
Compass	Компас	Kherson	
Condor	Кондор	Kyiv	
Kolo	Коло	Drohobych	
Coloryt	Колорит	Kharkiv	
Kompas	Компас	Kyiv	
Consortium for Improving Management Education in Ukraine	Консорціум із удосконалення менеджмент-освіти в Україні	Kyiv	
Consum	Консум	Kharkiv	
Country of Angels	Країна ангелят	Lviv	
Kray	Край	Kyiv	
Kredo	Кредо	Donetsk	
Krynytsya	Криниця	Kyiv	
Krytyka	Критика	Kyiv	
Step	Крок	Ternopil	
Krona	Крона	Vinnytsia	
Kurs	Курс	Kyiv	
KVITS	КВІЦ	Kyiv	
Landon 21st	ЛАНДОН-XXI	Donetsk	
Stork	Лелека	Kyiv	
Lesya	Леся	Kyiv	
Lybid	Либідь	Kyiv	
Libra	Лібра	Kyiv	
League-Press	Ліга-прес	Lviv	
Lily	Лілія	Khmelnytskyi	
Lileya-NV	Лілея-НВ	Uzhhorod	
Lileya	Лілея	Ternopil	
LIPS	ЛІПС	Zaporizhzhia	
Lira-K	Ліра-К	Kyiv	
Letter	Ліста	Rivne	
Letter LTD	Літера ЛТД	Kyiv	
Litopys	Літопис	Lviv	
Logos Ukraine	Логос Україна	Kyiv	
LUx-PRINT	ЛЮКС-ПРИНТ	Donetsk	
Lyuta Sprava	Люта справа	Kyiv	
Lviv State University of Physical Culture	Львівський державний університет фізичної культури імені Івана Боберського	Lviv	
Mahistr	Магістр	Kharkiv	
Madzhuha	Маджуга	Cherkasy	
Maidan	Майдан	Kyiv	
Mandrivets	Мандрівець	Ternopil	
MAPA	МАПА	Kyiv	
Stamp of Ukraine	Марка України	Kyiv	
Makhaon-Ukraine	Махаон-Україна	Kyiv	
Lighthouse	Маяк	Kyiv	
Medicine	Медицина	Kyiv	
Meta	Мета	Lviv	
Art	Мистецтво	Kyiv	
Art Line	Мистецька лінія	Uzhhorod	
Missioner	Місіонер	Lviv	
City	Місто	Chernivtsi	
Young Bukovinian	Молодий буковинець	Chernivtsi	
Young Scientist	Молодий вчений	Kherson	
Youth	Молодь	Kyiv	
Morion	Моріон	Kyiv	
Moyabook	Moyabook	Kyiv	
Musical Ukraine	Музична Україна	Kyiv	
Strelbytsky Multimedia Publishing House	Мультимедійне видавництво Стрельбицького	Kyiv	
Navchalna Book	Навчальна Книга	Kyiv	
Bohdan Books	Навчальна книга — Богдан	Ternopil	
Naddnipryanochka	Наддніпряночка	Kherson	
Nadstyrya	Надстир'я	Lutsk	
Folk Art	Народне Мистецтво	Ivano-Frankivsk	
Naukova Dumka	Наукова думка	Kyiv	
Scientific World	Науковий світ	Kyiv	
Nautilus	Наутілус	Kyiv	
National Book Project	Національний книжковий проект	Kyiv	
Our Format	Наш Формат	Kyiv	
Our Time	Наш час	Kyiv	
Nika-Centre	Ніка-Центр	Kyiv	
New Dawn	Нова зоря	Ivano-Frankivsk	
New Book	Нова книга	Vinnytsia	
Nora-Druk	Нора-Друк	Kyiv	
New Time	Нью Тайм	Kharkiv	
Oberehy	Обереги	Kyiv	
Oberih	Оберіг	Kharkiv	
Odex Plus	Одекс Плюс	Kyiv	
Oko	Око	Kharkiv	
Oldi+	Олді+	Kherson	
Optima	Оптима	Kyiv	
Orientyr	Орієнтир	Kyiv	
Oriana	Оріяна	Poltava	
Orians	Оріяни	Kyiv	
Osvita	Освіта	Kyiv	
Education of Ukraine	Освіта України	Kyiv	
Osnova	Основа	Kharkiv	
Osnovy	Основи	Kyiv	
Core Values	Основні цінності	Kyiv	
Olsha Publishing	Olsha Publishing	Kherson	
Pais	Паіс	Lviv	
Panorama (Lviv)	Панорама	Lviv	
Panorama (Mukachevo)	Панорама	Mukachevo	
Parliamentary Publishing House	Парламентське видавництво	Kyiv	
Pehas	Пегас	Kharkiv	
Pedagogical Press	Педагогічна преса	Kyiv	
Personal	Персонал	Kyiv	
Perun	Перун	Irpin	
Northern Lights	Північні вогні	Kyiv	
Textbooks and Manuals	Підручники і посібники	Ternopil	
Pyramid	Піраміда	Lviv	
Painted Stone	Писаний камінь	Kosiv	
Planet	Планета	Kyiv	
Polygraph Service	Поліграфсервіс	Hlobyne	
Polissya	Полісся	Zhytomyr	
Poltava	Полтава	Poltava	
Poltavan Literator	Полтавський літератор	Poltava	
Pomona books	Pomona books	Kherson	
Porohy	Пороги	Dnipro	
Portal Books	Портал	Kyiv	
Elementary School	Початкова школа	Kyiv	
Prime	Прайм	Kyiv	
Right	Право	Kharkiv	
Flag	Прапор	Kharkiv	
The Press of Ukraine	Преса України	Kyiv	
Prestige Media Inform	Престиж Медіа Інформ	Kyiv	
Promin	Промінь	Kharkiv	
Prosvita	Просвіта	Kyiv	
Prosvita of Kherson Oblast	Просвіта Херсонщини	Kherson	
Professional	Професіонал	Kyiv	
Prut Print	Прут Принт	Sniatyn	
Pulsary	Пульсари	Kyiv	
Drunk Ship Publishing	П'яний корабель	Ivano-Frankivsk	
Rada	Рада	Kyiv	
Ukrainian Writer	Український письменник	Kyiv	
Morning	Ранок	Kharkiv	
Renata	Рената	Mariupol	
Year	Рік	Poltava	
Podovid	Родовід	Kyiv	
Smart Kid Publishing House	Розумна дитина	Kyiv	
Movement	Рух	Kharkiv	
Summit Book	Саміт-книга	Kyiv	
Safran	Сафран	Kyiv	
Svenas	Свенас	Kyiv	
Svit	Світ	Lviv	
World of Children	Світ дитини	Lviv	
World of Knowledge	Світ знань	Kyiv	
Svitych	Світич	Kyiv	
Svichado	Свічадо	Lviv	
Symphony	Симфонія	Ivano-Frankivsk	
Siveryanska Dumka	Сіверянська думка	Chernihiv	
Syntax	Сінтекс	Kharkiv	
Sich	Січ	Dnipro	
Sower	Сіяч	Cherkasy	
Skykom	Скайком	Romyn	
Scanner	Сканнер	Kyiv	
SKD	СКД	Pereiaslav	
SKIF	СКІФ	Lviv	
SLAZH	СЛАЖ	Kherson	
Slavic Gate	Слов'янська Брама	Kyiv	
SMILE	СМАЙЛ	Kharkiv	
Smirna	Смірна	Cherkasy	
Smoloskyp	Смолоскип	Kyiv	
Sonat	Сонат	Simferopol	
Sunflower Books	Соняшник	Kharkiv	
Sophia	Софія	Kyiv	
Spalakh	Спалах	Kyiv	
Spolom	Сполом	Lviv	
Silver Word	Срібне слово	Lviv	
Stavropihion	Ставропігіон	Lviv	
STATUS	СТАТУС	Zaporizhzhia	
Harmony Structures Publishing	Структури Гармонії	Poltava	
Stylos	Стилос	Kyiv	
Stebelyak F.O.P.	Стебеляк ФОП	Kyiv	
Modern Writer	Сучасний письменник	Kyiv	
Sphere	Сфера	Kyiv	
Syayvo	Сяйво	Kyiv	
Eastern Publishing House	Східний видавничий дім	Donetsk	
Tavria	Таврія	Simferopol	
Tandem	Тандем	Kyiv	
Teza	Теза	Vinnytsia	
Tempora	Темпора	Kyiv	
Tekhnika	Техніка	Kyiv	
Tipovit	Тіповіт	Ivano-Frankivsk	
Tomiris	Томіріс	Kyiv	
Torsing	Торсінг	Kharkiv	
Treant	Треант	Kyiv	
Tretyak	Третяк	Ivano-Frankivsk	
UZHDRUK	УЖДРУК	Uzhhorod	
Ukraine	Україна	Kyiv	
Ukrainian Publishing Union	Українська видавнича спілка	Kyiv	
Ukrainian Encyclopedia	Українська енциклопедія	Kyiv	
Ukrainian Press	Українська преса	Kyiv	
Ukrainian National Culture	Українське народознавство	Opishnya	
Ukrainian Centre of Spiritual Culture	Український центр духовної культури	Kyiv	
Ukrainian Centre for Political Management	Український центр політичного менеджменту	Kyiv	
Ukrainski Propileyi	Українські пропілеї	Kyiv	
Ukrainian Medical Books	Укрмедкнига	Ternopil	
Ukrpol	Укрпол	Stryi	
University Book	Університетська книга	Sumy	
Universum	Універсум	Lviv	
Universum Vinnytsia	Універсум Вінниця	Vinnytsia	
Urbino	Урбіно	Lviv	
Harvest	Урожай	Kyiv	
Fable Book	Фабула	Kharkiv	
Factor	Фактор	Kharkiv	
Fact	Факт	Kyiv	
Fares	Фарес	Kyiv	
Phoenix	Фенікс	Kyiv	
Phoenix Lviv	Фенікс Львів	Lviv	
Folio	Фоліо	Kharkiv	
Fountain of Stories	Фонтан казок	Kyiv	
Khortytsya	Хортиця	Lviv	
The Christian Word	Християнське Слово	Krasyliv	
Centre of Europe	Центр Європи	Lviv	
Centre Practical Philosophy	Центр практичної філософії	Kyiv	
Centre for Social Communications	Центр соціальних комунікацій	Kyiv	
Centre for Educational Literature	Центр учбової літератури	Kyiv	
Time	Час	Kyiv	
Chervona Kalyna	Червона Калина	Lviv	
The Fourth Wave	Четверта хвиля	Kyiv	
Milky Way	Чумацький шлях	Kyiv	
Shamray	Шамрай	Mykolaiv	
Schoolbook	Школа	Kharkiv	
Stroke	Штрих	Kharkiv	
Thing	Штучка	Kyiv	
World of School	Шкільний світ	Kyiv	
Universe Books	Юніверс	Kyiv	
Legal Thought	Юридична думка	Kyiv	
Yurinkom Inter	Юрінком Інтер	Kyiv	
Yanina	Яніна	Bila Tserkva	
Yaroslaviv Val	Ярославів Вал	Kyiv	
