= The Effects of Cross and Self Fertilisation in the Vegetable Kingdom =

1876 book by Charles Darwin

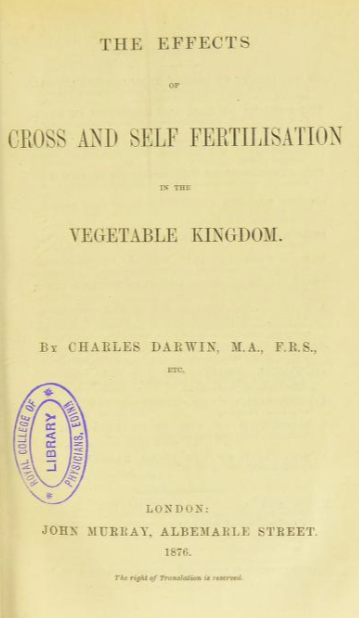
- Title page for The Effects of Cross and Self Fertilisation in the Vegetable Kingdom (1876)
- Author: Charles Darwin
- Subject: Evolution of plants; cross and self fertilisation
- Genre: Non-fiction
- Publication date: 1876

The Effects of Cross and Self Fertilisation in the Vegetable Kingdom is a book on evolution in plants by Charles Darwin, first published in 1876. In this book Darwin examines the effects of cross and self fertilisation of plants and provides experimental evidence for a hypothesis stated in his famed book of 1859, Origin of Species, that "... in none [i.e. plant] [...]can self-fertilisation go on for perpetuity" (Origin, p. 101). He reports on experiments conducted on over 60 different species of plants, where he used controlled pollinations in order to produce self-fertilised and cross-fertilised descendants. Through growth experiments of this progeny, he concluded that self-fertilised progeny performed poorer in most species and for most traits measured. Thus he showed that inbreeding may have severe detrimental effects on progeny. While this idea was accepted by many, e.g. plant and animal breeders, Darwin's book provided overwhelming experimental support for this idea. This book has remained the starting point for the study of inbreeding and is cited in scientific papers to this effect to this day.

Darwin's 1876 book is referenced in this 1934 paper in the Ukrainian Botanical Journal "On the biology of blossoming in the sugar beet".
