= NASU Institute of Cryobiology and Cryomedicine Issues =

Scientific institute in Kharkiv, Ukraine

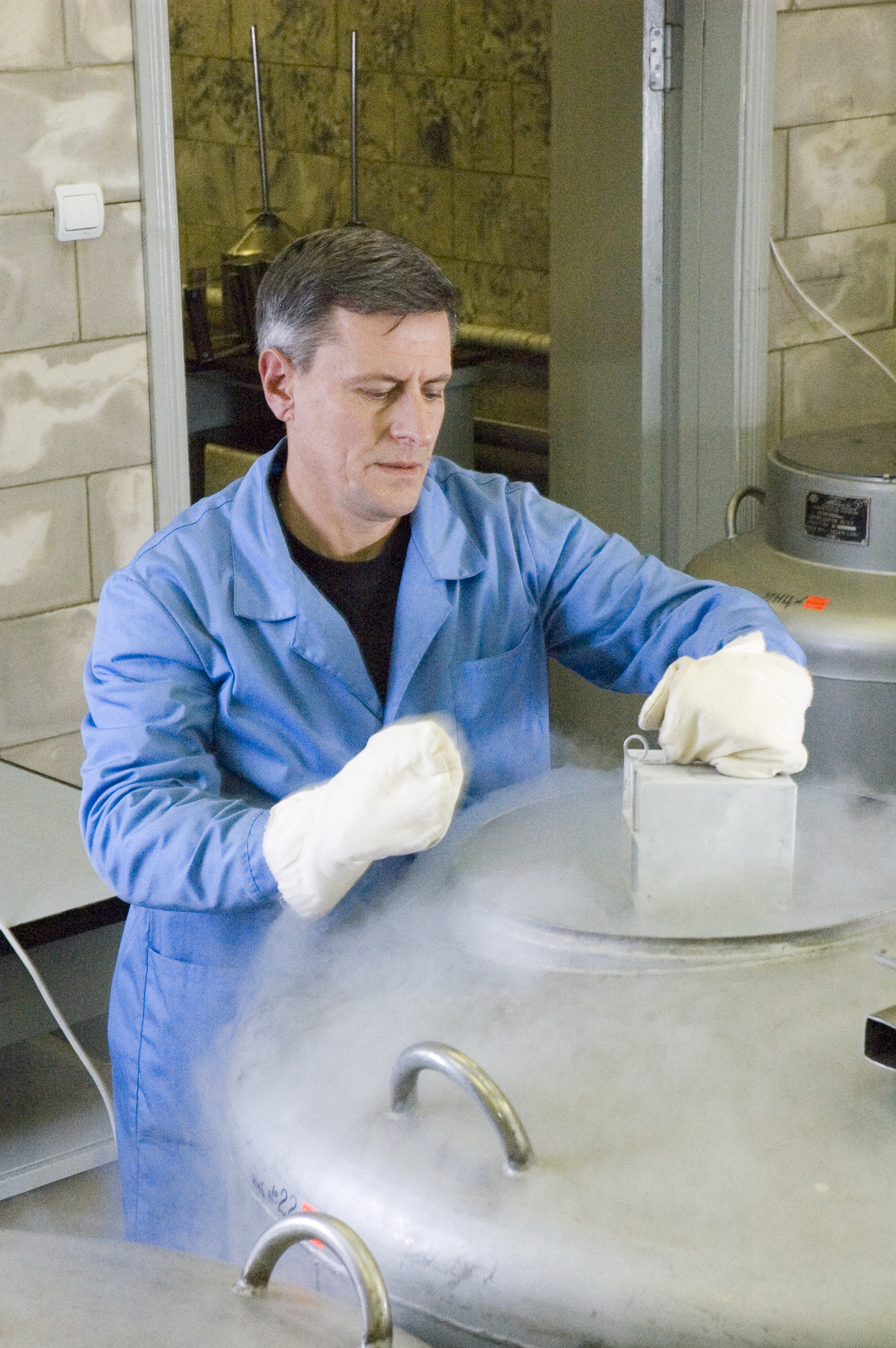
Low temperature bank, Institute for Problems of Cryobiology and Cryomedicine of the National Academy of Sciences of Ukraine

The Institute for Problems of Cryobiology and Cryomedicine in Kharkiv is one of the institutes of the National Academy of Science of Ukraine, and is the largest institute devoted to cryobiology research in the world.

== Background ==
Established in 1972, the focus of the research is on cryoinjury, cryosurgery, cryopreservation, lyophilization and hypothermia. Since 1985 the Institute has published the open access peer-reviewed scientific journal Problems of Cryobiology and Cryomedicine.

== See also ==
- Cryobiology
- National Academy of Science of Ukraine
