= Strength of Materials (journal) =

- Discipline: Materials science
- Language: English and Ukrainian (historically also Russian)
- Edited by: V.V. Kharchenko

Publication details
- History: 1969–present
- Publisher: Springer Science+Business Media on behalf of the Pisarenko Institute of Problems of Strength of the National Academy of Sciences of Ukraine
- Frequency: Bimonthly
- Impact factor: 0.620 (2020)

Standard abbreviations
- ISO 4: Strength Mater.

Indexing
- CODEN: SMTLB5
- ISSN: 0039-2316 (print); 1573-9325 (web)
- LCCN: sf80001517
- OCLC no.: 1766613

Links
- Journal homepage; Online archive; Journal page at institute's website

Strength of Materials (Ukrainian: Проблеми міцності) is a bimonthly peer-reviewed scientific journal covering the field of strength of materials and structural elements, mechanics solid deformed body. It was established in 1969 and is published by Springer Science+Business Media on behalf of the Pisarenko Institute of Problems of Strength of the National Academy of Sciences of Ukraine, as well as Akademperiodyka. The editor-in-chief is V.V. Kharchenko. According to the Journal Citation Reports, the journal has a 2020 impact factor of 0.620.

Historically, the journal was published trilingually in Russian (as Проблемы прочности), Ukrainian (as Проблеми міцності) and English (as Strength of Materials); in the 21st century, this shifted towards bilingual Ukrainian/English.
