= Naukova Dumka =

Publishing house in Kyiv, Ukraine

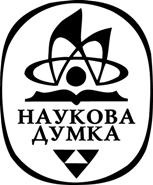
- Industry: Publishing
- Founded: 1922
- Defunct: 2024 (succeeded by Akademperiodyka)
- Headquarters: Tereschenkivska St.3, Kyiv, 01601, Ukraine
- Products: Books
- Website: http://www.ndumka.kiev.ua/

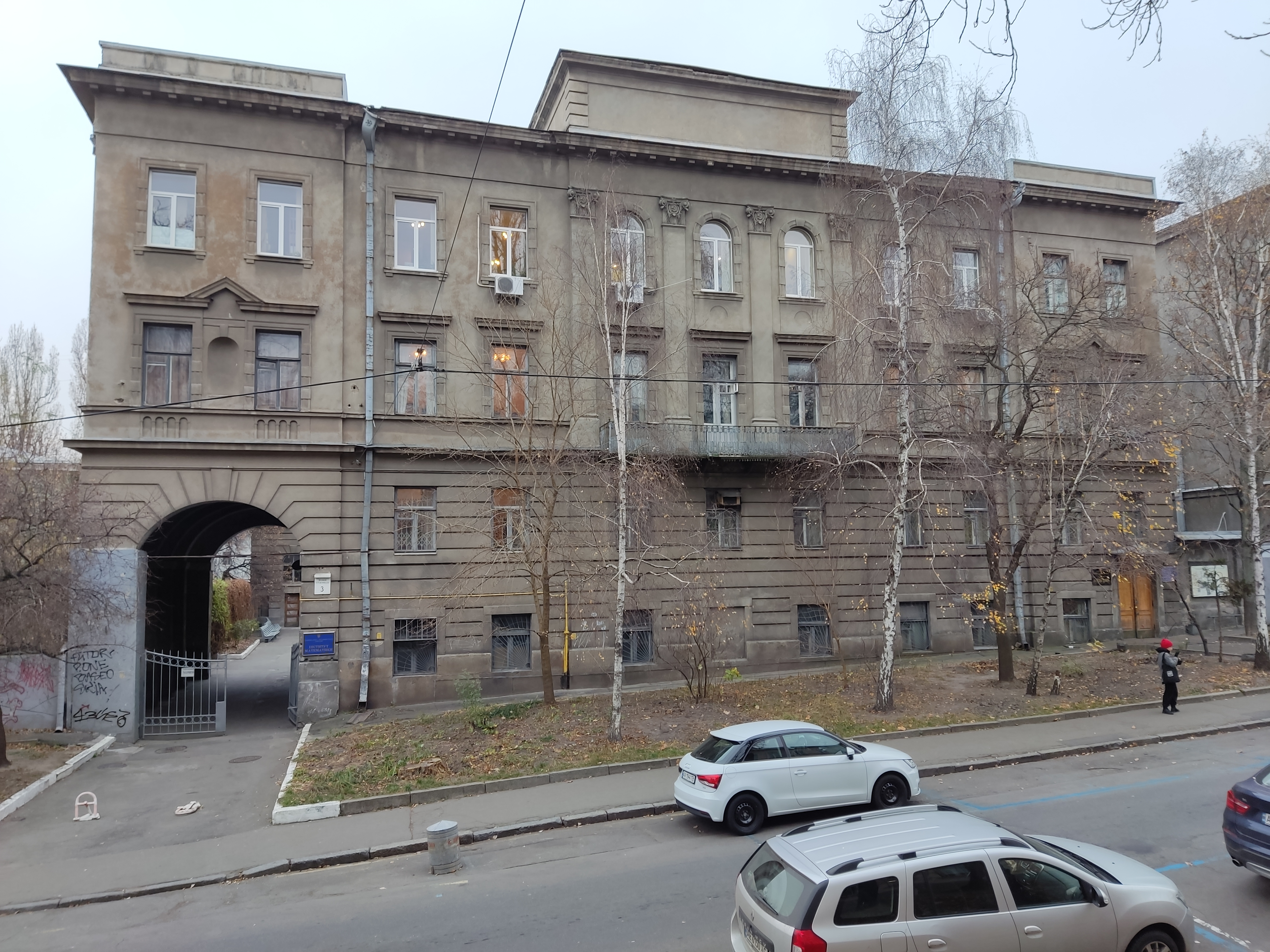
NASU Institute of Mathematics building, with the entrance to Naukova Dumka in the lower right corner (pictured 2021).

Naukova Dumka (Ukrainian: Наукова Думка, lit. 'Scientific Thought') was a publishing house in Kyiv, Ukraine from 1922 to 2024.

It was established by the National Academy of Sciences of Ukraine in 1922, largely owing to the efforts of Ahatanhel Krymsky, a prominent Ukrainian linguist and orientalist. It was one of the oldest scientific and academic publishing houses in the former Soviet Union and became known as Naukova Dumka in 1964, before which it simply functioned as the official publisher of the National Academy of Sciences of Ukraine. It continued its operations in Ukraine, publishing primarily scientific and historical works as well as dictionaries.

Naukova Dumka was housed in the building of the NASU Institute of Mathematics in Tereschenkivska street 3 in Kyiv until December 2024, when it was liquidated as a legal entity, and its activities were moved to publishing house Akademperiodyka (founded in 2001) across the street at Tereschenkivska 4.

== Products ==
“Naukova Dumka” has published dictionaries of synonyms of the Ukrainian language, foreign language words, proper names, established phrases, and spelling dictionaries.

In 1997, the publishing house launched the Schoolchild's Library series, which published works by Ulas Samchuk, Vasyl Barka, Ivan Bahrianyi, Todosiy Osmachka, Volodymyr Vynnychenko, and other representatives of Ukrainian literature whose names had not been mentioned in any Ukrainian literature program for many years.

The publishing house is especially proud of the complete 20-volume collection of Taras Shevchenko's works.

In 2008, 95 titles of fundamental and generalizing scientific works by Ukrainian scholars were published.

In 2010, the publication of the Dictionary of the Ukrainian Language in 20 volumes was launched.

== See also ==
- List of publishing companies of Ukraine
