= List of battles involving the Ukrainian People's Republic =

This is a list of battles involving the Ukrainian People's Republic. The battles conducted by the Ukrainian People's Republic (UPR, UNR) were part of a complex of simultaneously fought wars at the tail of World War I, including the Ukrainian War of Independence, the Russian Civil War, the Ukrainian–Soviet War, the Polish–Ukrainian War (primarily conducted by its ally, the West Ukrainian People's Republic and its Ukrainian Galician Army), and the Polish–Soviet War (in which the UPR was allied with the Second Polish Republic).

Dates are in New Style, unless stated otherwise.

Date	Battle	Combatant 1	Combatant 2	Result
8–13 November 1917	Kiev Bolshevik Uprising	(Russian Soviet Federative Socialist Republic) Bolshevik Revkom Kiev; Ukrainian People's Republic	Kiev Military District	Bolshevik–UPR victory
30 November – 1 December 1917	Odesa Arsenal November Uprising	Ukrainian People's Republic	(Russian Soviet Federative Socialist Republic) Red Guards	UPR victory
11 – 12 December 1917	Kiev November uprising (1917)	Ukrainian People's Republic	(Russian Soviet Federative Socialist Republic) Bolshevik Revkom Kiev	UPR victory
19 December 1917 – 10 January 1918	Occupation of Kharkiv (1917)	Ukrainian People's Republic	(Russian Soviet Federative Socialist Republic) Soviet Russia; Ukrainian People's Republic of Soviets	Soviet victory
25 December 1917 – 2 January 1918	Aleksandrovsk Bolshevik Uprising	Ukrainian People's Republic	Ukrainian People's Republic of Soviets	Soviet victory
End December 1917 – March 1918	Battle of Zhmerynka	Ukrainian People's Republic; Austria-Hungary	(Russian Soviet Federative Socialist Republic) Soviet Russia	UPR–AH victory
9–11 January 1918	Ekaterinoslav Bolshevik uprising	Ukrainian People's Republic	(Russian Soviet Federative Socialist Republic) Bolshevik Revkom Yekaterinoslav	Bolshevik victory
27 – 30 January 1918	Odessa Bolshevik uprising	Ukrainian People's Republic	(Russian Soviet Federative Socialist Republic) Bolshevik Rumcherod	Bolshevik victory
29 or 30 January 1918	Battle of Kruty	Ukrainian People's Republic	(Russian Soviet Federative Socialist Republic) Soviet Russia	UPR victory
29 January 1918 – 4 February 1918	Kiev Arsenal January Uprising	Ukrainian People's Republic	(Russian Soviet Federative Socialist Republic) Bolshevik Red Guards	UPR victory
19 January 1918 — 20 January 1919	Occupation of Poltava by the Bolsheviks	Ukrainian People's Republic	(Russian Soviet Federative Socialist Republic) Soviet Russia	Soviet victory
5–8 February 1918	Battle of Kiev (1918)	Ukrainian People's Republic	(Russian Soviet Federative Socialist Republic) Soviet Russia	Soviet victory
18 February – 3 March 1918	Operation Faustschlag (part of the 1918 Central Powers occupation of Ukraine)	German Empire; Austria-Hungary; Ukrainian People's Republic	Russian Soviet Republic; Ukrainian People's Republic of Soviets	German–AH–UPR victory
13–25 April 1918	Crimea Operation (1918) (part of the 1918 Central Powers occupation of Ukraine)	German Empire; Ukrainian People's Republic; Crimean People's Republic	Taurida Soviet Socialist Republic	German–UPR–Crimean victory
29–30 April 1918	1918 Ukrainian coup d'état (part of the 1918 Central Powers occupation of Ukraine)	Ukrainian People's Republic: Central Rada	Hetmanate movement German Empire	Hetmanate victory
16 November – 15 December 1918	Anti-Hetman Uprising (part of the 1918 Central Powers occupation of Ukraine)	Ukrainian People's Republic: Directorate; Revolutionary Insurgent Army of Ukraine; Green armies; Russian SFSR; Left Socialist-Revolutionaries	Ukrainian State: Hetmanate movement; (Russian Empire) Volunteer Army; (Weimar Republic) Imperial German Army (Note: Though the Weimar Republic was uninvolved in the conflict, German soldiers present in Ukraine following the end of World War I intervened to prevent the Directorate from taking Kyiv.)	UPR victory
18 November 1918	Battle of Motovilivka (part of the 1918 Central Powers occupation of Ukraine)	Ukrainian People's Republic	Hetmanate movement	UPR victory
18 November 1918 – March 1919	Soviet westward offensive of 1918–1919	Russian State (1918–1920); Estonia; Latvia; Lithuania; Belarusian Democratic Republic; Second Polish Republic; Kingdom of Romania; Ukrainian People's Republic; French Third Republic; United Kingdom; Ober Ost; Finnish, Danish, and Swedish volunteers	Russian SFSR; Soviet Estonia; Soviet Latvia; Lithuanian-Byelorussian SSR; Provisional Polish Rewkom; Ukrainian SSR; Finnish Red Guards	Soviet victory in Eastern Belorussia Soviet defeat in the Baltic states and Western Belorussia Start of the Polish–Soviet War
2 January – 31 August 1919	1919 Soviet invasion of Ukraine	Nationalists: Ukrainian People's Republic; West Ukrainian PR; Independent Medvyn Republic; Kholodny Yar Republic; White movement & Allies: South Russia; Crimean Regional Govt; French Third Republic; Kingdom of Greece; Second Polish Republic	Soviets: Russian SFSR; Ukrainian SSR; Crimean SSR; Communist partisans: Green Army (Note: Allied with the Bolsheviks until February, when it rebelled.); Hryhorivshchyna (Note: Part of the 3rd Ukrainian Soviet Army until May, when it launched an anti-Bolshevik uprising in Kherson.); Makhnovshchyna (Note: Part of the 2nd Ukrainian Soviet Army until June, when it resigned its position.)	Soviet defeat Hryhoriv and Makhnov partisans rebel against Soviet command Whites with Allied help win in the Donbas, capture Kiev and advance on Moscow Poland occupies Volhynia and Galicia
7 January – 1 February 1919	Khotyn Uprising	Ukrainian and Moldovan insurgents Supported by: (Russian Empire) Committee for the Salvation of Bessarabia; (Russian Empire) Volunteer Army (logistical support); Ukrainian People's Republic	Kingdom of Romania	Romanian victory
18 January – 5 February 1919	Battle of Kiev (January 1919)	Ukrainian People's Republic	Russian SFSR	Soviet victory
31 August 1919	Capture of Kiev by the White Army	Ukrainian People's Republic Russian SFSR; Ukrainian SSR	South Russia (White Army): Armed Forces of South Russia	AFSR victory
6 December 1919 – 6 May 1920	First Winter Campaign	Ukrainian People's Republic	Russian SFSR; Ukrainian SSR South Russia	UPR victory
15 April 1920	Battle of Voznesensk (1920)	Ukrainian People's Republic	Russian SFSR	UPR victory
25 April – July 1920	Kiev offensive (1920)	Second Polish Republic; Ukrainian People's Republic	Russian SFSR; Ukrainian SSR	Soviet victory
12–25 August 1920	Battle of Warsaw (1920)	Second Polish Republic; Ukrainian People's Republic	Russian SFSR; Byelorussian SSR; Ukrainian SSR	Polish–UPR victory
October – November 1921	Second Winter Campaign	Ukrainian People's Republic	Russian SFSR; Ukrainian SSR	Soviet victory
