= 1918 Central Powers occupation of Ukraine =

Military occupation of Ukraine

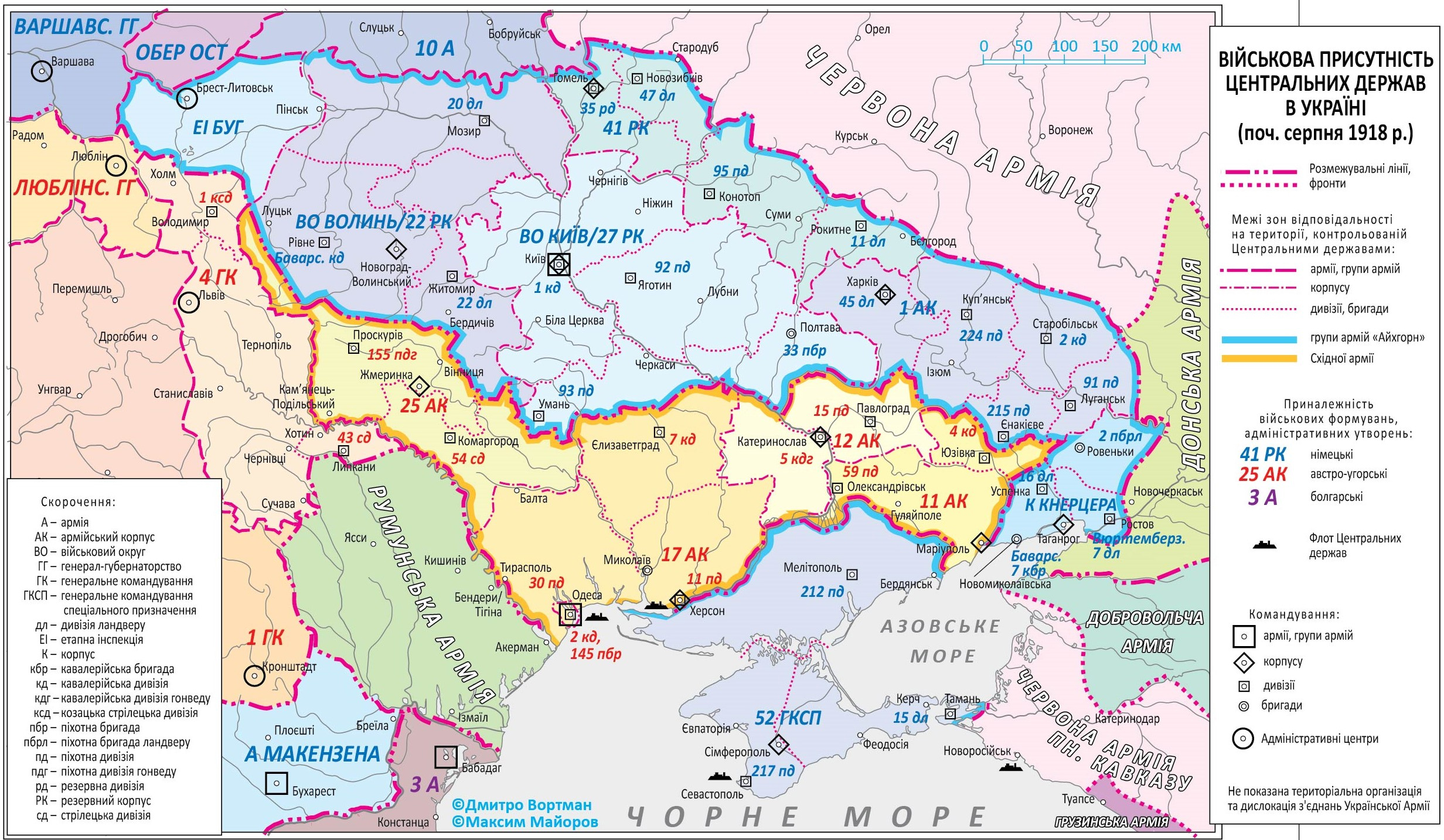
August 1918: Central Powers deployed in Ukraine: Occupied by the Imperial German Army Occupied by the Austro-Hungarian Army Other forces: Occupied by the Red Army (Soviet Russia) Occupied by the Don Army (Don Republic) Occupied by the Volunteer Army (Denikin) Controlled by the Romanian Land Forces

The 1918 Central Powers occupation of Ukraine, also known as the Austro-German occupation of Ukraine (Note: Ukrainian: Австро-німецька окупація України, romanized: Avstro-nimetska okupatsiya Ukrainy.) or German and Austro-Hungarian occupation of Ukraine, (Note: Ukrainian: Німецька і Австро-угорська окупація України, romanized: Nimetska i Avstro-uhorska okupatsiya Ukrainy.) in pro-Hetman sources also sometimes Control of Austro-German troops over the territory of Ukraine, (Note: Ukrainian: Контроль австро-німецьких військ над територією України, romanized: Kontrol' avstro-nimetskykh vijsk nad terytoriyeyu Ukrainy.) was the military occupation of the territory of Ukraine by the Imperial German Army and the Austro-Hungarian Army during February–December 1918. It was carried out by the two main Central Powers of World War I, the German Empire and Austria-Hungary, in accordance with their 9 February 1918 Treaty of Brest-Litovsk with the Ukrainian People's Republic (UPR), that on 22 January 1918 had proclaimed Ukraine's independence from Bolshevik-controlled Soviet Russia.

The Central Rada, the revolutionary council of Ukraine, sought to consolidate the UPR's independence and protect it against Soviet Russian attempts at (re)conquering Ukraine, while Germany and Austria-Hungary sought to prevent a food crisis by accessing Ukraine's rich grain resources, as well as using occupied Ukrainian territory as leverage in the ongoing peace negotiations with the Bolsheviks. Beginning on 18 February, the Central Powers conducted their successful Operation Faustschlag against the Bolshevik-controlled Russian Army, ending with the signing of the Treaty of Brest-Litovsk on 3 March 1918 between them and Soviet Russia, as the Bolsheviks decided to exit World War I in order to focus on fighting the Russian Civil War against the White Armies and separatist forces first.

The period was decisive in establishing the independence of the Ukrainian People's Republic (UPR), although its leading Central Rada had tenuous control over internal affairs. After two months, the Rada was overthrown by a German-backed military coup on 29 April 1918 that brought lieutenant general Pavlo Skoropadskyi to power and proclaimed the Ukrainian State. With the looming defeat of Germany and Austria-Hungary in World War I, as well as internal revolutions that brought down both the Hohenzollern and Habsburg monarchies, Austro-German troops gradually withdrew from Ukraine in November 1918. As a result of the simultaneous Anti-Hetman Uprising, power in Ukraine passed to the Directorate of Ukraine, which restored the Ukrainian People's Republic in early December 1918.

== Background ==
=== October Revolution and Ukrainian independence (7 November 1917 – 17 February 1918) ===
At the time, the Peace of Brest was a decisive factor in the course of the domestic and foreign policy of the Ukrainian People's Republic (UPR), whose independence had been proclaimed on 22 January 1918 by its parliament, the Central Rada. UPR forces had just lost the Battle of Kyiv (1918) to the Bolshevik troops, and were in desperate need of allies to turn the tide. Feeling unstable and uncertain about its position in the confrontation with pro-Soviet forces, the government of the Ukrainian People's Republic appealed to the German side on 12 February 1918 with a request to send German troops to Ukraine, with the help of which it hoped to preserve statehood and solve some problems of state-building.

In cooperation with the UPR military, the Rada allowed the German and Austro-Hungarian forces to occupy Ukraine, which began a few days later. The Soviet forces panicked as soon as they heard of the Central Powers' intervention, and all Bolshevik government and party organisations immediately began evacuating eastwards in a hurry. The Soviet leadership fled from Kyiv towards Poltava around 11/24 February, and one week later on 3 March [O.S. 18 February] 1918, the Central Powers and UPR troops entered Kyiv. The Soviets had only been in control of the capital for 20 days, and did not even offer token resistance to the Centrals as they chaotically retreated.

=== Operation Faustschlag (18 February – 3 March 1918) ===
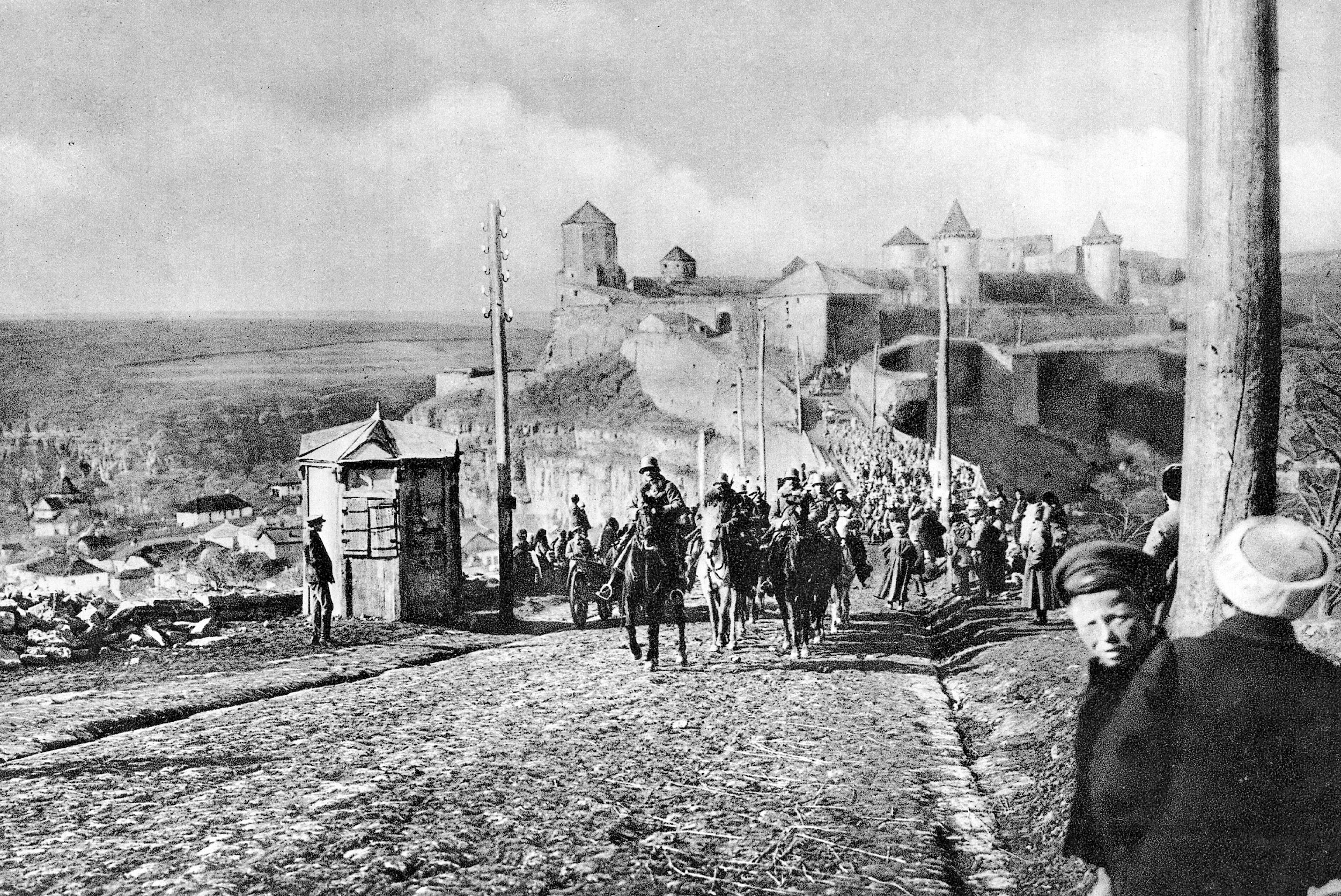
Austro-Hungarian troops enter Kamianets-Podilskyi in Western Ukraine, February 1918

The Central Powers aided the UPR troops in defeating and expelling Bolshevik forces that had occupied Kharkiv, Kiev (modern Kyiv) and other Ukrainian cities in December 1917 – February 1918. However, the UPR still had limited military and political control over its territory, with underdeveloped institutions and limited support from a population that was eager for the war to end as soon as possible. Moreover, the Centrals were more interested in requisitioning the ample food supplies of Ukraine (then already known as the Kornkammer or "Breadbasket of Europe") than helping to consolidate the fledgling Ukrainian democracy.

Having its own interests in Ukraine, namely the export of various goods, food and raw materials from its territory, the German government immediately responded to the request of the Ukrainian side. On 18 February 1918, German troops began to advance into Ukraine. On 27 February, they were supported by units of the Austro-Hungarian army. The total number of German and Austro-Hungarian troops was 450,000 soldiers and officers, with 23 German divisions advancing east, and 10 Austro-Hungarian divisions advancing southeast. A number of Ukrainian military units participated in the Austro-German operation, and fought along in what they viewed as the liberation of their country.

== Course of events ==
=== Advance of the Central Powers in Ukraine (3 March – 29 April 1918) ===
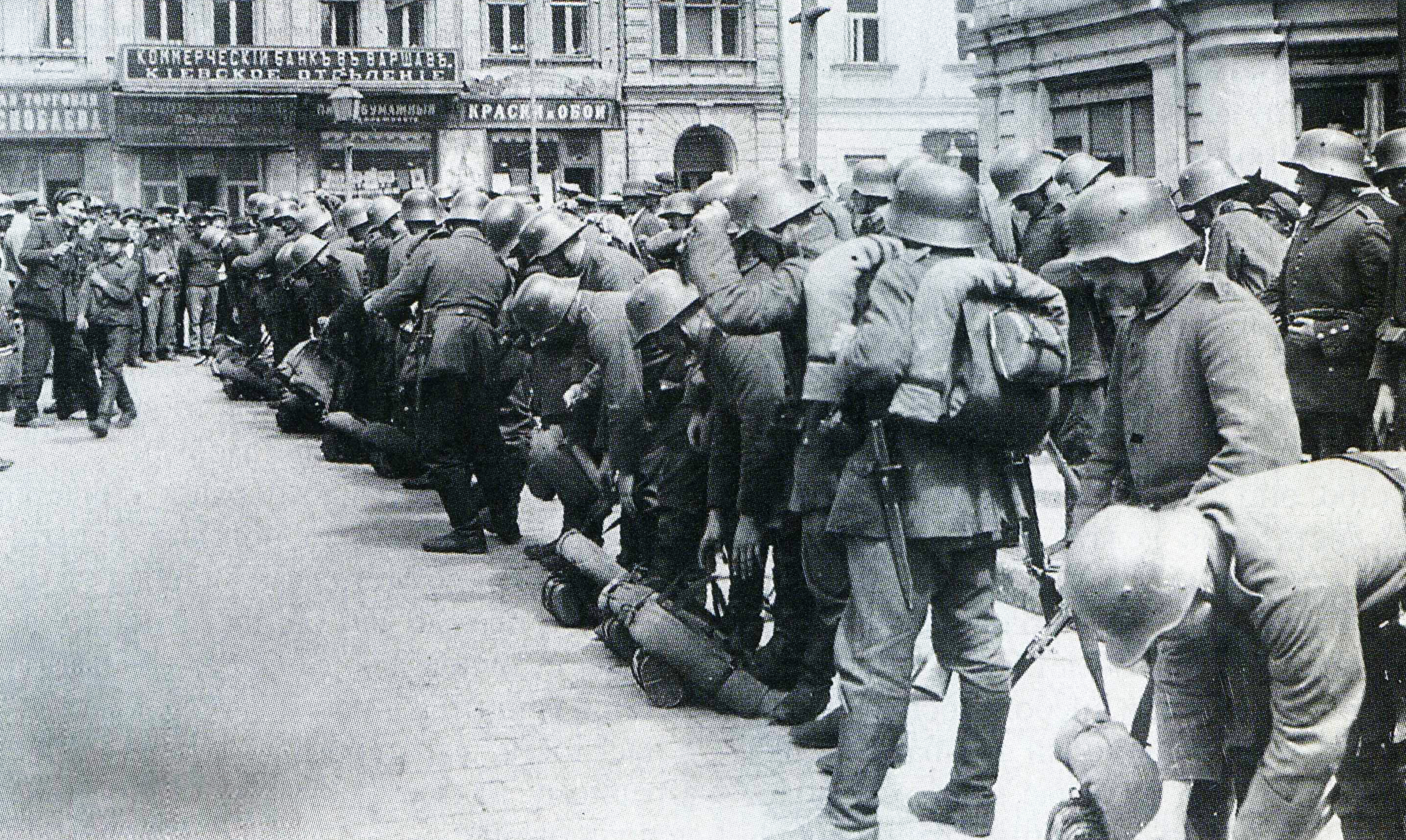
German troops entering Kiev (modern Kyiv) in March 1918

The address of the Central Rada of Ukraine on 11 March 1918 to the Ukrainian people and the statement of the representatives of the Austro-German Command in Ukraine interpreted the military presence of foreign powers as a friendly act of assistance, and stressed the non-interference of the Germans in the internal affairs of Ukraine. The German and Austro-Hungarian governments were careful not to use the term "occupation" in any official documents; instead, deputy chief of the German general staff Erich Ludendorff called it "a rescue expedition to a friendly country", while emperor Charles I of Austria described it as a "peaceful penetration into a friendly country."

Meanwhile, the Bolsheviks attempted to regroup in eastern Ukraine. The new situation caused disagreements between the various Soviet factions. The expelled left-leaning Kyivan Bolsheviks sought to ally themselves with the peasant masses and engage in partisan guerrilla warfare without Russian help, and urged on their communist comrades in Kharkiv to try and retake the capital from the Rada, Germans and Austro-Hungarians. However, the right-leaning Kharkiv and Katerynoslav (Dnipro) Bolsheviks expressed separatist tendencies, striving to break with Kyiv and rather "join the Russian federation" for various socio-economic and political reasons, arguing that the rest of Ukraine lacked an industrialised proletariat, and that complete subordination to the central communist party organs in Moscow was necessary. These internal divisions within the Ukrainian communist movement weakened their overall capabilities. The left-wing faction would prevail for the time being at the Second All-Ukrainian Congress of Soviets in Katerynoslav on 17–19 March 1918, where it was decided that all of Ukraine would be united in a single Ukrainian Soviet Republic, separate from Soviet Russia, with its own separate all-Ukrainian communist party (initially named "Communist Party (Bolsheviks) of Ukraine" at the 18–20 April 1918 Taganrog Conference). However, just a few weeks later in April, the Central and UPR troops expelled all Bolshevik forces from the remaining territory of Ukraine, forcing them to flee to Moscow after all.

By the end of April 1918, the entire territory of Ukraine was under the control of the German and Austro-Hungarian armies. In the east, the occupation zone was limited to the line Bataysk – the Don river – the Siverskyi Donets river – Dyogtevo (Дёгтево/Дьогтево) – Osypovka (Осиповка) – Novobila – Valuyki – Grushevka – Belgorod – Sudzha – Rylsk. According to the agreement of 29 March 1918 between the German and Austro-Hungarian sides, the sphere of influence of Austria-Hungary included part of the Volyn, Podillia, Kherson, and Katerynoslav provinces. The management and exploitation of the coal and metallurgical regions were mutual. The rest of the provinces and Crimea were occupied by German troops (see Crimea Operation (1918)). Rail and water transport throughout Ukraine was under the control of the German command.

=== Deteriorating relations between the Central Powers and Central Rada (April 1918) ===
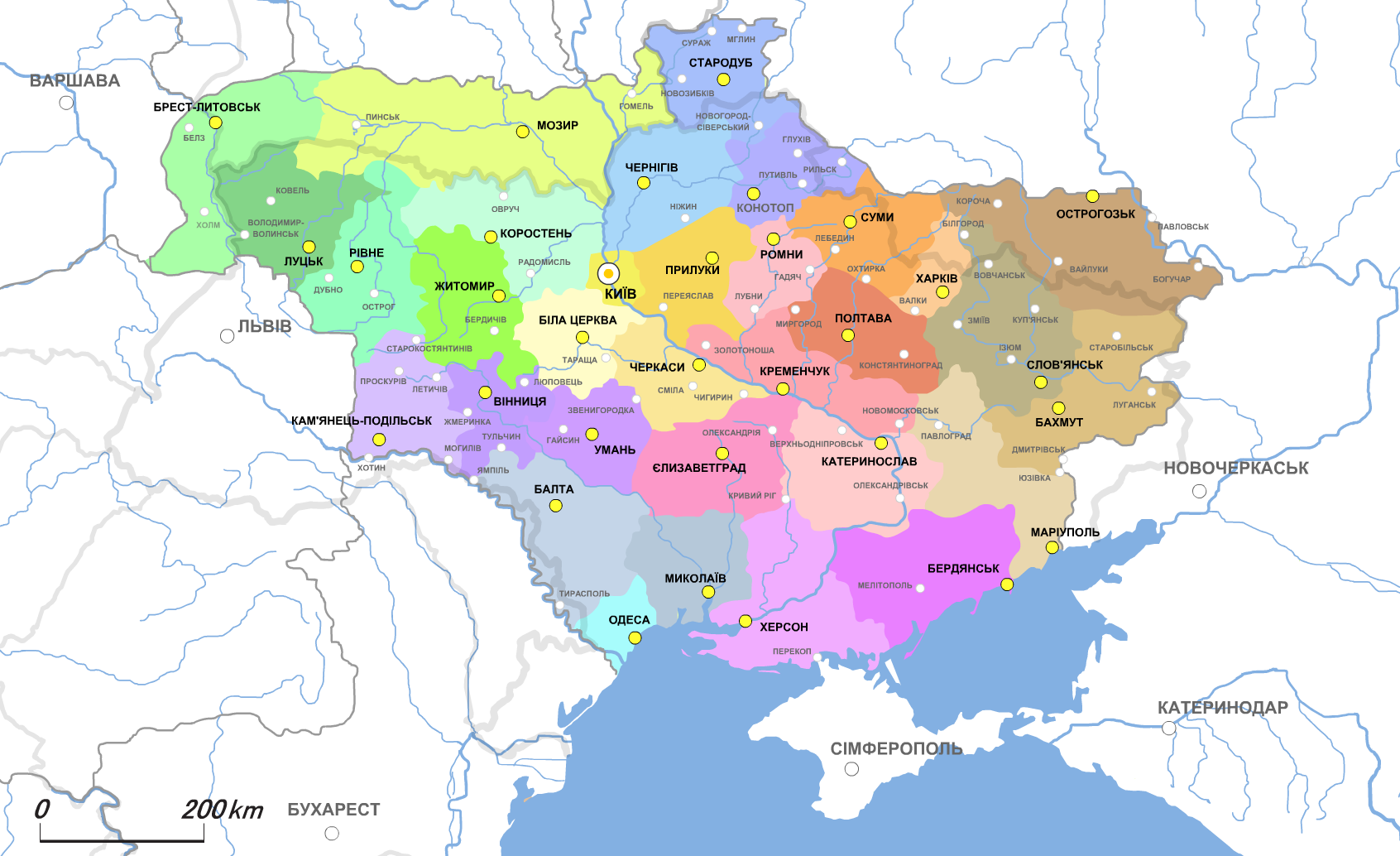
Ukraine's zemlias and their cities in 1918 (superimposed on modern borders)

On 23 April 1918, the UPR, the German Empire and Austria-Hungary signed a comprehensive economic, financial and commercial agreement. Ukraine undertook to supply the Central Powers with 60 million poods of grain, (Note: 1 pood was approximately 16.38 kilograms, or 36.11 pounds. Therefore, 60 million poods of grain was about 983 million kilograms, or 2167 pounds, or almost 1 tonne (metric ton).) 400 million eggs, and a significant amount of other foodstuffs and raw materials by 31 July 1918. For their part, Germany and Austria-Hungary were to supply Ukraine with agricultural machinery (planters, plows), fuels (coal, oil) and other commodities (textiles, perfumes, and so on). Given the presence of foreign troops on the territory of Ukraine, such relations could not be equal. German and Austro-Hungarian troops took part of the raw materials and material assets out of Ukraine as war booty.

The command of the German and Austro-Hungarian troops quickly realised the Central Rada's control over internal affairs was weak, and concluded that it was futile to cooperate with the Rada. The Rada was unable to manage the internal political situation in Ukraine, and to fulfil its promises to supply the Central Powers with bread and raw materials. This led the German and Austro-Hungarian command to actively and directly interfere in the internal affairs of the UPR. The order of the Commander-in-Chief of German troops, field marshal general Hermann von Eichhorn, dated 6 April 1918, on the matter of mandatory sowing of fields, issued without prior agreement with the Ukrainian government, was the first serious interference in the internal affairs of the UPR. The Central Rada reacted with loud but vain protest against this intrusion of Ukrainian sovereignty. Another great interference in Ukrainian internal affairs was the order of 25 April on the introduction of German military field courts in Ukraine.

In the meantime, the chief of staff of the Oberkommando in Ukraine, general Wilhelm Groener, had been planning a coup d'état to do away with the democratic and constitutional Central Rada entirely, and install a pro-German puppet that the German military command could easily control. He convinced the German military and political leadership that the situation was opportune, and taking direct control would enable the Central Powers to quickly seize all resources they needed or wanted and invest them in the war effort, while disregarding the Ukrainian population's interests and the Rada's protests. After searching for a few weeks, he settled on Pavlo Skoropadskyi, a popular general and leader of a conservative political organisation, as well as a former aristocrat and descendant from a Cossack Hetmanate family, to be the future monarch of Ukraine under German vassalage.

=== Hetman Coup (29 April 1918) ===
The Austro-German troops backed an anti-UPR military coup d'état on 29 April 1918, led by the 34th Army Corps' lieutenant general Pavlo Skoropadskyi, who then became the autocratic Hetman of the Ukrainian State.

On 29 April 1918, with the direct support of the German command, a coup d'état was carried out, which resulted in the overthrow of the Central Rada and the proclamation of the Ukrainian State. German and Austro-Hungarian troops were the decisive factor and support for the existence of the Pavlo Skoropadskyi Hetman regime.

=== Ukrainian State (30 April – 15 November 1918) ===
With the pro-German Hetmanate puppet regime now installed, the Central Powers dropped the pretenses and switched the manner of their control of Ukraine to one of a regular military occupation, aiming to fully exploit the country's economic potential. German general Max Hoffmann, one of the negotiators of the 9 February Peace Treaty of Brest with the UPR, cynically remarked: 'I am interested in Ukraine until the first harvest, and then, whatever happens to it will happen.'

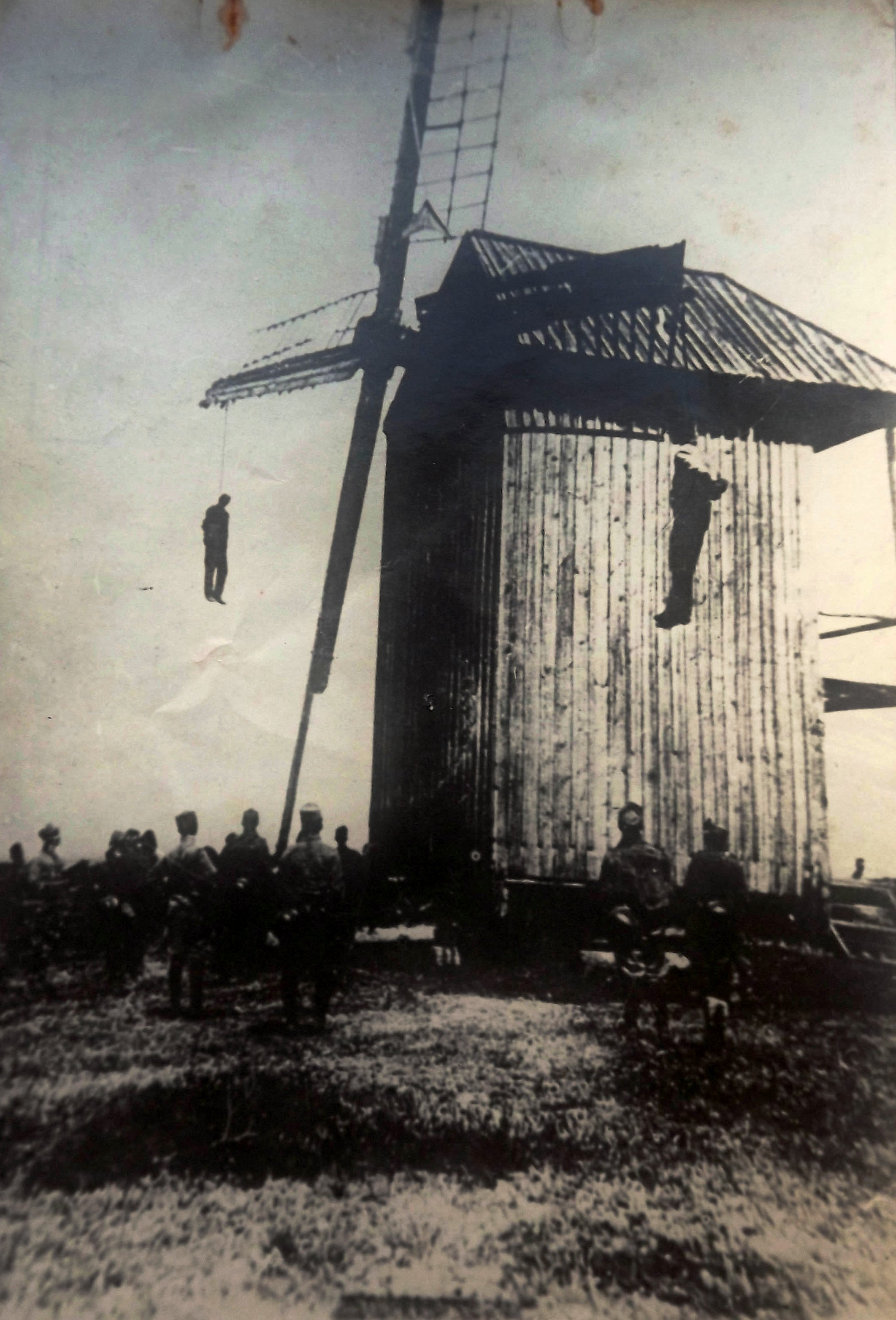
Hanging of peasant rebels near the village of Kanizh, Yelysavethrad povit in June 1918

While the UPR had attempted to confiscate the vast private properties of the major landowners and giving them to the Ukrainian peasants who worked on them, the Hetmanate and Austro-German occupiers reversed this socialist experiment and restored the private property of the wealthy landowners, exarcerbating peasant opposition to the occupation and Hetmanate authorities on top of their grain and other foodstuffs being seized without proper compensation. Ukrainian peasant demonstrations and eventually violent insurrections from May to July 1918 were the result; in particular, the 1918 Zvenyhorodka-Tarascha Uprising saw a 30,000-strong insurgent army fight against three German divisions and units of the Hetman's State Guard for about two months before it was suppressed. Field marshal Eichhorn attempted to downplay the peasant revolts by telling the German troops at the end of June: "According to all data, only 10–12% of the peasants are terrorising the countryside." Precise figures are hard to come by, but modern researchers estimate that tens of thousands of rebels and occupying and Hetman troops were killed during these conflicts.

In addition to negative effects, the Austro-German military control over the territory of Ukraine also had some positive consequences for Ukraine. The Austro-German troops were a pillar of the state system established in Ukraine, to a certain extent prevented the implementation of the Bolsheviks' great-power plans and socio-economic experiments in Ukraine, and in this sense played the role of a stabilising factor. Germany, in accordance with Article 4 of the Brest-Litovsk Peace Treaty of the RSFSR with the Quadruple Alliance on 3 March 1918, imposed on Soviet Russia compulsory obligations to recognise Ukraine's right to self-determination, the legitimacy of the Central Rada government, the terms of the 9 February 1918 UPR peace treaty with the Central Powers, the conclusion of a Ukrainian-Soviet peace treaty, the liberation of Ukrainian territory from Red Guard units, etc.

=== Shifting Soviet foreign policies (May–October 1918) ===
Meanwhile, the peace negotiations between the Ukrainian State and Soviet Russia were taking place between 23 May and 4 October 1918. The Russian SFSR had already signed an armistice with the Central Powers at Brest-Litovsk on 3 March 1918, and after withdrawing from its territory, the Soviets had to decide how to interact with Ukraine as a de jure independent state, but de facto Austro-German protectorate. A preliminary peace was agreed on 12 July 1918. Favouring the right-wing Bolshevik faction that sought to accept the loss of Ukraine, Trotsky was steering towards permanent peace with Germany and Austria-Hungary, refusing to arm partisans recruited by the left. On the other hand, Ukrainian left-wing communists and Russian Left Socialist-Revolutionaries wanted to continue the war, a position Stalin seems to have supported, and that was strengthened by the news of acts of violent resistance by Ukrainian peasants. Lenin seems to have trusted neither the left ("hot-heads") nor the right ("opportunists"), and settled on a compromise: there would be no official resumption of hosilities with the Central Powers, but Lenin also approved the creation of a Revolutionary Central Committee that would command underground resistance in Ukraine.

Nevertheless, the leftist Soviets overestimated their ability to motivate and organise Ukrainian peasants into rebellion against the occupying German and Austro-Hungarian forces, which eventually suppressed the unrest with relative ease in most parts of the country (except northern Chernigov). Moreover, the Kuban Offensive had led to disastrous Soviet operations in the Caucasus in August 1918, allowing elements of Denikin's White Army (later coalescing into the Armed Forces of South Russia) to make significant gains. By October 1918, the right-wing Ukrainian Bolsheviks swayed Soviet foreign policy to focus all available military forces on countering the Whites on the North Caucasian front, rather than supporting partisan activities against Austro-German troops in Ukraine.

Meanwhile, during 1918–1920, Britain and France prioritised defeating or containing the Soviet-communist revolution, and focused on supporting Denikin's White Army in order to restore the Russian Empire as part of the Triple Entente. They had little interest in supporting an independent Ukraine to hold Bolshevik Russia in check, also because Denikin as a Russian nationalist considered Ukraine part of Russia. Even after Denikin's defeat in April 1920, the Entente switched allegiance to the Second Polish Republic (and thereby its claims to Eastern Galicia and Volhynia in Western Ukraine).

=== Anti-Hetman Uprising (16 November – 15 December 1918) ===
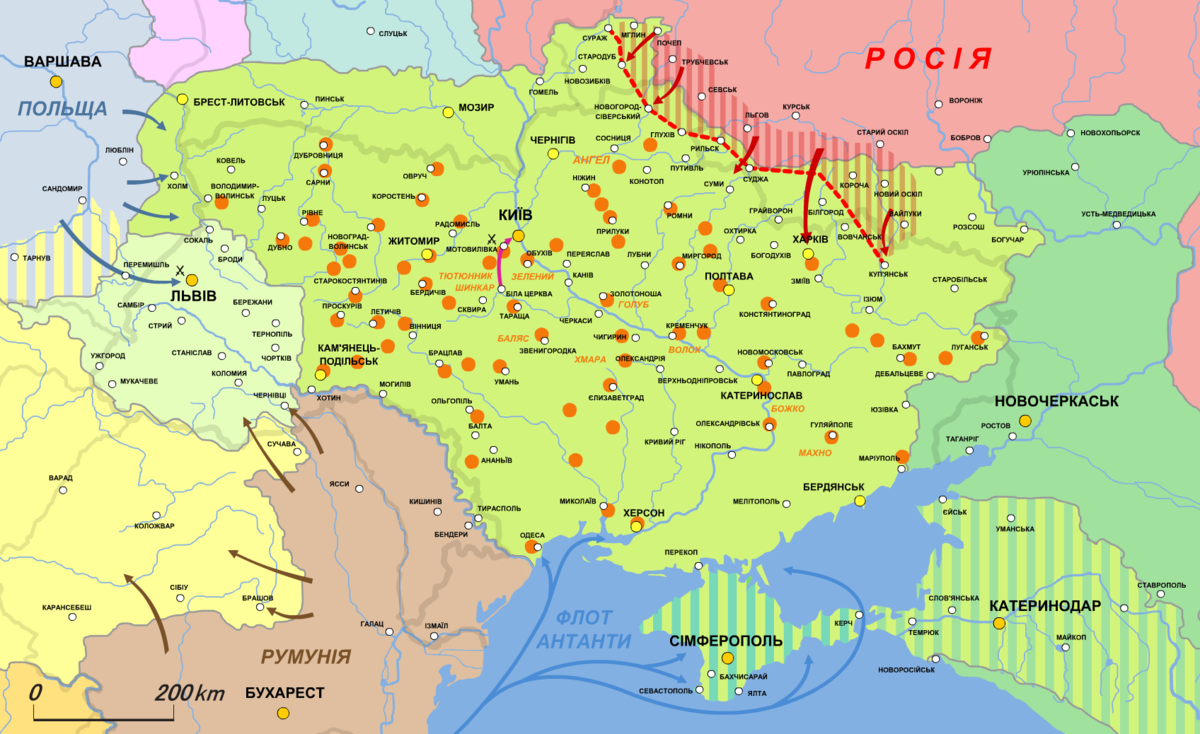
The Anti-Hetman Uprising ended the Central Powers' presence in Ukraine

While initially popular, Skoropadskyi proved unable to stabilise the economy and bring about the much-demanded land reforms for the largely landless Ukrainian peasantry, while the violent abuses committed by the occupying Central troops stoked ever more resentment towards the foreign garrisons.

Revolution and mutiny began spreading in Germany from 29 October 1918, leading to the proclamation of the Weimar Republic in Berlin, the abdication of Wilhelm II and the Armistice of 11 November 1918 on the Western Front, while the Republic of German-Austria was proclaimed on 12 November 1918 in Vienna. It seemed evident that Germany and Austria-Hungary were going to collapse internally, and their troops would have to return home and relinquish the territories in Eastern Europe occupied under the Treaty of Brest-Litovsk. Moreover, in Eastern Galicia, that had so far been part of Austria-Hungary, a pro-Ukrainian November 1918 Uprising in Lemberg (modern Lviv) saw the proclamation of the West Ukrainian People's Republic on 1 November 1918. However, the Polish majority of residents in the city soon launched a counter-attack, and called upon the army of the Second Polish Republic (which was still in formation), thus leading to the outbreak of the Polish–Ukrainian War.

Former members of the Central Rada formed the Directorate of Ukraine, and launched the Anti-Hetman Uprising on 16 November 1918, which managed to expel the German and Austro-Hungarian troops and topple Hetman Skoropadskyi's regime within 4 weeks, restoring the Ukrainian People's Republic.

== Aftermath ==
The Directorate's restoration of the Ukrainian People's Republic ushered in another brief period of de facto Ukrainian independence. An initial agreement to merge the Lviv-based West Ukrainian People's Republic (WUPR) into the Kyiv-based Ukrainian People's Republic (UPR) was initially concluded on 1 December 1918, and finally formalised on 22 January 1919 with the Unification Act (still celebrated as the Day of Ukrainian Unity). However, its main allies, the Central Powers, had now become its enemies, were defeated and had withdrawn, leaving Ukraine vulnerable to another Soviet Russian invasion without any other support. The Soviet westward offensive of 1918–1919 had been launched on 18 November 1918, once again threatening the UPR's existence.

The Directorate thus appealed to the Western Allies and the Crimean Regional Government, while concluding an uneasy truce with Denikin's "White" Volunteer Army in the northern Caucasus for now. The co-belligerents launched the so-called Southern Russia intervention (18 December 1918 – 30 April 1919) in an attempt to expel the Bolsheviks from Crimea, Odesa, Kherson, Mykolaiv and other occupied territories of the UPR. But the operation was a failure, and the Allied forces had to evacuate from Ukraine. Shortly thereafter, Soviet Russia launched the 1919 Soviet invasion of Ukraine. On the other hand, when a Polish army under Józef Haller arrived from France to Eastern Galicia in April 1919, the Western Ukrainian People's Republic forces were gradually driven back and defeated by July 1919. It would take another year for the Kyiv-based Ukrainian People's Republic and Poland to reconcile with the Treaty of Warsaw in April 1920: Kyiv conceded the loss of Galicia to Poland, Warsaw recognised the independence of Ukraine, and both allied against Soviet Russia.

== See also ==
- List of states and regions involved in the Russian Civil War
- Bibliography of the Russian Revolution and Civil War
- Outline of the Russian Revolution and Civil War
- Operation Faustschlag
- List of battles involving the Ukrainian People's Republic

== Literature ==
=== Books ===
- Doroshenko, Dmytro (1930). Історія України. 1917—1923 [History of Ukraine. 1917–1923.] (in Ukrainian). Uzhhorod.
- Verstyuk, Vladislav Fedorovych (1997). Українська Центральна Рада [Ukrainian Central Rada] (in Ukrainian). Kyiv.
- Barvinska, Polina Ivanivna (2001). Крах австро-німецької окупації — сучасний стан дослідження проблеми [The collapse of the Austro-German occupation – the current state of research] (in Ukrainian). Odesa: Proceedings of the Faculty of History of Odesa National University. Issue 11. pp. 57–64.
- Pipes, Richard Edgar (1997). The Formation of the Soviet Union: Communism and Nationalism, 1917–1923, Revised Edition. Harvard University Press. p. 392. ISBN 978-0-674-41764-9.
- Reyent, Oleksandr Petrovych (2002). "Терор австро-німецьких окупантів і гетьманців щодо селян та робітників" [Terror of the Austro-German occupiers and Hetmans against peasants and workers]. Політичний терор і тероризм в Україні. XIX—XX ст. Історичні нариси [Political Terror and Terrorism in Ukraine. 19th–20th centuries. Historical essays] (PDF) (in Ukrainian). Kyiv: Naukova Dumka. pp. 130–145. ISBN 966-00-0025-1.
- Snyder, Timothy (2003). The Reconstruction of Nations: Poland, Ukraine, Lithuania, Belarus, 1569–1999 (PDF). New Haven, CT: Yale University Press. p. 384. ISBN 978-0-300-12841-3.

=== Encyclopedic articles ===
- Lupandin, Oleksiy Ihorovych (2 January 2001). "Австро-Німецька окупація України 1918" [Austro-German occupation of Ukraine 1918]. Encyclopedia of Modern Ukraine (EMU/ЕСУ/ESU) (in Ukrainian). Kyiv: NASU Institute of Encyclopaedic Research. Archived from the original on 5 March 2017.
- Lupandin, Oleksiy Ihorovych (2003). "Австро-німецьких військ контроль 1918" [Austro-German military control 1918]. Encyclopedia of History of Ukraine (in Ukrainian). Kyiv: Naukova Dumka. Archived from the original on 2 April 2016.
- Pyrih, R. Ya. (2023). "Німецька і Австро-угорська окупація України 1918" [German and Austro-Hungarian occupation of Ukraine 1918]. Encyclopedia of History of Ukraine (in Ukrainian). Kyiv: Naukova Dumka.
