= German invasion of Russia =

German invasion of Russia may refer to:

- 1915 Gorlice–Tarnów offensive: the German Empire's attack on Russian forces, in World War I, that resulted in Russian collapse and invasion of the Russian Empire.
- 1918 Operation Faustschlag: the German Empire's attack that invaded the Russian heartlands, reaching as far as Pskov.
- 1941 Operation Barbarossa: the invasion of the Soviet Union, eventually including large parts of Russia, by Nazi Germany in World War II.
