= Andriy Dolud =

Ukrainian military figure

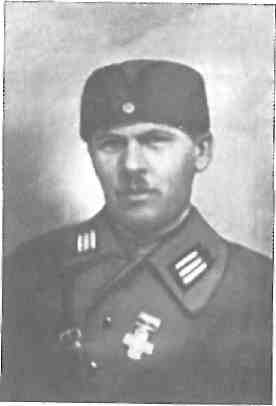
- Andriy Dolud during the First Winter Campaign
- Born: 15 October 1893; Pletenyi Tashlyk, Kherson Governorate, Russian Empire
- Died: 6 September 1976 (aged 82); Curitiba, Paraná, Brazil
- Military career
- Allegiance: Russian Empire; West Ukrainian People's Republic; Ukrainian People's Republic; Nazi Germany
- Branch: (Russian Empire) Imperial Russian Army; Ukrainian Galician Army; Ukrainian People's Army; Ukrainian Liberation Army; Ukrainian National Army; Wehrmacht
- Rank: Lieutenant Colonel
- Conflicts: World War I; Polish–Ukrainian War; Battle of Zhovkva; Vovchukhiv Operation; Ukrainian–Soviet War; First Winter Campaign; Polish–Soviet War; World War II

Andriy Dolud (15 October 1893 – 6 September 1976) was a Ukrainian military figure and was Cornet General of the Ukrainian People's Army and Chief of Staff of the Ukrainian People's Army in the First Winter Campaign. He would later serve in the Ukrainian Liberation Army.

== Biography ==
During the First World War he fought in the modern-day Ternopil Oblast as a member of the troops of the South-Western Front.

From 1917 to 1918 he was a member of the Central Council of Ukraine. On 13 November 1918, at the head of the Cossack detachment named after Ivan Honta, formed of Dnieper Ukrainians, he arrived in Lviv to help the Ukrainian Galician Army. He took part in the Polish-Ukrainian War and from the end of 1918 he commanded the Yaniv second brigade of the UGA, which distinguished itself in battles with Polish units on the outskirts of Lviv, during the Vovchukhiv Operation (Ukr) of 1919 and the Chortkiv offensive of 1919.

From December 1919 to May 1920 he was chief of staff of the UPR Army during the First Winter Campaign. During the Polish-Soviet War, he commanded the 5th Kherson Division of the UPA Army. In November 1920 he was interned with a division near Pidvolochysk. In 1921 he left for Brazil.

In 1942 he formally headed the Ukrainian Liberation Army, which was formed as part of the ground forces of the Wehrmacht. From 1943 he headed the Zaporizhzhya detachment of the Ukrainian Free Cossacks in Ost-Nachschub-Bataillon 651 as part of the Wehrmacht, which in 1945 became part of the 2nd Ukrainian Division of the Ukrainian National Army.

In 1944 he was a member of the Cossack staff of General Andrei Shkuro.

Together with Colonel Datskiv, they organized the camp for Ukrainians in Ulm. After 1945 he emigrated to Latin America.

He died on 6 September 1976 and is buried in Curitiba, Paraná, Brazil.

== Bibliography ==
- K. E. Naumenko . Dolud Andriy // Encyclopedia of Modern Ukraine: in 30 volumes / ed. count IM Dziuba [etc.]; NAS of Ukraine, NTSh. - K, Institute of Encyclopedic Research of the National Academy of Sciences of Ukraine, 2001–2020. - 10,000 copies. - ISBN 944-02-3354-X.
- Savchenko GP Dolud Andriy, Encyclopedia of the History of Ukraine, VA Smoliy and others, Institute of History of Ukraine, National Academy of Sciences of Ukraine. - K . : Scientific thought, 2004 . - Т. 2: Г - Д. - 518 с. : il. - ISBN 966-00-0405-2 Page 440.
- Yaroslav Yuriyovych Tynchenko, Officer Corps of the Army of the Ukrainian People's Republic (1917-1921). Book I Tempora, 2007. - ISBN 966-8201-26-4.
- Yaroslav Yuriyovych Tynchenko, Officer Corps of the Army of the Ukrainian People's Republic (1917-1921). Book II Tempora, 2007. - ISBN 978-617-569-041-3.
- Central State Archive of the highest authorities and administration of Ukraine - List of sergeants enlisted in the actual Ukrainian military service and promoted to the following ranks during July 1920 - July 1923
- Gutsal P. Dolud Andriy // Ternopil encyclopedic dictionary: in 4 volumes / editor: G. Yavorsky and others. - Ternopil: Publishing and Printing Plant "Zbruch", 2004. - Vol. 1: A - J. - P. 519. - ISBN 966-528-197-6.
- G.P. Sawczenko, Dolud Andriy, Encyclopedia of the History of Ukraine, vol. 2, 2005.
- Encyclopedia of Ukrainian Studies, Lviv 1998, volume 2, p. 559
