= Mykhailo Kovenko =

- Михайло Микитович Ковенко
- Born: November 8, 1888; Akhtyrka county, Kharkov Governorate
- Died: 1920's
- Occupations: military engineer, diplomat, administrator
- Years active: 1910–1920s
- Military career
- Allegiance: Russian Empire; Ukrainian People's Republic
- Branch: Army, engineer corps, militia
- Service years: 1910–1920s
- Unit: Free Cossacks
- Commands: commandant of Kiev and Vinnytsia
- Conflicts: Battle of Kiev
- Other work: diplomat work

Mykhailo Kovenko (Ukrainian: Михайло Микитович Ковенко) was a Ukrainian military and political figure.

== Biography ==
Born in a village of Hryazne (today Chernechyna) of Okhtyrka county on November 8, 1888, Kovenko finished his school near Kharkiv in Liubotyn in 1899. Later Kovenko emigrated to Germany where he finished a technical school in Altenburg (Duchy of Saxe-Altenburg) and Technische Universität Darmstadt in Darmstadt (Grand Duchy of Hesse) in 1910.

In 1910 Kovenko joined the 1st Caucasus Railway Battalion. In 1914 he worked as an engineer assistant for servicing mills at the Kharkiv department of merchant guild "Abram Volkenstein and sons". From October 1915 to July 1916 Kovenko headed a technical bureau of Mechanical Shops department for the Southwestern Front committee of All Russian Land Union (Zemskoi Soyuz). In 1916 he joined the Ukrainian Social Democratic Labor Party and from July 1917 member of the Central Council of Ukraine where he represents the All-Ukrainian Soviet of Workers Deputies.

By the end of 1917 Kovenko switched to the Ukrainian Party of Socialist-Independists which stood in opposition to government and arose from the Ukrainian People's Party of Mikhnovsky. On September 17, 1917, he was appointed as a director of Election bureau for the General Secretariat of Interior. On December 3, 1917, Kovenko was a Free Cossacks instructor for protection of elections. In January 1918 as the leader of Free Cossacks he was appointed the city commissar of Kiev of the Central Council of Ukraine. On January 16, 1918, due to advance of the Russian Red Guards Kovenko was installed to the position of Kiev city special commandant participating in the defense of Kiev against the Russian troops and extinguishing the Bolshevik uprising at Arsenal factory. He conducted numerous arrests against the Left Socialist-Revolutionaries who joined Bolshevik government.

On March 9, 1918, Kovenko was appointed as a representative of Ministry of Foreign Affairs of Ukraine for the German military administration. From May 1918 he served as a director of the Arsenal Factory. In 1919 Kovenko was a chief editor of newspaper Ukrayina in Kamyanets-Podilsky and a special commandant of Vinnytsia. In 1919 he also headed the Supreme Investigative Commission in struggle against counterrevolution. In 1920 Kovenko emigrated to Romania where in 1922 he worked in a department of the League of Nations Ukrainian Association.
