= First Winter Campaign =

Ukrainian campaign between 1919 and 1920

- Part of the Soviet–Ukrainian War
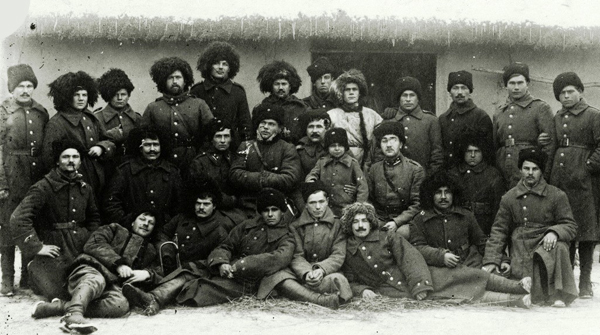
- Ukrainian fighters before the start of the military winter campaign, December 1919
Date	6 December 1919 — 6 May 1920
Location	Ukraine
Result	Ukrainian victory; Treaty of Warsaw (1920)

Belligerents
Ukrainian People’s Republic; Kholodny Yar Republic; Poland	Russian SFSR; Ukrainian SSR	South Russia

Commanders and leaders
Symon Petliura; Mykhailo Omelianovych-Pavlenko; Volodymyr Salsky; Yuriy Tyutyunnyk; Marko Bezruchko; Petro Dyachenko; Andriy Dolud; Vasyl Chuchupak †	Mikhail Tukhachevsky; Sergey Mezheninov; Aleksandr Yegorov; Kliment Voroshilov; Semyon Budyonny; Ieronim Uborevich; Iona Yakir	Anton Denikin; Nikolay Shilling; Yakov Slaschyev

Strength
4,769	50,000–65,000	7,000 (Note: On the whole front against the Makhnovists and the UPR)

Casualties and losses
681 killed	Voznesensk: 200–648 killed 400 wounded 100 captured	Unknown

The First Winter Campaign (Ukrainian: Перший Зимовий Похід; 6 December 1919 — 6 May 1920) was a campaign by the Ukrainian People's Republic against the Bolsheviks in Ukraine during the Soviet-Ukrainian War. The main task of the Winter Campaign was to maintain the presence of the Ukrainian People's Army (UPA) in Ukrainian territory against the enemies, through guerrilla action. At the end of November 1919, the remnants of the Ukrainian forces were surrounded (Lyubar-Chortoria-Myropil). The Ukrainian Galician Army, due to Petliura's agreement with the Second Polish Republic, was forced to join General Anton Denikin's Russian Volunteer Army after 6 November 1919. The Ukrainian People's Army troops were surrounded by three enemy armies — the Red Army, Russian Volunteer Army and Polish Army (with which reconciliation was achieved at that time); in addition, Ukrainian units suffered from the typhus epidemic. On 6 December 1919, at a military meeting in Nova Chortoria, it was finally decided to carry out a Winter Campaign by units of the UPR and the rear of the Volunteer Army. About 5,000 Ukrainians and 35,000–60,000 Poles took part in the campaign against the Red and Volunteer Armies. However, the composition of the Ukrainian combat-ready units numbered 2,000 bayonets, 1,000 sabers and 14 guns.

== Background ==
The First World War saw tremendous upheaval in Ukraine, and in the short period between the spring of 1917 and late of 1919, three governments had taken shape in the capital, Kyiv. However, the political situation was difficult because of the international pressure from Poland, and especially the Bolsheviks.

By late 1919, it became clear that conventional warfare against the Bolshevik forces in Ukraine had become impossible, so the Ukrainian People's Republic had decided to demobilize its military and conduct partisan warfare behind Bolshevik lines.

== Participating Units ==
There were three main Ukrainian units - they were renamed divisions in February 1920. Group "Zaporizhzhia" was commanded by the Ukrainian General Andriy Huliy-Hulenko; Group “Kyiv" was commanded by the Ukrainian General Yuriy Tyutyunnyk; and Group "Volhynia" was commanded by the Ukrainian General Oleksander Zahrodsky. The chief of staff during the campaign was Andriy Dolud.

== Main Battles ==
During the entire campaign, around 2,500 kilometers were covered by the enemy, more than 50 battles Ukrainians has successfully won.

Because of the nature of the campaign, the armies covered much territory. Originally the main theater of war was the Yelizavhrad Oblast, but as the Bolshevik-Denikin front moved south, so did the campaign.

The route of the First Winter Campaign passed through the territories of the present Zhytomyr (Romaniv, Lyubar, Chudniv districts), Kyiv (Tetiïv district), Cherkasy (almost all districts), Kirovohrad (almost all districts), Mykolaiv (Vradiyivka, Domanivka, Voznesensk, Novyi Buh, Kazanka districts), Odesa (Mykolaivka, Lyubashivka, Ananyiv, Balta districts), Vinnytsia (in 1919 - Khmilnyk, Kalynivka, Kozyatyn, Lypovets, Pohrebyshche, Orativ, the end of the campaign - Chechelnyk, Bershad, Trostianets, Tomashpil, Yampil, Tulchyn, Pishchanka districts).

The main battles of the First Winter Campaign took place at Lypovets, Zhashkiv, Uman, Kaniv, Cherkasy, Smila, Zolotonosha, Olviopol, Holovanivsk, Haisyn, Voznesensk, Ananiv, and Balta.

== Aftermath ==
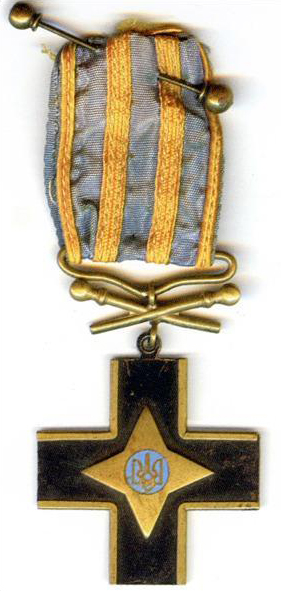
Iron Cross of the Ukrainian People's Republic

According to military historians, the First Winter Campaign of the Ukrainian People’s Republic forces is a significant page in the period of the Ukrainian Revolution (1917–1921). For the first time, the Ukrainian Army successfully used guerrilla methods to fight numerous enemies. All returning Winter Campaign participants were awarded the Order of the Iron Cross of the Ukrainian People's Republic. The Ukrainian troops were able to fulfill their goals and liberated many Ukrainian territories, including the capital of Ukraine — Kyiv together with Poland in the Kyiv offensive (1920) against the Bolsheviks.

== See also ==
- List of battles involving the Ukrainian People's Republic
- Second Winter Campaign
