= Bogusław Shashkevych =

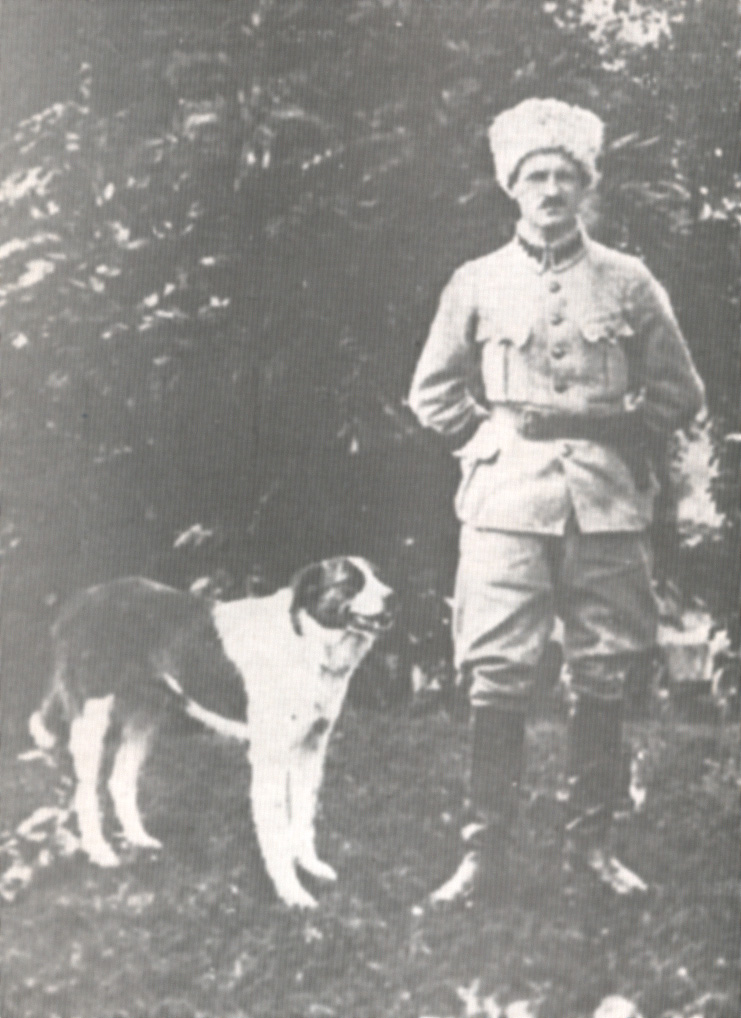
- Bogusław Shashkevych in Zbarazh, July 1919
- Born: July 1, 1888; Lolyn, Kingdom of Galicia and Lodomeria, Austria-Hungary
- Died: 1936 (aged 47–48); Edmonton, Alberta, Canada
- Burial place: Beechmon Cemetery, Edmonton, Alberta, Canada
- Military career
- Allegiance: Austria-Hungary; West Ukrainian People's Republic; Ukrainian People's Republic
- Branch: Austro-Hungarian Army; Ukrainian Galician Army; Ukrainian People's Army
- Conflicts: World War I Polish–Ukrainian War: Battle of Zhovkva

Bogusław Shashkevych was a Ukrainian major of the Ukrainian Galician Army, commander of the 9th UGA Infantry Brigade, and later the 21st and 4th UGA Infantry Brigades who served in World War I and the Polish–Ukrainian War.

== Biography ==
Shashkevych was born on July 1, 1888, in Lolyn, Kingdom of Galicia and Lodomeria. He was the grandson of the brother of the famous poet and leader of the Ruthenian Triad, Markiyan Shashkevych.

=== World War I ===
In 1908 he graduated from the infantry cadet school in Lviv and in the same year was assigned to the 58th Infantry Regiment in Stanislau. Feeling the pressure of the regiment commander Mechyslaw Zaleski for participating in the Ukrainian movement, he decided to retire from the army, taking a year off for health reasons, began to study at the Forest Academy in Vienna.

With the beginning of the First World War, Bogusław Shashkevych was forced to go to the Eastern Front. And for the battles against the Russians in the Przemyśl area in September 1914 he received a medal for bravery of the 1st class, at the same time received the military rank of four.

In February 1915 he was taken prisoner by the Russians during the Battle of Duklin Pass in the Carpathians. As a prisoner Bogusław Shashkevych was sent to Russian Turkestan with first being sent to Tashkent, then Ashgabat. Shashkevych wrote in his autobiography on July 3, 1922, from where he fled to Persia on November 6, where he took a direct part in the Persian national liberation uprising led by Count Kanitz and Goltz Pasha against the Russians and the British. Shashkevych was personally a subordinate to Major Klein, led a large division of the rebels. In June 1916, suffering from malaria, he returned to Austria via Baghdad and Constantinople, the same month he took part in the battles against Russian troops.

For Military Merit on the fronts of World War I was awarded the 7th Austrian, German, Turkish orders.

=== In the ranks of the Ukrainian Galician Army ===
In November 1918, after the November Revolution, in Lublin, the 58th Ukrainian Infantry Regiment, which included Shashkevych, rose in revolt against the Poles, but could not withstand the onslaught of the Polish Armed Forces and withdrew to Lviv. On December 12, Bogusław Shashkevych led the team of the 9th Belz-Uhniv Brigade. By order of Colonel Viktor Kurmanovych, on January 7, 1919, B. Shashkevych's group tried to stop the advance of Polish troops with a counterattack from the Pier but it did not succeed. During the storming of Belz in February–May 1919, he was in the village of Parkhachi with the brigade command. In May 1919 he headed the First Division of the Galician Army.

In June 1919 he organized the 21st Zbarazh Brigade. After the onset of the Polish invasion on all fronts June 28, 1919 near the villages of Pidlyssya, Shashkevych lead Lancers to counter-attack the Polish positions but the Poles later captured the area. In July he defended the retreat of the Galician Army through Zbruch. With the departure of the UGA for Zbruch, he conducted training for the people of Naddniprianshchyna, and later embraced the command of the 4th Zolochiv Brigade. On August 10, 1919, Red Army Comdiv, Nikolay Shchors dealt a heavy blow at the site where the Zolochiv Brigade in Sluch and captured Starokostyantyniv.

In January 1920, Shashkevych did not join the Red Ukrainian Galician Army ( CHUGA ), but joined the 4th Brigade in Mogilev in the Ukrainian People's Army of the Ukrainian People's Republic led by Colonel Oleksandr Udovychenko. Later, persecuted by the Poles, Shashkevych was forced to move to Czechoslovakia, where he spent 2 years in a camp of interned Ukrainian soldiers.

=== Exile and death ===
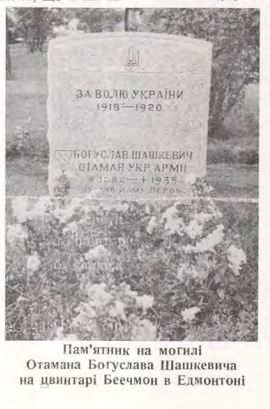
Shashkevych's grave in Edmonton

After internship in Czechoslovakia he found himself in Germany. He lived in Canada for the last years of his life, where he died suddenly in Edmonton in 1935. He was buried in Beechmon Cemetery.

== Awards ==
- Austria-Hungary: Order of the Iron Crown, III class with military decoration and swords
- Austria-Hungary: Military Merit Cross, III class with military decorations and swords
- Austria-Hungary: Medal for Bravery, first class
- German Empire: Iron Cross, II Class
- Ottoman Empire: Gallipoli Star, I and II Classes

== Bibliography ==
- Encyclopedia of Ukrainian Studies: Dictionary part: [in 11 vols.] / Shevchenko Scientific Society; Goal. ed. Prof., Dr. Vladimir Kubiyovych. - Paris — New York: Young Life, 1955-1995
- Lytvyn M., Naumenko K. History of the Western Ukrainian People's Republic. - Lviv : Institute of Ukrainian Studies of the National Academy of Sciences of Ukraine, Olir Publishing House, 1995. - 368 pp., Ill. 7867-9. ISBN 5-7707-7867-9
- Petro Sagaidachny Land Forces Academy.
- Otaman, grandson of the poet.
- Ukrainian army in the XX-XXI century.
- How Shashkevych commanded Kurdish detachments…
