= Grushevka, Belgorod Oblast =

Grushevka Грушевка
- Selo
- Location within Belgorod Oblast Location within Russia
- Coordinates: 50°24′N 37°41′E
- Country: Russia
- Region: Belgorod Oblast
- District: Volokonovsky District
- Time zone: UTC+3:00

Grushevka (Russian: Грушевка) is a rural locality (a selo) and the administrative center of Grushevskoye Rural Settlement, Volokonovsky District, Belgorod Oblast, Russia. The population was 574 as of 2010. There are 7 streets.

== Geography ==
Grushevka is located 21 km southwest of Volokonovka (the district's administrative centre) by road. Krasny Pakhar is the nearest rural locality.
