= 1918 Ukrainian coup d'état =

1918 coup d'état in the Ukrainian People's Republic

- Part of the Bolshevik–Ukrainian War during the Ukrainian War of the Independence in the Russian Civil War and World War I
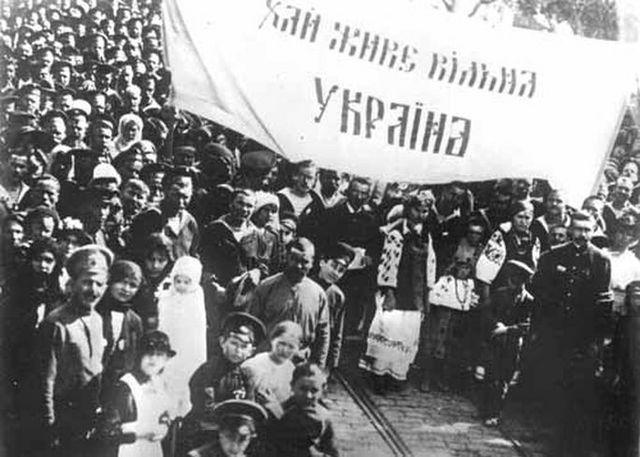
- Ukrainian supporters of the coup d'état carrying a banner saying "Long live free Ukraine"
Date	29–30 April 1918
Location	Saint Sophia Cathedral, Kyiv, Kyiv Governorate, Ukrainian People’s Republic
Result	Coup d'état successful: Dissolution of the Ukrainian Central Rada; Establishment of the Ukrainian State; Recognition of the Treaty of Brest–Litovsk; Restoration of the private ownership of the land

Belligerents
Hetmanite movement German Empire	Ukrainian People’s Republic

Commanders and leaders
Pavlo Skoropadskyi; Hermann von Eichhorn	Mykhailo Hrushevskyi; Vsevolod Holubovych; Oleksandr Zhukivskyi; Mykhailo Tkachenko

Units involved
Army Group Eichhorn-Kiev	Bluecoats; Ukrainian Sich Riflemen

Strength
Unknown	Unknown

Casualties and losses
None	3 killed

The 1918 Ukrainian coup d'état or Hetman Coup (Ukrainian: Гетьманський переворот, romanized: Hetmanskyi perevorot) was a military coup d'état within the Ukrainian People's Republic on 29 April 1918. That day, farmers and landowners loyal to the Ukrainian lieutenant general Pavlo Skoropadskyi, with the support of the German Empire, launched a coup d'état against the government of the Ukrainian People's Republic, removing the Central Rada and installing Skoropadskyi as hetman.

The coup was precipitated by a serious deterioration of relations between the Central Rada (parliament) of Ukraine and German occupation forces over land ownership conflicts, the paralysed status of the country's railway system, and the weak security apparatus of the Ukrainian government. These conditions ultimately culminated in the kidnapping of banker Abram Dobryi, who had helped to negotiate the Treaty of Brest-Litovsk between Ukraine and the Central Powers, by government officials. Ukraine's Prime Minister, Vsevolod Holubovych, as well as other government ministers, were arrested before the coup d'état, and the former was later convicted of organising the kidnapping.

The coup d'état was launched as a result of the All-Ukrainian Agrarian Congress, which met at the Kyiv circus shortly before noon on 29 April 1918. At the congress, protests calling for the overthrow of the government and the installation of Skoropadskyi as hetman began, leading to Skoropadskyi's arrival at the congress. As the protesters marched on Ukrainian government buildings and Saint Sophia Cathedral, they were met with minimal resistance, owing to the arrest of Minister of War Oleksandr Zhukivskyi for his involvement in Dobryi's kidnapping. Skoropadskyi was anointed by effective metropolitan of Kiev and Galicia Nicodemus (Krotkov) and declared the establishment of the Ukrainian State.

While viewed largely ambiguously by the Ukrainian population as a whole, the coup d'état led to an insurgency by supporters of the Central Rada, ultimately culminating in the Anti-Hetman Uprising in November and Skoropadskyi's abdication a month later.

== Background ==
By 1918, Ukraine was seen by German military leadership as being in a state of anarchy. The establishment of the Ukrainian People's Republic had led to widespread violence over land ownership, and Minister of War Oleksandr Zhukivskyi was unable to establish a strong military despite his efforts to increase discipline. An example of the chaos perceived by German officers was the Battle of Kiev, in which the city fell to a 4,000-strong Bolshevik force with minimal resistance despite the presence of over 30,000 officers of the former Imperial Russian Army in the city. In response to the city's fall, German forces occupied Kyiv in March 1918 and returned it to the Ukrainian People's Republic, while maintaining a military presence in the city.

Domestically, the Central Rada, the government of the Ukrainian People's Republic, was increasingly unpopular as a result of its faltering government. Most educated administrators had been removed from their positions, and the new government was largely made up of a group of young, inexperienced socialists who sought wide-reaching and fast social reforms. The Central Rada was quick to attack landowners and bourgeois, and these groups were excluded from the government despite making up a substantial portion of educated and experienced voices. Moreover, the Central Rada was unable to effectively wield social or economic control over a country dominated by warlordism and economic crisis.

Despite the recapture of Kyiv (and with it the effective re-establishment of the Ukrainian People's Republic), the Central Rada continued to struggle to manage the economy. Of particular concern to the Central Powers were the agriculture and railway industries, both of which were effectively uncontrolled by the Ukrainian government after the recapture of Kyiv. German forces in Ukraine, commanded by Hermann von Eichhorn, issued the "Order on Sowing Wheat" in early April. The measure established laws on land use, to be administered by German military courts. The Central Rada was outraged by the events and declared the order invalid.

== Prelude ==
Prior to the coup d'état, German forces had begun the process of deciding who would be instated as leader of Ukraine. The primary candidates were Ivan Poltavets-Ostrianytsia, Yevhen Chykalenko, Mykola Mikhnovsky, Ivan Lutsenko and Pavlo Skoropadskyi. The candidates were gradually ruled out – Poltavets-Ostrianytsia because he was deemed too adventurous, Mikhnovsky based on his unpredictability, and Lutsenko for his hardline and uncompromising attitude – until only Chykalenko and Skoropadskyi remained. Chykalenko refused to be involved in the coup, citing his advanced age. As a result, Skoropadskyi remained as the sole suitable candidate.

=== Kidnapping of Abram Dobryi ===
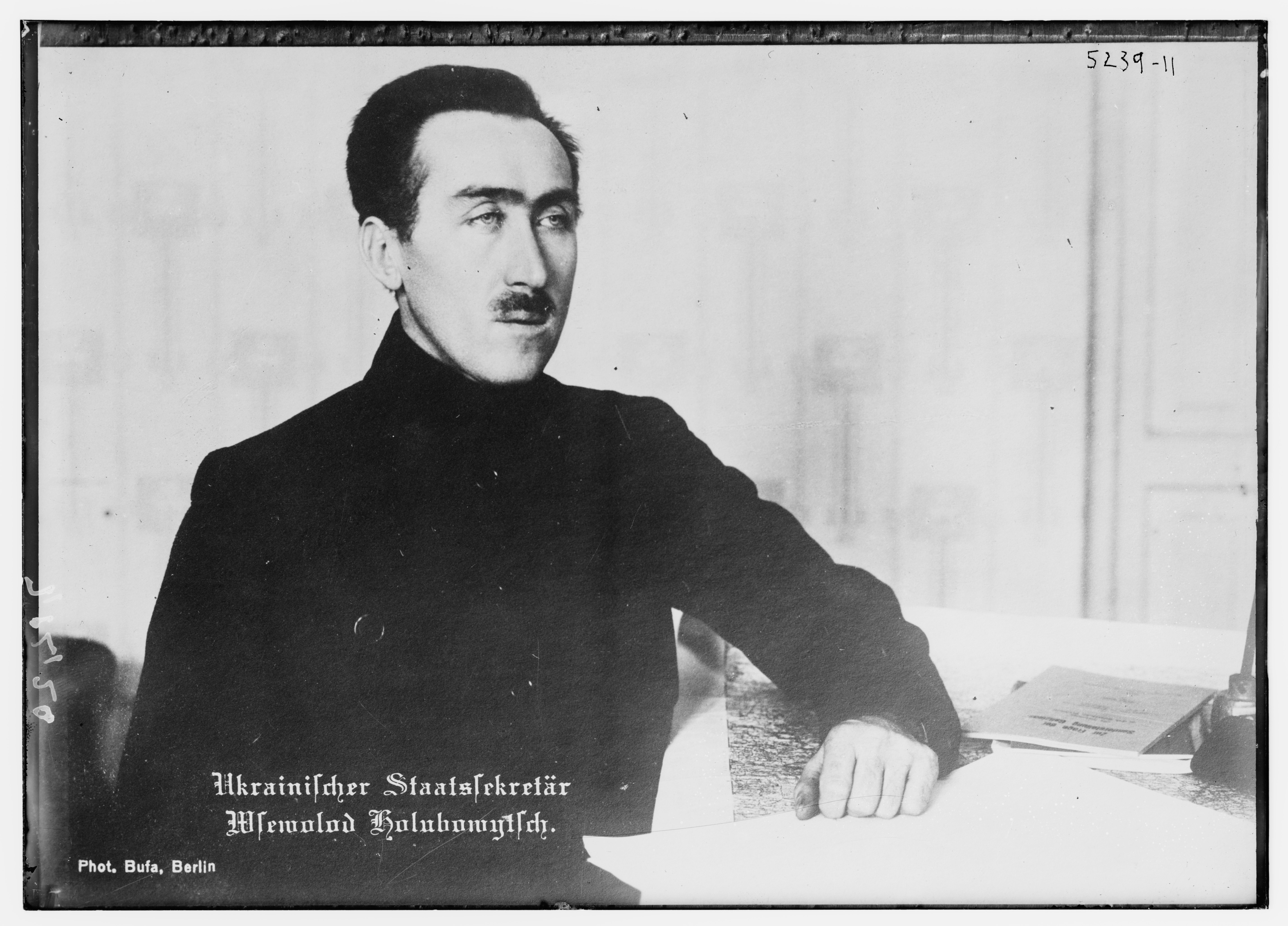
Vsevolod Holubovych, Prime Minister of Ukraine, was arrested by German authorities on 28 April 1918 and later convicted of organising banker Abram Dobryi's kidnapping

On 24 April 1918, Abram Dobryi, a prominent banker in Kyiv, was kidnapped from his apartment by three members of the Sich Riflemen and the Kyiv police force. Under the guise of an urgent telegram, his apartment was forcefully entered and he was declared to be under arrest. When asked for an arrest warrant by his wife, the kidnappers only gave an unofficial document with incomprehensible writing. After taking Dobryi, the kidnappers also left a briefcase in the apartment, and returned to retrieve it. Dobryi was forced into a car, brought to Kyiv railway station and sent to the eastern city of Kharkiv.

By the next day, rumors had begun swirling throughout the capital regarding the reasons for Dobryi's kidnapping. In response to the events, Army Group Eichhorn-Kiev demanded that the Ukrainian government find the kidnappers within 24 hours. Restrictions on gatherings, speech, and the press were also put in place by German authorities, and Army Group Eichhorn-Kiev stated it would be working to ensure the protection of individuals in Ukraine. The Central Rada was left incensed by the actions taken by German forces. In a 27 April debate in the Rada, Prime Minister Vsevolod Holubovych, said "This is simply an emphasis of the certain disorientation and inability, and perhaps, even, unwillingness to understand our affairs on the part of these probably quite irresponsible authorities of the German state, which are in the Ukraine."

After Dobryi reached Kharkiv, his captors intended to intern him at Kholodna Hora Prison. However, the prison's staff refused to imprison him without an arrest warrant, so he was instead kept under armed guard in the city's Grand Hotel. At this time, the leader of the kidnappers, surnamed Osypov, offered to release Dobryi for 100,000 rubles, with the condition that he would leave Ukraine. Dobryi handed over the ransom, but, rather than leave Ukraine, he instead bribed the guard to inform Kharkiv's German garrison of his whereabouts. At the same time, the Ukrainian government was coming under suspicion. In particular was Mykhailo Tkachenko (lawyer), the Minister of Internal Affairs, whose strange behaviour when questioned about the incident drew questions.

On 28 April 1918, German soldiers arrested Holubovych, Minister of Foreign Affairs Mykola Liubynsky, and Yurii Haievskyi, one of the secretaries of the Ministry of War, during a meeting of the Central Rada. Tkachenko's wife was also arrested, as was Zhukivskyi, who refused to flee Kyiv despite being offered. Tkachenko and Minister of Land Affairs Mykola Kovelevskyi both fled, with the latter only being arrested in June. All of those arrested were charged with the kidnapping of Dobryi. According to a Jewish Telegraphic Agency report from 1936, Dobryi's kidnapping resulted from his role in the negotiation of the Treaty of Brest-Litovsk. Ultimately, Holubovych would be convicted of organising the kidnapping.

== Coup d'état ==
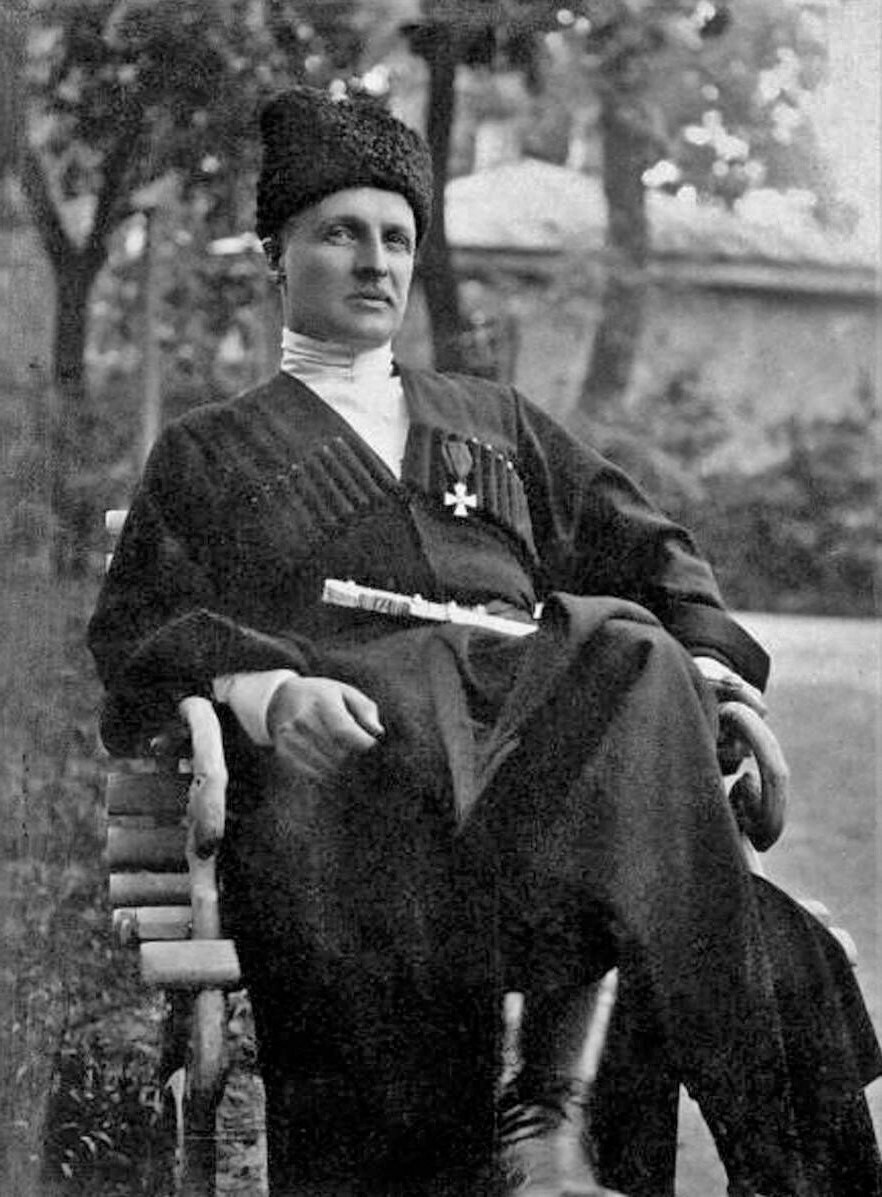
Pavlo Skoropadskyi, leader of the coup d'état

At 11:00 on 29 April 1918, the All-Ukrainian Agrarian Congress, consisting of farmers and landowners from throughout Ukraine, gathered in the Kyiv circus. As many as 6,000–8,000 were in attendance. In speeches at the congress, the policy of the Central Rada – in particular on agriculture and security – came under intense criticism. Speakers called on the Central Rada to unban the private ownership of land. At the end of the congress, protests began calling for the overthrow of the government. Supporters of Serhii Shemet, Vyacheslav Lypynsky, and Dmitry van Heiden began shouting, "We have Hetman Skoropadskyi, from a Hetman's family!", and were met by cheers.

At the time of the congress, Skoropadskyi was not present; he was at the Staff Headquarters of the Ukrainian People's Army, preparing to execute a coup d'état the following day. According to his memoirs, upon being informed of the protests for him at the Kyiv circus, Skoropadskyi changed from his military uniform to a civilian uniform and first rode a chariot to the Monument to Prince Volodymyr to mentally prepare himself. Then, Skoropadskyi entered the circus, where he was given the floor to cheers. Skoropadskyi said to the crowd "You have given me authority, and I shall serve you."

At the congress, an attempt was made by supporters of Lutsenko to organise a vote on the hetman of Ukraine. However, Skoropadskyi's supporters mobbed them. Ukrainian historian Pavlo Hai-Nyzhnyk has said that Lutsenko would likely have won had a vote has been organised.

After the congress, Skoropadskyi, alongside the farmers and landowners, traveled to Saint Sophia Cathedral for celebrations. At this time, they were approached by a detachment of Sich Riflemen armed with machine guns. However, as both Zhukivskyi and his deputy were absent (the former having been arrested the previous day), no actions were taken. From Saint Sophia Cathedral, Skoropadskyi's supporters began to seize government buildings, including the Ukrainian State Bank and the buildings of both the Ministry of War and the Ministry of Internal Affairs. The putsch was almost entirely bloodless, with only three soldiers who had sided with the coup being killed.

The same day as the coup, Skoropadskyi was anointed as Hetman of Ukraine by Nicodemus, acting metropolitan of Kiev and Galicia. After his anointing, Skoropadskyi issued the Letter to the Ukrainian People, formally announcing the establishment of the Ukrainian State. Private ownership of land was re-established and Ukrainian compliance with the Treaty of Brest-Litovsk was affirmed.

== Aftermath ==
Seal of the Ukrainian State, established after the coup d'état

The initial response to the coup d'état was largely apathetic among the Ukrainian military and population, both groups being primarily concerned with the security situation. Skoropadskyi's moves to restore private land ownership were seen as a positive step by German authorities, and he received support from both the German military and the Ukrainian Democratic Breadmakers' Party in his policy of state-building.

Immediately following the coup, the Ukrainian Socialist-Revolutionary Party declared its goal to be the armed overthrow of the new government. Most other parties, however, chose to instead pursue non-violent resistance. Former Prime Minister Volodymyr Vynnychenko and major general Mykola Shapoval also began formulating a plan for an uprising in September 1918. Skoropadskyi's government was undermined by his inability to quickly resolve the land issue and his unwillingness to reinstate democracy, and by the spring of 1918, an insurgency had already begun against his government. With the defeat of the Central Powers, Skoropadskyi's government, lacking a sizeable army due to the unwillingness of Germany and Austria-Hungary, found itself under threat, and, to appease the Allied Powers, on 14 November 1918 Skoropadskyi appointed Serhii Herbel as Chief Minister and wrote the Federal Charter, establishing Ukraine as a federal subject of White Russian forces.

Skoropadskyi's moves were deeply unpopular in Ukraine and sparked a wide-reaching uprising against his rule. Led by Vynnychenko and former Minister of Military Affairs Symon Petliura, the uprising quickly took over almost all of Ukraine, and Skoropadskyi would eventually abdicate on 14 December 1918, leading to the re-establishment of the Ukrainian People's Republic under the Directorate of Ukraine.
