= Battle of Voznesensk (1920) =

- Part of the Ukrainian–Soviet War (First Winter Campaign)
Date	15 April 1920
Location	Voznesensk
Result	Ukrainian victory

Belligerents
UPR Cossacks	Russian SFSR

Commanders and leaders
Mykhailo Pavlenko; Oleksa Almazov	Unknown

Strength
Unknown	600–700+ infantry 1 cavalry unit 1 cannon unit

Casualties and losses
1–2 killed 3–5 wounded	200–648 killed 400 wounded 100 captured

The Battle of Voznesensk took place between the Cossacks of Ukrainian People's Republic and Red forces as part of the Cossack raid on 15 April 1920.

== Prelude ==
By early April, 1920, situation was getting worse for Ukrainian forces during their winter campaign as they were running out of ammunition. Bolsheviks on the other hand didn't have a shortage of ammunition. Mykhailo Pavlenko decided to raid Voznesensk in order to capture the necessary supplies. Some sources put the date of the battle at 16 April.

== Battle ==
Around three o'clock, Ukrainian forces begun the offensive and Soviet forces opened fire. Ukrainian infantry reportedly clapped their hands while advancing due to lack of ammunition. Ukrainian forces were disadvantaged and eventually retreated. Red forces left their positions and pursued retreating Ukrainians. However, a fog that appeared gave an advantage to Ukrainian Cossack units and could only orient via sound. Bolsheviks continued attacking, but with advantage on Ukrainian side they were able to efficiently counterattack. Reds were later trapped and Zaporozhians wiped them out in the city during a sabre battle. Only some of the red cavalry managed to retreat.

== Aftermath ==
The Ukrainian victory at Voznesensk allowed Ukrainian forces to get the necessary supplies needed to continue their winter campaign. This battle was considered to be crucial for the outcome of winter campaign and existence of Ukrainian army.
