= Battle of Kiev (1918) =

Battle between the Ukrainian People's Republic and Bolshevik forces in Ukraine

Coordinates: 50°27′00″N 30°31′24″E

- Part of Ukrainian–Soviet War (1917–1921)
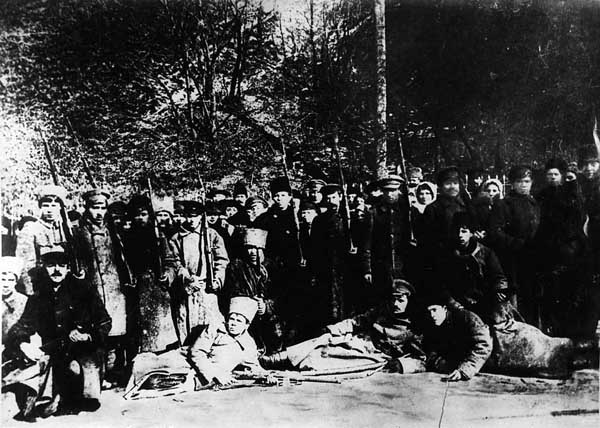
- A squad of Red Guards who fought in Kiev
Date	5 February [O.S. 23 January] – 8 February [O.S. 26 January] 1918
Location	Kiev, Ukrainian People's Republic
Result	Bolshevik victory
Territorial changes	Capture of Kiev by Bolsheviks

Belligerents
Ukrainian People's Republic	Russian SFSR

Commanders and leaders
Mykhailo Kovenko	Mikhail Muravyov

Units involved
Kiev city garrison	Red Guards

Strength
2,000; 3 batteries	7,000 armored train artillery battery

Casualties and losses
- at least 1,286 civilians killed

The Battle of Kiev of February (O.S. January) 1918 was a Bolshevik military operation of Petrograd and Moscow Red Guard formations directed to capture the capital of Ukraine. The operation was led by Red Guards commander Mikhail Artemyevich Muravyov as part of the Soviet expeditionary force against Kaledin and the Central Council of Ukraine. The storming of Kiev took place during the ongoing peace negotiations at Brest-Litovsk on 5–8 February 1918 (23–26 January in the Julian calendar). The operation resulted in the occupation of the city by Bolshevik troops on 9 February and the evacuation of the Ukrainian government to Zhytomyr.

== Background ==
The objective of the 1918 Battle of Kiev was to install Soviet power in Ukraine. During the winter of 1917–18, the revolutionary formations of Russia installed Soviet power in governorates of Kharkiv, Yekaterinoslav (modern day Dnipro), and Poltava. Kiev was next. The general command directed onto Kiev was under the command of Mikhail Muravyov. On 27 January [O.S. 14 January] 1918, the government of Ukraine announced that Kiev was under a siege and appointed Mykhailo Kovenko as the military commandant of the city's defence. With the approach of the advancing Soviet forces, the city's Bolsheviks instigated an uprising at the Arsenal factory, which was extinguished in seven days on 4 February [O.S. 22 January] 1918.

== Battle ==
The Bolshevik uprising in the city greatly eased the advancement of the Soviet forces, drawing several Ukrainian formations out of adjacent provinces. The Kiev garrison was greatly demoralized by Bolshevik propaganda and Soviet advances across the territory of Ukraine. Ukrainian regiments were depleted, and some either announced their neutrality or were eager to side with the Bolsheviks.

Bolshevik forces attacked the city from Bakhmach and Lubny. On 4 February Bolshevik troops commanded by Muravyov and Antonov started an artillery shelling of the city. According to press reports of the time, the shelling was performed from the area of Darnytsia, with bombs exploding over Kyiv Arsenal and damaging a number of buildings in the area of Instytutska Street. By the evening an artillery duel started, with Ukrainian forces shelling the Bolsheviks from the areas of Batyieva Hora and Pechersk. Starting from midday on 6 February (Old Style 24 January), Bolshevik artillery shelled Pechersk, Lypky and Old Kyiv for three days, bringing severe devastation to the areas. At the same time, Bolshevik armoured trains started advancing on the city, forcing the Ukrainian side to abandon its defenses. The Bolshevik shelling resulted in the destruction of a number of major buildings, including the house of Mykhailo Hrushevsky and the belfry of St. Nicholas Military Cathedral.

This [Soviet] power is brought by us from the far North on the tips of our bayonets, and there where we install if, we support it to full measure with the power of these bayonets and with the moral authority of the revolutionary Socialist army.

— From Mikhail Muravyov's order issued after the taking of Kyiv

On 8 February, the Ukrainian government and Central Rada were forced to abandon Kyiv. On 9 February General Muravyov took control of the city and instituted a reign of Red terror with brutal reprisals against Kiev's population that would last twenty days. According to estimates, between 3,000 and 6,000 people fell victim to street fights, shelling and following mass executions of officers and supporters of Central Rada by the Bolsheviks, although the documented list of victims issued by authorities in the following months included 1,286 names of people killed during the conflict. Among notable victims was colonel Jourdan, head of the French military mission in Kyiv, and metropolitan Vladimir Bogoyavlensky.

== Aftermath ==
On 8 February [O.S. 26 January] 1918, the same the day Bolshevik forces captured Kiev, the Central Rada signed the Peace of Brest with the Central Powers. In cooperation with the UPR military, the Rada allowed the German and Austro-Hungarian forces to occupy Ukraine, which began a few days later. The Soviet forces panicked as soon as they heard of the Central Powers' intervention, and all Bolshevik government and party organisations immediately began evacuating eastwards in a hurry. The Soviet leadership fled from Kiev towards Poltava around 11/24 February, and one week later on 3 March [O.S. 18 February] 1918, the Central Powers and UPR troops entered Kiev. The Soviets had only been in control of the capital for 20 days, and did not even offer token resistance to the Central Powers as they chaotically retreated.

Ukrainian People's Army forces under Symon Petliura, along with German and Austro-Hungarian troops, would retake Kiev on 1 March. The Bolshevik government recognized Ukraine's independence on 3 March.

Meanwhile, the Bolsheviks attempted to regroup in eastern Ukraine. The new situation caused disagreements between the various Soviet factions. The expelled left-leaning Kievan Bolsheviks sought to ally themselves with the peasant masses and engage in partisan guerrilla warfare without Russian help, and urged on their communist comrades in Kharkiv to try and retake the capital from the Rada, Germans and Austro-Hungarians. However, the right-leaning Kharkiv and Katerynoslav (Dnipro) Bolsheviks expressed separatist tendencies, striving to break with Kiev and rather "join the Russian federation" for various socio-economic and political reasons, arguing that the rest of Ukraine lacked an industrialised proletariat, and that complete subordination to the central communist party organs in Moscow was necessary. These internal divisions within the Ukrainian communist movement weakened their overall capabilities. The left-wing faction would prevail for the time being at the Second All-Ukrainian Congress of Soviets in Katerynoslav on 17–19 March 1918, where it was decided that all of Ukraine would be united in a single Ukrainian Soviet Republic, separate from Soviet Russia, with its own separate communist party. However, just a few weeks later in April, the Central Powers and UPR troops expelled all Bolshevik forces from the remaining territory of Ukraine, forcing them to flee to Moscow after all.

Subsequently, during May to October 1918, peace negotiations were held between Soviet Russia and Ukraine.

== Order of battle ==
=== Muravyov forces ===
- Commander in Chief Mikhail Artemyevich Muravyov
  - 1st Army Colonel Pavel Yegorov
  - 2nd Army Colonel Reingold Berzin

==== List of formations ====
- Red Guards of Bryansk 800 soldiers / Russians
- Red Guards of Moscow (Moscow river neighborhood) 200 soldiers / Latvians/ Russians
- Red Guards of Kharkiv 500 soldiers / Jews/ Russians
- Donbas Red Guards of Dmitry Zhloba 300 soldiers / Russians/ Ukrainians/ Jews
- Red Guards of Putilov Factory 60 soldiers / Jews/Russians/ Ukrainians
- 1st Petrograd Red Guard formation 1,000 soldiers / Latvians/ Russians
- Red Guards of Petrograd (Moscow district) 500 soldiers / Latvians/ Russians
- Kharkiv Red Guards of Aleksandr Belenkovich 150 soldiers / Jews/ Russians/ Ukrainians
- Red Cossacks of Vitaly Markovich Primakov 198 soldiers / Russians/ Ukrainians
- Bryansk battery 92 soldiers / Russians
- Armoured train of Moscow 100 soldiers / Russians
- Red Guards formations of local settlements / Jews/ Russians
- Underground workers of Arsenal (Cave monastery) / Russians/ Ukrainians

=== Ukrainian forces ===
- City commandant Mykhailo Kovenko
  - Haidamaka Host of Sloboda Ukraine Symon Petliura—400 soldiers
    - 2nd Cadet School Battalion—110 "Black Haidamakas"
    - Free Cossacks formations
    - Artillery division—3 batteries
  - Sich Riflemen of Halych Battalion Yevhen Konovalets—500 soldiers
  - Doroshenko Regiment—200 soldiers
  - Remnants of Bohdan Regiment Oleksandr Shapoval

== Bibliography ==
- Pipes, Richard Edgar (1997). The Formation of the Soviet Union: Communism and Nationalism, 1917–1923, Revised Edition. Harvard University Press. p. 392. ISBN 978-0-674-41764-9.
