= 1918 Russia–Ukraine negotiations =

Peace talks after Russia's exit from WWI

During the period May 23 – October 4, 1918, peace negotiations between the Ukrainian State and the Russian Soviet Federative Socialist Republic took place at a peace conference in Kiev.

For the Ukrainian side, the negotiations with the RSFSR were dictated by the need to solve the problems that arose as a result of the collapse of the Russian state and Ukraine's self-determination. Negotiations were forced upon the Russian side as obligatory in accordance with the Treaty of Brest-Litovsk of March 3, 1918 between the RSFSR and the states of the Quadruple Alliance (1915–1918). Under the terms of the Brest-Litovsk Treaty, Russia renounced territorial claims across a swathe of land on or near its borders, including Ukraine.

The negotiations resulted in the conclusion of a preliminary peace treaty on July 12, 1918.

== The progress of negotiations ==
Negotiations were conducted in the form of plenary meetings, where all important issues were resolved, agreements were concluded. In addition, during the conference, depending on the issues under consideration, relevant commissions on political, economic, financial, and cultural issues worked to prepare relevant materials for the plenary sessions. The Russian delegation was headed by C. Rakovsky and D. Manuelsky, the Ukrainian one by the Chief Justice of the Ukrainian State Serhiy Shelukhin. From the Ukrainian side, the following also participated in the negotiations: I. Kistyakivskyi, O. Slyvinskyi, O. Eichelman, H. Baranovskyi, A. Svitsyn, P. Linnychenko, O. Shulgin, V. Bronskyi, G. Lerhe, S. Gutnyk, Ye. Sakovich, P. Kholodny, M. Mohylyansky, and others.

On June 12, 1918, a preliminary peace treaty was concluded. According to its terms, combat operations at the front were to stop during negotiations, and the conditions for the repatriation of citizens of both states, the restoration of railway connections and the return to Ukraine of railway rolling stock that had been driven to Russia in the spring of 1918 were determined. According to the agreement, on June 22, 1918, the Ukrainian government adopted a resolution on the establishment of consulates-general of the Ukrainian State in Moscow and Petrograd (now St. Petersburg) and 30 consular agencies in other cities of Russia. Russian missions were opened in Ukraine: consulates-general in Kiev, Kharkov, Odessa and consular agencies in Kamianets-Podilskyi, Chernigov, Zhytomyr, and Poltava.

=== Russian-Ukrainian border ===
The main goal of the conference was to work out the terms of the peace treaty. The problem of establishing state borders was especially carefully discussed. In fact, all the subsequent plenary sessions in one way or another boiled down to heated discussions on this issue. Deliberately slowing down the progress of the negotiations, the Russian delegation expressed disagreement with the Ukrainian border project, considering it offensive and expansive towards Russia. For its part, the Ukrainian side was not satisfied with the Russian project, the purpose of which was to satisfy the great power claims of the RSFSR and its Bolshevik government, and to destroy the territorial and economic integrity of the Ukrainian State. Disputes between the parties on this matter brought the negotiations to an impasse.

=== Other questions ===
A number of issues were considered at the negotiations, including economic, trade, financial and settlement, division of debts and property of the former Russian Empire. On July 7, an agreement was reached on the exchange of goods. On July 25, another agreement was achieved about the division of property and debts of the former Russian empire. The Ukrainian State declared its rights to part of the property and gold fund of the former Russian Empire and demanded the complete return of cultural goods exported from Ukraine to Russia, which represented its cultural and historical heritage — the Ministry of Confessions of the Ukrainian State compiled lists of property of cultural significance that had to be returned to Ukraine. However, these agreements were not practically implemented. The consideration of many issues was delayed because of delays in negotiations due to the Russian representatives. At the beginning of October 1918, the negotiations were interrupted without reaching a conclusion. The goal had been to conclude a peace treaty between the two states. During the negotiations, the approaches of both parties corresponded to the political courses of the governments of each of the states.

== Final fate of the negotiations ==
With the annulment of the Brest Peace Treaty of the RSFSR with the states of the Quadruple Union, on November 13, 1918, the sides were freed from the implementation of both the Brest agreements and the agreements reached during the Ukrainian–Russian negotiations. This culminated in the invasion of Ukraine by Soviet Russia, in what is now known as the Ukrainian–Soviet War as part of the Ukrainian War of Independence.

== See also ==
- Peace negotiations in the Russian invasion of Ukraine
- November Uprising (Lviv, 1918)

== Sources and literature ==
- Лупандін O. I. (Lupandin O. I.) Мирні переговори між Українською Державою та РСФРР 1918 (Peace negotiations between the Ukrainian State and the RSFSR 1918) – Encyclopedia of the history of Ukraine: in 10 volumes / edited by: V. A. Smoliy (chairman) and others.; Institute of History of Ukraine, National Academy of Sciences of Ukraine (history.org.ua). — Naukova dumka, 2009. — Vol. 6: La — Mi. — 784 p.: fig. — ISBN 978-966-00-1028-4.
- Мирні переговори між Українською Державою та РСФРР 1918 (Peace negotiations between the Ukrainian State and the RSFSR in 1918): Collection of documents and materials. K.–New York–Philadelphia, 1999.
- Дорошенко Д. (Doroshenko D.) Історія України (History of Ukraine): 1917–1923, vol. 2. Uzhhorod, 1932, via archive.org
- Боєчко В. та ін. (Boyechko V. and others) Кордони України: Історична ретроспектива та сучасний стан (Borders of Ukraine: Historical retrospective and current state) chtyvo.org.ua, 1994, ISBN 5-7707-6486-4
- Лупандін O. I. (Lupandin O. I.) Українсько-російські мирні переговори 1918 (Ukrainian-Russian peace negotiations of 1918). In the book: Historical notebooks. K., 1994
