= Soviet occupation of Kharkiv =

Part of Ukrainian–Soviet War

- Part of the Ukrainian–Soviet War
Date	19 December 1917 – 10 January 1918 (3 weeks and 1 day)
Location	Kharkiv, Ukraine
Result	Russian victory

Belligerents
Russian SFSR; Ukrainian People's Republic of Soviets	Ukraine

Commanders and leaders
Vladimir Antonov-Ovseyenko; Mikhail Muravyov; Moisey Rukhimovich	(Ukrainian People's Republic) Omelian Volokh

Strength
10,000	2,700

Casualties and losses
Unknown	Ukrainian troops disarmed 300 join the Reds

The Occupation of Kharkiv was the first episode of the Ukrainian–Soviet War, during which on 23 December 1917, the Russian Bolsheviks seized the Ukrainian city Kharkiv and installed Soviet power there. The Ukrainian authorities failed to expel the Bolsheviks and the last Ukrainian regiments in the city were disarmed on 10 January 1918.

== Events ==
Initially, it was stated that the arrival of the Red troops in Ukraine was due only to the need for the advancement of Soviet troops on the Ukrainian railroad that were heading against the rebellious Russian Whites under Alexey Kaledin, which had occupied Rostov-on-Don on 15 December. In December 1917 the Leninist government was not yet ready for a full-scale war against the Ukrainian People's Republic (UPR).

A complete anarchy was established in Kharkiv, and even the local Bolsheviks and the Kharkiv City Duma urged the withdrawal of violent red detachments from the city.

On the night of 10 January, local Red Guard units unexpectedly disarmed the two regiments of the UPR (2,700 bayonets), which had been trying to preserve dual power (UPR and Bolsheviks) in the city for 20 days. Some 300 disarmed UPR soldiers wished to join the socialist revolution and were enlisted in the Soviet Army as an independent unit, the regiment of the Red Cossacks.

Kharkiv became the capital of the Ukrainian People's Republic of Soviets until 19 April 1918, when German units and the UPR Zaporozhian Division under Petro Bolbochan's command took Kharkiv from the Bolsheviks.

== Sources ==
- Havrylenko, O. A.; Lohvynenko, I. A. (1994). "Більшовицький переворот у Харкові: як це було]" [The Bolshevik coup in Kharkiv: how it happened]. Наукові записки кафедри українознавства Харківського ун-ту [Scientific notes of the Department of Ukrainian Studies of Kharkiv University] (in Ukrainian). Vol. 1. Kharkiv: Kharkiv University. pp. 48–55. Archived from the original on 18 January 2012.
- Kovalchuk, Mykhailo (2015). Битва двох революцій: Перша війна Української Народної Республіки з Радянської Росією [The Battle of Two Revolutions: The First War of the Ukrainian People's Republic with Soviet Russia] (in Ukrainian). Kyiv: Stilos. p. 411. ISBN 9789661931076. OCLC 952158083.
- Savchenko, Viktor (2006). "Первая война большевиков против Украинской Народной Республики (декабрь 1917 — февраль 1918)" [The first war of the Bolsheviks against the Ukrainian People's Republic (December 1917 - February 1918)]. Двенадцать войн за Украину [Twelve wars for Ukraine] (in Russian). Kharkiv: Folio. ISBN 9789660334564. OCLC 266898877.
- Shama, Oleg (20 February 2015). "Червона гвардія. Як більшовики вперше захопили Київ і три тижні грабували та вбивали місцевих мешканців" [Red Guard. How the Bolsheviks first captured Kyiv and looted and killed local residents for three weeks]. NV.ua (in Ukrainian).
