= Soviet occupation of Poltava =

Occupation of Poltava by the Bolsheviks (1918)
- Part of Soviet–Ukrainian War (1917–1921)
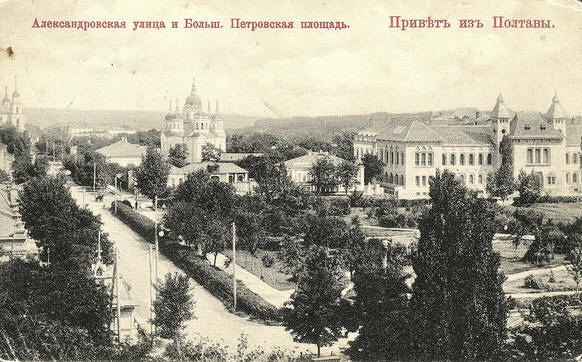
- View of Poltava in the early 20th century
| Date | 19-20 January 1918 |
| Location | Poltava |
| Result | Soviet victory |

Belligerents
| Ukrainian People's Republic | Russian SFSR |

Commanders and leaders
| (Ukrainian People's Republic) Symon Petliura | (Russian Soviet Federative Socialist Republic) Mikhail Artemyevich Muravyov |

Strength
| Army troops loyal to the Central Rada: Part of the 1st Ukrainian Bohdan Khmelnytsky Regiment; Part of Ivan Bohun Regiment; Part of Petro Sahaidachny Regiment; Cavalry Ivan Mazepa Regiment; Vilnius Military School; Omelyan Volokh Detachment | Red Army: Muravyov Detachment (975 soldiers); V. Primakov Red Cossack Regiment; Belenkovich Detachment |

Casualties and losses
| 100 junkers killed | Unknown |

Occupation of Poltava by the Bolsheviks (1918) – seizure of Poltava by the Bolshevik troops on January 19, 1918.

In the Soviet-Ukrainian war the railway junctions of the Left Bank of Ukraine, through which the railways were connected, were important strategic points: Hrebinka, Romodan, Kruty, Bakhmach. Intermediate points of defense for Ukrainian troops were: Sumy, Konotop, Nizhyn, Kostyantynohrad, Poltava. The acquisition of these railway lines and stations were the main task of Soviet troops under V. Antonov.

== Advance of the Bolsheviks ==
On January 18, 1918 Vladimir Antonov-Ovseenko issued a directive on a general advance on Poltava. M. Muravyov was assigned to lead the offensive. Right before his troops left Kharkiv for Poltava, the detachment was increased by 975 bayonets. On the night of March 19, 1918, M. Muravyov's detachment, having in the vanguard an armored train from P. Egorov's group, set out for Poltava. Each of Muravyov's units received specific tasks: Belenkovich's Detachment had to capture and hold the railway station; the Red Cossack Regiment – the buildings of the Cadet Corps, which housed the Vilnius School and the Mazepa Regiment.

On the eve of the offensive, the pro-Ukrainian garrison was significantly weakened by the murder of Yuriy Lastivchenko on 28 December 1917 (O.S. 15 December 1917) at the European ("Yevropejskyj") Hotel (which was later destroyed during World War II). The assassination led to the revenge actions by "bohdanivtsi" (soldiers of the 1st Ukrainian Bohdan Khmelnytsky Regiment), "bohunivtsi" (soldiers of the Ivan Bohun Regiment) and junkers resulting in pogroms of the local Council of People's Commissars and throughout the city. As a result, soldiers from the two regiments were recalled from Poltava to Kyiv in early January. Commander Petro Bolbochan led the main forces to Kremenchuk, retreating without a fight, so the abandoned city was taken with almost no resistance.

Belenkovich's detachment captured the station, as was planned. Primakov's Red Cossacks occupied the telephone exchange station and the provincial administration. At the station, 40 local Red Guards joined Muravyov's troops, and another 50 joined in the city center. After that, Soviet troops surrounded the Cadet Corps building, which housed most of the troops loyal to the Central Rada. Ivan Mazepa and Petro Sahaidachny regiments laid down their arms. The Vilnius School was disarmed with some difficulties, as its cadets put up armed resistance, so some of them were shot. Some of the soldiers, a small group of cadets from the Vilnius School in particular, went to Kyiv instead of their homes, where they later joined the Sloboda Ukraine Haydamaky kish.

== Muravyov's conflict with the local executive committee ==
The first day of the Soviet troops' positioning in Poltava, a conflict arose between Muravyov and the local executive committee of the Council of Workers', Soldiers' and Peasants' Deputies. The latter did not support the armed struggle of the Council of People's Commissars against the Central Rada. During telephone conversations with Antonov, Muravyov said that representatives of the executive committee were skeptical of the "Kharkiv" government, planned to make Poltava neutral in relation to both the Council of People's Commissars and the Central Rada. As a result of Muravyov's threats, the members of the executive committee were forced to leave the city, and Leonard Bochkovsky, member of the Central Rada and Poltava Council of Workers', Soldiers' and Peasants' Deputies, was soon shot.

Vsevolod Petriv, the commander of the Kost Gordienko regiment, mentioned in his memoires the help of the local Red Cossacks in the liberation from the Russian Bolsheviks. He also expressed anger and indignation at the fact that the military leadership of that time did not allow them to join their troops.

== Political consequences ==
Unable to find support among the local Bolsheviks and their allies, Muravyov, under the threat of bayonets, organized such a city Сouncil of Workers' and Soldiers' deputies, which was entirely satisfactory to Antonov, the Kharkiv People's Secretariat, and the Moscow Council of People's Commissars.
