= Ukrainian People's Republic =

1917–18/1918–21 state in Eastern Europe

Coordinates: 50°27′N 30°30′E

Ukrainian People's Republic Українська Народна Республіка (Ukrainian) Ukrainska Narodna Respublika
- 1917–1918; 1918–1921 (Note: Interrupted by the pro-German Ukrainian State in April–December 1918. In exile until 1992.)
- Flag Coat of arms
- Anthem: Ще не вмерла України; Shche ne vmerla Ukrainy "Ukraine has not yet perished"
- State seal

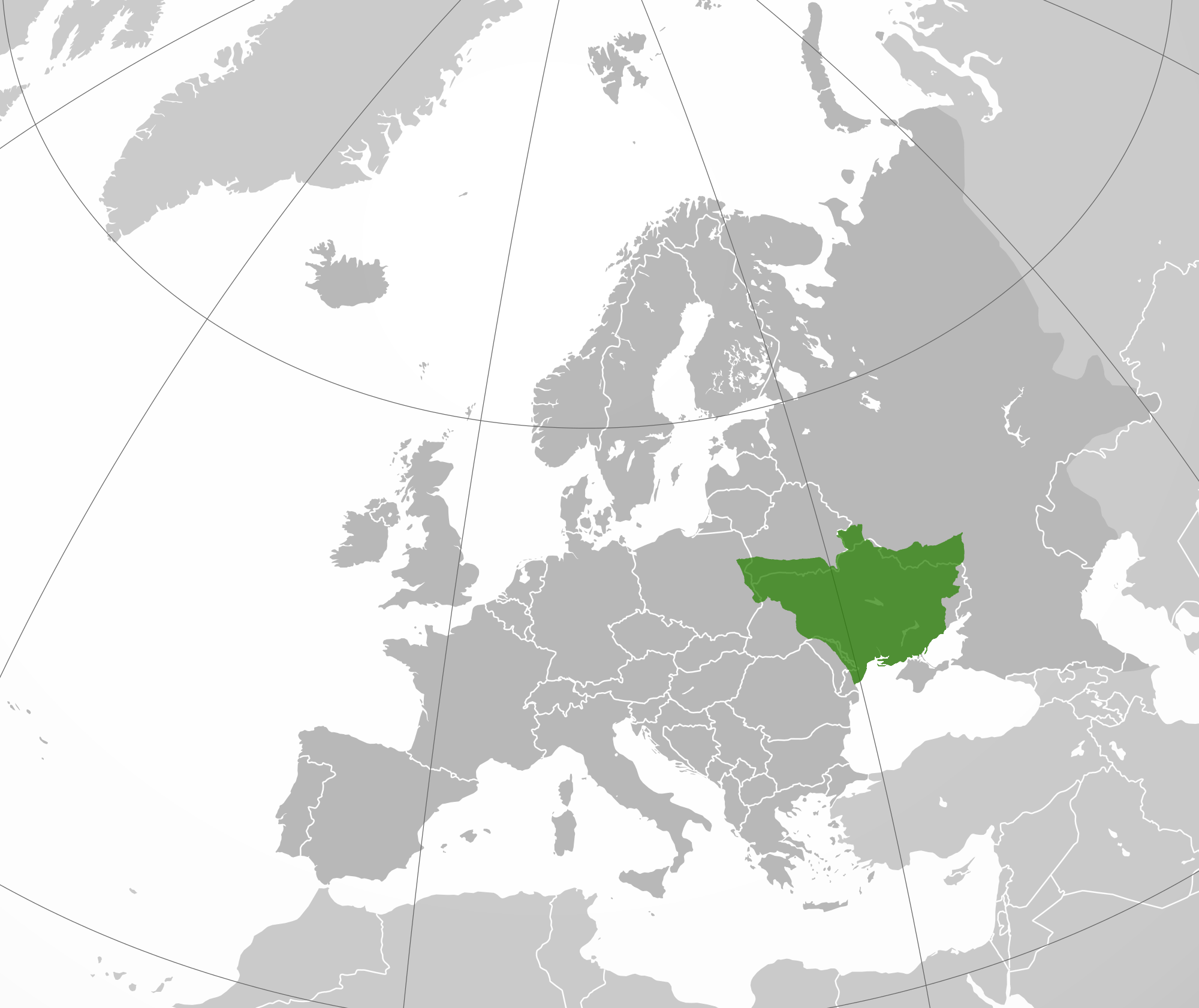
- The Ukrainian People's Republic (green) in 1918 superimposed on modern borders
- Status: Autonomy within the Russian Republic (1917–1917/1918); Partially-recognized state (1917/1918–1921); Government-in-exile (1921–1992)
- Capital: Kiev; Temporary de facto capitals: Kamianets-Podilskyi; Vinnytsia; Zhmerynka; Proskuriv; Rivne
- Common languages: Official: Ukrainian; Minority languages: Russian, Yiddish, Polish, German, Belarusian, Romanian, Bulgarian, Greek, Urum, etc.
- Religion: 85% Eastern Orthodox; 9% Jewish; 4% Roman Catholic; 2% other
- Demonym: Ukrainian
- Government: Provisional parliamentary republic (1917–1918); Provisional directorial parliamentary republic (1918–1920)
- President (Central Council)
  - 1917–1918: Mykhailo Hrushevskyi
- President (Directorate)
  - 1918–1919: Volodymyr Vynnychenko
  - 1919–1920 (Note: In exile, 1920–1926.): Symon Petliura
- Prime minister
  - 1917–1918: Volodymyr Vynnychenko
  - 1918–1919: Volodymyr Chekhivsky
  - 1919: Borys Martos
  - 1919–1920: Isaak Mazepa
  - 1920–1921: Vyacheslav Prokopovych
- Legislature: Central Council (Note: Dictatorship in 1918, Ukrainian Constituent Assembly cancelled due to war); Labor Congress
- Historical era: World War I; Russian Civil War
  - De facto autonomy: 23 June 1917
  - De jure autonomy: 20 November 1917
  - Independence declared: 22 January 1918
  - Directorate formed: 13 November 1918
  - Republic restored: 14 December 1918
  - Unity Act signed: 22 January 1919
  - Peace of Riga: 18 March 1921
  - Authority handed over to post-Soviet Ukraine: 15 March 1992

Area
  - Total: 860,000 km^{2} (330,000 sq mi)
- Currency: Karbovanets; Hryvnia
Preceded by
1917: Russian Republic
1918 April: Ukrainian Soviet Republic
1918 December: Ukrainian State
1919: West Ukrainian People's Republic
Succeeded by
1917: Ukrainian People's Republic of Soviets
1918: Odesa Soviet Republic
Donetsk–Krivoy Rog Soviet Republic
Ukrainian State
Second Polish Republic
South Russia
Makhnovshchina
1919: Ukrainian SSR
1921: Ukrainian govt.-in-exile
1992: Post-Soviet Ukraine

The Ukrainian People's Republic (UPR) (Note: Ukrainian: Українська Народня Республіка, romanized: Ukrainska Narodnia Respublika, in modern orthography Українська Народна Республіка, romanized: Ukrainska Narodna Respublika; abbreviated: УНР, romanized: UNR, lit. 'Ukrainian National Republic [UNR]') (Note: Also translated as Ukrainian Democratic Republic.) was a short-lived state in Eastern Europe. Prior to its proclamation, the Central Council of Ukraine was elected in March 1917 as a result of the February Revolution, and in June declared Ukrainian autonomy within Russia, which was later recognized by the Russian Provisional Government. Following the October Revolution, the Central Council of Ukraine denounced the Bolshevik seizure of power and proclaimed the establishment of the Ukrainian People's Republic in the approximate territory Russian governorates of Kiev, Volhynia, Kharkov, Kherson, Yekaterinoslav, Poltava, Chernigov and Podolia. The republic formally declared its independence from Russia on 22 January 1918.

After the October Revolution, an alternative government known as the Ukrainian People's Republic of Soviets was established in Kharkiv and engaged in a war against the Ukrainian People's Republic, receiving support from Soviet Russia. In addition, both parties were opposed by the White movement, Poland, Green armies, and anarchists, leading to a protracted conflict known as the Ukrainian War of Independence, part of the wider Russian Civil War, and resulting in numerous victims among Ukrainians fighting on different sides of the front. As a result of the fighting, Soviet Russia managed to extend its control over what would ultimately become the Ukrainian Soviet Socialist Republic, which became a founding member of the Soviet Union in 1922.

During its short existence, the republic went through several political transformations – from the socialist-leaning republic headed by the Central Council of Ukraine with its general secretariat, to the socialist republic led by the Directorate and by Symon Petliura. Between April and December 1918, the socialist authority of the Ukrainian People's Republic was suspended, having been overthrown by the pro-German Ukrainian State of Pavlo Skoropadskyi, who was elected as the Hetman of Ukraine by a congress of landowners. After the collapse of the Ukrainian State, the Ukrainian People's Republic declared its unification with the West Ukrainian People's Republic in January 1919. After the Polish–Ukrainian War, it signed an alliance with the Second Polish Republic.

In course of the Polish-Soviet War, the state lost the remainder of its territory to the Bolsheviks. Following the Peace of Riga, signed on 18 March 1921 between Poland, Soviet Russia (acting also on behalf of Soviet Belarus), and Soviet Ukraine, the republic's government continued its activities in exile. Following the Declaration of Independence of Ukraine, the leadership of the Ukrainian People's Republic officially recognized Ukraine as its legal successor and transferred its symbols of power to the Ukrainian president.

== History ==
=== Revolutionary wave ===
The February Revolution in the Russian Empire, which took place on 8-12 March 1917, ended in victory of the democratic forces. In Ukraine, which had been a theatre of the First World War for the previous three years, as well as in Ukrainian communities in other parts of the empire, the revolutionary process took a different path than in the imperial centre, adopting a distinctively national character. Many of the revolutionary soldiers and workers who had overthrown the monarchy in Petrograd belonged to the Ukrainian ethnicity, and some of them were members of a secret Social Democratic organization coordinated by Volodymyr Vynnychenko, who at the time resided in Moscow. Following the revolution, on 13 April a Ukrainian national committee was created in Petrograd, headed by Oleksander Lototsky, and a Ukrainian fraction was formed in the Petrograd Soviet under the leadership of Oleksander Shulhyn.

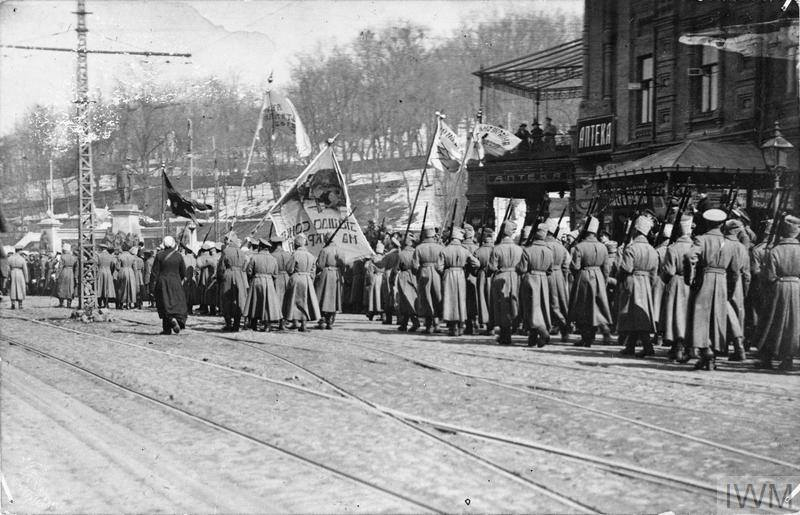
A soldiers' demonstration in Kyiv, March 1917

On 17 March 1917 the Ukrainian Central Council (Central Rada) was established in Kyiv on the base of the local branch of the Society of Ukrainian Progressists. It became the centre of Ukrainian political life under the leadership of professor Mykhailo Hrushevsky, who arrived to Kyiv following his liberation from exile on 9 April. Hrushevsky's program articles in the Nova Rada daily newspaper, which started publishing soon thereafter turned him into an undisputed leader of the Ukrainian national movement. On 13 April a major demonstration took place in the Sofiyska Square, involving around 100,000 participants, many of whom waved blue-and-yellow flags and sang the Ukrainian national anthem. During the event, Hrushevsky delivered a speech, proclaiming the liberation of Ukraine from centuries-old subjugation and accepted a pledge of allegiance from the people to their country.

In parallel, the Ukrainian movement started organizing itself institutionally. Starting from early April, Prosvita was reestablished, the Ukrainian Cooperative Committee was founded, and the Temporary Military Council was created. During the same time, Andrey Sheptytsky was liberated from Russian imprisonment and allowed to return to Galicia. On 10 April the Ukrainian Central Council supported the convocation of the Ukrainian National Congress, and on 11 April the Ukrainian Military Society of Hetman Polubotok headed by Mykola Mikhnovsky was established and started works on organization of the 1st Ukrainian Volunteer Regiment of Bohdan Khmelnytsky.

On 19-21 April the Ukrainian National Congress took place in Kyiv, involving about 900 delegates. The Congress confirmed the election of the Ukrainian Central Council of 150 members headed by Mykhailo Hrushevsky. On 17 May the commander of the Southwestern Front General Brusilov permitted the organization of the Bohdan Khmelnytsky Regiment which drafted 3,574 volunteers. Starting from 18 May, the Ukrainian Military Congress took place in Kyiv, attended by over 700 delegates. The Congress elected the Ukrainian General Military Committee of 18 members headed by Symon Petliura.

Major political Ukrainian parties which established themselves after the creation of the Central Rada were the Ukrainian Party of Socialist Federalists (headed by Serhiy Yefremov), Ukrainian Social-Democratic Labour Party (Vynnychenko), Ukrainian Socialist-Revolutionary Party (supported by Hrushevsky) and Spilka. Among less influential forces were the Ukrainian Party of Socialist Independists and the Ukrainian Democratic Agriculturalist Party (established in Lubny), both of whom proclaimed the goal of immediate independence of Ukraine, as well as the Ukrainian Federal Democratic Party (Volodymyr Naumenko), whose leadership opposed the separation of Ukraine and pursued a moderate social program.

=== Declaration of autonomy ===
The attempts of Central Rada to establish itself as the main political force in Ukraine were opposed both by a significant part of local workers and revolutionary soldiers, who viewed Ukrainian autonomism as a "stab in the back" against the Revolution, and by the Provisional Government. In March the Russian revolutionary cabinet headed by Georgy Lvov allowed the establishment of the post of representative in Ukrainian affairs, appointed Dmytro Doroshenko, Oleksander Lototsky and Ivan Kraskovsky as governors in Galicia and Bukovina, restored Ukrainians' rights in the occupied territories of Austria-Hungary and permitted the introduction of Ukrainian language in schools and administration of Ukrainian lands. However in May the Provisional Government refused to allow Ukrainian representatives to attend planned international conferences, declined the plan for establishment of a special commissariat of Ukrainian affairs and took a negative attitude to Ukrainization of the armed forces and liberation of arrested Galician Ukrainians. A hostile position against Ukrainian autonomy demands was also taken by the Petrograd Council.

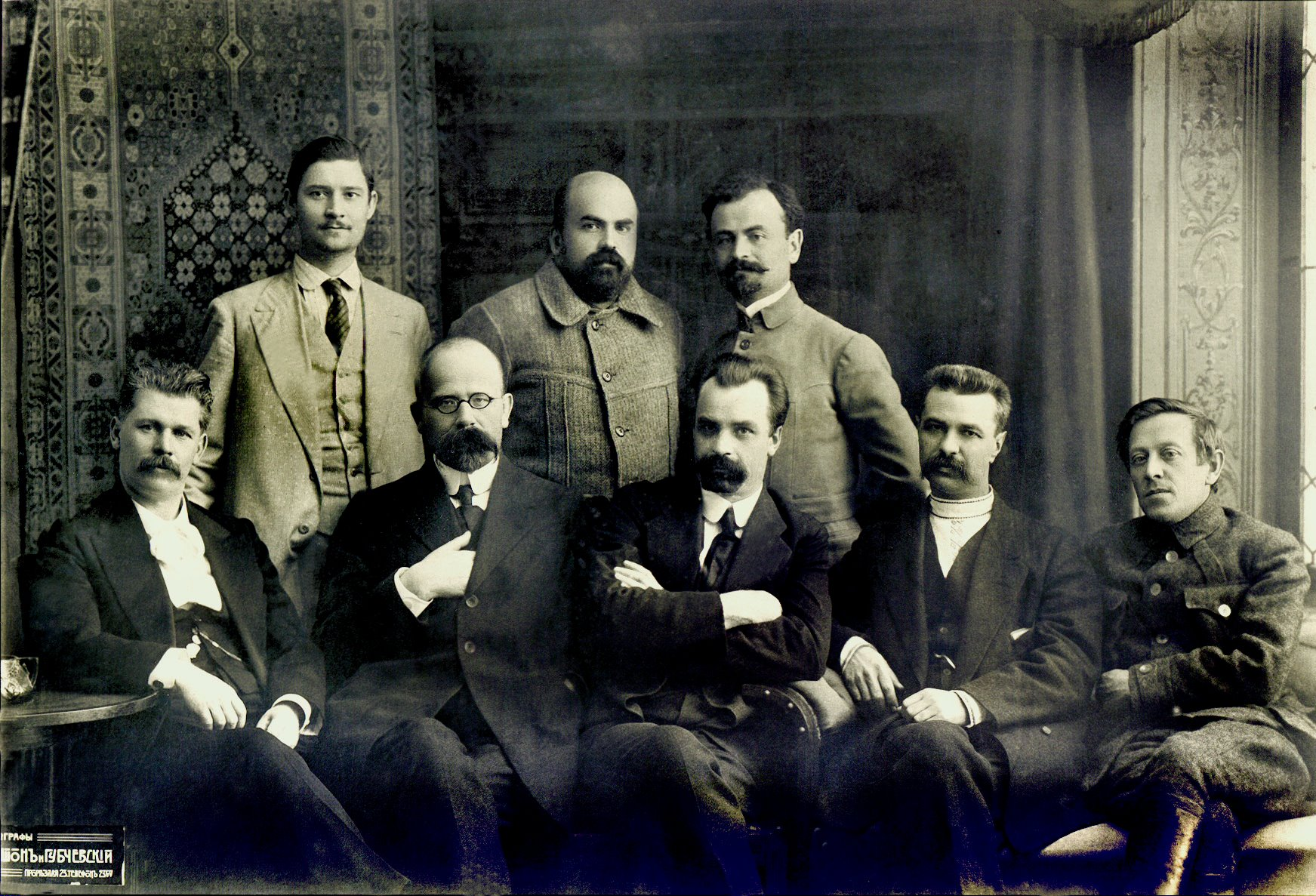
Members of the General Secretariat in July 1917

On 10–15 June 1917 the 1st All-Ukrainian Peasant Congress took place in Kyiv with participation of 2,200 delegates. On 11 June an extraordinary congress of the council of Doroshenko Ukrainian Military Society in Simferopol took a decision to create a separate Ukrainian regiment. Between 18 and 24 June, ignoring the prohibition of the Russian Provisional Government, the 2nd Ukrainian Military Congress took place in Kyiv. The congress accepted the declaration of a detailed plan of Ukrainization of Russian Army units, leaving Symon Petliura as the head of the Ukrainian General Military Committee, and acted to regulate the issue of Free Cossacks. The congress showed its support to the Ukrainian Central Council. The council of Kharkov Governorate recognized the Ukrainian Central Council as a government authority in Ukraine.

On 24 June 1917, the Central Council of Ukraine declared its autonomy as part of the Russian Republic by its First Universal at the All-Ukrainian Military Congress. The highest governing body of the Ukrainian People's Republic became the General Secretariat headed by Volodymyr Vynnychenko, which was elected on 28 June. The non-Ukrainian revolutionary forces perceived the composition of the new government as usurpation of power by the Central Rada. However, the organ's power couldn't be ignored, and eventually both the Provisional Government and the Petrograd Council favoured negotiations with the Ukrainian side.

=== Attempts of compromise with the Provisional Government ===
On 11 July a delegation of the Russian Provisional Government composed of Prime Minister Alexander Kerensky, foreign minister Mikhail Tereshchenko, transport minister Nikolai Nekrasov and minister of the post Irakli Tsereteli arrived to Kyiv. As a result of talks with Hrushevsky, Vynnychenko and Petliura, the Provisional Government recognized the Secretariat, appointing it as the representative governing body of the Russian Provisional Government and limiting its powers to five governorates: Volyn, Kiev, Podolia, Chernigov, and Poltava. On 14 July the Ukrainian Central Council created the Petty Council consisting of 40 representatives from Ukrainians and 18 from national minorities. On 16 July that organ adopted the Second Universal of the Ukrainian Central Council, and on 29 July – the Statute of the Supreme Government of Ukraine.

The Second Universal declared Ukraine's course for autonomy inside of Russia, which was to be officially approved by the future Russian Constituent Assembly. In addition, it ordered the inclusion of at least 30% of ethnic minority representatives into the Central Council, making it a full-fledged Ukrainian parliament. The General Secretariat was reformed as well, including four members from the Russian, Polish and Jewish minorities and turning into an institution of the Provisional Government, which removed its subordination to the Central Rada. At first Vynnychenko protested against that decision and left his post as the Secretariat's leader, but eventually returned to reassemble the organ after the Central Rada issued the Second Universal. According to the 17 August Instruktsiya (Temporary Instruction) of the Russian Provisional Government, it recognized the competency of the General Secretariat over five Governorates: Kiev, Volyn, Poltava, Chernihiv, and Podillia. Other territories could recognize the Secretariat's rule in their territories according to decisions of their local governments. At the same time, the Provisional Government was forced to formally recognize Ukraine as an administrative unit of its own.

=== Breakdown of relations with Petrograd ===
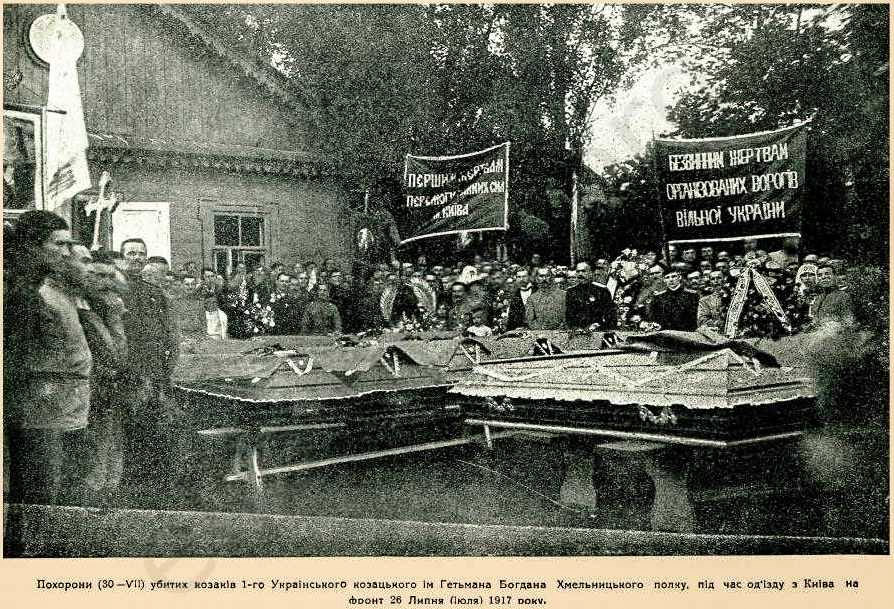
Funeral of Cossacks from Bohdan Khmelnytsky Regiment killed in August 1917 in Kyiv

Despite the formal recognition of Ukrainian autonomy, in reality the Provisional Government failed to act upon its own Instruction, and systematically hindered the operations of Central Rada. This attitude was contributed to by the failure of Ukrainian parties in city duma elections during the summer. Ukrainization of army units was also hindered by authorities in Petrograd, and on 8 August a terrorist attack took place at the Post-Volynsky railroad station in Kyiv, where the newly formed Bohdan Khmelnytsky Regiment was attacked by the Moscow cuirassiers and Don Cossacks. The new General Secretariat headed by Vynnychenko was approved by the Provisional Government only on 14 September.

Between 21 and 28 September 1917, the Congress of the Enslaved Peoples of Russia was organized in Kyiv at the initiative of Central Rada. Its members adopted a program of immediate transformation of the Russian state into a federation of free peoples. Simultaneously, the administrative apparatus of the Provisional Government started failing, which caused organizational difficulties and lack of financial support for the General Secretariat. On 22 September the Petty Council adopted the declaration about the future convention of the Ukrainian Constituent Assembly; at the same time, representatives of national minorities in the council condemned the intentions of Ukraine to separate from Russia. On 13 October, after a petition by the Kyiv Court Chamber, the Russian Provisional Government initiated an investigation against the General Secretariat for its intention to convene the assembly.

=== Ukraine after the October Revolution ===
Following the news about the 7 November October Revolution in Petrograd, the Petty Council created the Regional Committee in Protection of Revolution in Ukraine. The committee announced the extension of its powers over nine Ukrainian governorates. General Kvetsinsky, head of the Kiev Military District subordinated to the Provisional Government, refused to recognize the Regional Committee, which soon dissolved, transferring all of its powers to the General Secretariat. On 8 November the Ukrainian Central Council adopted a resolution which condemned the revolution in Petrograd. In protest, the Bolsheviks left the Regional Committee and the council. On the same day, the Kyiv faction of the Bolshevik Party instigated an uprising in Kyiv in order to establish Soviet power in the city. Forces of Kiev Military District attempted to stop the revolt, but after the Rada threw its support behind the local Bolsheviks, the district's command was forced to leave the city, moving to the Don. Not feeling confident enough at the time, the Bolsheviks refused to turn their weapons against the Rada. On 11 November the Central Council adopted a bill on elections to the Ukrainian Constituent Assembly, handing it for final approval by the Petty Council. On 16 November the Rada and the General Secretary were declared to be supreme state authorities, and General Secretary of Military Affairs Symon Petliura subordinated the Kyiv militia (law enforcement) to the Ukrainian government.

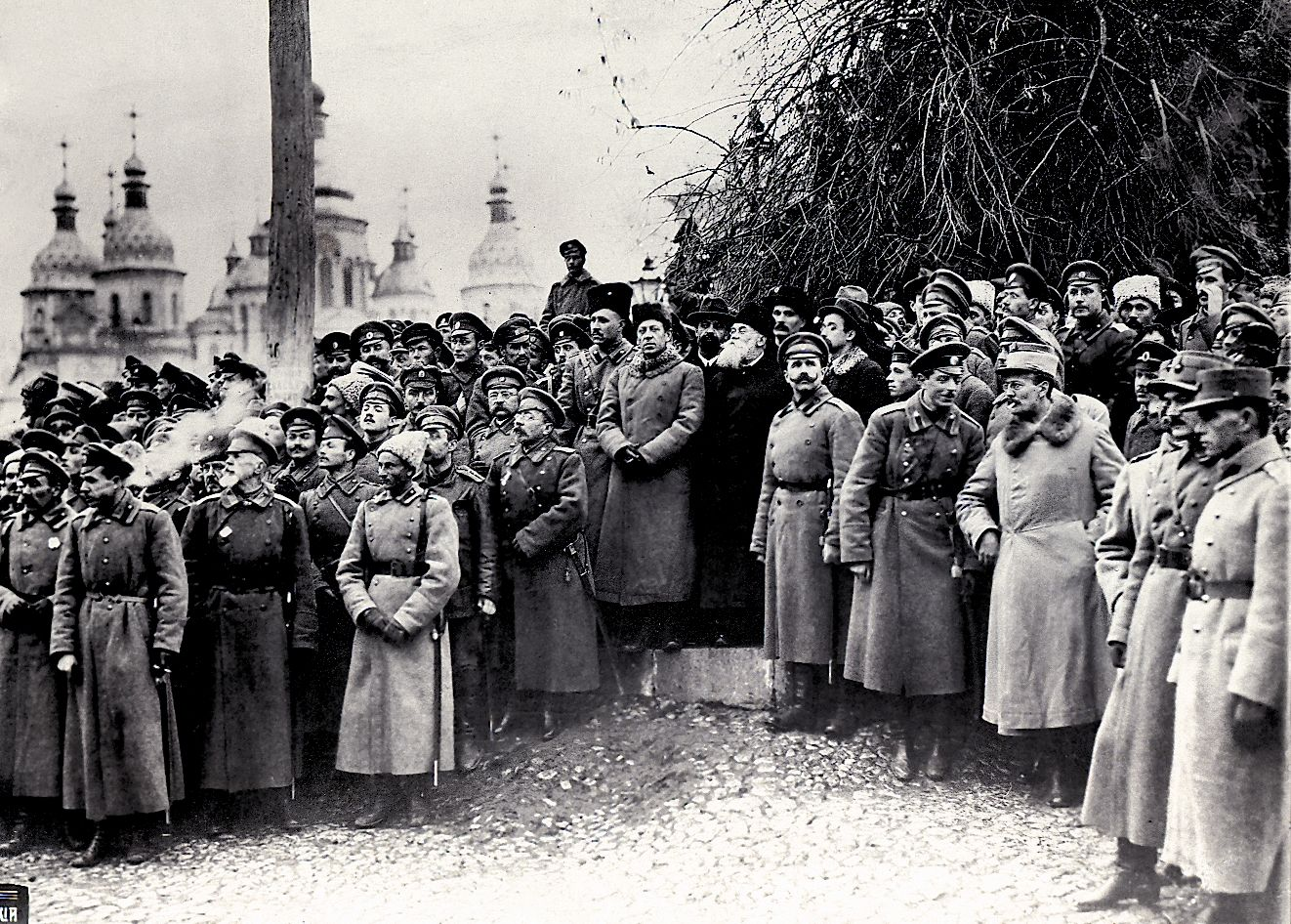
Petliura, Vynnychenko and Hrushevsky during a meeting in Kyiv's Sofiyska Square, November 1917

After expelling the Provisional Government's forces, Central Rada announced a wider autonomy for the Ukrainian Republic, while still maintaining ties to Russia. The territory of the republic was defined by the Third Universal adopted on 20 November 1917 (7 November by Old Style) and included the governorates of Volyn, Kiev, Podillia, Chernihiv, Poltava, Kharkiv, Katerynoslav, Kherson and Taurida (except of Crimea). It also stated that the people of Voronezh, Kholm, and Kursk governorates were welcome to join the republic through a referendum. Additionally, the Universal stated that in absence of a legitimate government in the Russian Republic after the October Revolution, Central Rada would function as the supreme governing body in Ukraine until order could be restored. The Rada condemned all revolutionary activities such as the October Revolution to be threatening with civil war and expressed its hopes for a peaceful resolution of the crisis. On the day of the Universal's publication, Russian Cadet deputy V. Krupkov and Polish representative W. Rudnicki surrendered their mandates at the Central Council. On 22 November the document was solemnly proclaimed at Kyiv's Sofiyska Square in the presence of French, Italian, and Romanian diplomatic missions.

In addition to its political content, the Third Universal proclaimed the freedom of speech and press, free practice of religion, permitted the organization of congresses, conventions and strikes, guaranteed inviolability of personality and private residence, right to use native languages, amnesty and just trial. Death penalty was abolished along with private ownership on land. Right of workers' control over industrial enterprises was recognized along with eight-hour working day. Ethnic minorities were provided the right of national personal autonomy, and a reform of local government was declared.

Map of the results of the 1917 Russian Constituent Assembly election by constituency.

The 1917 Russian Constituent Assembly election in late November demonstrated mass popular support for the Central Rada in regions under its control, with Ukrainian parties winning around 75% of total votes, compared to only 10% supporting the Bolsheviks. On 21 November the General Secretary of Military Affairs Symon Petliura appointed General Pavlo Skoropadsky as commander of the armed forces in Right-bank Ukraine. On 27 November the Ukrainian Central Council adopted a resolution regarding the Kholm Governorate, protesting against its annexation by Poland.

On 30 November the Petty Council adopted the Law "On the Ukrainian Constituent Assembly" establishing its composition of 301 members from the following regions:

  - Kiev Governorate – 45
  - Volyn Governorate – 30
  - Podillia Governorate – 30
  - Katerynoslav Governorate – 36
  - Poltava Governorate – 30
  - Kherson Governorate – 34
  - Kharkiv Governorate – 35
  - Taurida Governorate – 9
  - Chernihiv Governorate – 27
  - Ostrohozk district – 15

Each deputy represented 100,000 inhabitants, and the right of vote was provided to citizens of 20 years and older; the Central Election Commission to observe the election was established. The election took place on 9 January 1918, but only 171 delegates could be elected.

=== Conflict with the Bolsheviks ===
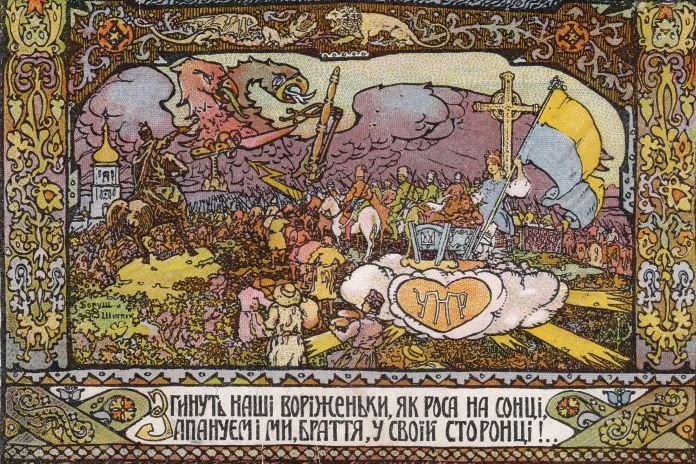
UPR postcard depicting a group with the yellow-blue flag and anthem lyrics, defending themselves from a Russian double-headed eagle. (November–December 1917)

On 30 November the General Secretariat refused to recognize Sovnarkom as a legal authority of Russia. After a brief truce, the Bolsheviks realized that the Rada had no intention of supporting their revolution. After breaking relations with the Central Rada, Bolshevik forces in Kyiv started preparing to organize a rebellion. However, on the night of 13 December, the day of the planned uprising in Kyiv, the conspirators and their armed supporters were detained by Ukrainian authorities and deported from the country. Simultaneously, the 1st Ukrainian Corps of general Skoropadsky joined the Free Cossacks and disarmed elements of the 2nd Guards Corps, which were moving on Kyiv under the leadership Yevgenia Bosch, and deported them to Russia across Belarus.

On 17 December the Sovnarkom issued an ultimatum to the Ukrainian government, which, while formally recognizing Ukraine's autonomy, demanded that its authorities ban the movement of Don Cossacks from the front and stop disarming Bolshevik troops in its territory. The ultimatum, seen as a pretext for occupation of Ukraine, was declined by Kyiv. At the same time, the All-Ukrainian Council of Soviets was organized in Kyiv. On 19 December the Congress expressed its complete trust in the Ukrainian Central Council and General Secretariat and condemned the ultimatum of Lenin-Trotsky. Having suffered a defeat, Bolshevik representatives at the congress moved to Kharkiv and joined with Soviet deputies from Donbas and Kryvbas districts, declaring themselves to be the "First All-Ukrainian Congress of Soviets". The congress declared the government of the Ukrainian People's Republic to be illegal and proclaimed the Ukrainian People's Republic of Soviets with its capital in Kyiv, establishing the People's Secretariat of Ukraine and the All-Ukrainian Central Executive Committee, which it declared to be the only legitimate organs of power in the country. Soon afterwards the Red Guard entered Left-bank Ukraine from the areas of Gomel and Bryansk in support of the newly proclaimed Soviet government.

In addition to the invading Russian troops, Bolsheviks controlled forces of Bolshevized soldiers and workers in various locations around Ukraine, especially on the anti-German front and in the areas of Donbas and Kharkiv. Those troops engaged in rebellion against Ukrainian authorities. Many ethnically Ukrainian units declared their neutrality, and those who wished to defend Kyiv had difficulties with breaking through Bolshevik-controlled territories around the front, meanwhile the majority of Free Cossacks concentrated on defending their own local territories. As a result, the only reliable military force available to the Central Rada were volunteer troops and Kyiv's Free Cossack worker troops headed by Mykhailo Kovenko.

On 25 December 1917 four groups of a 30-thousand strong Bolshevik army under command of Vladimir Antonov-Ovseenko entered Ukrainian territory, and on the next day occupied Kharkiv. From there Ovseenko's troops moved in the direction of Poltava and Lozova, occupying Katerynoslav on 9 January and Oleksandrivsk on 15 January. Poltava fell on 20 January. Meanwhile the Bryansk group commanded by Znamensky occupied Hlukhiv on 19 January and Konotop on the 26th. Moving from Poltava, troops under command of Mikhail Muravyov took Romodan and advanced on Bakhmach, taking the city on 27 January. In Bakhmach all three groups of Bolshevik forces united and advanced on Kyiv.

Among the conflict between Bolsheviks and the Central Rada, a series of regional Soviet republics on the territory of Ukraine proclaimed their independence and allegiance to the Petrograd Sovnarkom, including the Odesa Soviet Republic and Donetsk-Krivoi Rog Soviet Republic. The latter was created by a direct decree of Lenin as part of the Russian SFSR with its capital in Kharkiv, and was headed by Fyodor Sergeyev who became the chairman of the local government as well as member of the Soviet government of Ukraine. Unlike the latter, the Odesa Republic was not recognized by any other Bolshevik government and on its own initiative entered a military conflict with Romania for control over the Moldavian Democratic Republic, whose territory it was contesting.

=== Proclamation of independence ===
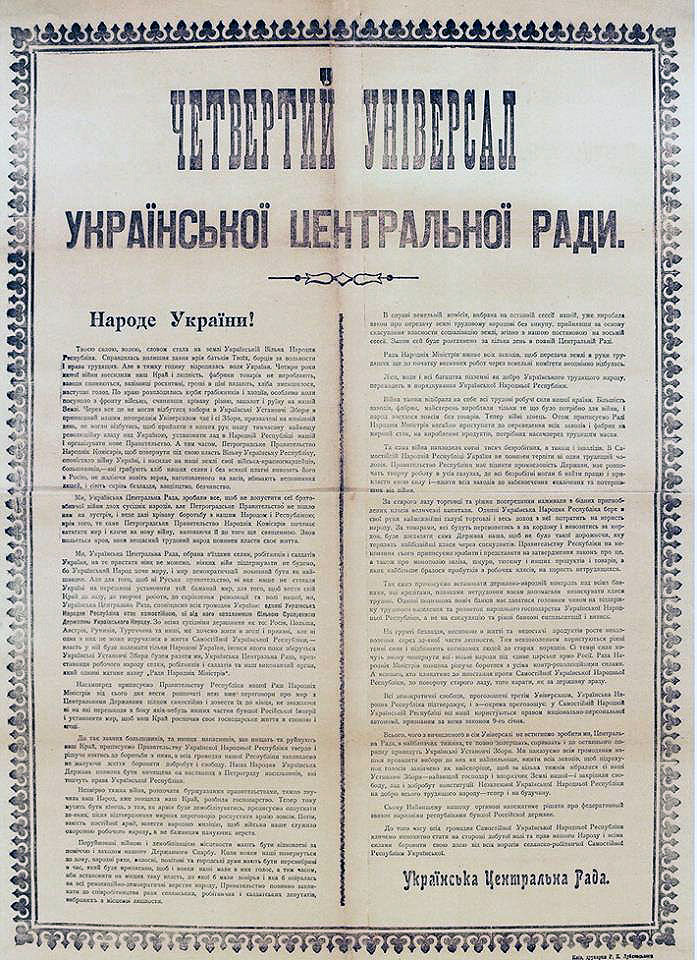
Fourth Universal of the Central Rada

On 14–15 December the Petty Council adopted the Law on the General Court, the highest judicial institution of the Ukrainian People's Republic. International diplomatic missions transferred their offices from Mohyliv-Podilsky to Kyiv. The government of France on 18 December announced its intention to establish diplomatic relations with Ukraine. England declared a similar intention. On 22 December the Petty Council adopted the Law on taxes and duties, according to which all taxes and duties belonged to the State Treasury of Ukraine.

On 23 December the General Secretariat determined the composition of the Ukrainian delegation at the peace talks in Brest-Litovsk, and on 25 December Ukraine was officially invited through a telegram to join the negotiations. On 3 January 1918 General Georges Tabouis was appointed the Commissar of French Republic to the Government of Ukrainian People's Republic. At the start of peace negotiations in Brest on 6 January, the head of Ukrainian delegation Vsevolod Holubovych requested the recognition of Ukraine as a sovereign state, attachment of the Kholm Governorate to its territory and conduction of a plebiscite in territories of Austria-Hungary where Ukrainian population dominated. On 10–12 January the Central Powers recognized the Ukrainian delegation at the talks in Brest as separate and allowed it to conduct negotiations on behalf of the Ukrainian People's Republic.

Amid the ongoing war against the Bolsheviks, on 16 January the Petty Council adopted the law about creation of the Ukrainian National Army recruited on the base of militia principle. Due to the aggression from Soviet Russia, on 22 January 1918, the Central Rada issued its Fourth Universal, breaking ties with Bolsheviks and proclaiming a sovereign Ukrainian state. On the same day, the law on National-Individual Autonomy was adopted.

The Fourth Universal renamed the General Secretariat into Council of Ministers, replaced the regular army with militia, established state control over trade and banking, ordered elections of local councils and appointed the convention of Constituent Assembly. Central Rada approved an agrarian law, which included the nationalization of land, and introduced the 8-hour working day.

=== Brest treaty ===
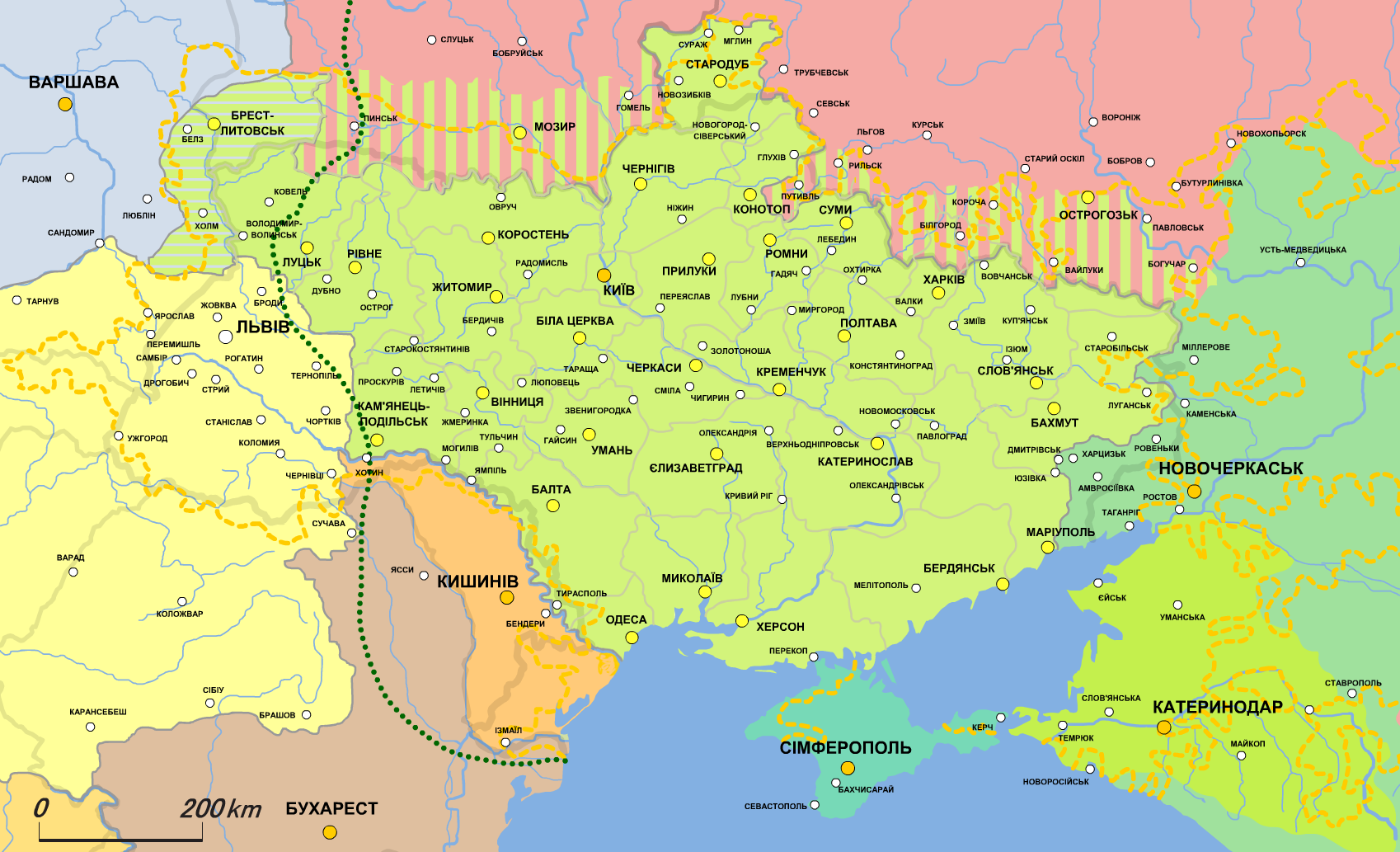
Treaty of Brest-Litovsk (9 February 1918): Ukrainian People's Republic Claimed territories (striped) German troops in autumn, 1917 Soviet Russia Don regional government Kuban regional government Crimea regional government Austria-Hungary Polish council Romania Moldova Serbia

On 29 January 1918 the Battle of Kruty contributed to a slowdown of the Bolshevik advance on Kyiv. Simultaneously, a pro-Bolshevik workers' uprising started in the capital, distracting a number of Ukrainian units from the front. Besieged by the Bolsheviks and having lost much of its territory, the Rada was forced to seek foreign aid, and signed the Treaty of Brest-Litovsk on 9 February 1918 to obtain military help from the German and Austro-Hungarian Empires, whose governments in their turn were interested in procuring Ukrainian grain to supply their own populations. The treaty was signed on the day of Kyiv's fall to the Red Army, and due to the advance of Bolshevik forces the government of Ukraine was evacuated to Zhytomyr. After taking Kyiv, Muravyov's troops engaged in a campaign of mass terror against the city's population. In Volhynia elements of the former 7th Army occupied Proskuriv, Zhmerynka, Koziatyn, Berdychiv, Rivne and Shepetivka, meanwhile Ukrainian forces were able to gain control over the railway line connecting Zhytomyr, Korosten and Sarny.

According to the Brest treaty, territories of the Ukrainian People's Republic expanded to include lands in Kholm region to the east of the line Tarnogród-Biłgoraj-Szczebrzeszyn-Krasnystaw-Puchaczów-Radyn-Międzyrzec-Sarniki, but the exact border was to be determined by a special commission with participation of the Polish side. Ukraine also issued claims on Galicia and Bukovyna, but those were declined by Austro-Hungarian foreign minister Ottokar von Czernin, who only agreed to unify both entities into a single Crown land. Both sides mutually refrained from demanding reparations. The treaty also regulated supplies of agricultural and industrial goods, established the principles of customs, judicial, consular and diplomatic relations, exchange of prisoners of war etc.

=== Occupation by Central Powers ===
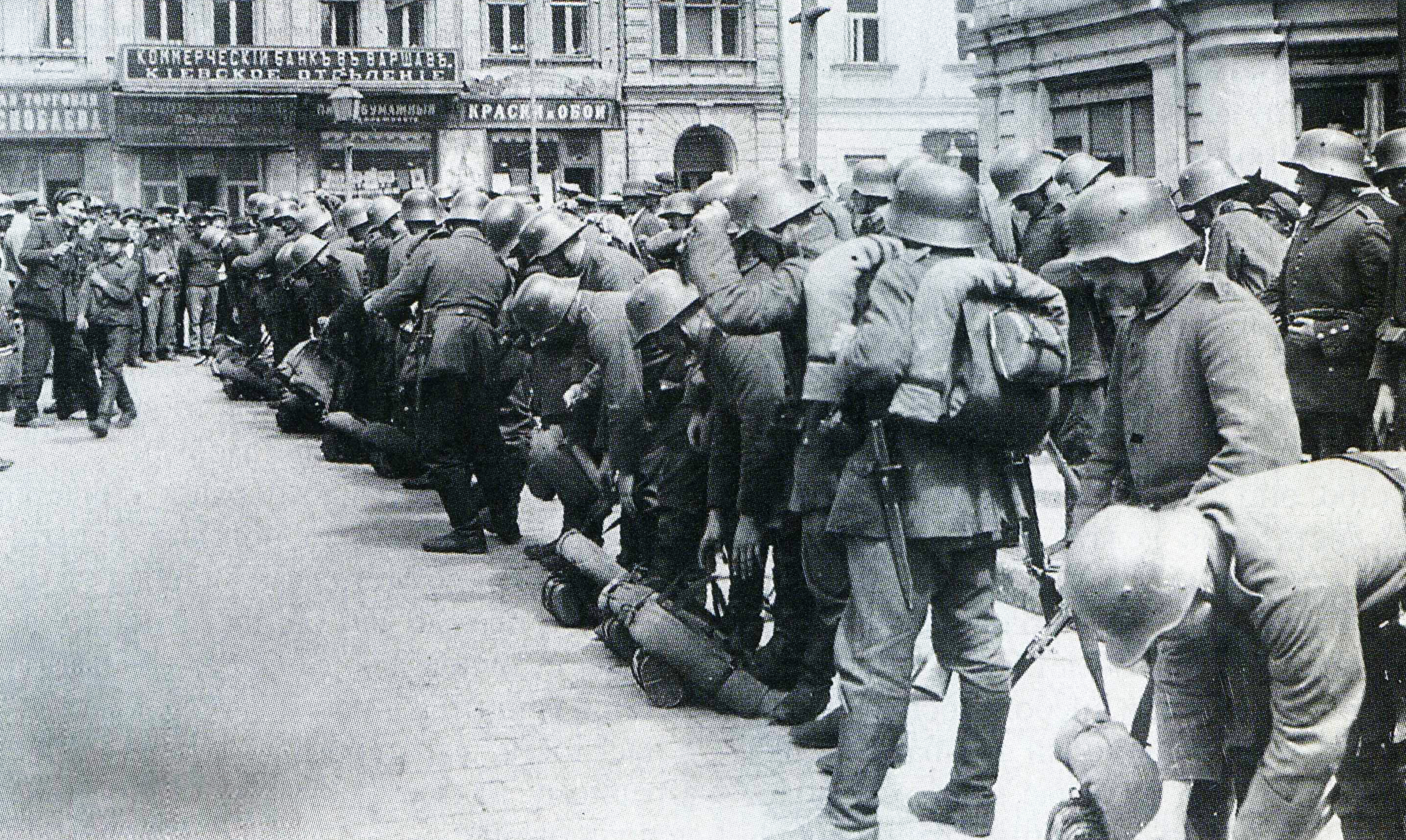
German troops in Kyiv, 1918

Following the signing of Brest agreement, on 12 February the Ukrainian People's Republic issued an official appeal for Germany to provide help in forcing the Bolsheviks out of Ukraine. On 24 February German forces started advancing on the northern section of the front, with Austro-Hungarian troops, including the Ukrainian Sich Riflemen, joining them three days later in the south. Ukrainian troops took part in the advance of Central Powers and experienced an influx of volunteers. After several successful actions against the Bolsheviks, on 1 March 1918 the Ukrainian army under command of K. Prisovsky and S. Petliura entered Kyiv, followed by German forces who arrived several days later.

On 20 February 1918 the council of the Kuban People's Republic accepted the resolution for a federal union of Kuban with Ukraine as Bolshevik forces pushed towards Yekaterinodar. It was agreed to forward the resolution for ratification to the Ukrainian government. On 27 February the Ukrainian Central Council adopted the law about the introduction of a new style calendar, according to which all dates were moved 13 days ahead. The Petty Council adopted the law on the new monetary system, establishing hryvnia consisting of 8.712 units of pure gold, as currency. The law establishing the coat of arms of the Ukrainian People's Republic – the Trident (Tryzub) was adopted on the same day. On 2 March the Petty Council adopted the law on citizenship of Ukraine and the law on new administrative system. The Russian established gubernias were to be replaced by a new administrative unit – zemlia (land). After the expulsion of Bolshevik forces, on 18 March several students fallen at the Battle of Kruty were reburied in Kyiv. Convocation of the Ukrainian Constituent Assembly was planned for 11 April – 12 May 1918.

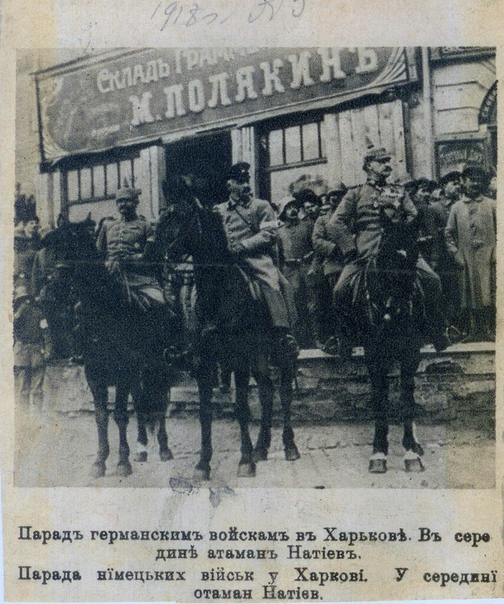
Joint military parade of Ukrainian and German forces in Kharkiv, 1918

By the end of April, German troops and the Ukrainian Zaporozhian Division commanded by general Natiyev had finished the liberation of Left-bank Ukraine from the Bolsheviks. Meanwhile troops of otamans Bolbochan and Sikevych entered Crimea and reached the borders of Don. However, on demand of the Germans Ukrainians had to evacuate Crimea, as it was not recognized as part of Ukrainian territory. The campaign's success was contributed by the use of armoured trains in combination with cavalry. By April 1918 the German-Austrian offensive had completely removed the Bolsheviks from Ukraine. The Central Powers' victories in Ukraine were caused by the apathy of the locals and the inferior fighting skills of Bolshevik troops compared to their Austro-Hungarian and German counterparts. In April 1918 troops loyal to the Ukrainian People's Republic took control of several cities in the Donbas region. By the end of August 1918, over 30 divisions of German and Austro-Hungarian troops were stationed in Ukraine.

On 13 April the Central Council adopted a resolution condemning the annexation of Bessarabia by Romania. On 23 April an economic treaty was signed between Ukraine, Germany and Austria-Hungary, and on 25 April the law on the Central Economic Council of Ukraine was adopted. Concurrently with all these events and a few days prior to the change of power in the country, on 24 April 1918 the government of Belarus confirmed the establishment of Belarusian Chamber of Commerce in Kyiv headed by Mitrofan Dovnar-Zapolsky on the initiative of the Belarusian secretary of finance Pyotr Krechevsky.

After the treaty of Brest-Litovsk, Ukraine became a virtual protectorate of the German Empire which at that time seemed more favorable than being overrun by the Soviet forces that were spreading havoc in the country. Germany was anxious about losing the war and was trying to speed up the process of food extraction from Ukraine, so it decided to install its own administration in the person of Generalfeldmarschall von Eichhorn who replaced the Colonel General Alexander von Linsingen. On 6 April the commander of the Army group Kijew issued an order in which he explained his intentions to execute the conditions of the treaty. That, of course, conflicted with the laws of the Ukrainian government, which annulled his order.

=== Deposition of Central Rada ===
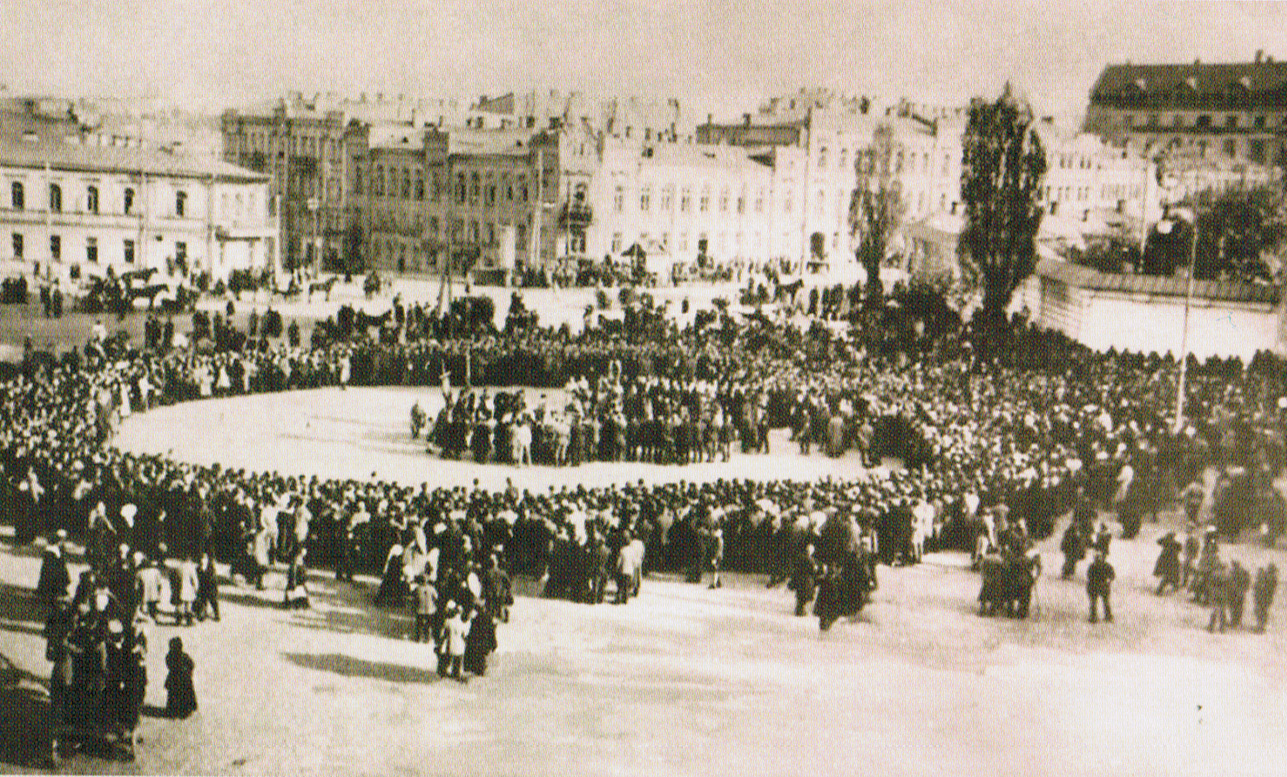
A religious service in Kyiv's Sofiyska Square following the election of Skoropadsky as Hetman of Ukraine

The arrival of German and Austrian troops to Ukraine resulted in a significant change in the country's politics. The left-wing Central Rada, which was dominated by the Socialist Revolutionary Party, was perceived by the occupying forces as unable to establish law and order, meanwhile the Central Powers' attempts to prevent stealing of grain and restore the export of goods were seen by the Ukrainian government as foreign intrusion in its internal affairs. The ruling regime was unpopular among large parts of the Ukrainian population, especially landowners and richer peasants.

By the end of April 1918 Germans were increasingly acting as an occupying force. On 25 April Generalfeldmarschall von Eichhorn ordered the introduction of military court-martials in Ukrainian territory, and on 26-27 April German forces disarmed the Ukrainian Bluecoats division. On 28 April German soldiers entered a session of the Central Rada and performed a search of its members, arresting two government ministers. These actions were strongly condemned by the Central Rada and broader society.

On 29 April, the All-Ukrainian Agrarian Congress elected Pavlo Skoropadsky the Hetman of Ukraine. Immediately thereafter, the Germans arrested and disbanded the Central Rada, aiming to stop the social reforms initiated by the organ, and restarted the process of food supply transfer to Germany and Austria-Hungary. The German authorities also arrested the Ukrainian Prime Minister, Vsevolod Holubovych, on terrorist charges, and thus disbanded the Council of People's Ministers. Prior to this, the Rada had approved the Constitution of the Ukrainian People's Republic, limited large-scale ownership of land and elected Mykhailo Hrushevsky as the country's president.

=== Establishment of the Hetmanate ===
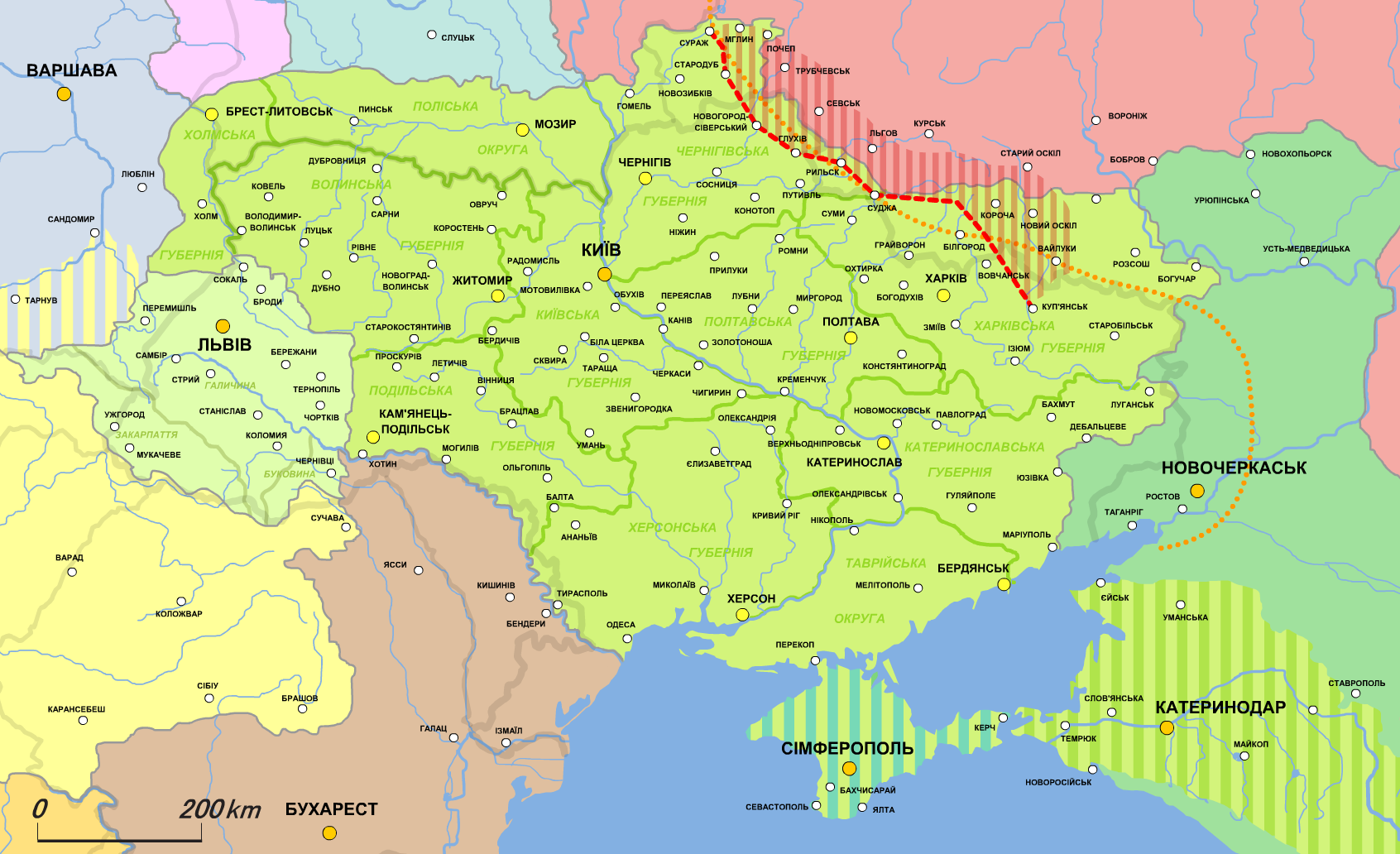
May–November, 1918: Ukrainian State Territories of Ukrainian Union (striped) Crimean Regional Government Kuban People's Republic West Ukrainian People's Republic (19 Oct) Don Republic Belarusian People's Republic Lithuania Poland Austria-Hungary Romania Serbia Soviet Russia

After the coup, the Rada was replaced by the conservative government of hetman Pavlo Skoropadsky, and the Ukrainian People's Republic by the Ukrainian State (Hetmanate). Skoropadsky, a former officer of the Russian Empire, established a regime favoring large landowners and concentrating power at the top. The government had little support from Ukrainian activists, but unlike the socialist Rada, it was able to introduce an effective administrative organization, established diplomatic ties with many countries, and concluded a peace treaty with Soviet Russia. In a few months, the Hetmanate also printed millions of Ukrainian language textbooks, established many Ukrainian schools, two universities, and the Ukrainian Academy of Sciences.

One day after Skoropadsky's election, on 30 April 1918 Mykola Vasylenko was appointed the Chairman of Council of Ministers and tasked with the formation of a new government. On 7 May the new Council of Ministers confirmed its intentions to attach Crimea to the Ukrainian State, and on 15 May it signed a treaty with Germany and Austria-Hungary, according to which Ukraine would be provided a loan in amount of 400 million karbovanets in exchange for food deliveries from its territory. On 18 May the Council of Ministers adopted the law on creation of the State Guard. On 23 May peace negotiations started between representatives of Ukraine and Soviet Russia, and on 28 May a plenipotentiary delegation of the Regional Council of Kuban headed by Mykola Ryabovol arrived to Kyiv with a proposal to unify the region with Ukraine. On 30 May Minister of Foreign Affairs Dmytro Doroshenko petitioned German ambassador in Ukraine baron Alfons Mumm von Schwarzenstein to allow the incorporation of Crimea into Ukraine. That proposal was supported by the Congress of Landowners and Agrarians of Taurida Governorate, which convened in Simferopol on 12 June.

Seal of the Ukrainian State (Hetmanate)

On 20 June the All-Ukrainian Church Council took place in Kyiv. As part of the council, on 10 July Orthodox clergy lifted the anathema on Hetman Mazepa. On 1 July the Hetmanate's government adopted the decision on the creation of a Ukrainian university in Kamianets-Podilsky. On 2 July the law on citizenship of the Ukrainian State was adopted, and on 8 July creation of the State Senate of the Ukrainian State as the supreme judicial institution was decreed. On 9 July the government created a commission tasked with establishing the Ukrainian Academy of Sciences. On 2 August the law on creation of the National Library of Ukrainian State was adopted. On 6 August the All-Ukrainian Church Council called for the autocephaly of the Ukrainian Church. On 6 October the Kyiv State Ukrainian University was opened.

On 24 July Ukraine and Germany ratified the Brest Peace Treaty. On the same day laws on general conscription, criminal responsibility for exceeding the maximum established prices and speculation, and regulation of appointments for government service were adopted by the government. On 27 July, due to the anti-Ukrainian policies of the Crimean Regional Government the Ukrainian State established an economic blockade of the peninsula, which lasted until 18 September. On 1 August laws on supreme authority and political role of military servicemen were approved. On 10 August the government confirmed the statute of the Ukrainian State Bank and its base and reserve capitals, and on 17 August a law on restriction of imports of Russian monetary units was promulgated. On 22 August in Vienna Turkish and Ukrainian delegations exchanged documents on the ratification of Brest Peace Treaty. On 10 September an economic agreement for the fiscal years of 1918 and 1919 was signed between Ukraine, Germany and Austria-Hungary.

On 5 October negotiations started in Kyiv between Ukraine and Crimea concerning the conditions of the peninsula's accession to Ukraine. On 16 October the hetman issued a declaration on the revival of Cossack formations, and on 17 October his government adopted a declaration on the organization of volunteer militias with the purpose of upholding law and order. On 21 October the hetman met with the extraordinary mission of the Kuban regional government headed by Colonel V. Tkachov. On 6 November German authorities transferred the ships of the Black Sea fleet to the Ukrainian State. On 13–16 November on trade, consular services, naval, railway and financial connections was signed between the government of Ukraine and the Kuban regional government. On 26 November the Ukrainian Academy of Sciences was established under the chairmanship of Vladimir Vernadsky. On 5 December an agreement on cooperation was signed between Ukraine and Georgia.

=== Restoration of the Republic ===
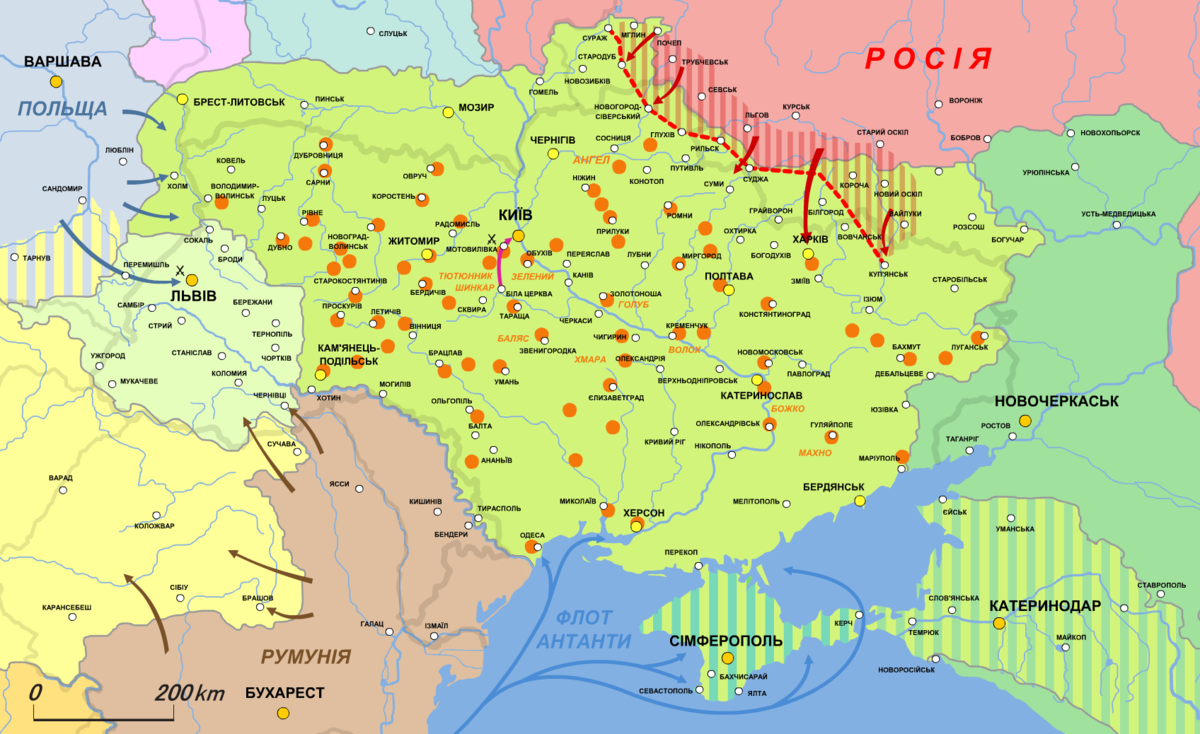
Major locations of the Anti-Hetman Uprising, showing the simultaneous Bolshevik invasion in the north and Ukrainian-Polish War in the west

Immediately after the coup of 29 April oppositional parties started uniting their forces against the hetman's regime. In May the Ukrainian National State Union was established by several political groups and civic organizations; in July the alliance changed its name to Ukrainian National Union and accepted in its rows the Ukrainian Social Democratic Labour Party and Peasant Spilka, simultaneously excluding the Democratic Agrarian Party. On 18 September the union was headed by Volodymyr Vynnychenko. Another opposition group was the Ukrainian Zemstvo Union headed by Symon Petliura.

The Hetmanate's government supported the confiscation of previously nationalized peasant lands by wealthy estate owners, often with the help of German troops. This led to unrest, the rise of peasant guerrilla movement, and a series of large-scale popular armed revolts. Negotiations were held to garner support from previous Rada members Petliura and Vynnychenko, but those worked to overthrow Skoropadsky. On 30 July, a Russian Left Socialist-Revolutionary, Boris Mikhailovich Donskoy, with help from the local USRP succeeded in assassinating von Eichhorn, blowing him up in broadlight in downtown Kyiv.

Due to the impending loss of World War I by Germany and Austria-Hungary, who were Skoropadsky's main sponsors, part of the hetman's ministers adopted a pro-Entente position and voiced support for the restoration of "one indivisible Russia". In order to distance himself from that proposal, Skoropadsky initiated talks with Vynnychenko, which resulted in appointment of four government members representing the Ukrainian Party of Socialist Federalists, part of the Ukrainian National Union. In his declaration from 29 October, the hetman pledged his allegiance to a sovereign Ukraine and promised to introduce a land reform and call a parliament. The new ministers started working on laws in order to realize the program. At the same time, the degradation of situation in Germany threatened with a new Bolshevik invasion, and Kyiv became a centre of concentration of Russian officers and politicians. This moved the hetman to adopt a more conciliatory position to the Entente, whose representatives viewed Ukrainian national aspirations with skepticism, but supported the unification of all anti-Communist forces.

On 13 November the Soviets annulled the Brest Peace Treaty and invalidated their recognition of the Ukrainian State's independence. On 14 November 1918 Skoropadsky issued a declaration, proclaiming the course on federation with non-Bolshevik Russia. Simultaneously, the hetman formed a new cabinet composed of Russian Monarchists. In response, the Ukrainian National Union announced a new revolutionary government, the Directorate. On 15 November the Directorate's members entered Bila Tserkva, where they were joined by Sich Riflemen headed by colonel Yevhen Konovalets. Thousands of peasants started joining the revolt soon thereafter.

The Directorate gained massive popularity, as well as support of some of Skoropadsky's military units, including the Serdiuk Division. After reaching an agreement with the local German garrison, on 16 November the rebels captured Bila Tserkva, and on the next day took Fastiv, moving in the direction of Kyiv. On 18 November the Directorate's forces defeated hetman's troops commanded by Fyodor Keller near Motovylivka and approached the capital. The insurgent army encircled Kyiv on 21 November. The city was protected by Russian volunteer troops and German forces, but on 12 December the latter agreed to declare neutrality in exchange for being allowed to return home. After a three-week-long stalemate, on 14 December Skoropadsky abdicated in favor of the Council of Ministers and emigrated to Germany. The Council, in its turn, surrendered to the revolutionary forces, with some of its ministers being put under arrest. In most parts of Ukraine, the rebels met only minor resistance of German and Hetmanate troops and swiftly took power. On 19 December 1918, the Directorate took control of the Ukrainian capital and proclaimed restoration of the Ukrainian People's Republic.

=== Establishment of the Directorate ===
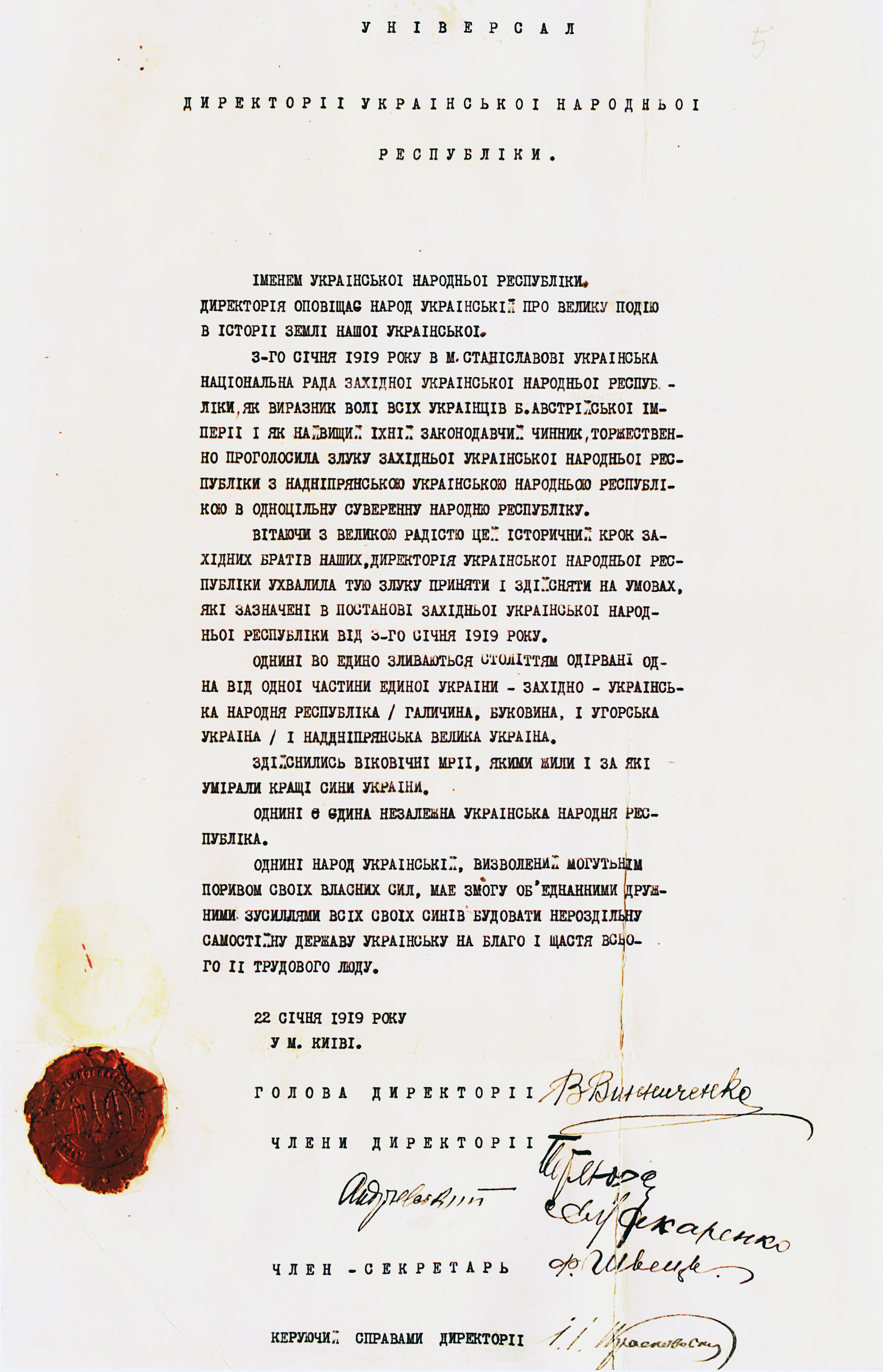
Text of the Unification Act of 22 January 1919

Among the first steps of the Directorate was restoration of the law on national-individual autonomy on 16 December. After its entry into Kyiv on 19 December, its forces conducted a military parade at Sofiyska Square. Meanwhile Entente forces occupied the ports of Southern Ukraine as part of the Allied intervention in the Russian Civil War, which caused a note of protest from the new government. On 26 December the Directorate published a declaration on the principles of its socioeconomic policies and political system. On 1 January 1919 the law on the Supreme body of the Ukrainian Autocephalous Orthodox Unified Church was adopted. On 2 January Chief Otaman Symon Petliura ordered the exile of all "enemies of Ukraine". On 4 January the Directorate adopted the law establishing the Ukrainian monetary unit, hryvnia, and on 8 January the government approved the Land Law, based upon socialist principles.

Following the signing of an agreement between the Ukrainian People's Republic and the newly proclaimed West Ukrainian People's Republic, which was approved by the Ukrainian National Council in Stanislaviv on 4 January 1919, on 22 January the two states officially united, although the latter entity de facto maintained its own army and government. In order to counter the Bolshevik propaganda, the Directorate took a decision to base its policies on the so-called "labour principle", meaning that all power was to belong to councils of Workers, peasants and working intelligentsia. This produced allegations against the Ukrainian national movement, which was depicted by Polish and Russian representatives at the Entente as sympathetic of Bolshevism. On 23 January the Labor Congress of Ukraine was opened in Kyiv. Attended by over 400 delegates, out of which 65 represented Western Ukraine, it expressed its trust in the Directorate and adopted the law on the structure of government in Ukraine. On 28 January the congress officially ratified the Unification Act. On the same day the organ dissolved due to the Bolshevik offensive on Kyiv.

=== New Bolshevik invasion ===
Following the dissolution of Austria-Hungary and revolution in Germany, Central Powers started the evacuation of their troops from Ukraine. After establishing a new Ukrainian Soviet government in Kursk, the Bolsheviks started a new invasion in late December. On 31 December 1918 and 3-4 January 1919 the Directorate issued several notes of protest to Soviet Russia due to its invasion of Ukraine, and on 16 January 1919 Ukraine officially declared war on Russia, while the Russian Soviet government continued to deny all claims of invasion. Except from a small number of regular units of the former Hetmanate, such as the Zaporizhian Corps and the Sich Riflemen, most of Ukrainian troops at the time were represented by undisciplined rebel squads commanded by politically unreliable otamans. Having enthusiastically supported the fight against Skoropadsky's regime, those troops were reluctant to oppose the Bolsheviks and frequently joined their side.

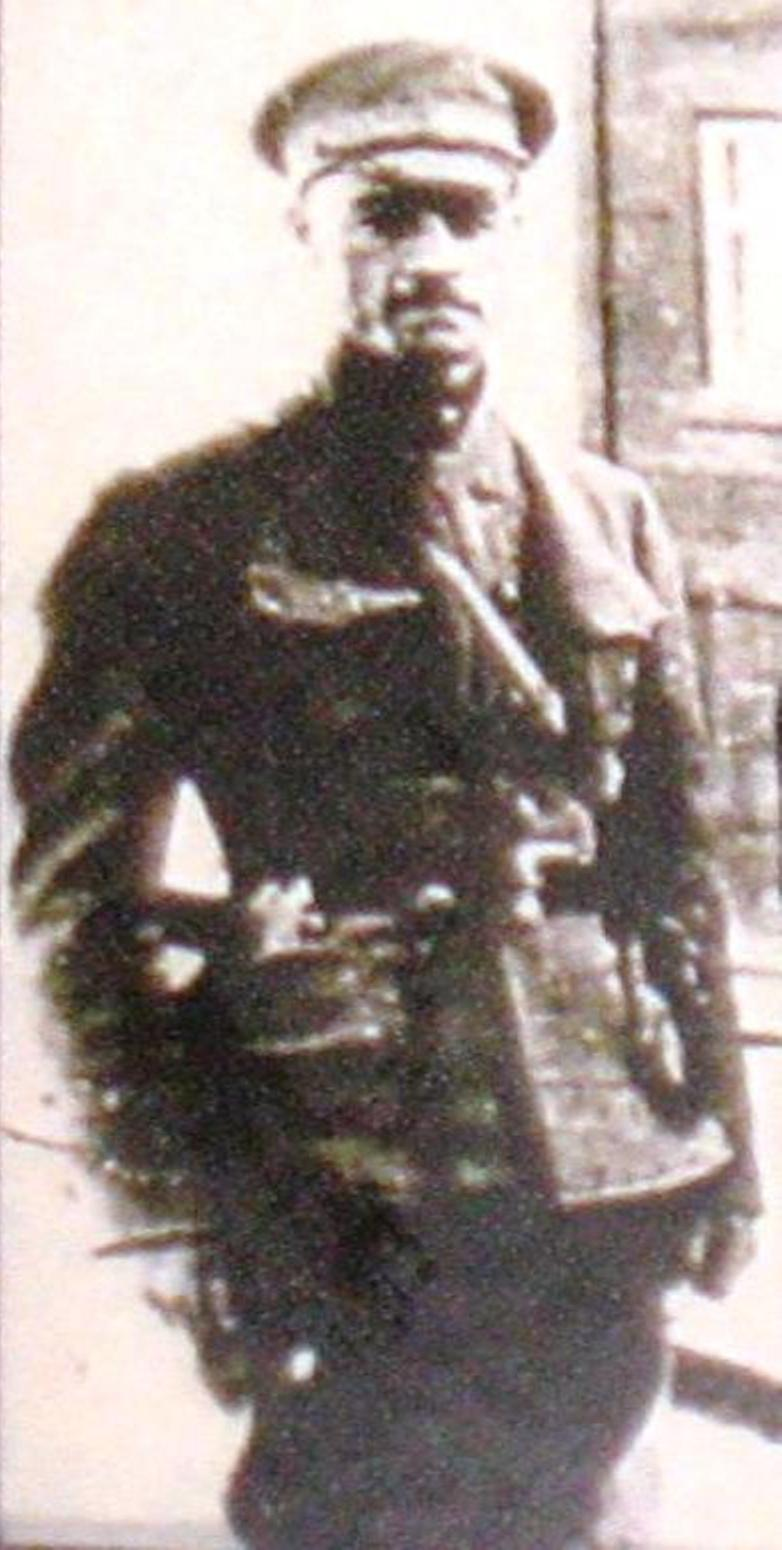
Otaman Hryhoriev, who deserted Directorate forces and joined the Bolsheviks in 1919

In late December 1918, the Bolsheviks directed their main military effort against Left-bank Ukraine. In the north, their forces tied up Ukrainian contingents in Polissia near Mazyr and Luninets. Bolshevik forces were aided by rebel groups headed by Makhno, who occupied Katerynoslav, and Zeleny, whose forces started an insurgency to the south of Kyiv. This allowed the Bolsheviks to occupy the Left Bank and approach the Ukrainian capital. In the south, Entente forces occupied the port of Odesa and forced Ukrainian troops to retreat to the line Tiraspol-Birzula-Voznesensk-Mykolaiv-Kherson, transferring power in the city to Russian Volunteer Army. Protesting against the unwillingness of the Directorate to oppose the Entente demands, parts of its forces headed by otaman Hryhoriev deserted its ranks and joined the Bolsheviks.

On 5 February, the Bolshevik troops captured Kyiv. The Directorate was forced to move to Vinnytsia, where on 13 February the Council of People's Ministers was reshuffled. On 17 February the Directorate petitioned the governments of the Entente and the United States for help in fight with the Bolsheviks. On 27 February the Chief Otaman met with an Entente Commission in Khodoriv. The Bolsheviks, meanwhile, started advancing from the north in order to separate troops of the Ukrainian People's Republic from the Galician Army, and from the southeast, aiming to enter Romania and come to the aid of the Hungarian Soviet Republic.

On 15 March the delegation of Western Ukraine headed by Yevhen Petrushevych met with the Directorate in Proskuriv to further discuss the development of joint military operations. In March, Ukrainian forces engaged in a counteroffensive in the vicinity of Berdychiv, Koziatyn and Zhytomyr, and succeeded in distracting Bolshevik troops from the southern front. On 6 April Hryhoriev's troops forced the Entente contingent to abandon Odessa, which put Ukrainian armies in the south in danger. Following unsanctioned negotiations led by Zaporozhian Corps commander Omelian Volokh with the Bolsheviks, on 16 April the southern group of Ukrainian forces had to retreat across the Dniester, where its fighters were disarmed by Romanian guards and were later transferred to Volhynia, rejoining the fight.

Following unsuccessful negotiations with the Entente, whose French representatives demanded from the Ukrainian side to create a single front with Russian anti-Bolsheviks, on 9 April the Directorate adopted a declaration on the resignation of Ostapenko government and appointed a new Council of People's Ministers headed by Borys Martos. On 15 April the government appointed General Oleksandr Osetsky as the Otaman of the Army. On 29 April Volodymyr Oskilko organized a coup attempt against the Directory in Rivne, which further weakened Ukrainian positions in Volhynia. In early May the government of Ukrainian People's Republic was forced to leave its territory and move to Galicia. On 9 May Symon Petliura was elected head of the Directorate in Radyvyliv.

=== War on two fronts ===
Following the dissolution of Austria-Hungary, Poland annexed the Kholm Governorate and soon occupied southwestern Volhynia, where the power was transferred to Polish national committees. By the end of 1918 Polish troops had occupied Podlachia and Berestia. Further advance of Polish forces was stopped, but the Ukrainian side was unable to force them to retreat across the Buh. On 4 April the plenipotentiary representative of Ukraine at the Versailles Peace Conference H. Sydorenko expressed his protest against the Polish military attack on Ukrainian territory and the political and material support of Poland by the Entente. In early May Polish divisions under command of general Haller started a new advance, and on 15 May occupied Lutsk, threatening the rear of Ukrainian armies fighting against the Bolsheviks. On 20 May peace negotiations between the diplomatic mission of Ukraine and the command of the Polish Army in Lublin ended with no positive results.

Following the Bolshevik occupation of Rivne, Shepetivka, Proskuriv and Kamianets-Podilskyi, in late May 1919 the Ukrainian army found itself encircled from two sides in the area of Dubno and Brody. Further south, the Galician army was defeated by Polish forces and forced to retreat to the confluence of Dniester and Zbruch river. In these circumstances, on 24 May the Ukrainian People's Republic signed an armistice with the Poles and redirected part of its troops against the Bolsheviks. Despite numerical disadvantage, the operation succeeded, and by mid-June Bolshevik armies had to retreat from southwestern Podillia. As a result, the government of UPR was able to establish its new temporary capital in Kamianets-Podilskyi, and the Ukrainian army experienced a new influx of volunteers from liberated territories.

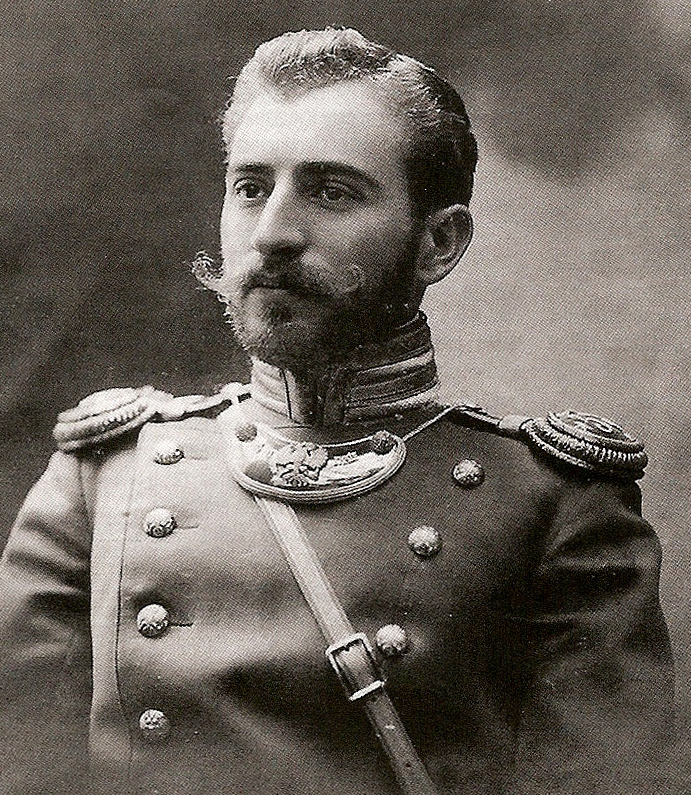
Portrait of colonel Petro Bolbochan, who was involved in a coup attempt against the Directorate in June 1919

On 12 June the government of Finland reestablished its diplomatic relations with Ukraine, and on 16 June Cardinal Secretary of State Pietro Gasparri informed the Chairman of Directorate S. Petliura on the approval of Count Mykhailo Tyshkevych as the Ambassador of Ukraine to the Holy See. On 18 June the delegation of Ukraine at the Versailles Peace Conference together with the representatives of Estonia, Latvia, Belarus, Georgia, Azerbaijan and North Caucasus expressed its protest against the recognition of Admiral Kolchak's government by the Supreme Council of Paris Peace conference. On 20–21 June a temporary agreement was signed between Ukraine and Poland in Lviv, establishing demarcation along the Delwig line.

The initially successful anti-Bolshevik offensive met with difficulties after a new coup attempt in Proskuriv, which was led by Petro Bolbochan with support of Socialist Independists. On 5 July Bolshevik troops managed to reoccupy the city and advance to Kamianets. In this critical moment, Ukrainian troops were supported by the unit of otaman Yuriy Tyutyunnyk, who deserted Hryhoriev's troops and threatened the Bolsheviks' southern flank, as well as by the Galician Army, which crossed the Zbruch on 16-18 July. By 17 July, Bolshevik forces had been repealed to the line Horodok-Yarmolyntsi-Sharhorod-Dunaivtsi-Nova Ushytsia-Vapniarka, and the UPR's government was joined by the government of Western Ukraine in Kamianets.

=== Counteroffensive in the east ===
Ukrainian anti-Bolshevik offensive on Kyiv and Odesa directions, August 1919

Following the Galician Army's retreat across the Zbruch, it united forces with the Directorate, and both armies started a joint offensive against the Bolsheviks, which took place in parallel with Denikin's anti-Bolshevik campaign in the Left-bank Ukraine. To secure its flanks in the west, in late July the Ukrainian side entered armistice negotiations Poland. On 2 August staff of the Ukrainian People's Army adopted a plan of advance on Kyiv and Odesa, with an auxiliary offensive against Korosten. In order to coordinate actions of the two allied armies, on 11 August the Staff of Chief Otaman was created under the command of Mykola Yunakiv and Viktor Kurmanovych. The united Ukrainian forces reached a strength of 85,000 and were aided by 15,000 insurgents in the Bolshevik rear.

After fierce battles, on 12 August Ukrainian troops took Vinnytsia, and on 14 August captured Khmilnyk, Yaniv, Kalynivka and Starokostiantyniv. On 19 August Ukrainian forces established control over Berdychiv, and two days later entered Zhytomyr. In the southeast units commanded by Oleksandr Udovychenko advanced on Birzula. On 31 August Ukrainian armies entered Kyiv and organized a military parade in the city. However, on the same day elements of the 7th Volunteer Army under command of general Bredov infiltrated the city from the Left Bank. Following a skirmish, the Ukrainian command headed by Antin Kravs agreed to retreat from Kyiv in southwestern direction. This allowed parts of the 14th Bolshevik Army to rejoin its main force near Zhytomyr.

The retreat from Kyiv made clear the existence of a serious division in tactical views between the leadership of Ukrainian People's Republic and its Western Ukrainian counterparts. Seeing Poland as their chief enemy, the Galicians considered it possible to establish an alliance with the Russian White Movement, especially if this would provide them aid from the Entente. Meanwhile leaders of the UPR considered the perspective of an agreement with Denikin to be unrealistic due to his hostile anti-Ukrainian position, and would rather cooperate with the Poles. At the same time, the Ukrainian Republic suffered from a blockade imposed by Entente forces, which resulted in lack of ammunition and medicaments. The only channel of trade was established through Romania, which exchanged goods for Ukrainian sugar. In order to reach agreement with the Entente, representative of the Western Ukrainian delegation in Paris proposed to establish ties with Russia, but the UPR government and Directorate opposed that move and promoted independence struggle against both Red and White Russians.

=== War against Denikin ===
Territory under control of Ukrainian forces (yellow) by early autumn 1919

The occupation of large parts of Ukrainian territory by Denikin's White Army was accompanied with the reestablishment of big landownership and repression against Ukrainian cultural life. This resulted in numerous rebellions, which Petliura's command hoped to exploit for its benefit. However, the government of Western Ukraine was reluctant to condemn the White movement, hoping to reach an agreement with the help of Entente. In September Denikin's troops started an offensive against the Ukrainian-held territory, forcing the Ukrainian armies to retreat towards Koziatyn, Berdychiv and Zhytomyr. On 24 September Western Ukrainian dictator Yevhen Petrushevych finally agreed to appeal to the Ukrainian nation on the issue of fight against the White Army.

The advent of cold weather caused new difficulties, bringing with itself a typhus epidemic, which greatly damaged both the civilian population and the army personnel. The epidemic was exacerbated by the lack of medicaments caused by the continuing blockade of the Ukrainian territory. Having lost up to 70% of their fighters, Ukrainian armies were forced to retreat westwards. To save their human resources, on 6 November command of the Galician Army signed an agreement with Denikin, according to which their force would become part of the Armed Forces of South Russia. This step was condemned by Petrushevych, who initiated a court proceeding against the signatories. However, the court acquitted Galician Army's supreme commander Myron Tarnavsky and his chief of staff, and on 17 November the treaty was confirmed in Odesa. On 16 November Petrushevych left for Vienna, hoping to protect the interests of Galician Ukrainians with diplomatic means.

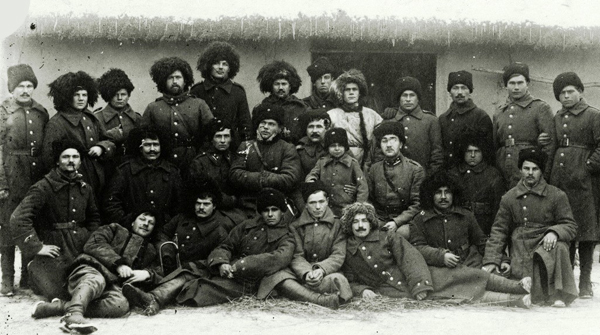
Ukrainian officers participating in the First Winter Campaign

Following the liquidation of Galician Army's front, the Directorate was forced to leave Kamianets and moved nothwards together with the retreating army. On 15 November its members agreed to transfer all of the organ's functions to Petliura. By the end of November, Directorate's forces found themselves surrounded by Poles from the west, Denikin's forces from the east and south, and Bolsheviks from the north. On 4 December a joint council of government members and army command of the UPR took a decision to engage in guerrilla war in the rear of Bolsheviks and Denikin's troops, and on 6 December a group under command of Mykhailo Omelianovych-Pavlenko and Yuriy Tyutyunnyk moved northeast, starting the First Winter Campaign. Petliura left for Warsaw in order to engage in diplomatic work, leaving prime minister Isaak Mazepa and other members of government to coordinate the army.

Following an advance of Bolshevik troops in Left-bank Ukraine and Volhynia, Denikin's armies were forced to retreat southwards, and most of Ukraine was once again occupied by the Red Army. In early December the Bolsheviks once again took Kyiv, and by early 1920 controlled most of the Ukrainian territory except of Volhynia and western Podillia, which were occupied by Poland.

=== Alliance with Poland ===
In October 1919 a diplomatic mission headed by Andriy Livytskyi and involving Stepan Vytvytskyi arrived to Poland in order to negotiate provision of supplies for Ukrainian troops. On 2 December it presented a declaration, which agreed to establish the Polish-Ukrainian border along the Zbruch river and across southwestern Volhynia. The declaration caused a protest by Galician deputies and resulted in their exit from the mission. Simultaneously, Polish authorities interned Ukrainian troops and helped landowners to impose contributions for partitioned land from peasants in territories under their control. This forced Petliura and Livytskyi to issue an appeal on the name of Polish leader Józef Piłsudski. Preparing for a war against Soviet Russia, in January 1920 Polish government agreed to allow the establishment of two Ukrainian units: 6th Rifle Division under command of Marko Bezruchko and 2nd Iron Division headed by Oleksandr Udovychenko, which were subordinated to 3rd and 6th Polish armies respectively.

In late December, Ukrainian troops acting in the enemy rear during the First Winter Campaign established contact with Galician troops, but soldiers of the latter were weakened by typhus and unable to join them. At first, the Ukrainian partisans operated between the lines of Red and White troops, but following the Bolshevik advance ended up in the rear of the Red Army. After continuing operations in the areas of Yelysavethrad, Olhopil and Znamianka, as well as crossing the Dnieper near Zolotonosha, in late March they were ordered by Petliura to move in western direction, breaking through the Polish-Bolshevik front. On 6 May 1920 the Ukrainian force exited the Bolshevik-held territory near Yampil.

In face of the Bolshevik advance, on 19 November parts of the Galician Army evacuated their combat-ready soldiers from the area of Vinnytsia towards Odesa. In order to prevent hostile actions by the Bolsheviks, elements of the army established their own Revolutionary Committee (Revkom). After Romania refused to allow the army's personnel to cross the Dniester, on 12 January 1920 the Revkom signed an agreement with the Bolshevik 12th Army, according to which the Ukrainian Galician Army would join the Red Army under the name of Red UGA. After the arrest of its leaders by the Bolsheviks and numerous cases of terror against its members, in April 1920 several units of the Galician Army deserted to the ranks of Ukrainian People's Army, but were soon disarmed and interned by UPR's Polish allies.

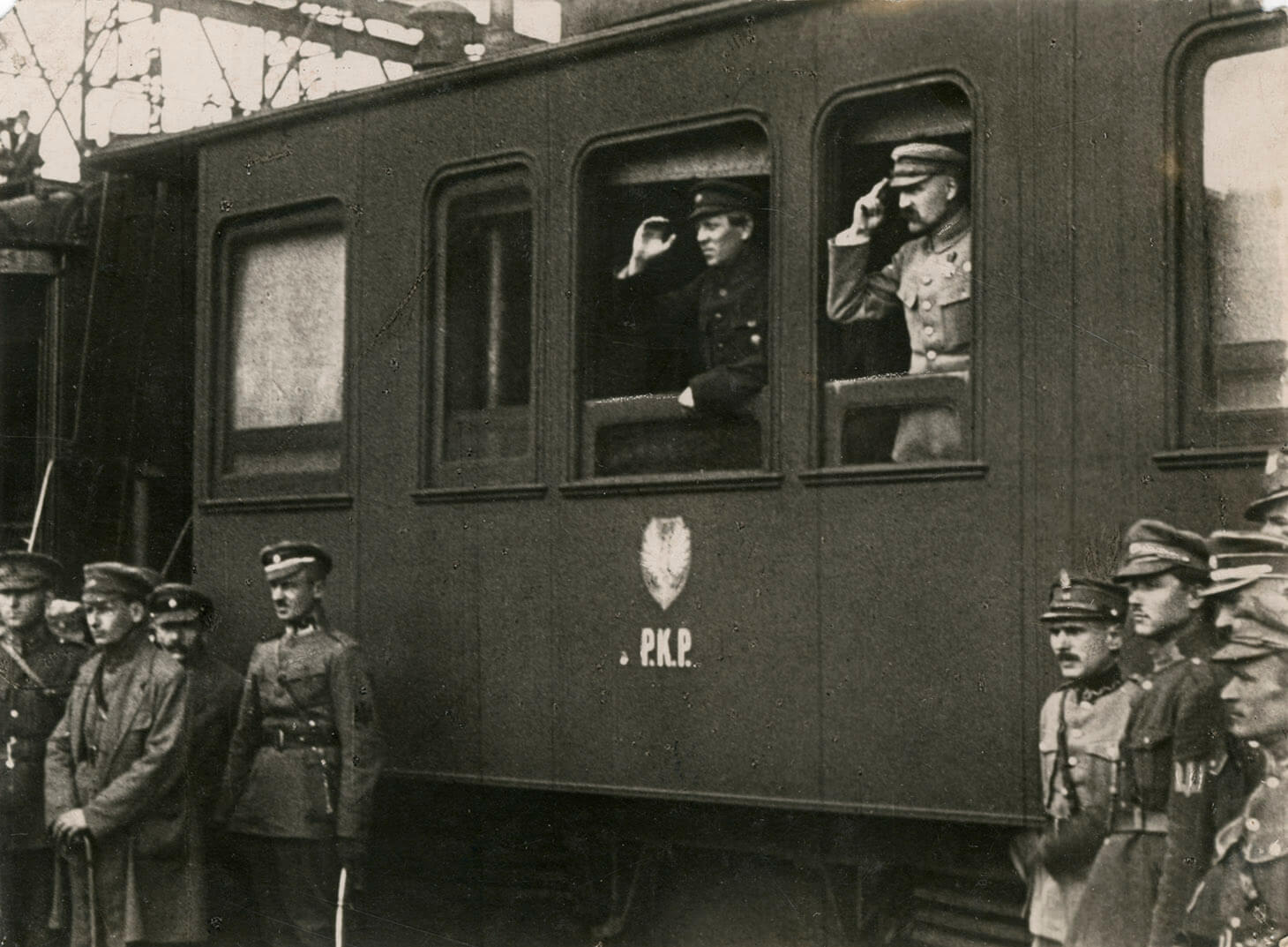
Symon Petliura (left) and Józef Piłsudski arriving to Vinnytsia in 1920

In order to prevent the internment of Ukrainian troops returning from the First Winter campaign and viewing alliance with Poland as a chance to establish ties with the Entente, on 22 April 1920 Ukrainian representative Andriy Livytskyi signed the Treaty of Warsaw, according to which the Polish side recognized Ukrainian People's Republic as an independent state with Petliura as its head. The treaty established the Polish-Ukrainian border along the Zbruch and further north through Vyshhorodok, Kremenets Mountains, following the line east of Zdolbuniv and along the eastern borders of Rivne county and Minsk Governorate to Prypiat. According to the treaty, Poland recognized all lands east of that line and up to the 1772 eastern border of the Polish-Lithuanian Commonwealth to be part of Ukraine, but the exact location of Ukrainian-Russian border was not concerned. The Polish government also pledged not to sign any international agreements directed against Ukraine. National-cultural rights of representatives of both title ethnicities in each of the countries were guaranteed, and Ukraine was obliged to provide special treatment to ethnic Polish landowners in its territory. A Polish-Ukrainian military convention signed at the same time provided Poland significant influence over Ukraine's military, finances, administration and railways.

The signing of the Treaty of Warsaw caused protests from the government of the West Ukrainian People's Republic in exile, and condemnations were issued by prominent Ukrainian figures including Mykhailo Hrushevsky, Volodymyr Vynnychenko, Mykola Shapoval and Semen Vityk. The treaty's adoption resulted in the resignation of Isaak Mazepa's cabinet and its replacement by the government of Viacheslav Prokopovych.

On 25 April 1920 Polish troops supported by two Ukrainian divisions and the army returning from the First Winter Campaign started its offensive on Kyiv. On 27 April Udovychenko's division took Mohyliv-Podilskyi, and on 7 May the unit of Bezruchko entered Kyiv as part of the Polish army. However, on 5 June the Bolshevik 1st Cavalry Army broke through the front near Koziatyn and forced Polish-Ukrainian troops to retreat. On 13 July Ukrainian forces retreated westwards across the Zbruch, and on 10 August Udovychenko's unit moved across the Dniester. On 29-30 August Bezruchko's division took part in the defense of Zamość against the Bolsheviks, which contributed to the eventual defeat of the Red Army at Warsaw. After the beginning of Bolshevik retreat, on 15 September Ukrainian forces crossed the Dniester and defeated the Bolshevik 14th Army, occupying the left bank of the Zbruch. One month later, Ukrainian units reached the line Yaruha-Sharhorod-Bar-Lityn.

On 18 October, contrary to its pledge to the Ukrainian side, Poland agreed an armistice with Bolshevik troops, leaving the Ukrainian left flank vulnerable to enemy attacks. During that time, the Ukrainian force counted 23,000 soldiers and was aided by a 5,000-strong squad composed of Russians and Cossacks formed by Boris Savinkov's Russian Political Committee. These forces were significantly inferior to the Red Army, which was temporarily distracted by the actions of Pyotr Wrangel's Voluteer Army in Crimea. Nevertheless, the Ukrainian command decided to initiate a general offensive, which was planned to commence on 11 November. However, on 10 November the Bolsheviks struck first and defeated the southern flank of Ukrainian forces. As a result, on 21 November 1920 the Ukrainian army was forced to retreat across the Zbruch, where its soldiers were interned by the Poles.

=== Guerrilla war ===
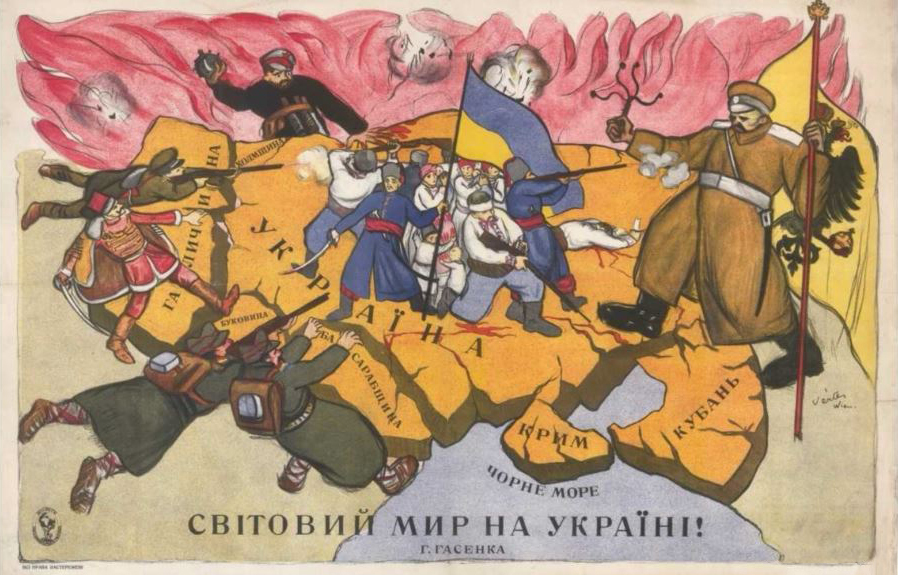
"World peace in Ukraine!", a 1919 caricature by Yuri Hasenko

Starting from 1919, Ukraine experienced chaos as the armies of the Ukrainian Republic, the Bolsheviks, the Whites, powers of the Entente and Poland, as well as anarchist forces such as Nestor Makhno's Revolutionary Insurgent Army of Ukraine fought for control over the country. Numerous uprisings took place during that time, some of them being directed against Petliura's government, while others opposed the Soviet regime or Entente forces.

According to Cheka documentation, between 1917 and 1932, Ukraine was the site of 268 uprisings in over 100 raions, with mutinying peasants killing chekists, Communists, and prodotryad members who were requisitioning food by force and engaged in expropriation. Among the largest anti-Bolshevik rebellions in Ukraine during the existence of the Ukrainian People's Republic were the Makhnovshchina, Hryhoriv Uprising, the actions of Otaman Zelenyi, Kholodnyi Yar partisans and Free Cossacks led by Semen Hryzlo, as well as the uprisings in Zazymia, directed against Cheka and the Bashkir Cavalry Brigade. In 1920 an ambush was organized against Red Army troops near Uman.

Following the retreat of regular Ukrainian forces, a special headquarters tasked with coordinating anti-Bolshevik insurgent activities in Ukraine was established in Poland under command of Yuriy Tyutyunnyk. By late 1920 the forces of Ukrainian partisans numbered up to 40,000 fighters. Rebel groups were most active in the areas of Lityn, Radomyshl, Cherkasy, Zvenyhorodka, Katerynoslav and Poltava. Some of the squads continued their activities until 1923-1924. On 12 November 1920, shortly before its retreat from Ukrainian territory, the Directorate adopted a law on the Temporary Supreme Authority of Ukraine. On 3 February 1921 in Tarnów the Council of the Ukrainian Republic, consisting from representatives of major Ukrainian parties, adopted a declaration to the Ukrainian people, which presented the social and economic program of the Ukrainian People's Republic and warned against unorganized revolts. On 18 March 1921, the Polish government signed the Peace of Riga, recognizing the Ukrainian Soviet Socialist Republic and confirming the incorporation of Kholm, Podlachia, West Volyn and Western Polissia. As a result of the treaty, in summer 1921 the Council of the Republic was forced to cease its activities.

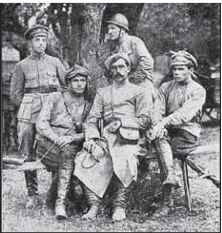
Members of one of the Ukrainian partisan squads in 1921

After its military and political defeat, the Directorate continued to maintain contacts with insurgent groups in Ukrainian territory and tasked Yuriy Tyutyunnyk with preparing a revolt with the aim of overthrowing the Bolshevik government. Preempting a planned invasion by its rival Archduke Wilhelm of Austria, in October 1921 the Ukrainian National Republic's government-in-exile launched a series of guerrilla raids into central Ukraine, that reached up to the outskirts of Kyiv in the east. On 4 November, the Directorate's guerrillas captured Korosten and seized large amounts of military supplies. However, on 17 November 1921 their force was surrounded by Bolshevik cavalry and destroyed. Part of the Ukrainian forces managed to escape to Polish territory and was interned, but 359 fighters were captured by the Bolsheviks and shot on 21 November near Bazar.

== Exile ==
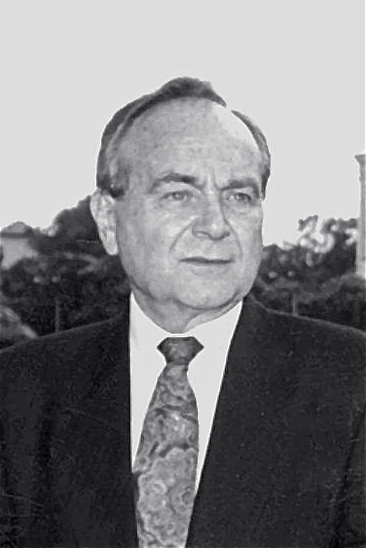
Mykola Plaviuk, the last President of the Ukrainian People's Republic in exile

Following the Treaty of Riga, the Ukrainian government in exile was forced to cease the activities of its diplomatic missions. Due to the hostile policies of the National Democrat Polish government, in 1924 Chief Otaman Petliura had to leave Warsaw, and in 1925 settled in Paris, where he was assassinated next year by suspected Bolshevik agent Sholem Schwarzbard.

According to a law adopted in 1920, Petliura was succeeded by head of government Andriy Livytskyi. Members of the new cabinet headed by Vyacheslav Prokopovych resided in Warsaw, Paris and Prague. Its members were active in the sphere of military training, which was overseen by Volodymyr Salsky, engaged in diplomatic affairs and supported Ukrainian emigrants. Ukrainian representative at the League of Nations Oleksander Shulhyn issued numerous protests against the occupation of Ukraine. Representatives of the Ukrainian government in exile also worked to establish ties with representatives of fellow peoples subjugated by Soviet Russia.

During later periods the government of Ukrainian People's Republic in exile operated in Weimar, Kissingen, Munich, and Philadelphia.

After the beginning of World War II, Taras Bulba-Borovets, with the support of the President of the Ukrainian People's Republic in exile Andriy Livytskyi, crossed the German-Soviet border and started organizing military units of the Ukrainian Insurgent Army subordinate to the UPR Government.

In 1991 the 10th Emergency Session of the Ukrainian National Council recognized the state of Ukraine as the successor of the Ukrainian People's Republic in exile and agreed to transfer the powers and attributes of state power to the newly elected President of Ukraine. In 1992 a session of the Ukrainian National Council took a decision to cease the activities of UPR's emigré institutions, and in August of the same year Mykola Plaviuk, last President of the Ukrainian People's Republic in exile, transferred his symbols of power to Ukrainian president Leonid Kravchuk.

== International relations ==
Starting from Summer 1917, official representatives of France, United Kingdom, United States and Romania, as well as head of the Czechoslovak National Council Tomáš Garrigue Masaryk, visited Kyiv. In August 1917 Oleksander Shulhyn had an audience with Joseph Noulens, the French ambassador in Petrograd. Later in the year, head of the French military mission in Russia visited Kyiv and left one of his staff members as a constant representative in the Ukrainian capital. In order to stop the advance of Central Powers, French and British representatives offered to organize financial and technical aid to Ukraine, but the Ukrainian government demanded their governments to recognize Ukrainian statehood in exchange.

After Bolshevik representatives arrived to Brest for peace talks with the Central Powers, Ukrainian government decided to send their own delegation to the negotiations, and on 24 December 1917 issued an appeal to all sides of the war, calling them to establish peace "without annexations and contributions". The note represented Ukraine as an independent subject of international politics, which caused a negative reaction from the Entente. However, after negotiations France agreed with the Ukrainian representative travelling to Brest, and on 5 January 1918 French foreign minister Stephen Pichon declared the establishment of diplomatic relations with Ukraine in a speech before the French Parliament. On the same day, the French plenipotentiary was accepted by the Ukrainian government. Great Britain also appointed its own representative in Ukraine, and according to an agreement with Masaryk, the Ukrainian side would provide ammunition to the Czechoslovak Legion.

The Ukrainian People's Republic was recognized de jure in February 1918 by the Central Powers of World War I (Austria-Hungary, Germany, the Ottoman Empire and Bulgaria) and by Bolshevik Russia, the Baltic States (Estonia, Latvia and Lithuania), Georgia, Azerbaijan, Romania, Czechoslovakia, the Holy See, the Mountainous Republic of the Northern Caucasus, Armenia, and Kuban (the latter of which sought unification with it). De facto recognition was granted by Switzerland, Sweden, Denmark, and Persia. Partial de facto recognition was received from the Belarusian Democratic Republic (see Belarus–Ukraine relations).

Later in 1918 Russia chose to withdraw its recognition of independent Ukraine, representing the protocols of the Versailles Treaty as justification for its action. In 1920 Symon Petliura and Józef Piłsudski signed the Warsaw Treaty in which both countries established their borders along the Zbruch River.

Due to the lack of sufficient control from the Directorate, corruption became a major issue for Ukrainian diplomacy. Numerous cases of financial fraud and embezzlement took place during the purchase of foreign weapons, ammunition, equipment and medicine for Ukrainian troops. Investigations against Ukrainian diplomatic representatives were started in Germany, Italy and Austria. In some cases, the Directorate took the side of the accused, while in others it requested the help of local police authorities and sent own representatives in order to investigate the allegations. In January 1920, the financing of Ukraine's foreign representatives was disrupted following a decree by Directorate member Andriy Makarenko, who accused the head of Ukrainian financial agency in Berlin of insubordnation.

Following its defeat in the Ukrainian War of Independence, states that had previously recognized the Ukrainian People's Republic ceased any relationships with its Government-in-exile after they recognized the Soviet Government in Kyiv.

Proposed borders presented by the Ukrainian delegation at the Paris Conference

=== Important diplomatic missions ===
- Treaty of Brest-Litovsk, 9 February 1918 (Central Powers, ratified by Germany and Turkey)
- Preliminary peace treaty with Soviet Russia, 12 June 1918 (renounced on 13 November 1918)
- Peace treaty with Don Republic, 8 August 1918
- Unification Act, 22 January 1919, with the Hutsul Republic announcing its intention to join as well
- Participation at the Paris Peace Conference, 1919
- The Eastern Galician mandate of the Jules Cambon Commission was approved by the Entente leaders for handing over to Poland, 21 November 1919
- Treaty of Warsaw (1920)

=== Ukrainian diplomatic representatives ===
- Vienna - Viacheslav Lypynsky
- Sofia - Oleksander Shulhyn
- Bern - Yevmen Lukasevych, Mykola Vasylko
- Berlin - Mykola Porsh, Roman Smal-Stotsky
- Constantinople - Oleksander Lototsky
- Bucharest - Kostiantyn Matsiyevych
- Finland - Mykola Zalizniak
- Scandinavian countries - Kostiantyn Loskyi
- Budapest - Mykola Galagan
- Italy - Dmytro Antonovych
- England - Mykola Stakhovsky, Arnold Margolin, Yaroslav Olesnytskyi
- Czechoslovakia - Maksym Slavynskyi
- Denmark - Dmytro Levytsky
- Belgium and Netherlands - Andriy Yakovliv
- Greece - Fedir Matushevskyi, Modest Levytskyi
- Vatican - Mykhailo Tyshkevych
- Estonia - Y. Holytsynskyi
- Latvia - Volodymyr Kedrowsky
- Paris Peace Conference - Hryhoriy Sydorenko (1919), Mykhailo Tyshkevych (1919-1921)
  - Representatives of Western Ukraine - Vasyl Paneiko, Stepan Tomashivskyi
- Extraordinary mission to France - Oleksander Shulhyn

In addition to the abovementioned countries, in February 1921 the Ukrainian People's Republic was recognized by Argentina. Special missions on prisoners of war were established at the Ukrainian embassies in Berlin, Vienna and Rome.

== Demographics ==
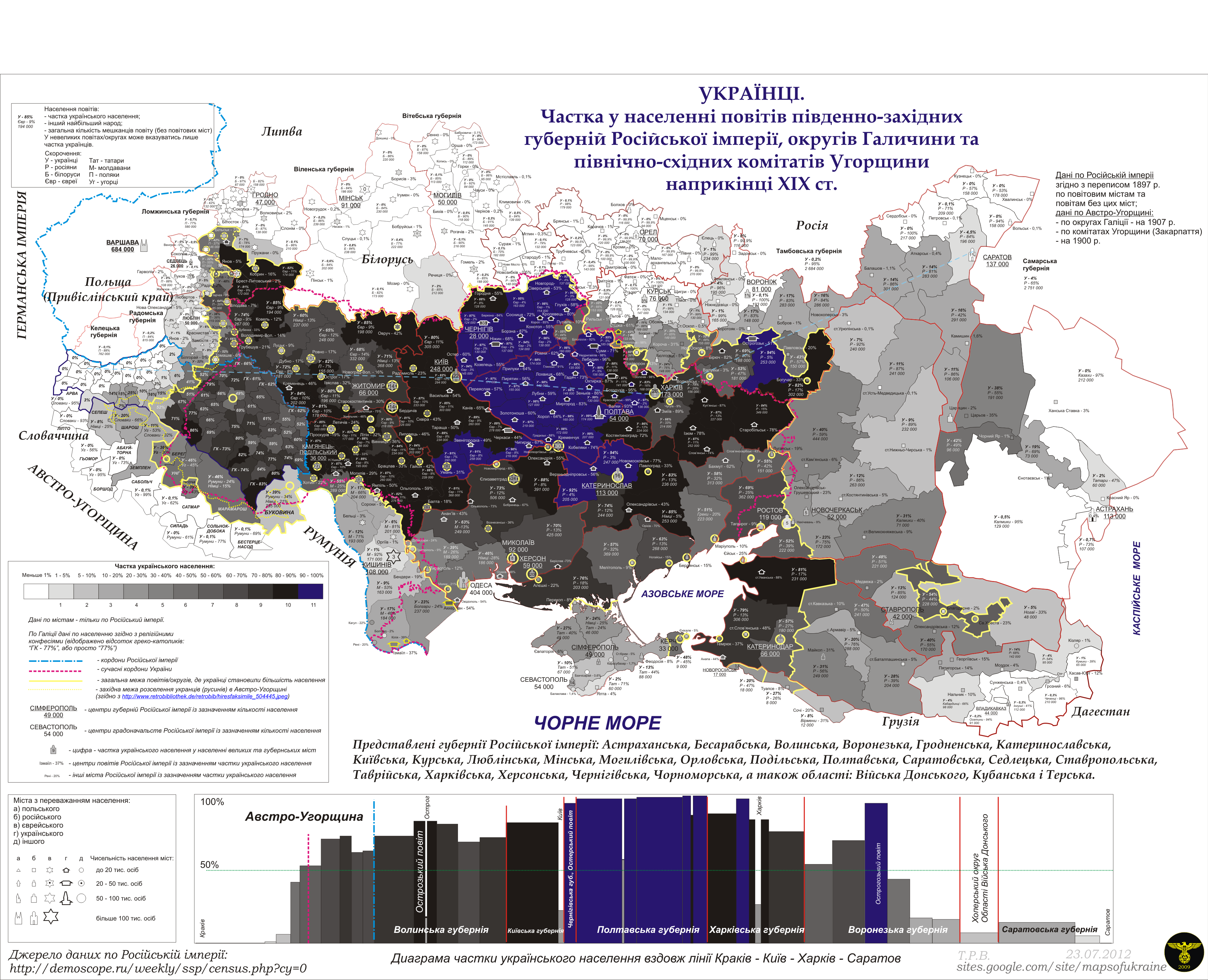
Percentage of Ukrainians in uezds of the southwestern part of Russian Empire, as well as in districts of Galicia, Bukovyna and comitats of northeastern Hungary around 1897-1900

According to the latest census that was taken 1897, the republic was accounted for over 20 million population in seven former Russian guberniyas, plus three uyezds of the Taurida Governorate that were located on the mainland.

National composition (thousands)

- Ukrainians – 14,931.5 (73%)
- Russians – 2,146.1 (11%)
- Jewish – 1,871.8 (9%)
- Germans – 451.3 (2%)
- Poles – 375.9 (2%)
- Belarusians – 208.5 (1%)
- Romanians – 185.7 (1%)
- Other – 1%

=== Fate of Jews ===
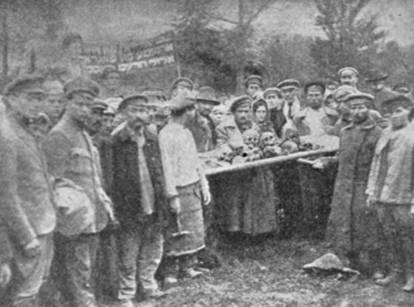
Victims of a pogrom in Fastiv, 1919

During the wars led by the Ukrainian People's Republic between 1917-1921, an estimated 60 thousands of Jews were killed, and many tens of thousands wounded during a series of pogroms perpetrated by different sides of the conflict. Most of such crimes took place in Right-bank Ukraine, which had a particularly numerous Jewish population. According to Nahum Gergel, over 1,000 pogroms were perpetrated during that period, with most of the violence taking place during 1919. Among the first crimes against the Jewish population registered in the territory of Ukrainian People's Republic were the Bolshevik attacks against Jews in Hlukhiv and Novhorod-Siverskyi in early 1918. Due to the lack of control by the command over some units of the Ukrainian People's Army, its soldiers also participated in pogroms, the biggest of which took place in February 1919 in Berdychiv, Proskuriv and Zhytomyr. Ukrainian officers participating in those crimes, such as Ivan Semesenko, disobeyed the orders of Chief Otaman Symon Petliura. Many pogroms were also perpetrated by independent otamans, most notably Hryhoriiv and Zelenyi. An especially large number of pogroms was perpetrated by troops of Denikin's Volunteer Army, many of whom supported the Black Hundreds ideology. In September 1919, 1500 Jews were murdered by Denikin's troops in Fastiv.

== Administrative division ==
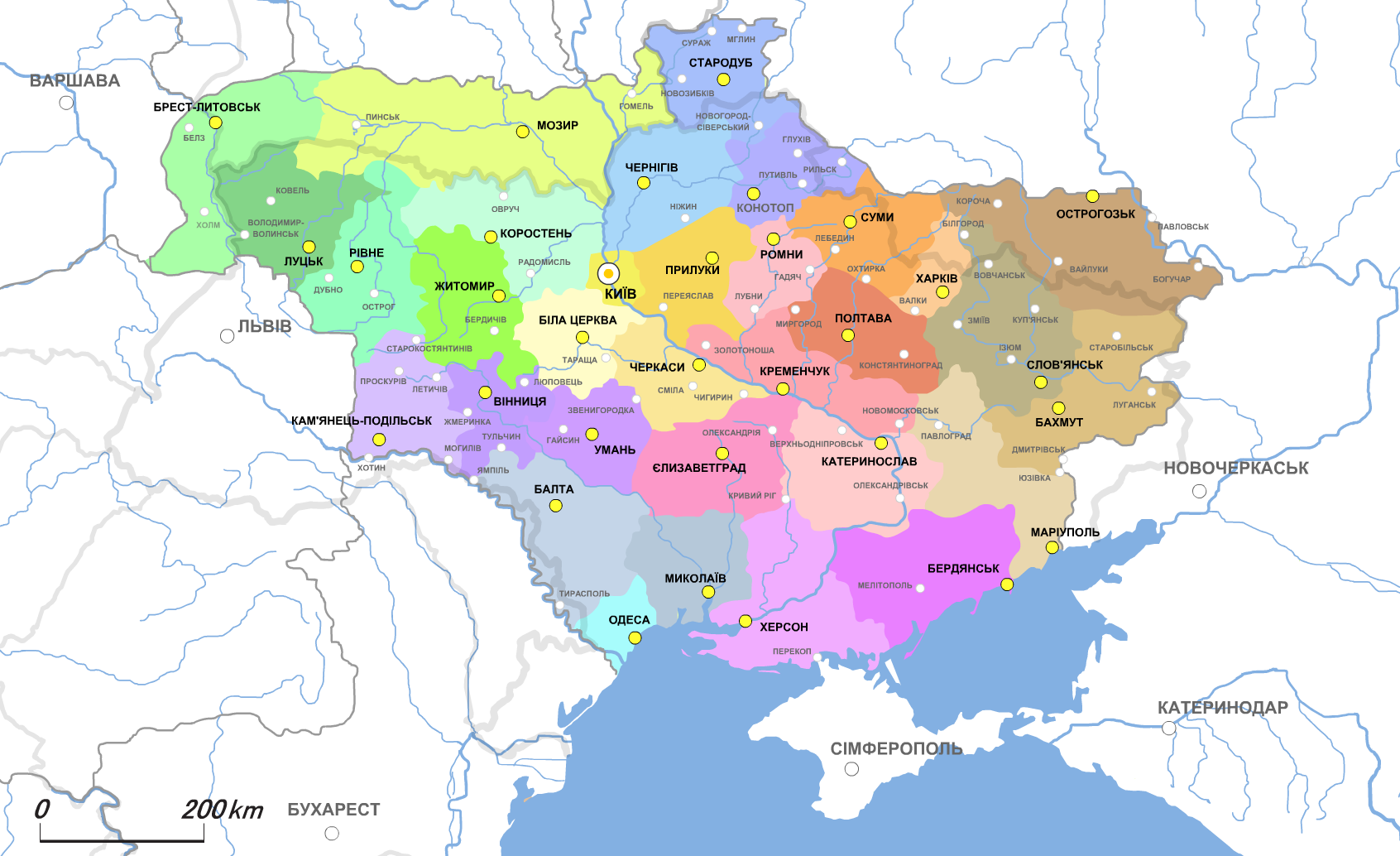
Administrative divisions of the Ukrainian People's Republic according to a project adopted in March 1918

On 4 March 1918 the Ukrainian government accepted the law about the administrative-territorial division of Ukraine. The law stated that Ukraine is divided into 32 zemlia (land) which are administered by their respective zemstvo. This law was not fully implemented as on 29 April 1918 there was the anti-socialist coup in Kiev, after which Hetman Pavlo Skoropadsky reverted the reforms back to the guberniya-type administration.

In the West Ukrainian People's Republic the previous administrative division remained in place.

== Armed forces ==
=== Ukrainization of Russian army units ===
From the very beginning of the revolution, Central Rada and military organizations supported the Ukrainization of army units with an ethnic Ukrainian majority. However, that process was opposed and sabotaged by the Provisional Government and Russian army command, and met additional difficulties due to the dispersion of units across various fronts. However, after it became clear that Ukrainized military units had better military discipline and were more resistant to Bolshevik propaganda, Russian command changed its point of view. Still, from around 4 million Ukrainians who served in the Russian army as of 1917, only 1.5 million represented separate Ukrainian units. The first big military unit to undergo Ukrainization was the 34th Corps under command of general Pavlo Skoropadsky, which was stationed on the Southwestern Front. In August 1917 the unit became officially known as the 1st Ukrainian Corps, incorporating numerous volunteers and Free Cossacks.

=== Organization of a separate armed force ===
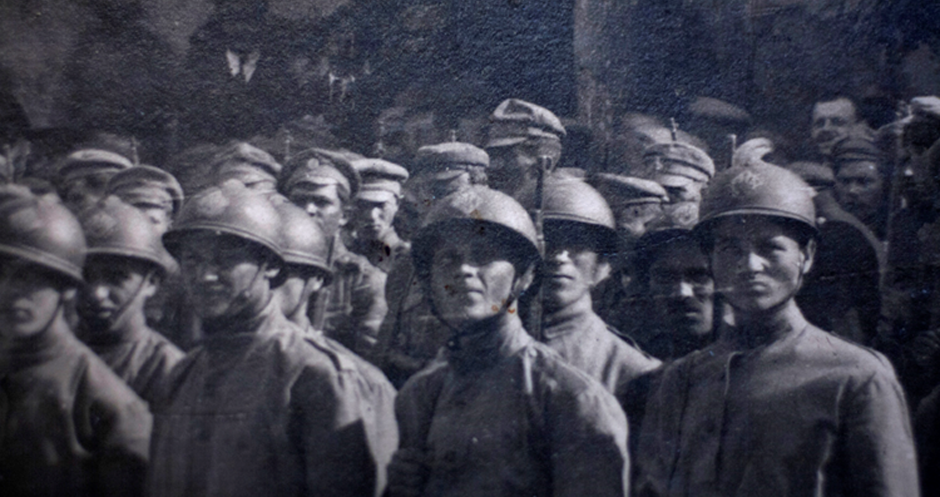
Cadets of the Ukrainian People's Republic during a parade in Kamianets-Podilskyi, 1919

Despite the success of Ukrainization, Bolshevik agitation among soldiers still remained efficient, and many units eventually started deserting from the front. Russian command ignored events in the rear and refused to support Ukrainians against the Bolsheviks, and even most Ukrainized units tended to keep neutrality during the conflict. After the resignation of Petliura from the General Secretariat in December 1917, the Central Rada refused to support the creation of a regular army and perform mobilization, insteding deciding on the creation of voluntary militia units.

An example of such militias were the Free Cossacks, whose units started forming spontaneously in villages of Right-bank Ukraine in order to fight against bands of military deserters. The Free Cossack movement soon spread to Volhynia, Kherson Governorate and Left-bank Ukraine, and also involved groups of workers. A congress of Free Cossacks, which was organized on 16-20 October 1917 in Chyhyryn, established the General Council of Free Cossacks subordinated to the General Secretariat.

Other notable volnteer units which formed in December 1917 and January 1918 were the Haidamak Kish of Sloboda Ukraine commanded by Symon Petliura; the Auxiliary Student Kurin, which fought at the Battle of Kruty; and the Galician Kurin of Sich Riflemen, created from former Ukrainian prisoners of the Austro-Hungarian Army.

=== Command ===
The headquarters of the republic's armed forces was called the General Bulava and had its official location in Kyiv. Due to invasions by Bolsheviks and the German Empire, its physical location frequently changed and included Kamyanets-Podilsky, Bila Tserkva and other cities.

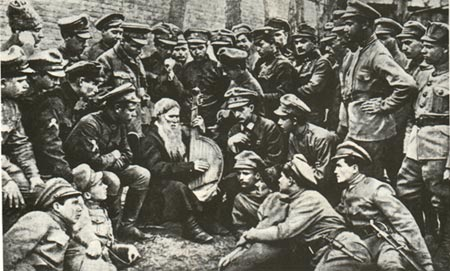
Soldiers of the Ukrainian People's Army

=== Main military formations of the Ukrainian People's Republic ===
- Sich Riflemen (established from former members of Ukrainian Sich Riflemen from the Austrian army)
- Free Cossacks

The following three Zaporizhian infantry regiments and the 3 Haidamaka Regiment of the biggest Ukrainian military formation, the Zaporizhian Corps, were later reorganized into the 1st Zaporizhian Division.

- Zaporizhian Corps
- Ukrainian Steppe Division (Anti-Bolshevik revolutionary-military unit)
- Ukrainian Marines
- 1st Riflemen-Cavalry Division (Greycoats)
- Bluecoats
- Sloboda Ukraine Haidamak Kish
- 3rd Iron Rifle Division
- Ukrainian People's Republic Air Fleet
- Navy of the Ukrainian People's Republic

=== Main military formations of the West Ukrainian People's Republic ===
- Ukrainian Galician Army

== Economy and financial system ==
=== Financial policies ===
Originally serving as a regional authority subordinate to the Russian Provisional Government, during the first months after the proclamation of Ukrainian People's Republic the Central Rada was dependent on financing from Petrograd. Its administrative control was weak, and state apparatus inefficient, which led to major financial issues.

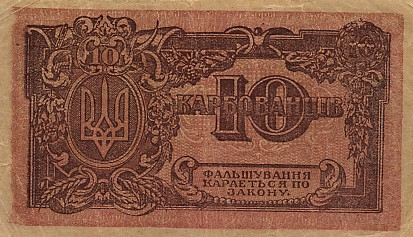
10 karbovantsiv (1918)

In December 1918 a temporary law about the issue of state banknotes by the UPR was adopted. According to this law: "Bank-notes must be issued in karbovanets" (Ukrainian: Карбованець). Each karbovanets contains 17.424 parts of pure gold and is divided into two hryvnias (Ukrainian: Гривня) or 200 shahs (Ukrainian: Шаг).

After the arrival of the Directorate to power, its government was forced to cover its needs through emission of paper currency, which caused inflation. On 4 January 1919 the Directorate approved a law, according to which hryvnia was to become the only legal currency, with circulation of Russian, German and Austrian money being outlawed.

In January 1920, the republic's state treasury was captured by mutinying troops commanded by otaman Omelian Volokh, who joined the Bolsheviks.

=== Economy ===
There were numerous banks in the republic among the most popular ones were the Ukrainabank and the Soyuzbank that were created by Khrystofor Baranovsky, leader of the cooperative movement.

During the summer of 1919 plans were created to use the stocks of sugar and alcohol from nationalized enterprises in order to exchange them for weapons from Romania, but they couldn't be realized due to the collapse on the frontline.

== Gallery ==
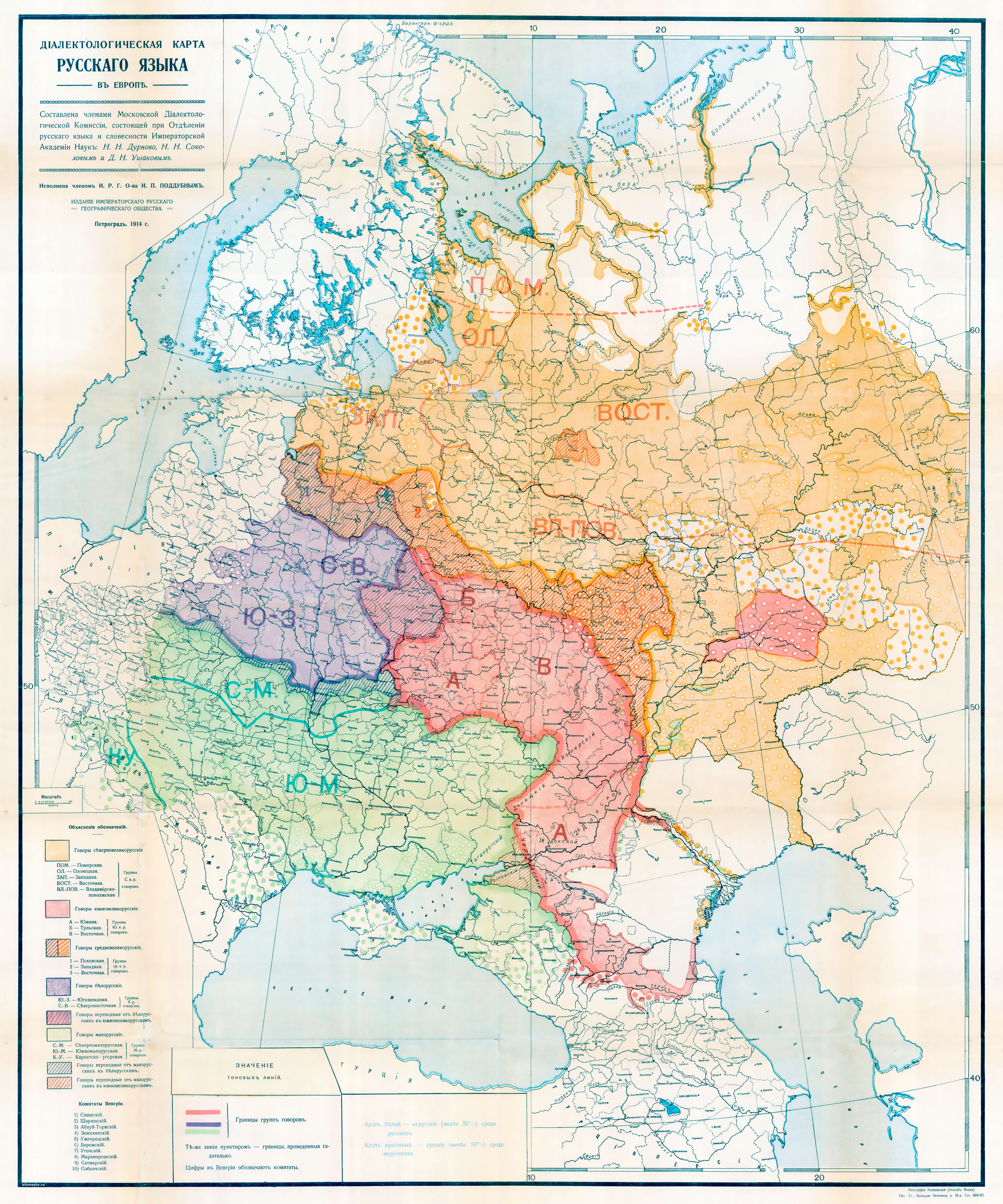
Language map published by the Imperial Russian Geographical Society in 1914, showing the Ukrainian ethnic territory in green

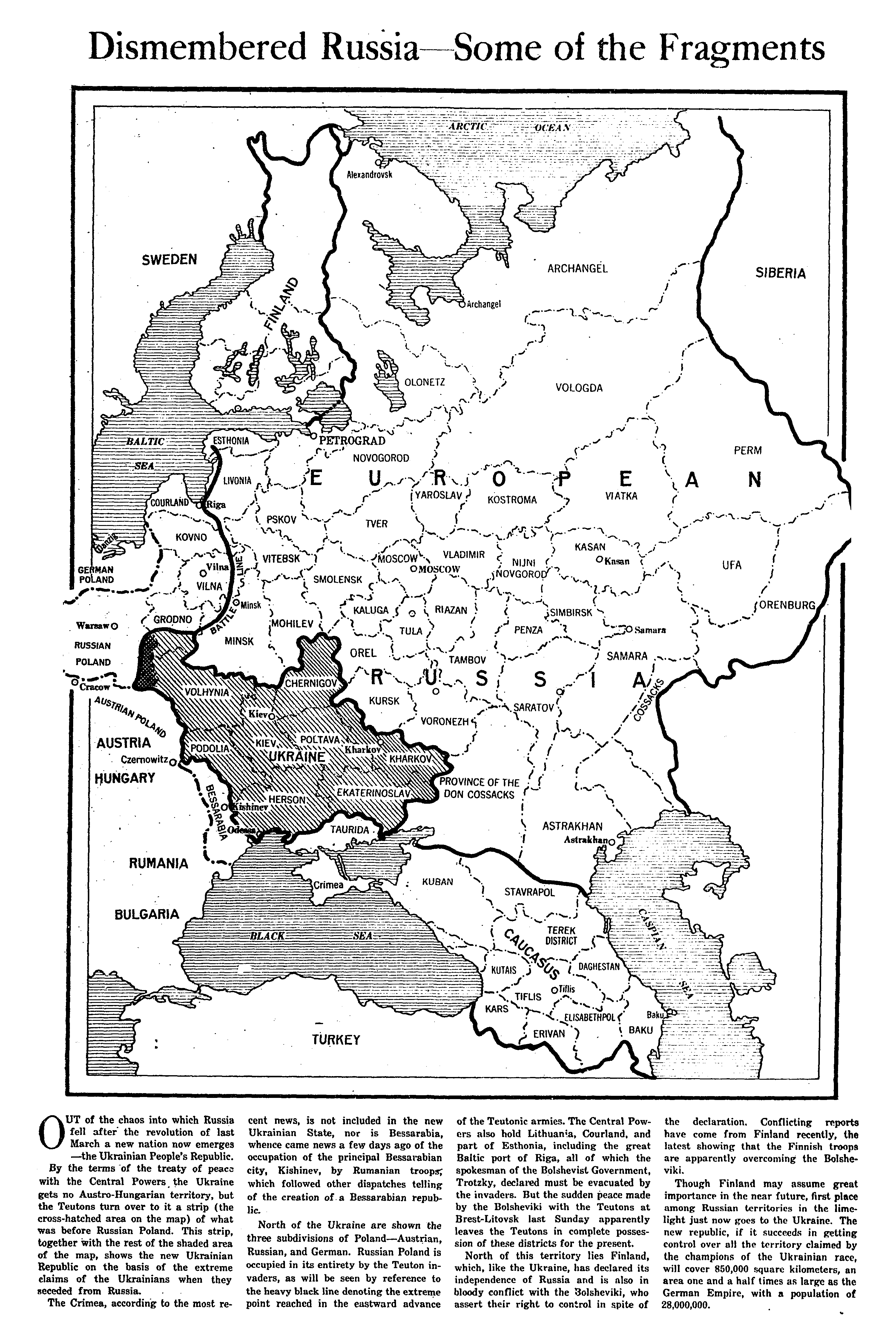
A February 1918 article from The New York Times shows a map of the Russian Imperial territories claimed by the Ukrainian People's Republic at the time, before the annexation of the Austro-Hungarian lands of the West Ukrainian People's Republic.

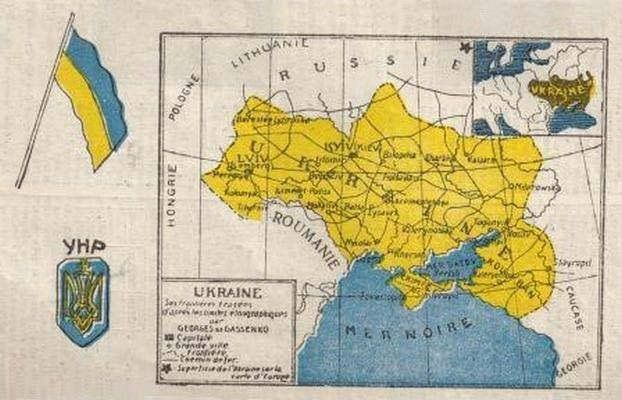
"Ukrainian People's Republic" – French-language map, dating from 1918

The area claimed by the Ukrainian People's Republic in 1919 (red and pink), compared with Ukraine after it regained independence in 1991 (red and green for the territories not claimed in 1919).

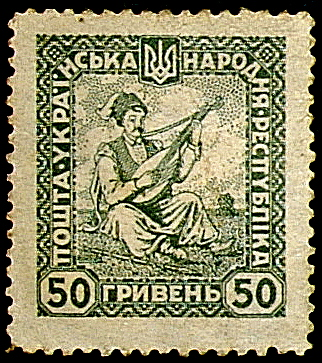
UPR postage stamp

== See also ==
- List of states and regions involved in the Russian Civil War
- Bibliography of the Russian Revolution and Civil War
- Outline of the Russian Revolution and Civil War
- General Secretariat of Ukraine
- West Ukrainian People's Republic
- Ukraine after the Russian Revolution
- Ukrainian Death Triangle
- Government of the Ukrainian People's Republic in exile

== Sources ==
- Kubijovyč, Volodymyr (1963). Ukraine: A Concise Encyclopædia. Vol. 1. Toronto: University of Toronto Press.
- Magosci, Paul Robert (1996). A History of Ukraine. Toronto: University of Toronto Press. ISBN 0-8020-7820-6.
- Subtelny, Orest (2000). Ukraine: A History (3rd ed.). Toronto: University of Toronto Press. ISBN 0-8020-8390-0.
- Talmon, Stefan (1998). Recognition of Governments in International Law. Oxford University Press. ISBN 0-19-826573-5.
- Velychenko, Stephen (2010). State building in revolutionary Ukraine: a comparative study of governments and bureaucrats, 1917–1922. Toronto: University of Toronto Press. ISBN 978-1-4426-4132-7.
- Yekelchyk, Serhy (2007). Ukraine: Birth of a Modern Nation (PDF). Oxford: Oxford University Press. ISBN 978-0-19-530545-6.
