= List of ambassadors of Ukraine to the Holy See =

Ambassador of Ukraine to the Holy See

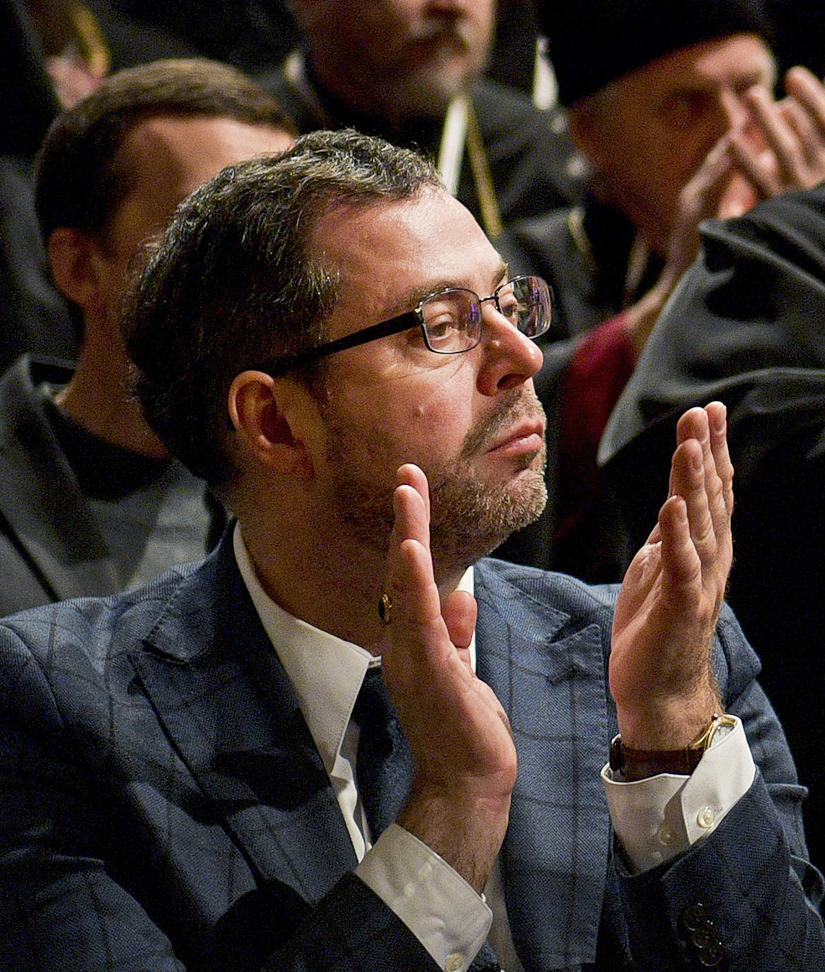
- Incumbent; Andrii Yurash since 7 April 2022
- Nominator: Volodymyr Zelenskyy
- Inaugural holder: Nina Kovalska as Ambassador Extraordinary and Plenipotentiary
- Formation: 2000
- Website: Ukraine Embassy – Vatikan

The Ambassador Extraordinary and Plenipotentiary of Ukraine to the Holy See and the Sovereign Military Order of Malta (Ukrainian: Надзвичайний і Повноважний посол України у Ватикані та Суверенному Військовому Мальтійському Ордені) is the ambassador of Ukraine to the Holy See (as well as the Sovereign Military Order of Malta). Since April 2022 the current ambassador is Andrii Yurash who succeeds Tetyana Yizhevska, who assumed the position in 2007; she assumed the position of ambassador to the Order of Malta in 2009.

The first Ukrainian ambassador to the Holy See assumed his post in 2000, the same year a Ukrainian embassy opened in the Vatican.

== List of representatives ==
=== Ukrainian People's Republic ===
- 1919–1919 Mykhailo Tyshkevych
- 1919–1921 Franz Xavier Bonne

=== Ukraine ===
- 1999–2003 Nina Kovalska
- 2004–2006 Hryhoriy Khoruzhyi
- 2007–2022 Tetyana Yizhevska
- 2022–present Andrii Yurash

== See also ==
- Ukrainian Embassy, Vatican
- Holy See Ambassador to Ukraine
