= Melnykites =

Political faction in Ukraine from 1940

Organisation of Ukrainian Nationalists (Melnykites)
- Організація українських націоналістів (Мельниківці)
- Emblem of the OUN(m)
- Leaders: Andriy Melnyk (1940–1964); Oleh Shtul [ukr] (1964–1977); Denys Kvitkovsky [ukr] (1977–1979); Mykola Plaviuk (1981–2012); Bohdan Chervak [ukr] (since 2012)
- Founded: 1940; 86 years ago
- Ideology: Ukrainian nationalism Integral nationalism; Ethnocracy: Anti-Polish sentiment; Anti-Hungarian sentiment; Anti-Romanian sentiment; Anti-Russian sentiment; Antisemitism; Anti-communism; National democracy (Ukraine)
- Political position: Far-right (Note: The modern OUN(m) established in 1993 does not disambiguate its factional alignment, having retained the name the 'Organisation of Ukrainian Nationalists'.)
- Website: kmoun.info

Melnykites (Ukrainian: Мельниківці, romanized: Melnykivtsi) is a colloquial name for members of the OUN-M or OUN(m), a faction of the Organisation of Ukrainian Nationalists (OUN) that arose out of a split with the more radical Banderite faction in 1940. The term derives from the name of Andriy Melnyk (1890–1964), the leader of the OUN formally elected to the post in August 1939 following the May 1938 assassination of the previous leader, Yevhen Konovalets, by the NKVD.

Following the release of OUN members from Polish prisons in 1939, Stepan Bandera and his followers rejected Melnyk's leadership due to disagreements around the composition of the OUN leadership and Bandera's intention to provoke an uprising in Soviet-controlled Galicia. The factional split became more embittered in the lead up to the German invasion of the Soviet Union.

The OUN(m) collaborated with Nazi Germany for much of the Second World War on the Eastern Front, contributing to the formation of various collaborationist units over the course of the conflict. The OUN(m) despatched expeditionary groups to shadow the Wehrmacht's advance into the Soviet Union and set up local administrations in occupied-Ukraine, though from November 1941 onwards its members were subjected to violent crackdowns by the German authorities. The Bukovinian OUN(m) initially carried out anti-Jewish pogroms in surrounding villages and, as members of Ukrainian Auxiliary Police units, many Melnykites were complicit in the implementation of the Holocaust in Ukraine.

From October 1942, the OUN(m) and local Melnykites set up partisan units that competed for influence with Banderite, Polish, and Soviet partisan groups, while some OUN(m) partisans independently resisted the German occupation and participated to a peripheral extent in the massacres of the Polish population of Volhynia in 1943. Almost all of them were forcibly disarmed or merged into the Banderite Ukrainian Insurgent Army (UPA) by the autumn of that year. Around the same time, the local Melnykite leadership around Lutsk negotiated the formation of the Ukrainian Legion of Self-Defense under the SS that combatted Soviet partisans and pacified Polish towns and villages.

Almost the entirety of the OUN(m) leadership were arrested by the Nazis over the course of the war. However they were later released in October 1944 in order to negotiate support for the retreating German Army, which was suffering from manpower shortages, with a broad spectrum of Ukrainian nationalist groups represented under the Ukrainian National Committee. With the war nearing its end, and Nazi officials still rejecting demands for the recognition of Ukrainian statehood, Melnyk and his supporters withdrew from the committee and travelled west in early 1945 to meet the Allied advance.

During the Cold War era, the exiled OUN(m) moderated its ideology away from fascism, and in 1993 registered as a non-governmental organisation in independent Ukraine. Since 2012, the OUN(m) has been led by activist and historian Bohdan Chervak.

== Background ==
A veteran of the First World War (1914–1917) and the Ukrainian War of Independence (1917–1921) serving as a colonel in the Sich Riflemen and the wider Ukrainian People's Army (UNA), Andriy Melnyk was a founding member of the Organisation of Ukrainian Nationalists (OUN) in 1929 as well as having cofounded its predecessor, the Ukrainian Military Organisation (UVO), in 1920. Despite having largely stepped back from direct engagement in the UVO and OUN underground since his imprisonment by the Polish authorities from 1924 to 1928, Melnyk was selected by the Leadership of Ukrainian Nationalists (the OUN's executive command in exile, hereon the PUN or the Provid) in the aftermath of Yevhen Konovalets's assassination in May 1938, while Melnyk was reportedly named in Konovalets's oral will as his preferred successor.

At the Second Great Congress of Ukrainian Nationalists in Rome on 27 August 1939, Melnyk was formally ratified as leader of the OUN and reaffirmed its ideology (Note: A more extensive account can be found in a dedicated article on Russian Wikipedia.) as continuing in the vein of natsiokratiia (Note: The term was coined by the OUN's chief theorist Mykola Stsiborskyi in his 1935 book by the same name that, according to historian Taras Kurylo, advocated for the organisation of a future Ukrainian state on the principles of authoritarianism, corporatism, and solidarism closely resembling those of Fascist Italy. Historian Kai Struve offers the term 'ethnocracy' as a more contemporary translation.) (literally translating to 'natiocracy'), which has been characterised by scholars as a Ukrainian form of fascism and/or integral nationalism, itself sometimes characterised as proto-fascist, or more broadly as extreme or radical nationalism influenced by fascist movements. Historian Franziska Bruder describes the OUN as a classic example of the nationalist movements with fascist characteristics that emerged during the interwar period in Central and Eastern Europe. According to historian Georgiy Kasianov, OUN ideologues borrowed much from Italian Fascism but also emphasised the differences between Ukrainian radical nationalism and established fascist movements. At the conference, Melnyk was styled under the title vozhd in the Führerprinzip tradition.

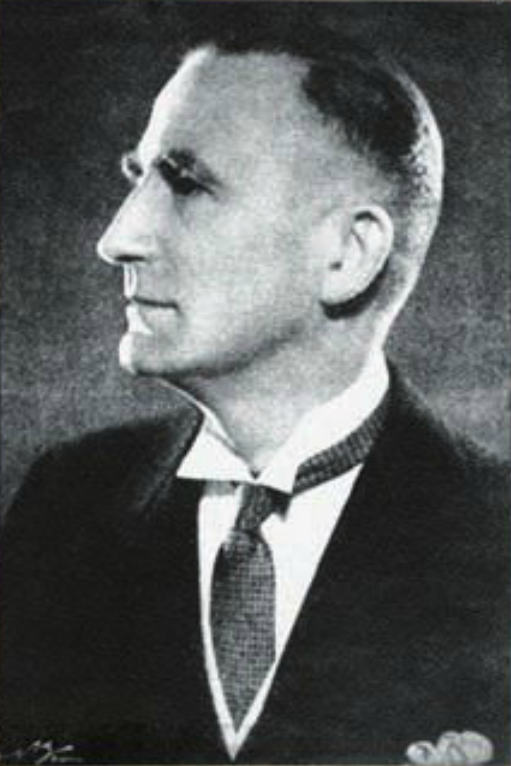
Melnyk, c.1940

Melnyk was chosen for his more moderate and pragmatic stance; his supporters generally held Vyacheslav Lypynsky in high regard and often distanced themselves from Dmytro Dontsov's ideology in public. Melnyk's supporters were mostly made up of an older, more conservative (Note: In that they adhered more closely to the initial principles of the OUN relative to the Banderites.) and cautious generation that largely composed the exiled PUN, with many having fought in the failed independence war. The OUN made efforts to identify with European fascist movements in the late 1930s, with OUN ideologue Orest Chemerynskyi (Note: Pen name Yaroslav Orshan. According to historian Taras Kurylo, Orshan was "distinguished" in his work. Distinct from treasurer of the OUN home command Yaroslav Chemerynskyi.) asserting in a 1938 article that "nationalisms" such as Fascism, National Socialism, and Ukrainian nationalism were "national expressions of the same spirit". In 1939, the Cultural Department of the OUN (Note: An organ of the PUN.) set up a Commission for the Study of Fascism, according to historian Taras Kurylo with the aim of constructing a theoretical basis for this identification, though these plans were interrupted by world events.

A younger and more radical faction of the OUN heavily inspired by Dontsov's works were dissatified with Melnyk's leadership and demanded a more charismatic and radical leader. This generational divide, that had been largely up until then successfully managed by Konovalets's leadership, led the younger more radical generation to coalesce around Stepan Bandera. Bandera was in prison for his role in the assassination of Polish Interior Minister Bronisław Pieracki and had attained notoriety for the publicity that arose from the 1935 Warsaw and 1936 Lviv trials.

Prior to the split, Melnyk and members of the PUN had been recruited into the Abwehr from 1938 onwards, with Melnyk assigned the codename 'Consul I', whereby the PUN collaborated with Nazi military intelligence to plan the OUN Uprising of 1939 that sought to disrupt the Polish rear during a German invasion and was largely aborted due to the Nazi–Soviet Pact. In a Vienna meeting in early September, Melnyk was directed by Wilhelm Canaris to oversee the drafting of a constitution for a west Ukrainian state which was completed in 1940 by Mykola Stsiborskyi, the OUN's chief theorist and organisational officer, and encompassed the establishment of a totalitarian state under a Vozhd (Col. Melnyk) with the Ukrainian-Jewish population singled out for distinct and ambiguous citizenship laws.

== Split with the Banderite faction ==
In January 1940, and following the release of OUN members held in Polish prisons during the Nazi-Soviet partition of Poland that unified Ukrainian lands under the Soviet Union, Bandera travelled to Rome with a series of demands, among them the replacement of certain members of the Provid with members of the younger generation though this was rejected by Melnyk. (Note: Accounts of the remaining demands, written postwar, vary with John Alexander Armstrong treating these sources with trepidation. Historian Ivan Patryliak reports that Bandera and his entourage wanted the OUN to establish contacts with Western powers while Melnyk's objections were rooted in practical constraints. Patryliak asserts that Melnyk was concerned that the Soviet crackdown that would inevitably follow an attempted 'revolution' would severely weaken the organisation. Patryliak stresses that these discussions occurred in the context of the Nazi-Soviet pact.) Bandera subsequently made a challenge to the PUN on 10 February by establishing a 'revolutionary' Provid in Nazi-occupied Kraków to inflexibly prepare for a revolution in Soviet-controlled Galicia, turning down Melnyk's offer to allow him an advisory position in the PUN.

On 5 April, Melnyk and Bandera met in Rome in a final unsuccessful attempt to resolve the growing divide between the two emerging factions with Melnyk declaring the Revolutionary Leadership illegal on 7 April and appealing on 8 April for OUN members not to join the 'saboteurs'. Melnyk decided to put the members of the Revolutionary Leadership before the OUN tribunal, in response to which Bandera and Stetsko rejected Melnyk's leadership and responded in kind. The OUN subsequently fractured into two rival organisations: the Melnykites (Melnykivtsi or the OUN(m)) and the Banderites (Banderivtsi or the OUN(b)), with Melnyk continuing efforts in vain to try to repair the schism. The tribunal officially removed Bandera from the OUN (effectively now the OUN(m)) on 27 September.

Of the three Provid members that Bandera demanded be replaced, he and his followers' accusations encompassed Omelian Senyk losing OUN documents to the Czech and subsequently Polish police as chief administrative officer to Konovalets in the run up to Bandera's and fellow OUN members' trials, Mykola Stsiborskyi (the OUN's chief theorist) having a debate in passing with a Communist agent that attempted to recruit him, and Yaroslav Baranovsky's brother being an agent for the Polish police. (Note: Bandera and his followers claimed that these members were compromised by hostile spy networks. John Alexander Armstrong surmises that these claims were less than plausible.) Former president of the short-lived Carpatho-Ukraine Avgustyn Voloshyn praised Melnyk for having an ideology based in Christianity and for not placing the nation above God while auxiliary bishop of the Ukrainian Catholic Archeparchy of Lviv Ivan Buchko declared that nationalists possessed an outstanding leader in Melnyk.

=== Polemic ===
Latent tensions about the non-Ukrainian ethnic background of Richard Yary, a central member of the OUN(b) behind the split and the only member of the Provid to join it, his wife who was born an Orthodox Jew, and corruption allegations against him dating back to UVO cooperation with Weimar Germany, as well as the personal life of Mykola Stsiborskyi whose third wife was Jewish, became the focus of a polemic that ensued between the two factions. It's possible that an alleged spat between Stsiborskyi and Yaroslav Stetsko where Stsiborskyi dismissed Stetsko from his duties in preparation for the 1939 Second Great Congress, asserting that he was unable to complete them satisfactorily, had contributed to the tensions between Bandera's supporters and the Provid.

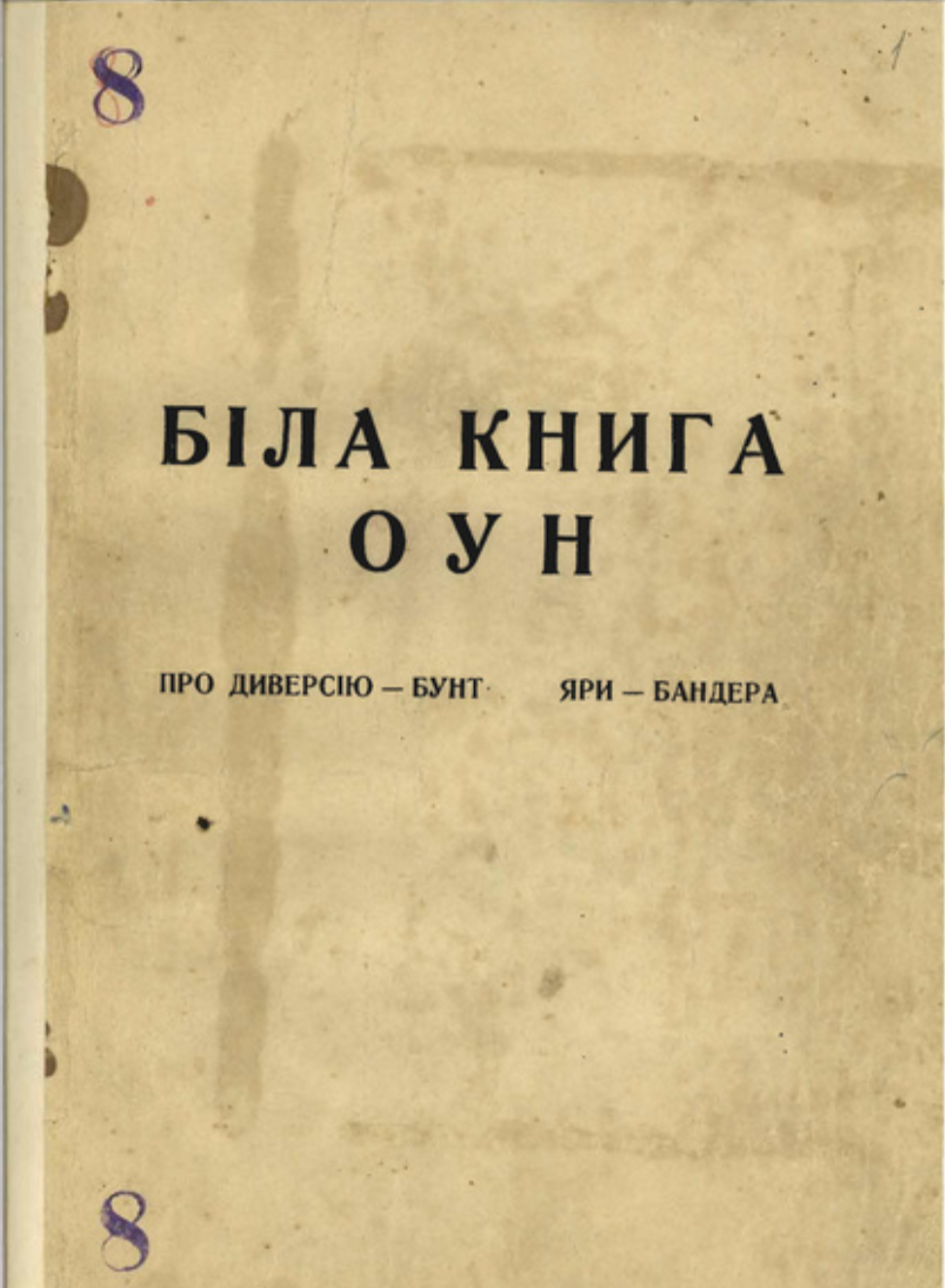
Cover of the 1940 white book.

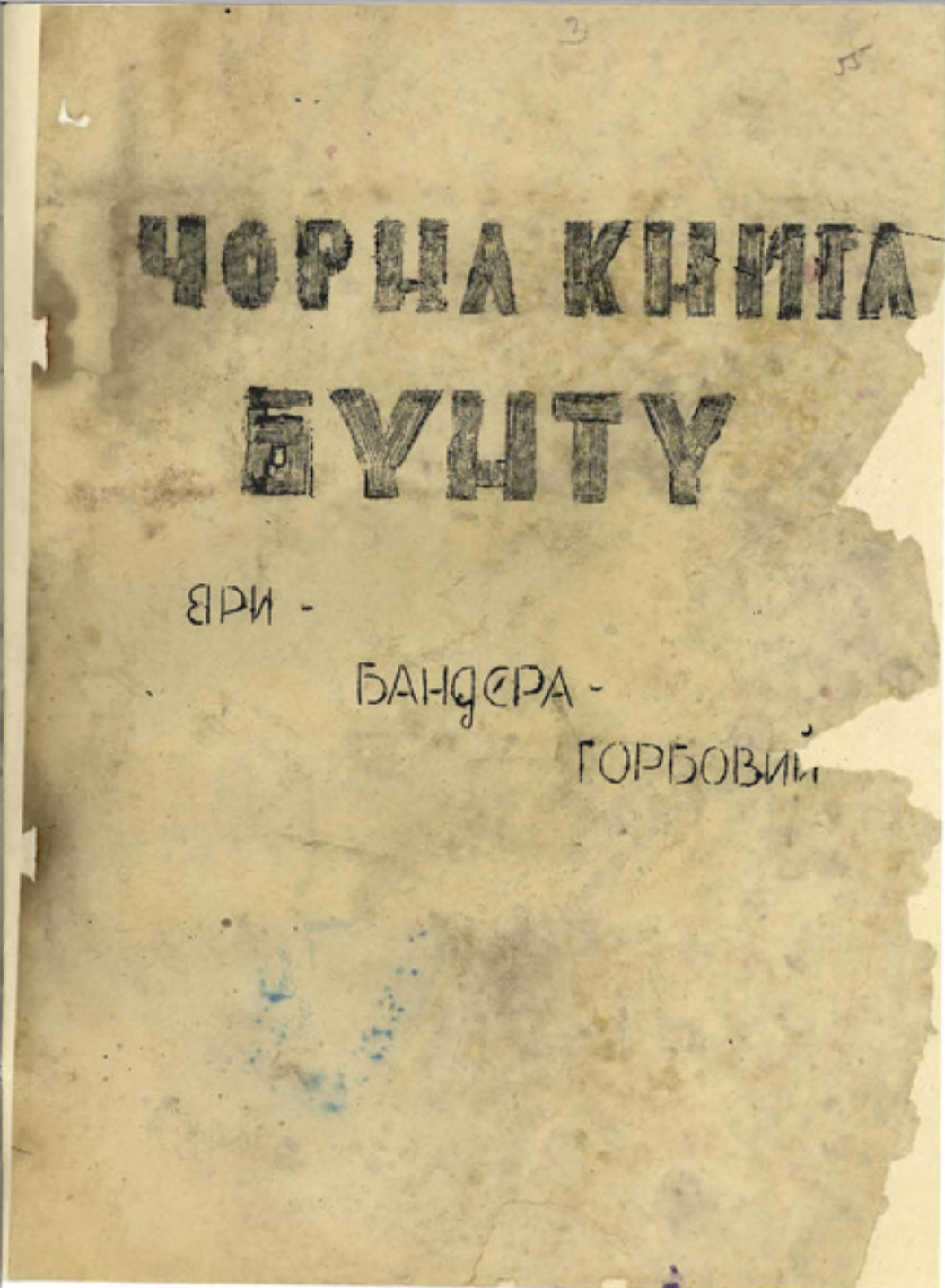
Cover of the July 1941 black book.

In an August 1940 letter addressed to Melnyk, Bandera stated that he would accept the colonel's authority if he removed traitors from the PUN, especially Stsiborskyi whom he lambasted for possessing an absence of "morality and ethics in family life" and for marrying a "suspicious" Russian-Jewish woman. In late 1940, Stsiborskyi published a white book in response on the "Yary-Bandera diversion-rebellion" (Bila knyha OUN: Pro dyversiiu-bunt Iary-Bandera) in which he recited the course of correspondence and rebuked the Banderites' allegations. Bandera was portrayed as a puppet of Yary who had pocketed OUN funds and who had been scheming against the Provid for over a decade. (Note: Stsiborskyi's white book avoided invoking antisemitic tropes against Yary.)

Melnykites argued for subordination to the legitimate leader, with an October 1940 issue of OUN(m) periodical Nastup (Offensive) denouncing followers of Bandera for succumbing to the "liberal-democratic vices" of individual defiance of authority and party intrigue. In July 1941, the OUN(m) published a "Black Book of Rebellion" (Chorna knyha buntu: Iary–Bandera–Horbovyi) that characterised Yary as "by origin a Czech-Jewish crossbreed" and dismissed Bandera as Yary's "goy" while an OUN(b) newspaper was accused of furthering the two's "Marxist Jewish revolution".

=== Activity in occupied Poland ===
Melnykites dominated the Ukrainian National Union (UNO) (Note: Set up by Petliurites in 1933 as a legal association in Germany whereupon it became largely inactive and was expropriated by OUN members in 1937.) based in Kraków which grew from several hundred members in 1939 to 57,000 by 1942 and operated branches based in Berlin, Vienna, and Prague. The UNO was set up to consolidate and organise Ukrainians in German territory and deliver cultural events, though proposals that it administer Ukrainians (Note: This included an estimated 20,000 Ukrainians fleeing Soviet occupation, with Kraków becoming a centre for Ukrainian refugees.) in occupied-Poland and be allowed to use Ukrainian national symbols were rejected and in mid-1941 it was forbidden to accept new members from the territory of the General Government.

OUN(m) Provid member and former UNA colonel Roman Sushko played an integral role in setting up the collaborationist Ukrainian Central Committee (UTsK), nominating Volodymyr Kubijovyč to lead it. The UTsK, sanctioned by Nazi officials in order to play the Ukrainian and Polish populations off of one another, was formally established in April 1940 and administered social and cultural services in the Ukrainian ethnographical area of the General Government. While it officially remained neutral in the split of the OUN, Kubijovyč's UTsK tacitly supported Melnyk's faction with many positions initially held by OUN(m) members. A group of young Bandera adherents attempted to take over the committee's headquarters and were ejected by Sushko. In August, Sushko led a small group of Melnykites in a raid on the OUN(b)'s headquarters, disrupting their press operation whereafter mutual attacks on the factions' offices continued through 1940 and violence spilled out onto the streets of Kraków.

In April 1941, the Banderite faction held the Second Great Congress of Ukrainian Nationalists in Kraków where Bandera was proclaimed providnyk of the OUN (technically the OUN(b)), having declared the original 1939 Second Great Congress of Ukrainian Nationalists that had officially ratified Melnyk as leader to have been arear of internal laws. (Note: Bandera and his followers also claimed that Konovalets's oral will naming Melnyk as his successor was a fabrication.) The bulk of the Galician youth defected to the Banderites, however the OUN(m) retained the support of Ukrainian nationalists in Northern Bukovina, which had been annexed by the Soviets in mid-1940 and was later recaptured by German and Romanian forces in mid-1941, providing the organisation with approximately 500 much-needed generally younger members. Though Melnyk received widespread support among Ukrainian émigrés abroad, Bandera's position on the ground in Western Ukraine and the demographics of his base meant that he gained control of the vast majority of the local apparatus in the region. Effective Soviet repression in Central and Eastern Ukraine meant that most of the Ukrainians living in these regions were unaware of the split in the OUN, benefitting the more active Banderites in their battle for legitimacy.

== The Second World War and collaboration with the Nazis ==
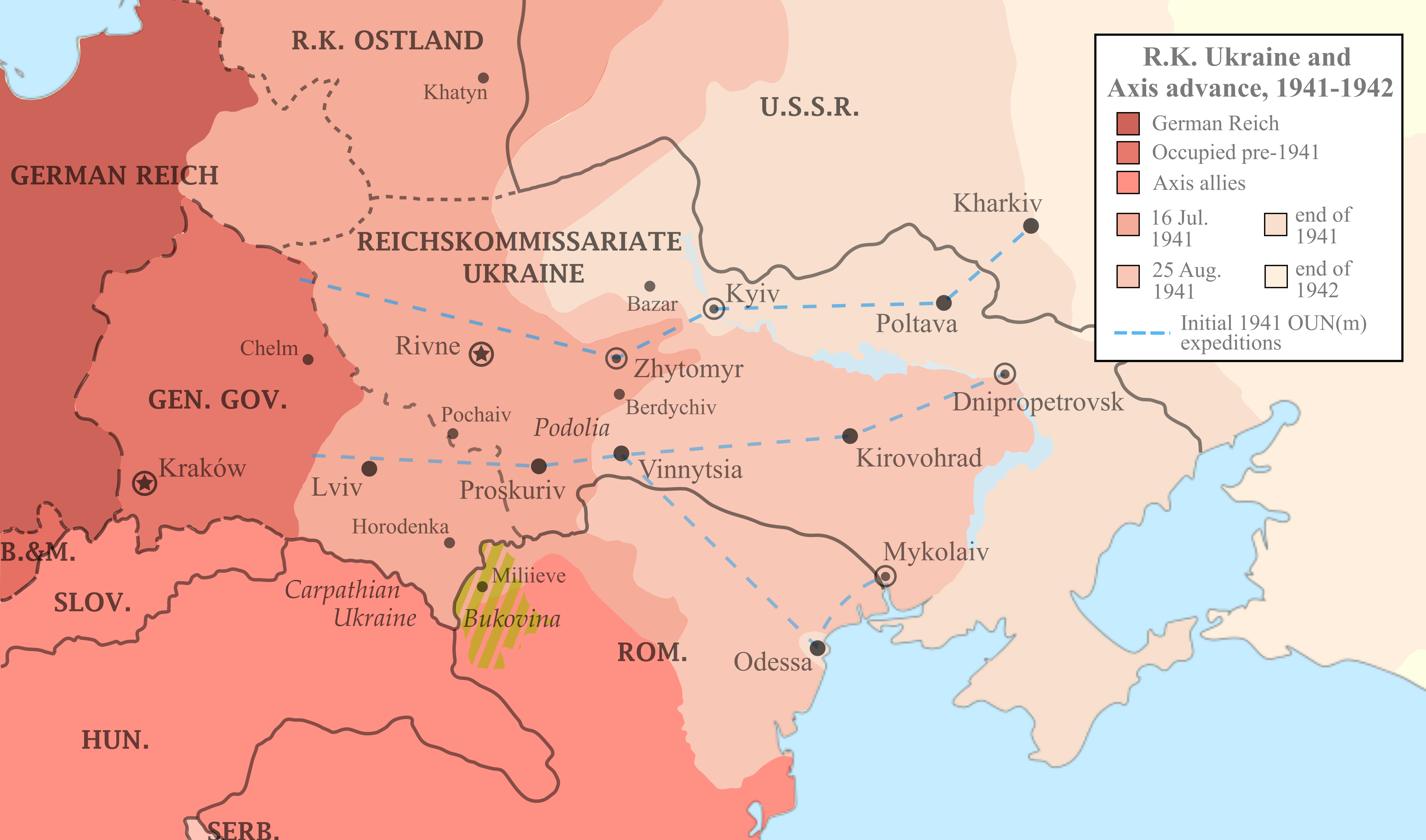
Map of the Reich Commissariat of Ukraine, the 1941-1942 Axis advance into the Soviet Union, and the initial 1941 OUN(m) expeditionary groups. (Note: Starting points taken from the Encyclopedia of Ukraine; paths from a map in Armstrong (1963, p. 78)).

From their bases in Berlin and Kraków, the OUN(m) and OUN(b) formed expeditionary groups, intending to follow the Wehrmacht into Ukraine during the June 1941 German invasion of the Soviet Union to recruit supporters and set up local governments with the OUN(b) having formed the Nachtigall and Roland battalions under the Abwehr in February. One group of Melnykites based in Chelm attempted to march into Volhynia intending to precede the Wehrmacht advance and welcome German troops, though they were ambushed and killed by OUN(b) members on the banks of the River Bug.

In July, 500 OUN(m) members penetrated into Ukraine in the form of expeditionary groups, each tasked with a specific route, from bases organised on the territory of the General Government whereafter they organised municipal administrations, civic institutions, schools, and newspapers. The first expeditionary groups into Central and Eastern Ukraine were directed by Provid members Mykola Stsiborskyi and Omelyan Senyk. In contrast to the OUN(b) that unilaterally proclaimed an independent Ukrainian state in Lviv on 30 June, the OUN(m) avoided such actions and sought to gain favour with the SS and the Wehrmacht, serving as interpreters and advisors, in pursuit of a military-political arrangement similar to that of Tiso's Slovakia and Ustaša Croatia. (Note: Radchenko: "During the German-Soviet war, the OUN (m) tried to establish cooperation with the Reich in order to create a totalitarian Ukrainian state within Hitler's 'New Europe'. The Melnykites had more patience than the Banderites and were ready to make concessions to the Germans. For example, they agreed to postpone the proclamation of Ukrainian independence. Supporters of Colonel Melnyk expressed their willingness to work in collaborationist bodies (police, self-government), propaganda, serve in the Wehrmacht or SS and thus 'build a state from below'.") Melnykites met with Reichskommissar Erich Koch in Lviv to assure the Germans of their loyalty though Melnyk himself would nevertheless have his movements restricted to Berlin under house arrest in mid-1941.

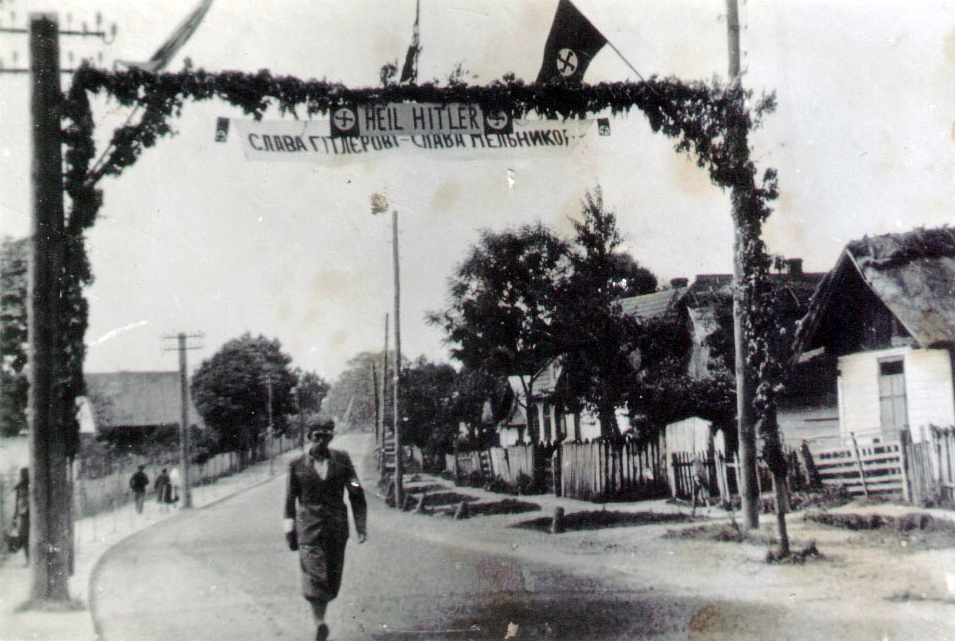

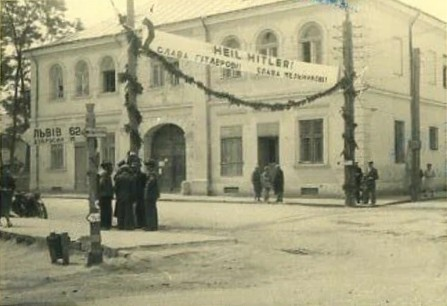
Triumphal arches welcoming the Nazi occupation in Western Ukraine.
In Cyrillic, they read "Glory to Hitler! - Glory to Melnyk!".

Following the recapture of Northern Bukovina by Romanian and German forces in mid-1941, the Romanian authorities severely repressed Ukrainian nationalists leading to outbreaks of fighting in some districts between Ukrainian nationalists and the Romanian gendarmerie, following which nationalists fled to the territory of the Reichskommissariat Ukraine where they were assisted by Melnykite collaborators in joining Ukrainian Auxiliary Police units. The local police forces were generally complicit in the implementation of the Holocaust whereby they guarded Jewish ghettos, rounded up Jews for extermination, and sometimes participated in massacres.

On the orders of the Bukovinian OUN(m), headed by Petro Voinovsky, several hundred Jews were killed in a number of villages. Germans and Romanians were absent during these killings. On 5 July, 20 volunteers led by Voinovsky found and shot 120 Jews in the village of Miliieve. The OUN(m) formed the 900-strong Bukovinian Battalion (Bukovynskyi Kurin) under the Abwehr in August, headed by Voinovsky, which was hoped to later provide the basis for a Ukrainian army. The Bukovinian Battalion subsequently merged with Transcarpathian OUN(m) formations in Horodenka on 13 August, numbering approximately 1,500, whereafter it shadowed the Wehrmacht's advance on the way to Kyiv and contributed to the formation of local self-government bodies with some members remaining in Podolia and others joining the local auxiliary police. Members of the Bukovinian Battalion contributed to the shooting of 12,000 Jews in Berdychiv on 15 September, carried out by the 45th Police Battalion and the staff of Higher SS and Police Leader SS-Obergruppenführer Friedrich Jeckeln.

Melnykites set up an administration in Zhytomyr, supplanting an embryonic OUN(b) administration, which served as the centre of OUN(m) activity in Ukraine. A local police force was established out of volunteers from a nearby Soviet prisoner-of-war camp as well as the newspaper Ukrainske slovo (Ukrainian Word; hereon US), with the intention of moving these operations to Kyiv as soon as possible. A group consisting of Stsiborskyi, Senyk, and Oleh Olzhych (Note: Olzhych (his pen name; real name Kandyba) had been prominent in the ranks of the OUN leadership for several years prior, just below the level of the Provid.) arrived in the city in late August, with Olzhych thereafter placed in charge of all OUN(m) expeditions. In mid-August, Stsiborskyi and Senyk had met with Taras Bulba-Borovets in Lviv and agreed to send him a number of trained officers for the UPA-Polissian Sich. On 30 August, Stsiborskyi and Senyk were shot dead by Stephan Kozyi, allegedly an OUN(b) member from Western Ukraine whereafter the Nazi authorities began a wider crackdown on the organisation. (Note: According to John Alexander Armstrong, it was also sometimes hypothesised that Stephan Kozyi, having been a former communist, was planted by Soviet agents. Kozyi was killed after a pursuit by German and Ukrainian police.)

=== Arrival in Kyiv ===
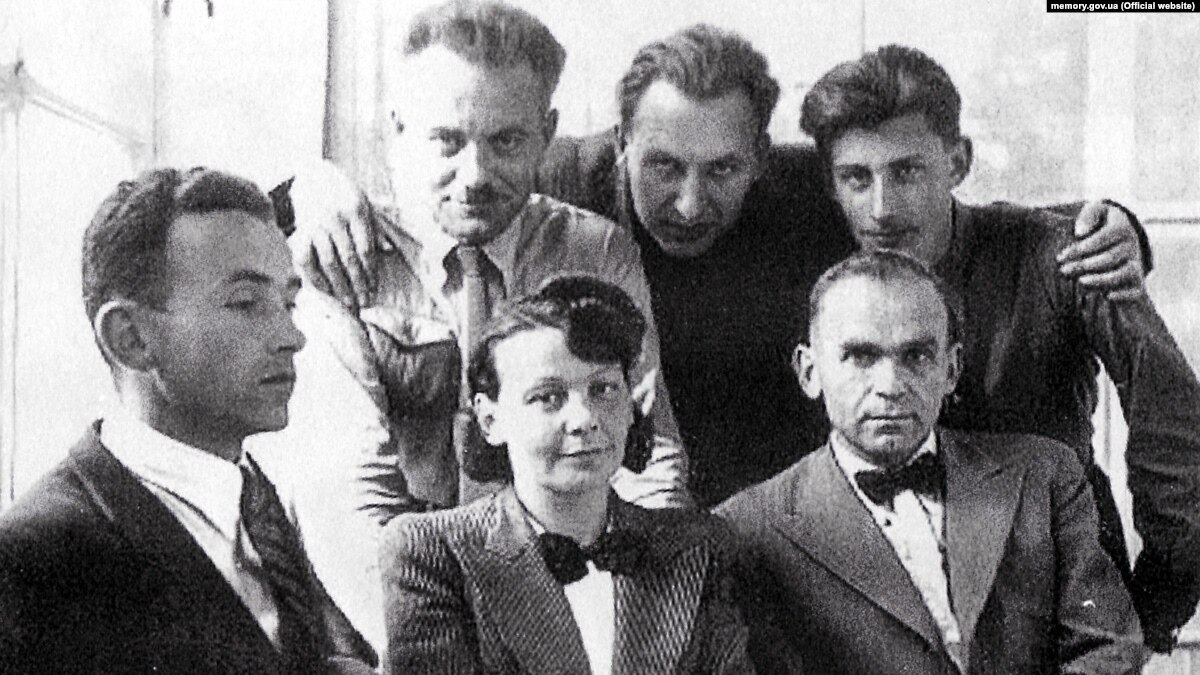
Ukrainian nationalists in Lviv in the summer of 1941. Back row: Mykhailo Mykhalevych (OUN(m)), Omelyan Koval (OUN(b)), and Yuriy Rusov. Front row: OUN(m) members Orest Chemerynskyi, (Note: Pen name Yaroslav Orshan.) Olena Teliha, and Ulas Samchuk.

Despite a secret directive by OUN(b) leadership not to allow Melnykite leaders to reach Kyiv (which Melnykites referred to as a 'death sentence'), a group of OUN(m) members reached the city before the Banderites in the days following its capture by the Germans on 19 September 1941. That same day a Melnykite hoisted a yellow-and-blue flag, accompanied by a swastika flag from 13 October, to the top of St. Sophia's Cathedral, though a squabble ensued with Banderites as to what way up the flag should be. (Note: This was a debate at the time— these Melnykites were on the side of yellow on top. Such flags became commonplace in Kyiv and elsewhere, though they had reportedly vanished in Kyiv in early 1942 and elsewhere by the autumn of that year. The flag in question faded several months later.) Members of the Zhytomyr police led by OUN(m) activists arrived in the following days and made an important contribution to the formation of the auxiliary police in Kyiv.

They were soon supplemented by expeditionary groups that included PUN members whereby a group led by Oleh Olzhych established the Ukrainian National Council (UNRada) (Note: Not to be confused with the Ukrainian National Council that had previously served as a representative body under the Austro-Hungarian Empire and as a legislature under the West Ukrainian People's Republic.) on 5 October, intended to serve as the basis for a future Ukrainian state, and persuaded Mykola Velychkivsky, a local university instructor, to chair it. Local historian Oleksander Ohloblyn agreed to become mayor of the collaborationalist Kyiv administration and was accepted by the Wehrmacht authorities, though the Germans replaced him on 1 November with his deputy, Volodymyr Bahaziy, who was a more enthusiastic sympathiser of the OUN(m) and funnelled money from the sale of Soviet equipment to the nationalist cause. (Note: Melnykites had previously overlooked Bahaziy, suspecting him of being a Soviet agent.)

Though popular among the small intelligentsia, the vast majority of Ukrainians were not nationally conscious and were largely indifferent to the idea of statehood, while discourse about Ukrainians' experiences during the Holodomor flourished in the absence of censorship under the USSR. (Note: Berkhoff: "The people of Soviet Ukraine may have shared the terrible legacy of the Great Famine of 1933, a total lack of accurate knowledge about what they called Europe, and an attitude toward the Germans that started with cautious optimism and turned into hate. But the native population generally lacked a strong social or ethnic identity. Dnieper Ukrainians spoke of "our people", a vague notion that included themselves and the Russians but generally excluded Galician Ukrainians.") Émigrés from Western Ukraine tended to be perceived by the local population as foreigners and though some local Ukrainians would enthusiastically support the campaign, the nationalists' radical Ukrainisation policies disrupted the lives of many locals and earned them antipathy alongside their occasionally monopolistic role in municipal administrations and their supposed attitude of superiority.

In coordination with the PUN, a group of Melnykites that arrived in Kyiv in September-October joined the Propaganda Abteilung U (Propaganda Division for Ukraine), a division of the Wehrmacht Propaganda Troops, and set up the newspaper Ukrainske slovo in Kyiv that had a circulation of over fifty thousand and propagandised the OUN(m), Ukrainian nationalism, and the German 'liberation'. (Note: Ukrainske slovo had previously been published in Paris from 1933–1940.) US published more than a hundred antisemitic articles from October to mid-December 1941 while chief editor Ivan Rohach, discussing the appointment of Alfred Rosenberg as Reichsminister of the Occupied Eastern Territories in a November issue, wrote that Rosenberg's appointment would contribute to "the speedy elimination of our common enemy— Jewish-Masonic Bolshevism". Part of the Bukovinian Battalion arrived in Kyiv in late September, with at least one other arriving in November, whereafter they subordinated themselves to the UNRada on 7 October. Some Melnykites were implicated in the Holocaust in Kyiv with historical accounts evidencing that they guarded and sorted the belongings of Jews murdered at Babyn Yar while historian Yuri Radchenko asserts that they probably participated in killings. Per Anders Rudling maintains that the participation of the Bukovinian Battalion in the extermination of Jews cannot be ruled out.

=== Beginning of Nazi crackdown ===
Though the Melnykites initially enjoyed support against the Banderites from the German military authorities, the OUN(m)'s growing strength in Central and Eastern Ukraine whereby they came to control a number of local administrations, police forces, and newspapers across the region and the incompatibility of Ukrainian statehood with Nazi designs led the SS and Nazi Party officials to overrule the Wehrmacht which, according to John Alexander Armstrong, "evidently believed that Germany really would support Ukrainian independence". (Note: Radchenko: "The German Nazis viewed the territory of Ukraine as their colonial space, where there were no plans to organise any Ukrainian (even puppet) governments. The German administration (primarily the SD) feared the radicalisation of the OUN(m). SD employees and RKU bureaucrats did not rule out that the radical wing of the OUN(m) could follow the path of the OUN(b): create an anti-German underground, start propaganda against the Reich, and engage in military resistance to the Nazis.") Following on from a mid-November meeting with Kyiv Gebietskommissar Friedrich Ackmann [de] where the leaders of the UNRada discussed plans to hold an event on 22 January (Note: This is the anniversary of the Fourth Universal of the Ukrainian Central Rada which declared the independence of the Ukrainian People's Republic from Bolshevik Russia in 1918.) 1942 commemorating Symon Petliura, a district official announced on 17 November the dissolution of the UNRada. This effectively liquidated the Bukovinian Battalion which by early November had swelled from approximately 700 to 1,500-1,700 strong (Note: According to Per Anders Rudling, this was due to reinforcements from volunteers arriving from Galicia and other parts of Ukraine, which included Soviet POWs recruited in Zhytomyr.) and whose members were subsequently dispersed, with many merged into auxiliary police battalions. Members of the Bukovinian Battalion subsequently formed the core of, among others (particluarly the 109th and 115th battalions), (Note: Having fought Soviet partisans in Belarus, the 109th battalion returned to Ukraine in mid-1944 where some of its members joined the Banderite UPA while the 115th was merged with the 118th in August and sent to France where many of its members deserted to join the French Forces of the Interior.) the 118th Schutzmannschaft Battalion in the spring of 1942 that would later be implicated in the 1943 Khatyn Massacre.

==== Bazar ====
As part of a planned series of rituals and commemorative demonstrations, Melnykites held a rally on 21 November 1941 in the town of Bazar commemorating members of the UNA executed by the Bolsheviks 20 years earlier at the end of the Second Winter Campaign. Between several hundred and several thousand people attended the event with speeches given by OUN(m) representatives and employees of the local occupation authorities while shouts of "Glory to Ukraine!" and "Glory to the leader Andriy Melnyk!" were heard alongside a choir-sung rendition of "Ukraine Has Not Yet Perished" (dating back to 1862, adopted by the Ukrainian People's Republic in 1917, and which would later provide the basis for the modern Ukrainian national anthem). Large scale arrests took place in Korosten Raion immediately after the rally ended whereafter they were transported to a former NKVD prison on the outskirts of Kyiv and interrogated.

About 200 Melnykites were arrested over the next few days with several dozen of the arrested OUN(m) activists and sympathisers executed by firing squad in early December. From 25 November, the Einsatzgruppen had an official policy to secretly execute Melnykites under the pretext of them looting Jewish property though a number of these cases were genuine.

==== US editorial staff ====
On 12 December, the editorial staff of Ukrainske slovo (incl. Rohach and co-editor Yaroslav Chemerynskyi) were arrested by the SD, with the newspaper publishing under the name Nove ukrainske slovo (New Ukrainian Word) from 14 December onwards, abandoning the pro-Melnykite editorial agenda. Having been briefly arrested by the SD on 20 December, Osyp Boidunyk travelled to Berlin, assisted by Petro Voinovsky, commander of the Bukovinian Battalion, where he informed the PUN and Melnyk of the situation in Ukraine. Melnyk and the PUN subsequently sent letters to Nazi officials, including a memorandum sent to Adolf Hitler, protesting the arrests and attempting to secure their release. To obtain Velychkivsky's signature for the memorandum, Boidunyk illegally returned to Kyiv in early 1942 where he posed as an arrested person with the help of Melnykites in the local police and Voinovsky, reportedly being saved by a sympathising SD employee who agreed to look the other way.

Though initially released on 24 December, the editorial staff were eventually executed in early January 1942, reportedly for 'failing to follow orders' with the same anonymous 1943 German report—historian Yuri Radchenko asserts that this was most likely authored by an employee of the Kyiv SD—alleging that an initial investigation of their offices discovered pro-Western Allies sympathies and chauvinist attitudes and that subsequent interviews of the editorial staff's circle provided a large amount of incriminating material against them. According to Radchenko, the editorial staff were probably incriminated by Russophones that contributed the Russian-language supplement of US. Edited by a Ukrainian Russian nationalist, Nove ukrainske slovo published several articles attacking the nationalists and promoting the Little Russian tradition while becoming extremely subservient to the Germans as a result of more invasive censorship policies.

==== February 1942 repressions in Kyiv ====
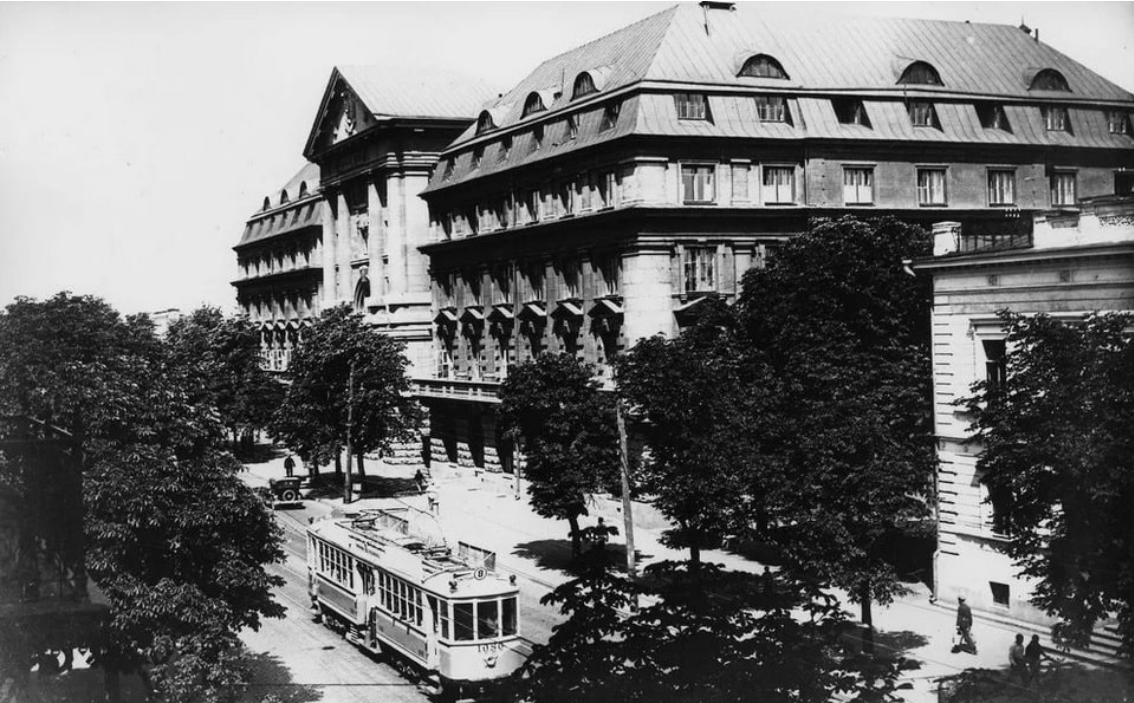
33 Korolenko Street, Kyiv in 1937. At the time it was an NKVD prison and it was later operated by the Gestapo and SD during the Nazi occupation. (Note: Today the building serves as the headquarters of the Security Service of Ukraine (SBU). Korolenko Street was renamed in 1944.)

After the disappearance of the US editorial staff, many Melnykites, including Oleh Olzhych who had only escaped detention due to the local police being controlled by the OUN(m), left Kyiv for Western Ukraine though some remained, poet Olena Teliha among them. Between 6–9 February 1942, several dozen OUN(m) members were arrested in Kyiv and held in a Gestapo/ SD prison at 33 Korolenko Street. Among them were Teliha and her husband, Orest Chemerynskyi, (Note: Pen name Yaroslav Orshan.) and Volodymyr Bahaziy. A 4 February report prepared by the SD had portrayed the OUN(m) as enemies of Nazi Germany, in contact with Great Britain and collaborating with the Bolshevik underground.

Hearing of Teliha's arrest, Ulas Samchuk turned to an acquaintance in the Rivne SD, SS-Hauptscharführer Albert Müller, who agreed to go to Kyiv in an effort to secure her release. Melnykites subsequently petitioned Alfred Rosenberg and his deputies, whereafter the Kyiv SD was ordered not to execute the arrested and a commission was sent from Berlin that secured the release of some of the prisoners, though the remaining Melnykites that had arrived in autumn 1941 had already been shot.

OUN(m) members' memoirs written in the 1970s-1990s generally claim that these individuals were executed at Babyn Yar, though this is disputed by modern historians such as Per Anders Rudling, Karel C. Berkhoff, and Yuri Radchenko. Radchenko asserts that, in the absence of supporting evidence, they could have been executed at many places in Kyiv and not necessarily Babyn Yar, with Teliha most likely taking her own life in prison following brutal beatings and torture based on the accounts of a fellow inmate at 33 Korolenko Street and the succeeding mayor of Kyiv, indirectly supported by other evidence. Rudling and Berkhoff conclude that the method and location of the executions is unknown but that their bodies probably ended up at Babyn Yar.

==== Further repressions ====
OUN(m) members assumed a semi-legal status in Ukraine, wary of further repressions, and attempted to preserve their positions in local police forces and self-government structures without provoking the Nazi authorities. On 21 March, Ulas Samchuk was arrested in Rivne by the SD, though he was released in April, as part of a wider crackdown in the spring of 1942 that included OUN(m) members in the SS such as Stepan Fedak (Melnyk's brother-in-law), who was also later released after a year in prison. Fedak subsequently joined the SS Galicia Division which was set up in May 1943 on the initiative of German governor of Galicia Otto Wächter and negotiated by Kubijovyč's Ukrainian Central Committee. OUN(m) members played a critical role in its development and supported recruitment efforts, with Provid member and former UNA general Viktor Kurmanovych endorsing it on Lviv radio. Further significant waves of repressions and executions against Melnykites occurred in late 1942 and throughout 1943 in different parts of Ukraine. Over the course of the Nazi occupation and from the start of Nazi repressions, some Melnykite activists were sent to the Syrets and Janowska concentration camps.

On 24–25 May 1942, Melnykites held the Pochaiv Conference in a village in southern Volhynia, possibly coordinated by Oleh Olzhych, the programme of which criticised the German occupation regime as a "system of terrorism" and "a system of planned basic extermination of Ukrainianness [ukraїnstvo [ukr]] by the forcible destruction of spiritual and cultural heritage and the complete inhibition of spiritual development, the exploitation and economic and social exhaustion of the broadest strata of the Ukrainian people, the inhuman physical extermination of all those who resisted the German pressure and in the future could become crystallisers and organisers of a new Ukrainian revival". Olzhych was elected deputy head of the PUN and director of the OUN(m) underground in Ukraine, subsequently overseeing preparations for the first OUN(m) armed detachments while Yaroslav Haivas travelled to Berlin to relay the decisions to Melnyk.

According to historian Yuri Radchenko, the further crackdowns by the SD on Melnykites in the police may have been provoked by leaflets and programme documents originating from a more radical wing of the OUN(m) that objected to the German occupation and attended an All-Ukrainian Congress of Ukrainian Independentists in Kyiv in August 1942. Radchenko also suggests that rather than simply being a pretext, SD allegations of collaboration with the Bolshevik underground may have been rooted in the discovery of a Soviet spy within the OUN(m) working in the Kharkiv administration in early 1942. An August 1942 German intelligence report describes the OUN(m) as akin to the "Bandera movement", judging the group to be "more dangerous" than the Banderites who openly declared their opposition to Germany.

=== Partisans ===
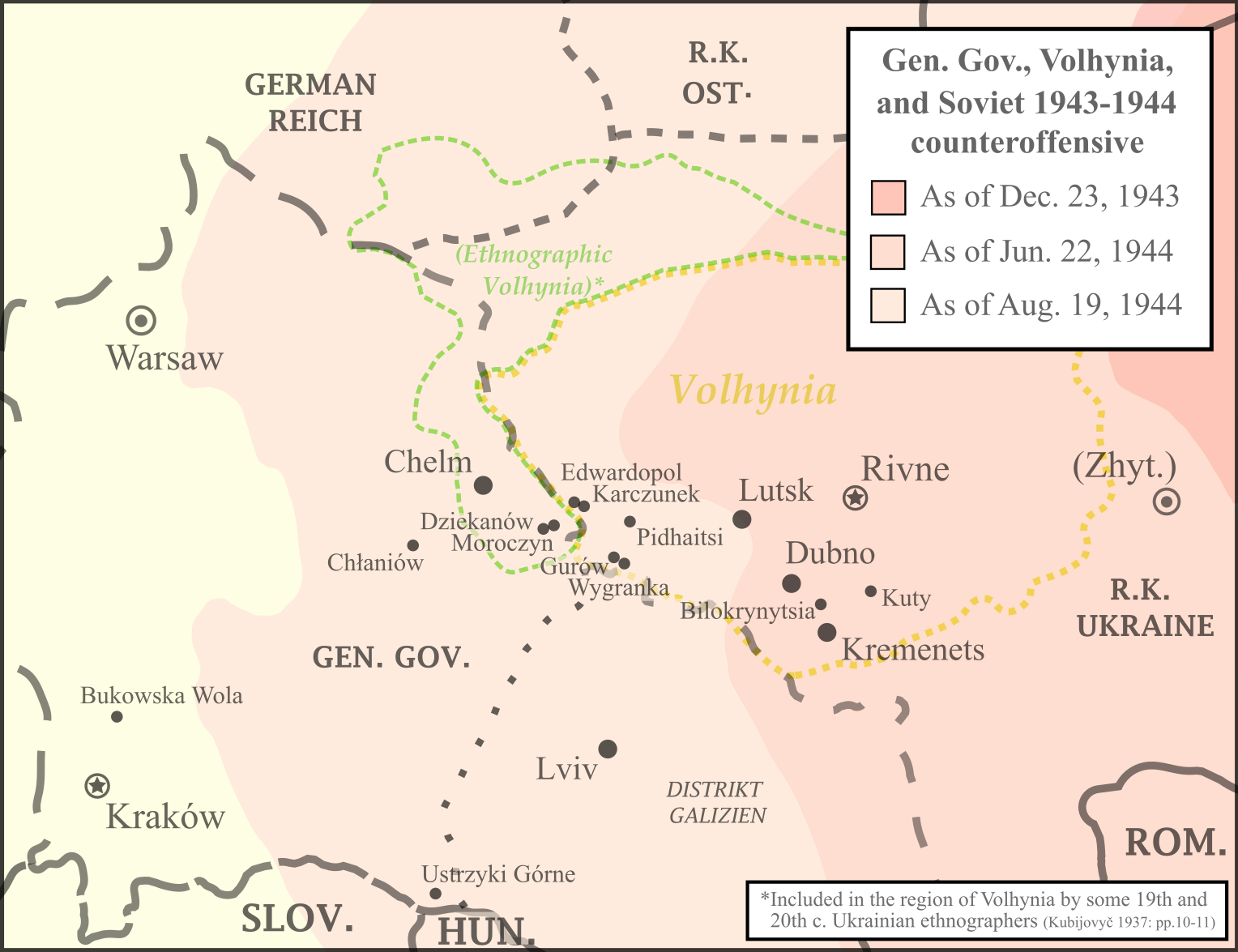
Map of Volhynia (Note: According to the Encyclopedia of Ukraine, Volhynia's borders have shifted considerably westwards over the centuries such that the region is today located entirely within modern Ukraine. 'Ethnographic Volhynia' as it appears here encompasses areas broadly considered ethnographically Ukrainian according to Volodymyr Kubijovyč's 1937 nationalities maps.) and the General Governorate for the Occupied Polish Region; 1943-1944 Red Army counteroffensive: Zhitomir–Berdichev offensive and Operation Bagration.

Despite the waves of repressions, Melnykite propaganda abstained from anti-Nazi and anti-German positions though the official Melnykite underground periodical Surma (Note: Originally clandestinely published from 1927-1934, from 1928 out of a printing house controlled by the Lithuanian government in Kaunas, whereafter it was forced to cease circulation amid a Polish crackdown on the OUN.) in a June 1943 issue detailed executions against Melnykite local administrations and sympathisers in Zhytomyr, Dnipropetrovsk, and Poltava, as well as repressions across central and eastern Ukraine, in which the Germans were referred to as those "who had their own special plans against Ukraine". Perhaps cognisant of anti-German sentiment and fearful of losing ground in Volhynia to the more active Banderite, Polish, and Soviet partisan groups, the OUN(m) set up partisan sotni from October 1942 onwards, largely on the initiative of rank-and-file members. The most active of these was active from March–August 1943 in the general vicinity of Kremenets and formed out of defectors from police units following the execution of a group of local OUN(m)-affiliated intellectuals. The OUN(m) didn't form its own partisan units in areas dominated by the UPA-Polessian Sich, around Rivne and Lutsk, instead despatching Oleh Shtul to Taras Bulba-Borovets's headquarters to oversee collaboration between the two organisations.

Foremostly directed against Soviet partisan formations, OUN(m) partisans also skirmished against Polish self-defence and partisan groups as well as independently conducting attacks against the German occupation, generally concerning raids of German prisons in order to free Ukrainians held there. Though for the most part committed by the larger and more pertinent Banderite Ukrainian Insurgent Army (UPA) while the OUN(m) was practically marginalised, OUN(m) partisans partook in massacres of Polish civilians whereby Ukrainian nationalists pursued a general policy of ethnic cleansing, especially targeting osadniks, Polish colonies, and locuses of the Polish underground as well as mixed villages. Though strongly discouraged by the leadership, OUN(m) partisans sometimes cooperated with OUN(b) formations on an ad hoc basis— the Kremenets partisans, which were dominant in the area, participated in several joint actions with the OUN(b), including, among others, a joint attack on the night of 30 April-1 May against the Polish village of Kuty. The two groups established a joint headquarters later that month whereafter they conducted attacks against a prison in Kremenets and a Schutzmann barracks in Bilokrynytsia.

On 7 May, OUN(m) partisans ambushed a German car on the Kremenets-Dubno road near Smyha in which Archbishop Oleksiy Hromadskyi of the Ukrainian Autonomous Orthodox Church was inadvertently killed along with his secretary, translator, and driver. Part of the Kremenets unit was disarmed by Banderites and absorbed into the UPA on 30 June, though still commanded by a Melnykite, and later carried out attacks on the Polish settlements of Gurów and Wygranka in which more than 100 civilians were killed on 11 July (Bloody Sunday). Almost all OUN(m) partisan formations in Volhynia were disarmed or forcibly merged into the UPA between the summer and autumn of 1943 with some Melnykite partisan officers executed by the Sluzhba Bezpeky, the OUN(b) underground's intelligence service.

Upon the commencement of anti-Polish "actions" by Banderite and a few Melnykite detachments in the summer of 1943, an anonymous article appeared in Surma that called for the annihilation of the Polish population of Volhynia. The article cast the Poles collectively as Ukrainians' historical imperialist enemy and pinned Polonisation under the Second Polish Republic on Polish colonists, henceforth asserting that "Ukrainians have the right and the duty to promulgate and strengthen the Ukrainian presence on this territory with all the means at their disposal".

Though Timothy Snyder asserts that the OUN(m) were "in principle committed to the same ideas" as the OUN(b) with regards to an ethnically homogenous state, he also states that the OUN(m) perceived a campaign of ethnic cleansing as neither desirable nor feasible. Individual Melnykites opposed the ethnic cleansing of Poles with historians Yuri Radchenko and Andrii Usach suggesting that this may have been largely confined to those close to Oleh Olzhych. In February 1944, Galician Melnykites issued a proclamation titled "We Accuse" that blamed the Banderite faction for provoking German pacifications, secretly murdering political rivals, and persecuting non-conforming Ukrainians while the Volhynia massacres were cast as "senseless" in that they only drove Poles to the cities, undermining Ukrainian posture in the region.

According to Snyder, where the OUN(b) perceived an "urgent need for independent action" in response to the German defeat at Stalingrad, the OUN(m) saw an opportunity for more productive collaboration with the Germans. An OUN(m) partisan sotnia named after Hetman Pavlo Polubotok operated in the Bieszczady Mountains near Ustrzyki Górne from July until early August 1944 when it was forcibly disarmed and merged into the UPA. According to historian Kostantin Bondarenko, the unit was formed with the intention of opening evacuation routes for OUN(m) members westwards.

=== Ukrainian Legion of Self-Defense ===
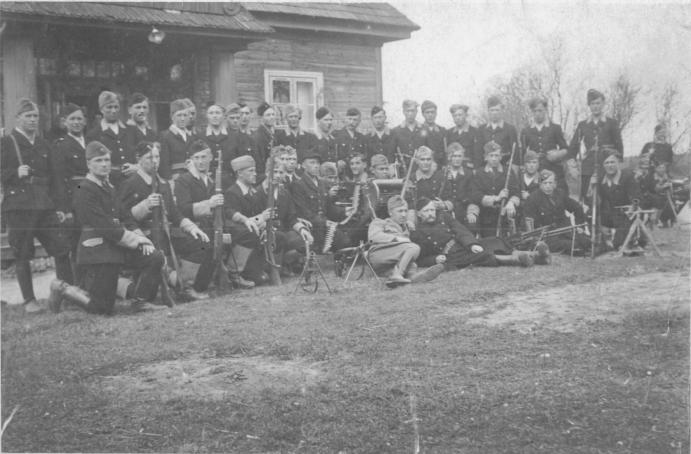
Members of the Ukrainian Legion of Self-Defence, date and location unknown.

In September 1943, representatives of the Volhynia regional council of the OUN(m) met with a number of pro-partnership SD and SiPo officers in and around Lutsk for negotiations pertaining to the cessation of German reprisals and the release of Melnykite, and also some Petliurite, prisoners. In November, they formed the Ukrainian Legion of Self-Defense (ULS), numbering 150 Melnykites (Note: OUN(m) partisans generally used pseudonyms to evade detection and protect their families from rival groups, especially those who joined the ULS many of whom were deserters from Schutzmannschaft and UPA formations.) and officially under the command of ten German SS officers, mostly from the Chelm SD. The ULS was allowed to have its own chaplain as well as being granted a propaganda arm, (Note: Historians Yuri Radchenko and Andrii Usach characterise the legion's output as "a sui generis synergism of Nazi and Melnykite ideologies".) the main output of which was the legion's official journal Nash Shlyakh (Our Path) that published antisemitic, Polonophobic, and Russophobic articles, characterising the conflict in its April 1944 first issue as a struggle "for the eradication of Polish [slur: lyashskyi] and Jew-Muscovite rule in Ukraine". Intended to combat Soviet and Polish partisans, the unit was deployed in late autumn to the village of Pidhaitsi, near Lutsk, until 18 January 1944. During this time, ULS soldiers shot between 30 and 100 Jewish civilians though it remains unclear if an order was given. Following a fierce battle against Soviet partisans on 11-12 February, the ULS conducted an "anti-partisan" action against the Polish villages of Karczunek and Edwardopol, near Volodymyr, on the night of 14–15 February.

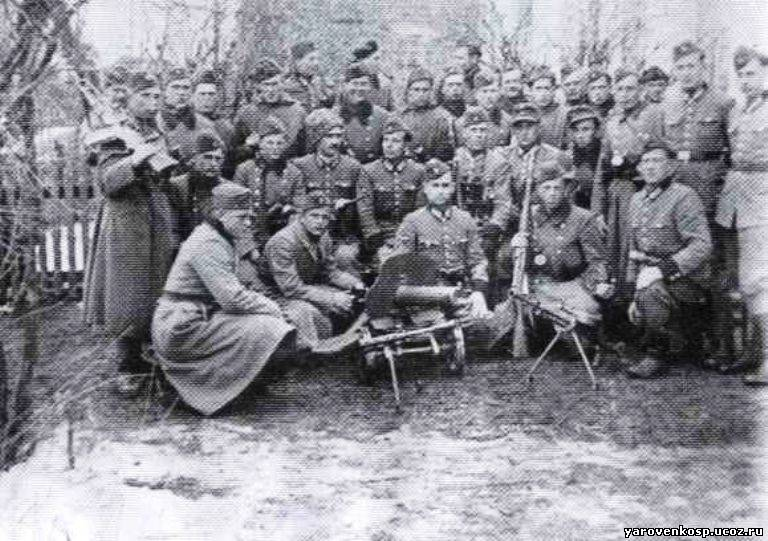
Members of the Ukrainian Legion of Self-Defense stationed in Hrubieszów County, 1944

In late February 1944, the ULS was redeployed to occupied-Poland, quartered and trained in the villages of Moroczyn and Dziekanów in Hrubieszów County where they combatted Polish partisans and pacified several Polish townships while legion soldiers were noted as having casually killed Polish civilians. Briefly being redeployed to Volhynia in June before returning to Poland in July, they captured and executed Banderite partisans, mobilised local inhabitants for forced labour, and continued attacks on Polish settlements. By the summer of 1944, the ULS numbered approximately 1,000 soldiers after a recruitment effort and the release of many Melnykites held in German prisons. On 22 July during a night march, ULS commander SS-Hauptsturmführer Siegfried Assmuss was killed in an inadvertent skirmish with Soviet partisans (Note: Historians have disagreed as to whether Assmuss was killed by Soviet or Polish partisans, both of which were active in the area at the time. According to Majewski, Polish historians generally claim that the partisans were Soviet while Ukrainian historians have generally claimed that they were Polish. According to Majewski the night march encountered Soviet partisans likely transporting their wounded who then opened fire on Assmuss's car.) in retaliation for which the unit massacred the nearby Polish village of Chłaniów which had served as a centre for People's Army partisans.

Rank-and-file members of the ULS and its Ukrainian commanders opposed the proposed relocation of the unit to Warsaw in August 1944 away from areas inhabited by Ukrainians, culminating in a show of force by German police and SS units who surrounded the village of Bukowska Wola where they were quartered, after which the legion was split into three units. A ULS combat group comprising a third of the legion's soldiers subsequently partook in street fighting in September during the suppression of the Warsaw Uprising whereafter the unit participated in Operation Sternschnuppe in late September. The legion was then reunified and continued to conduct anti-partisan operations in occupied-Poland. In February 1945, the ULS was relocated to occupied-Yugoslavia where they were quartered in the vicinity of Maribor and directed against Tito's partisans.

=== Fate of Melnykite leadership ===
Provid member Yaroslav Baranovsky was assassinated by the OUN(b) in Galicia on 11 May 1943, which was condemned by Catholic Metropolitan of Galicia and Archbishop of Lviv Andrey Sheptytsky. Roman Sushko was assassinated in Lviv on 14 January 1944, likely perpetrated by Banderites or possibly by agents of the Gestapo. Melnykites blamed the OUN(b) for the assassination.

Amid the Allied bombing of Berlin, Melnyk and his wife travelled to Vienna in late 1943 and were arrested by the Gestapo in late January 1944, concurrently with other PUN members, after which Oleh Olzhych became acting head of the PUN (and thereby the wider OUN(m)). Melnyk was transported first to a dacha in Wannsee to be interrogated, then in March to the alpine settlement of Hirschegg where he was held as a Sonderhaftling (special prisoner) at the Ifen Hotel. He was subsequently taken to Sachsenhausen concentration camp in July, later being moved on 4 September to a Zellenbau isolation cell. With ULS members distressed by the arrests of Melnyk and members of the OUN(m) leadership, Siegfried Assmuss travelled to Berlin, telling the soldiers on his return that they had been arrested for their "anti-German" stance and predicting that things would cool down and develop positively.

Oleh Olzhych was arrested by the SD in Lviv on 25 May and transported first to Berlin and then to Sachsenhausen in early June where he was kept in a Zellenbau cell for death row prisoners. Having been frequently interrogated and badly beaten over the next several days, which was unusual compared to the treatment of his neighbouring Ukrainian nationalists, Olzhych was found dead in his cell on 9 June— accounts on how he died vary between him succumbing to his injuries or taking his own life by hanging. (Note: Radchenko speculates that Olzhych's comparatively severe treatment was likely due to the discovery of a real or imaginary connection to the Western Allies given that the Normandy Landings had just occurred at the time.)

By autumn 1944, many OUN(m) members across Europe, including nearly the entire leadership bar former UNA generals Viktor Kurmanovych and Mykola Kapustiansky, (Note: Having previously acted as vice-president of the UNRada in Kyiv in 1941, Kapustiansky moved to Rivne on its dissolution and then Lviv where he was briefly arrested by the Gestapo in early 1944 and subsequently kept under surveillance.) were being held in various German prisons, with Melnyk claiming to a fellow prisoner at the Ifen Hotel to have been interrogated for a list of such members when he was held in Wannsee.

==== Release and the Ukrainian National Committee ====
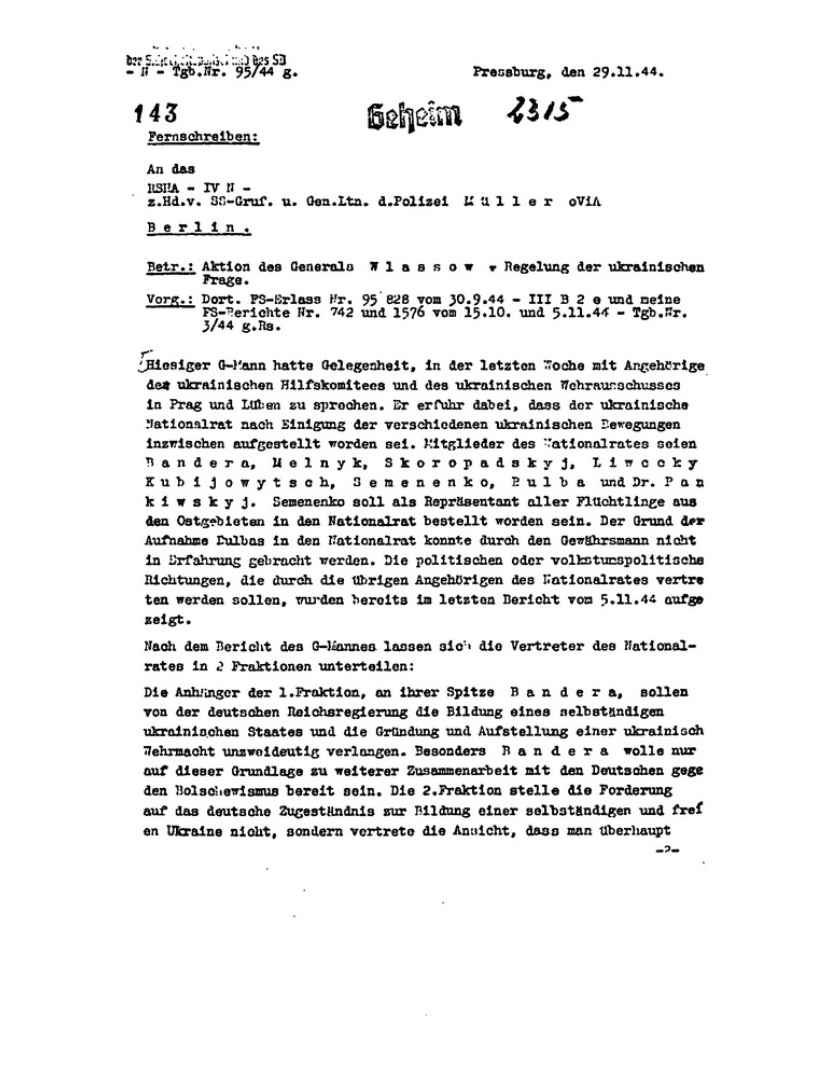
A November 1944 report of Pressburg SD to Gestapo chief Heinrich Müller, informing him about the creation of the Ukrainian National Committee

Suffering from manpower shortages, a group of Nazi Party officials and SS officers endeavoured to set up the Ukrainian National Committee (UNC) to negotiate and coordinate support for the retreating German forces in return for political concessions. A broad spectrum of imprisoned Ukrainian nationalist leaders were subsequently released and taken to Berlin, including Melnyk and the OUN(m) leadership in October 1944. According to the OUN(m)'s internal documentation, 43 Melnykites were released, Petro Voinovsky, Osyp Boidunyk, Provid member Dmytro Andriievsky, and OUN press chief Volodymyr Martynets among them, while a further 179 remained in various prisons and concentration or labour camps. Having failed to locate Bandera's proposed candidate for negotiations, SS-Obersturmbannführer Fritz Arlt turned to Melnyk who was successful in negotiating a common stance among Ukrainian nationalists, including the monarchist Hetmanites under Pavlo Skoropadskyi, the socialist Petliurites under Mykola Livytskyi, and the OUN(b) under Bandera.

In response to a proclamation by Andrey Vlasov's Committee for the Liberation of the Peoples of Russia (KONR) claiming to represent all peoples of the Soviet Union, Melnyk signed a petition composed by ten non-Russian national political groups on behalf of Ukrainian nationalists, appealing to Alfred Rosenberg who subsequently sent a protest to Adolf Hitler concerning Vlasov's committee. In concert with the UNC, Melnyk prepared a declaration pledging the establishment of a Ukrainian state, calling for no subordination to Vlasov's KONR, and demanding that the SS Galicia Division form the basis of a Ukrainian army, while also preparing concessions that would have seen Galicia remain in the German sphere of influence. Though Nazi officials nominally granted the demand for a Ukrainian National Army, the nationalists' demand for statehood was rejected. Ukrainian collaborationist military units were to be transferred to the command of the UNC and consolidated into one formation whereby the ULS was merged into the SS Galicia Division in March 1945. Two-thirds of the legion initially attempted to defect to the Serbian nationalist Chetniks, being granted full amnesty on their return but for the leader of the desertion. Historian Paweł Markiewicz posits that Ukrainian nationalists engaged with this process in spite of Nazi Germany's bleak strategic position in late 1944 in the hopes of strengthening their émigré bases with there being over two million Ukrainians under German control at the time, including over a million Ostarbeiter.

Dissatisfied with the progress and value of these negotiations, Melnyk and his supporters withdrew from the committee and instead organised a meeting in Berlin in January whereupon it was decided that OUN(m) members would meet the Allied advance and seek to familiarise the Western Allies with the Ukrainian independence movement. Melnyk, Andriievsky, and Boidunyk left Berlin for Bad Kissingen in February with the town occupied by American troops on 7 April. According to the Cultural Department of the OUN(m) and its archives, Andriievsky and Boidunyk, in coordination with Melnyk, submitted a memorandum to the U.S. military administration on 27 April, following which it was understood that displaced Ukrainians were to be afforded the right to be separated from Poles and Russians and allowed to display the blue-and yellow flag. This was general policy for displaced persons after the war. According to historian Jan-Hinnerk Antons, the Western Allies created purely Ukrainian DP camps due to the number of conflicts arising between Ukrainians and Poles and the fear that remaining mixed would hurt general repatriation efforts. (Note: According to Antons, the Western Allies didn't officially recognise a Ukrainian nationality out of fear for antagonising the USSR, with Ukrainians in the camp listed as stateless, undetermined, or other.)

John Alexander Armstrong posits that even though, "apparent to all", Nazi Germany's chances of victory on the Eastern Front had gone from remote after the Germans' failure to take Moscow to extremely remote after the 1942-1943 winter of Stalingrad, Ukrainian nationalists generally staked their strategic course on hopes that either the Western Allies would intervene in their favour or that the two superpowers would exhaust one another whereby a period of anarchy would emerge in Eastern Europe, similar to that that followed the First World War, in which an organised but contemporarily inferior nationalist military force could assert itself. According to Timothy Snyder, Banderite leaders believed that in such a scenario their chief enemy would be a resurgent Poland.

Historians Yuri Radchenko and Andrii Usach assert that for the duration of the war, even during the repressive crackdowns, the OUN(m) never abandoned its stance on collaboration with the Third Reich as a path to an independent Ukrainian state whereby their orientation oscillated between neutrality and friendship. Radchenko estimates that between several hundred and one thousand OUN(m) members were killed by the Nazis over the course of the conflict.

== Post-WWII and the Cold War era ==
The OUN(m) distributed anonymous pamphlets as early as 1946 in west German Ukrainian displaced persons (DP) camps that sought to revise the history of the war into a nationalist propagandist narrative, exclusively victimising and lionising the organisation for the brutal repression many of its members endured and glossing over its complicity in war crimes and much of its collaboration with the Nazis, thus developing a martyrology. Historian Yuri Radchenko asserts that such efforts were instrumental in popularising myths surrounding the OUN(m) in the diaspora and newly independent Ukraine. The DP camps became hotbeds of nationalist sentiment with the OUN(m) holding events to honour Stsiborskyi and Senyk for their role in the 'independence struggle', though this garnered controversy in the Ukrainian DP press. The split in the OUN persisted with the OUN(b) engaging in an uncompromising effort to control most of the DP camps, especially those in the British occupation zone, (Note: According to historian Jan-Hinnerk Antons, this was due to the demographics of the OUN(b)'s base and the concentration of intellectuals in the American occupation zone.) while the OUN(m) continued to work with the pluralistic Central Representation of the Ukrainian Emigration in Germany— the camps also tended to be socially segregated along factional lines and historian Jan-Hinnerk Antons notes an account of a young girl being forbidden from submitting a poem at an OUN(m) commemorative event by her Banderite father.

The OUN(m) in the postwar years reoriented to an ideology of conservative corporatism, sometimes going by the name 'OUN Solidarists' (OUN-s) and discarding many of its prior fascist elements at its Third Great Congress held on 30 August 1947 whereby the leader was to be held accountable by a congress every three years and the principles of freedom of conscience, press, speech, and political opposition introduced. Osyp Boidunyk became the chief theorist of the OUN(m), publishing National Solidarity in 1945 that, according to historian Georgiy Kasianov, was largely a reformulation of Mykola Stsiborskyi's Natsiokratiia published ten years prior.

The OUN(m) was instrumental in reorganising the government of the Ukrainian People's Republic in exile whereby an effort was made to consolidate Ukrainian émigré organisations in Europe under the legislative Ukrainian National Council (UNRada), reconstituted in 1948. However, the Union of Hetman Statesmen opposed the associations with the Ukrainian People's Republic (UPR) and the OUN(b) left in 1950 having unsuccessfully argued for a larger role for the Ukrainian Supreme Liberation Council (the political leadership of the UPA) and recognition of the scale of its support relative to the other factions. The OUN(m) withdrew from the UNRada in October 1957, rejoining in 1961. Melnyk contributed a collection of eulogies of OUN and OUN(m) members Yevhen Konovalets, Oleh Olzhych, Omelian Senyk, Roman Sushko, Mykola Stsiborskyi, and Yaroslav Baranovsky (Note: In a postword, Melnyk notes that eulogies of Orest Chemerynskyi-Orshan and Viktor Kurmanovych among others remained uncompleted.) to a 1954 book marking the 25th anniversary of the creation of the OUN.

Following an address to the Ukrainian National Federation of Canada in May 1957, Melnyk began to actively lobby the Ukrainian diaspora for the establishment of a pan-Ukrainian umbrella organisation capable of accommodating the fragmented landscape of diaspora organisations. On 6 April 1958, Melnyk delivered a speech at the IX Congress of the Ukrainian National Alliance in France (UNE) in Paris that was also published in Ukrainske slovo (Paris) commemorating the 40th anniversary of the declaration of Ukrainian independence and rallying readers and listeners to contribute to the founding of a "World Union of Ukrainians". This was later realised after Melnyk's death with the founding of the World Congress of Free Ukrainians (WCFU) in 1967.

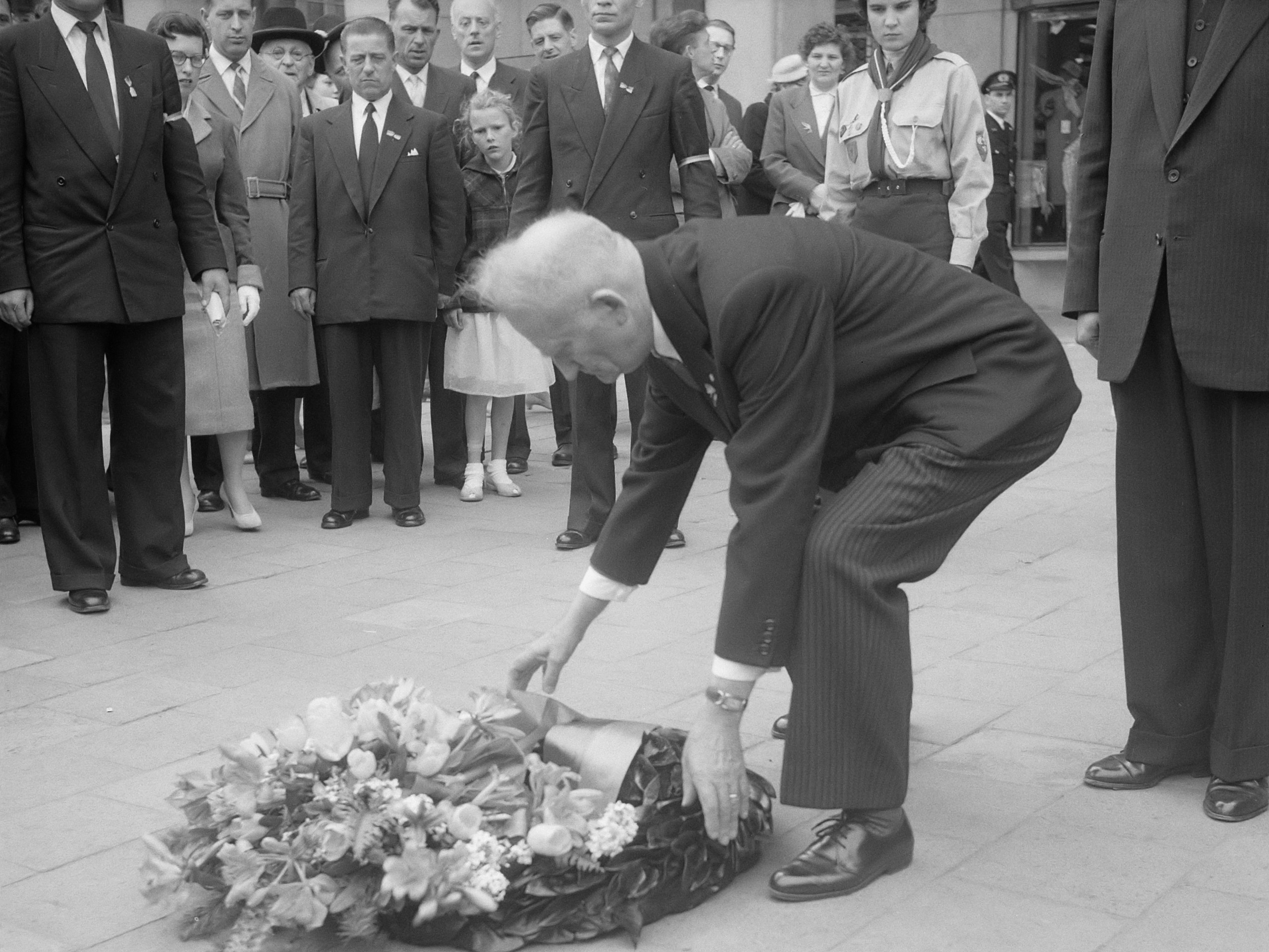
Melnyk placing a wreath at the site of Konovalets's assassination, Rotterdam 1958

Ukrainske slovo was reconstituted and again published out of Paris from 1948 onwards while the OUN(m) began publishing Surma as a newspaper in the 1980s. Leaders of the OUN(m) and OUN(b), including Melnyk, Bandera, Stetsko, Kapustiansky, and Andriievsky, attended a ceremony at Konovalets's grave in Rotterdam on 23 May 1958 to mark the 20th anniversary of his assassination. At its Seventh Great Congress in 1970, the OUN(m) rejected exclusivist revolutionary nationalism and embraced political pluralism, declaring itself to be a defender of democratic principles. After Melnyk's death in 1964, leadership of the PUN passed on to Oleh Shtul (1964-1977), Denys Kvitkovsky (1977-1979), and Mykola Plaviuk (1981-2012).

Mykola Plaviuk, a leading figure in the OUN(m), was nominated as president of the WCFU in 1973, precipitating a crisis with the OUN(b) and UPR in exile though a compromise was secured by Metropolitans Maxim Hermaniuk and Mstyslav Skrypnyk where Plaviuk instead assumed the position of deputy to Father Wasyl Kushnir. To avoid further conflict, the next term was to be divided between Plaviuk and OUN(b) member Ivan Bazarko, switching between the positions of deputy and president. However, another crisis emerged when Plaviuk was elected head of the OUN(m) in 1979 while also holding the position of President of the WCFU, violating a founding resolution of the WCFU. As a result, Plaviuk assumed the position of leader of the OUN(m) only after his term had ended in 1981. He later became President of the UPR in exile in 1989.

According to declassified CIA reports from 1952 and 1977, the less intellectual and "radically outmoded" Banderite émigré organisations struggled to build influence on the ground in the Ukrainian SSR whereas Melnykite organisations would go on to establish contacts with Ukrainian dissidents and publish dissident works such as the Chornovil Papers in 1968 and five volumes of The Ukrainian Herald. According to political scientist and historian Georgiy Kasianov, during perestroika in the late 1980s nationalist émigré groups exported a cultural memory to Soviet Ukraine of the OUN as 'freedom fighters against two totalitarian regimes', leading to the proliferation of memory politics in independent Ukraine— though these efforts principally concerned the rehabilitation and enobling of Bandera, the OUN(b), and the UPA given that they best embodied this historical narrative.

== Post-Soviet Ukraine ==
Myroslav Yurkevich, of the Canadian Institute of Ukrainian Studies, wrote in the third volume of the Encyclopedia of Ukraine published in 1993: "The power and influence of the OUN factions have been declining steadily, because of assimilatory pressures, ideological incompatibility with the Western liberal-democratic ethos, and the increasing tendency of political groups in Ukraine to move away from integral nationalism." At the time, pro-Melnykite organisations that existed in the diaspora included the Ukrainian National Federation of Canada, the Organisation for the Rebirth of Ukraine (ODVU) in the United States, the Union for Agricultural Education in Brazil, the Vidrodzhennia society in Argentina, the Ukrainian National Alliance in France, and the Federation of Ukrainians in the United Kingdom.

That year, the OUN(m) (Note: Having retained the name the 'Organisation of Ukrainian Nationalists'.) registered in Ukraine as a non-governmental organisation, (Note: According to historian Andrew Wilson, the OUN factions were wary of openly engaging in political activity due to the dominance of the Communist Party in public political life.) adopting a national democratic programme at its May 1993 XII Great Congress held in Irpin. (Note: Wilson asserts that the OUN(m) congress was less influential than those of the richer and better organised Banderite Congress of Ukrainian Nationalists, which held two congresses in 1992 and 1993.) In its programme, the OUN(m) stated:

"The nature and fate of Ukrainian statehood will depend on how quickly the ideology of the Nationalist movement will be propagated within all strata of Ukrainian society."

Though its adherents claimed to oppose authoritarianism, xenophobia, and chauvinism, according to political scientist Vyacheslav Shved moderate nationalists, including the OUN(m), assumed a paternalistic attitude toward Ukraine's minorities under the assumption that ethnic Ukrainians should be granted special status, responsibilities, and rights. The OUN(m) backed the Ukrainian Republican Party, having supported its predecessor the Ukrainian Helsinki Union. The OUN(m) styled itself as the "maternal OUN", claiming direct lineage to the original organisation.

In 1992, the OUN(m)-affiliated Federation of Ukrainians in the United Kingdom transferred its building at 78 Kensington Park Road to the newly established Embassy of Ukraine in London in return for a building in Kyiv being made available to the Oleh Olzhych Foundation which was established in May 1993. (Note: When the embassy moved to Holland Park in 1996 it became a consular building.) The OUN(m) subsequently set up the Olena Teliha Publishing House in Kyiv in 1994 that continues to publish Ukrainske slovo as a weekly magazine as well as the scientific journal Rozbudova derzhavy (Building the State) and a large number of Melnykite legacy works and memoirs. Historians Yuri Radchenko and Andrii Usach asserted in a 2020 journal article that the contemporary OUN(m) press "frequently scrubbed the history of the OUN(m) as a whole and of the [Ukrainian Legion of Self-Defense] in particular". The Oleh Olzhych Foundation cofounded the Oleh Olzhych Library in 1994 with the M.S. Hrushevsky Institute of Ukrainian Archeography and Source Studies of the National Academy of Sciences of Ukraine which preserves the archives of the OUN(m).

In May 2006, President Viktor Yushchenko issued a presidential decree to mark the 100th birthday of Olena Teliha by erecting a memorial to "her and her associates" at Babyn Yar, though this was later abandoned by his successor. In late 2006, and as a result of a meeting between Mykola Plaviuk and administration officials, Lviv City Council announced plans to transfer the tombs of Andriy Melnyk, Yevhen Konovalets, Stepan Bandera and other key leaders of the OUN and UPA to a new area of Lychakiv Cemetery specifically dedicated to the Ukrainian national liberation struggle, though this was not implemented. In mid-2007, the National Bank of Ukraine released two commemorative coins for OUN(m) members Teliha and Oleh Olzhych.

In March 2010, the Kyiv Post reported that the OUN(m) rejected Yulia Tymoshenko's calls to unite "all of the national patriotic forces" under the Yulia Tymoshenko Bloc against President Viktor Yanukovych. In a statement, the OUN(m) demanded that Yanukovych reject the idea of cancelling the Hero of Ukraine titles awarded to Bandera and Roman Shukhevych and that he continue recognising fighters for Ukraine's independence, launched by Yushchenko, and posthumously award Hero of Ukraine status to Yevhen Konovalets and Symon Petliura. According to Oleksandr Kucheruk, the director of the Oleh Olzhych Library, OUN(m) members participated in the Orange Revolution and the Revolution of Dignity.

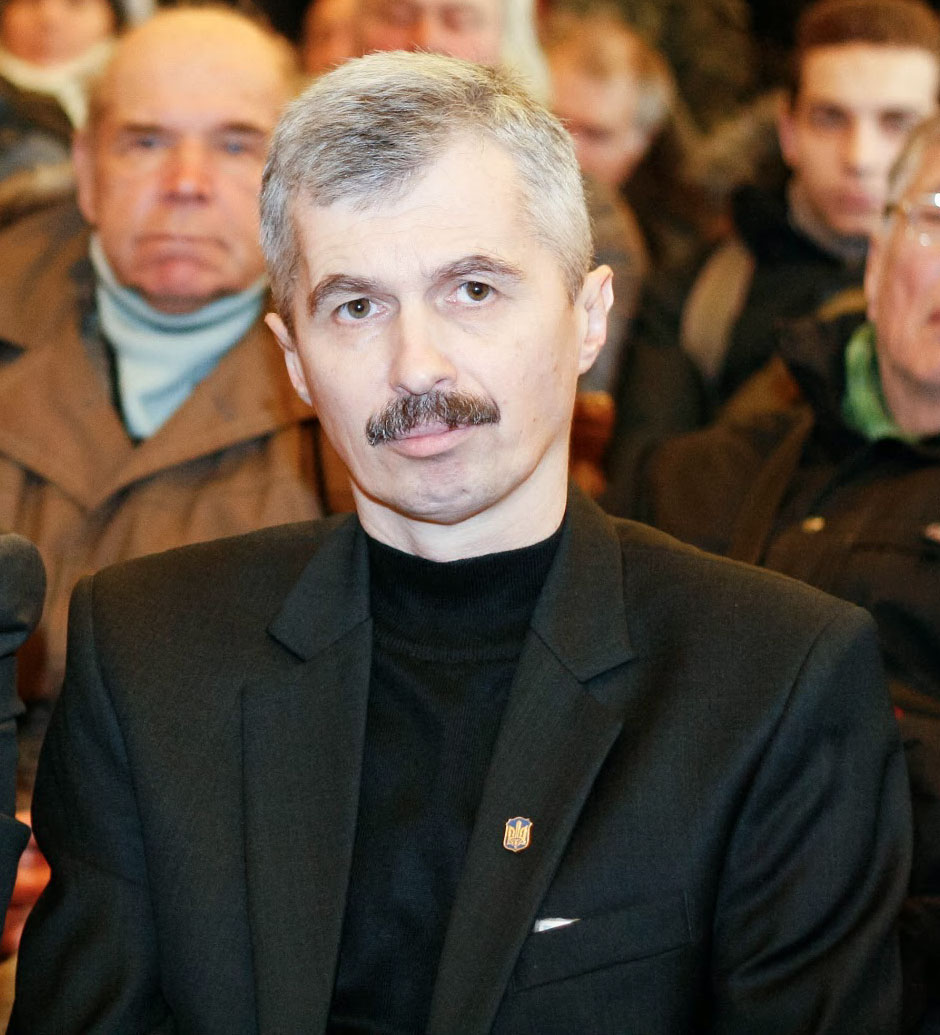
Chervak in 2014

After Plaviuk's death in 2012, leadership of the PUN and OUN(m) passed on to Ukrainian activist and historian Bohdan Chervak [ukr] who was appointed by President Petro Poroshenko in 2015 as First Deputy Head of the State Committee for Television and Radio-broadcasting. In his address to the XXI Great Congress of Ukrainian Nationalists in May 2016, Chervak celebrated OUN(m) activists' successes in "[pressuring]" local authorities to erect a memorial plaque to Stsiborskyi and Senyk and a monument to Olzhych, unveiled in 2017, in Zhytomyr as well as a monument to Melnyk, unveiled in 2017, in Ivano-Frankivsk and a portrait of Teliha in the National Writers' Union building in Kyiv. A member of the OUN(m) had been elected Chairman of the National Writers' Union in 2014, retaining the position as of December 2024.

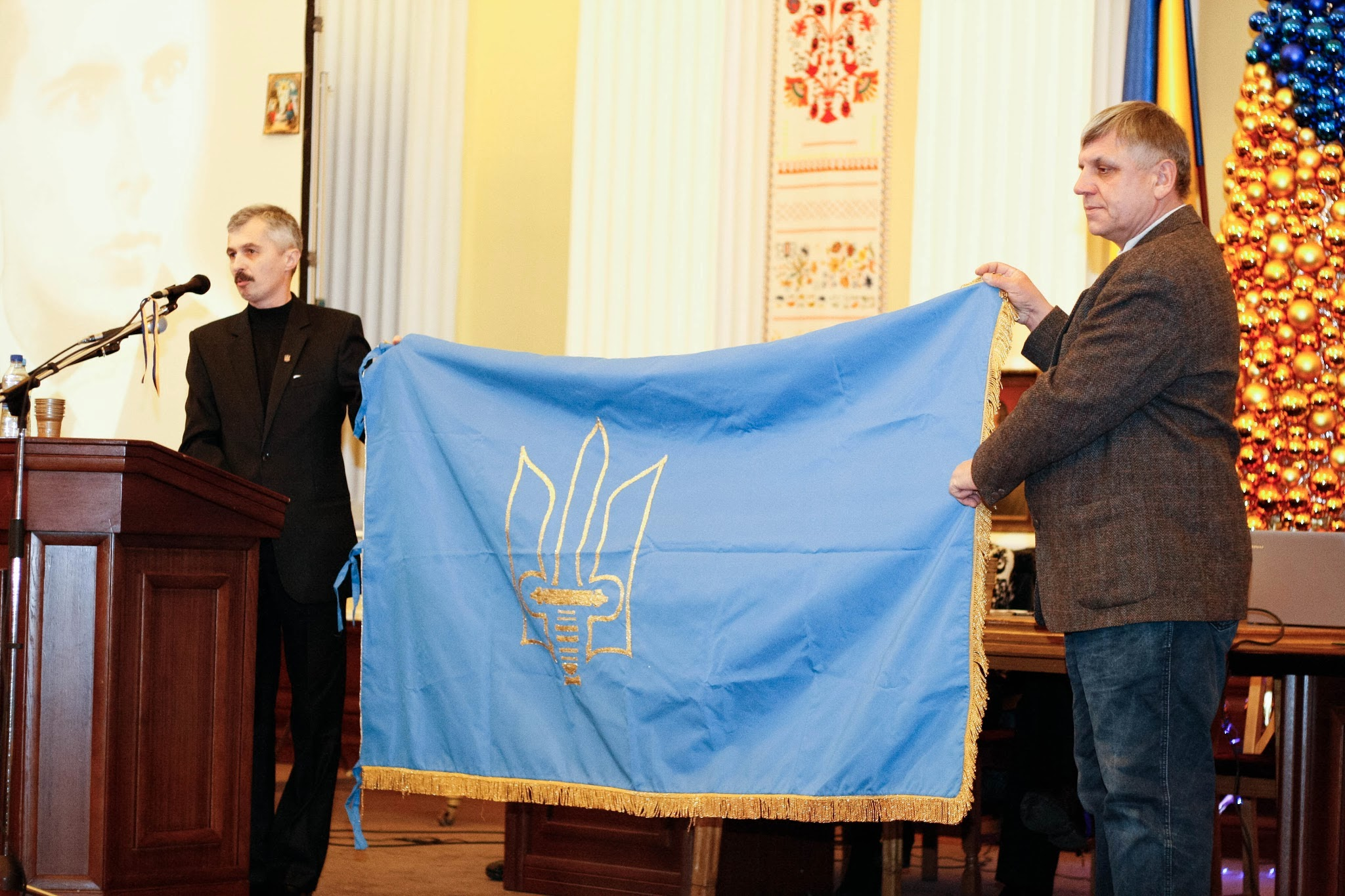
Chervak (left) at the first Bandera Readings [ukr] [de] in Kyiv, 2014

In March 2017, the OUN(m) signed the National Manifesto [ukr] alongside a number of far-right organisations operating in Ukraine. That year, Chervak was appointed by Poroshenko to the planning committee for the development of the site of Babyn Yar alongside Volodymyr Viatrovych and Jewish community leaders, subsequently criticising plans to build a Holocaust museum there on the grounds that there was inadequate recognition of OUN members killed by the Nazis, writing in a Facebook post:

"Do these people realise that Babyn Yar is also the place that is inseparable from the historical memory of the Ukrainian nation? It is here where the memory of the OUN groups and of Olena Teliha is preserved."

In November 2018, Chervak, acting on behalf of the OUN(m) and together with Right Sector, C14, and the Banderite Congress of Ukrainian Nationalists (KUN) party, endorsed Ruslan Koshulynskyi in the 2019 Ukrainian presidential election. In the 2019 Ukrainian parliamentary election, the OUN(m) joined the far-right Svoboda bloc with Chervak running as the bloc's 49th party list candidate, though it later received 2.15% of the vote, below the 5% threshold needed for party list candidates to begin to be awarded seats based on proportional representation. Koshulynskyi received 1.6% of the presidential vote. At its XXII Great Congress in September 2020, held in Kyiv, the OUN(m) stated in its declaration:

"The nation is the highest form of human community, which arises naturally as a result of the ethnic structuring of humanity. Thanks to the nation, an individual overcomes the limitations of their existence in time and space, spiritually uniting with the "dead, living, and unborn" representatives of the nation throughout all time and space of its being. The OUN considers the values formulated here as the highest in its hierarchical system, that is, it places them above any partial, narrowly party, temporary interests. Our political position is to rise above parties, placing national and state interests above all else."

In July 2025, Chervak submitted an appeal on behalf of the OUN(m) to Oleksandr Alfiorov, the newly appointed head of the Ukrainian Institute of National Memory, lobbying him to a submit a draft law to the Verkhovna Rada recognising modern Ukraine as a successor state to the Ukrainian People's Republic on the basis of countering Russian disinformation.

== Bibliography ==
- Altman, Ilya (2002). Zhertvy nenavisti: kholokost v Rossii 1941-1945 gg [Victims of Hatred: The Holocaust in the USSR, 1941-1945] (in Russian). Moscow: Ark Foundation. ISBN 978-589-048-110-8.
- Armstrong, John (1963). Ukrainian Nationalism (2nd ed.). New York: Columbia University Press.
- Armstrong, John A. (1968). "Collaborationism in World War II: The Integral Nationalist Variant in Eastern Europe". The Journal of Modern History. 40 (3): 396–410. doi:10.1086/240210. JSTOR 1878147. S2CID 144135929.
- Berkhoff, Karel C.; Carynnyk, Marco (1999). "The Organization of Ukrainian Nationalists and Its Attitude toward Germans and Jews: Iaroslav Stets'ko's 1941 Zhyttiepys". Harvard Ukrainian Studies. 23 (3): 149–184.
- Berkhoff, Karel C. (2004). Harvest of Despair: Life and Death in Ukraine under Nazi Rule. Cambridge, MA; London: Harvard University Press; Belknap Press. doi:10.2307/j.ctv1p6hnvg. ISBN 978-0-674-01313-1. JSTOR j.ctv1p6hnvg.
- Berkhoff, Karel C.; Abakunova, Anna; Dean, Martin; Dieckmann, Christoph; Dumitru, Diana; Feferman, Kiril; Hrynevych, Vladyslav; Khiterer, Victoria; Kruglov, Alexander; Pohl, Dieter; Quinkert, Babette; Radchenko, Yuri; Rebrova, Irina; Struve, Kai; Titarenko, Dmitrii; Umansky, Andrej (2018). Basic Historical Narrative of the Babyn Yar Holocaust Memorial Center (PDF) (Report). Kyiv: Foundation and Babyn Yar Holocaust Memorial Center.
- Bruder, Franziska (2007). "Den ukrainischen Staat erkämpfen oder sterben!" Die Organisation ukrainischer Nationalisten (OUN) 1929–1948 ["Fight for the Ukrainian State or Die!" The Organisation of Ukrainian Nationalists (OUN) 1929–1948] (in German). Berlin: Metropol Verlag.
- Carynnyk, Marco (2011). "Foes of our rebirth: Ukrainian nationalist discussions about Jews, 1929–1947". Nationalities Papers. 39 (3): 315–352. doi:10.1080/00905992.2011.570327.
- Erlacher, Trevor (2021). Ukrainian Nationalism in the Age of Extremes: An Intellectual Biography of Dmytro Dontsov. Cambridge, MA: Harvard University Press. doi:10.2307/j.ctv2d8qwsn. ISBN 978-067-425-093-2. JSTOR j.ctv2d8qwsn.
- Gedz, Vitaliy (2009). "Hazety «Ukrainske Slovo» ta «Nove Ukrainske Slovo» yak dzherelo z istorii Ukrainy periodu Druhoi svitovoi viiny (zhovten 1941 - veresen 1943 rr.)" [Newspapers "Ukrainian Word" and "New Ukrainian Word" as a source on the history of Ukraine during the Second World War (October 1941 — September 1943)] (PDF). Dissertation for an Academic Degree; Candidate of Historical Sciences (in Ukrainian). Taras Shevchenko National University of Kyiv.
- Gomza, Ivan (2015). "Elusive Proteus: A study in the ideological morphology of the Organization of Ukrainian Nationalists". Communist and Post-Communist Studies. 48 (2–3): 195–207. doi:10.1016/j.postcomstud.2015.06.005 – via online.ucpress.edu.
- Horelov, Mykola (1996). "Ethnocratic Concepts". In Derhachov, Oleksandr (ed.). Ukrainian Statehood in the Twentieth Century: Historical and Political Analysis. Kyiv: Political Thought. pp. 39–52. ISBN 978-966-543-040-7.
- International Military Tribunal (1947). "Trial of the Major War Criminals Before the International Military Tribunal (Volume VII)" (PDF). Nuremberg.
- Kasianov, Georgiy (2003). Do pytannia pro ideolohiiu Orhanizatsii ukrainskykh natsionalistiv (OUN): Analit. ohliad [On the Question of the Ideology of the Organisation of Ukrainian Nationalists (OUN). Analytical Review.] (in Ukrainian). Kyiv: Institute of History of Ukraine.
- Kasianov, Georgiy (2023). "Nationalist Memory Narratives and the Politics of History in Ukraine since the 1990s" (PDF). Nationalities Papers. 52 (6). Cambridge University Press.
- Kubijovyč, Volodymyr (1937). Atlias Ukrainy Y Sumezhnykh Kraiv [Atlas of Ukrainian and Adjacent Lands] (in Ukrainian). Lviv: Ukrainian Publishing Institute.
- Kurylo, Taras; Khymka, Ivan (2008). "How did the OUN treat the Jews? Reflections on the book by Volodymyr Viatrovych" (PDF). Ukraina Moderna (in Ukrainian). 13 (2): 252–265.
- Kurylo, Taras (2014). "The 'Jewish Question' in the Ukrainian Nationalist Discourse of the Inter-War Period". In Petrovsky-Shtern Y., Polonsky A. (ed.). Polin: Studies in Polish Jewry Volume 26: Jews and Ukrainians. Liverpool University Press, Littman Library of Jewish Civilisation. pp. 233–258. doi:10.2307/j.ctv2vr8vjf. ISBN 978-1-906764-19-7. JSTOR j.ctv2vr8vjf.
- Kuzio, Taras (1997). "Radical nationalist parties and movements in contemporary Ukraine before and after independence: The right and its politics, 1989-1994". Nationalities Papers. 25 (2): 211–242. doi:10.1080/00905999708408500.
- Kuzio, Taras (2001). "Identity and Nation-Building in Ukraine: Defining the 'Other'". Ethnicities. 1 (3): 343–365. doi:10.1177/146879680100100304.
- Majewski, Marcin (2005). "Przyczynek do wojennych dziejów Ukraińskiego Legionu Samoobrony (1943–1945)" [Contribution to the wartime history of the Ukrainian Self-Defense Legion (1943-1945)]. Memory and Justice (in Polish). 4 (2): 295–327.
- Markiewicz, Pawel (2018). "The Ukrainian Central Committee, 1940-1945: A case of collaboration in Nazi-occupied Poland". PhD diss., Jagiellonian University.
- Motyka, Grzegorz (2006). Ukraińska partyzantka 1942-1960: Działalność Organizacji Ukraińskich Nacjonalistów i Ukraińskiej Powstańczej Armii [Ukrainian Partisans 1942–1960: Activities of the Organisation of Ukrainian Nationalists and the Ukrainian Insurgent Army] (PDF) (in Polish). Warsaw: Rytm. ISBN 978-8-3679-2737-6.
- Rabotyazhev, Nikolay V. (2020). "Pravy radikalizm na Ukraine: istoriya i sovremennost" [Far-right Radicalism in Ukraine in Past and Present]. Post-Soviet Issues (in Russian). 7 (4): 516–531. doi:10.24975/2313-8920-2020-7-4-516-531.
- Radchenko, Yuri; Usach, Andrii (2020). ""For the Eradication of Polish and Jewish-Muscovite Rule in Ukraine": An Examination of the Crimes of the Ukrainian Legion of Self-Defense". Holocaust and Genocide Studies. 34 (3): 450–477. doi:10.1093/hgs/dcaa056.
- Radchenko, Yuri (26 April 2023). "«Padaiut v bratni mohyly... chleny Orhanizatsii ukrainskykh natsionalistiv»: natsystski represii proty melnykivtsiv (1941–1944 rr.). Chastyna 1" ["They Fall into Mass Graves... Members of the Organisation of Ukrainian Nationalists": Nazi Repressions Against the Melnykites (1941–1944). Part 1]. Ukraina Moderna (in Ukrainian).
- Radchenko, Yuri (8 May 2023). "«Padaiut v bratni mohyly... chleny Orhanizatsii ukrainskykh natsionalistiv»: natsystski represii proty melnykivtsiv (1941–1944 rr.). Chastyna 2" ["They Fall into Mass Graves... Members of the Organisation of Ukrainian Nationalists": Nazi Repressions Against the Melnykites (1941–1944). Part 2]. Ukraina Moderna (in Ukrainian).
- Radchenko, Yuri (8 June 2023). "«Padaiut v bratni mohyly... chleny Orhanizatsii ukrainskykh natsionalistiv»: natsystski represii proty melnykivtsiv (1941–1944 rr.). Chastyna 3" ["They Fall into Mass Graves... Members of the Organisation of Ukrainian Nationalists": Nazi Repressions Against the Melnykites (1941–1944). Part 3]. Ukraina Moderna (in Ukrainian).
- Radchenko, Yuri (22 June 2023). "«Padaiut v bratni mohyly... chleny Orhanizatsii ukrainskykh natsionalistiv»: natsystski represii proty melnykivtsiv (1941–1944 rr.). Chastyna 4" ["They Fall into Mass Graves... Members of the Organisation of Ukrainian Nationalists": Nazi Repressions Against the Melnykites (1941–1944). Part 4]. Ukraina Moderna (in Ukrainian).
- Rossoliński-Liebe, Grzegorz (2011). "The "Ukrainian National Revolution" of 1941: Discourse and Practice of a Fascist Movement". Kritika: Explorations in Russian and Eurasian History. 12 (1): 83–114. doi:10.1353/kri.2011.a411661.
- Rossoliński-Liebe, Grzegorz (2014). Stepan Bandera: The Life and Afterlife of a Ukrainian Nationalist. Fascism, Genocide, and Cult. Stuttgart: Ibidem Press. ISBN 978-3-8382-0604-2.
- Rudling, Per Anders (2011a). "The OUN, the UPA and the Holocaust: A Study in the Manufacturing of Historical Myths". The Carl Beck Papers in Russian and East European Studies. 2107. Pittsburgh: University Center for Russian and East European Studies.
- Rudling, Per Anders (2011b). "Terror and Local Collaboration in Occupied Belarus: The Case of Schutzmannschaft Battalion 118. Part I: Background". Historical Yearbook. VIII. Bucharest: Romanian Academy: 195–214.
- Shkandrij, Myroslav (2015). "National democracy, the OUN, and Dontsovism: Three ideological currents in Ukrainian Nationalism of the 1930s–40s and their shared myth-system". Communist and Post-Communist Studies. 48 (2–3): 209–216. doi:10.1016/j.postcomstud.2015.06.002. JSTOR 48610448.
- Shved, Vyacheslav (1994). "The Conceptual Approaches of Ukrainian Political Parties to Ethno-Political Problems in Independent Ukraine". Journal of Ukrainian Studies. 19 (2).
- Siemaszko, Władysław; Siemaszko, Ewa (1998). "Terror ukraiński i zbrodnie przeciwko ludzkości dokonane przez OUN-UPA na ludności polskiej na Wołyniu w latach 1939-1945" [Ukrainian terror and crimes against humanity performed by the OUN-UPA on the Polish people in Volhynia in the years 1939-1945]. Polish Studies (in Polish). 19: 91–106.
- Snyder, Timothy (2003). The Reconstruction of Nations: Poland, Ukraine, Lithuania, Belarus, 1569-1999. New Haven: Yale University Press. ISBN 978-030-012-841-3.
- Starodubets, Galyna (2012). "Subiekty ukrainskoho natsionalnoho rukhu oporu v 1942 rotsi. Dylema vyboru" [Subjects of the Ukrainian national resistance movement in 1942. The dilemma of choice]. Ukraine: Cultural Heritage, National Consciousness, Statehood (in Ukrainian) (22). Ivan Krypyakevych Institute of Ukrainian Studies, National Academy of Sciences of Ukraine: 128–140.
- Struve, Kai (2012). "Rites of Violence? The Pogroms of Summer 1941". In Bartal I.; Polonsky A.; Ury S. (eds.). Polin: Studies in Polish Jewry Volume 24: Jews and their Neighbours in Eastern Europe since 1750. Liverpool University Press, Littman Library of Jewish Civilisation.
- Umland, Andreas (2020). Ukraine's Far Right Today (PDF) (Report). Swedish Institute of International Affairs. p. 4. "OUN: Orhanizatsiia ukrainskykh natsionalistiv (Organization of Ukrainian Nationalists);"
- Vakhnyanin, Anna (2022). "Konsolidatsiini protsesy v ukrainskii diaspori: diialnist Panamerykanskoi Ukrainskoi Konferentsii (1947–1967 rr.)" [Consolidation Processes in the Ukrainian Diaspora: The Activities of the Pan-American Ukrainian Conference (1947–1967)]. Proceedings of History Faculty of Lviv University (in Ukrainian) (23). Ivan Franko National University of Lviv: 107–119. doi:10.30970/fhi.2022.22-23.3600.
- Vakhnyanin, Anna (2024). "Svitovyi kongres vilnykh ukraintsiv: kryzy ta shliakhy yikh podolannia" [World Congress of Free Ukrainians: Crises and ways to overcome them]. Ethnographic Notebooks (in Ukrainian). 1 (175): 76–82.
- Wilson, Andrew (1996). Ukrainian Nationalism in the 1990s: A Minority Faith. Cambridge: Cambridge University Press. ISBN 978-052-157-457-0.
- Wysocki, Roman (2003). Organizacja ukraińskich nacjonalistów w Polsce w latach 1929–1939: geneza, struktura, program, ideologia [The Organisation of Ukrainian Nationalists in Poland in 1929–1939: Genesis, Structure, Programme, Ideology] (in Polish). Lublin: UMCS Publishing House.
- Zaitsev, Oleksandr (2014). "Ukrainskyi intehralnyi natsionalizm (1920–1930-ti roky): heneza, evoliutsiia, porivnialnyi analiz" [Ukrainian integral nationalism (1920s–1930s): Genesis, evolution, comparative analysis] (PDF) (in Ukrainian). PhD diss., National Academy of Sciences of Ukraine. Archived from the original on 14 September 2024.
- Zaitsev, Oleksandr (2015). "Fascism or ustashism? Ukrainian integral nationalism of the 1920s–1930s in comparative perspective". Communist and Post-Communist Studies. 48 (2–3): 183–193. doi:10.1016/j.postcomstud.2015.06.009.
- Zaitsev, Oleksandr (2021). "Integral Nationalism in the Absence of a Nation-State". In Bresciani, Marco (ed.). Conservatives and Right Radicals in Interwar Europe. Abingdon, Oxfordshire: Routledge. pp. 118–142.
