= Stepan Sosnovy =

Stepan Mykolayovych Sosnovy (March 23, 1896, in Sivaske (now Сиваське), Russian Empire - March 26, 1961, in Kiev, Ukrainian SSR) was a Ukrainian-Soviet agronomist and economist and author of the first comprehensive study of the 1932-1933 Holodomor in Ukraine.

== Life ==
Born in 1896 in a farming family. Together with his younger brother Timofei (Timothy during his later life in the US) he was orphaned at the age of 9. Thanks to the guardians, he enrolled in and graduated from the Kharkov Institute of Agriculture and Forestry as an agronomist.

In the inter-war period, he published several statistical works, which mainly discussed issues of land plot lease in the Ukrainian SSR. At the beginning of 1932, he was accused of having "anti-Marxist prejudices" and "stirring up pro-Kulak sentiments", after which he was forced to quit his job.

In 1932-1936 he worked as an agronomist in Yakymivka District, Zaporizhia Oblast, where he witnessed the mass famine (later known as Holodomor) and later claimed that he had developed an anti-Soviet sentiments just at that time.

In September 1941, he was offered a job in Moscow, but he declined and stayed in Kharkov, which was occupied shortly thereafter by the German troops, together with his two sons, his mother-in-law and his sick wife. At the end of November 1941 he was unemployed. On November 24, 1941, he got a job in the Agricultural Administration, where he worked as head of the economic statistics department. In July 1943 he visited Germany as part of a delegation of agronomists from the Kharkov region. In early August 1943, during the Soviet offensive on Kharkov, his wife moved to Kiev with their sons Vladimir (1926) and Alexander (1927). From there they moved together to the Odessa region.

From September 13, 1942, to January 24, 1943, he published 5 articles in the weekly newspaper "Novaya Ukraina" (New Ukraine) in Kharkov. The articles discussed the events of the Collectivization and the 1932 - 1933 famine. Sosnovy analyzed the nationalization process in the agricultural sector of the Ukrainian SSR and criticized the Bolshevik agricultural policy. He noted that since authorities took most of their livestock from peasants in the years of collectivization, they lost their economic independence. In analyzing the role of MTS (Machinery and Tractor Stations), S. Sosnovy showed that the creation and enforcement of these stations in Ukraine actually led to the creation of a state agricultural monopoly. Comparing statistics with other years, including the lean years, he believed that Ukraine had enough grain from the 1932 harvest to feed the population and even livestock. He noted that the excessive corn procurement plan was a killer factor for the peasants because every last grain was confiscated in order to fulfill the plan. Thanks to the use of the 1926 census data of Soviet Ukraine and a series of open statistical and economic collections from the 1930s, Sosnovy was the first Ukrainian scientist who attempted to estimate the number of victims of the famine.

In 1943–1944, his article "The Truth About the 1932-1933 Famine in Ukraine" was reprinted in several other newspapers in the occupied territories.

His younger brother Timothy (died 1983), a member of OUN-M, emigrated (Germany, later USA), where he began to teach and contribute to the dissemination of his brother's research. On 2 and 5 February 1950 S. Sosnovy's work was reprinted by the emigration newspaper "Ukrainski Visti" (Ukrainian News), which appeared in the German city of Neu-Ulm for displaced persons of Ukrainian descent. In the same year, an article by S. Sosnovy on the 1932-1933 famine came out as a separate pamphlet, and in 1953 was published in English translation in the first volume of the document collection The Black Deeds of the Kremlin, along with other evidence of the mass extermination of Ukrainian peasants in the late 1920s and early 1930s.

== Postwar years ==
After the war, he worked as an agronomist and economist, without caring to conceal his name. On February 21, 1950, he was arrested by the State Security Ministry because his former Kharkov employees testified against him. He was sentenced to 25 years imprisonment in forced labor camps, with 5 years loss of rights and complete confiscation of property. He served for six years in a labor camp near Sheksna Station in Vologda Oblast. After his release he suffered a disability and settled in the village of Pavlovka, Artsyz District in the Odessa Oblast. By that time his wife Maria Derbek had died. In 1956, at the age of 62, Stepan Sosnovy concluded his second marriage, with Euphrosyne Poremska. Soon, the couple moved with one of the sons of Stepan Sosnovy to Kiev. A decision of the Supreme Council of the RSFSR of 11 April 1958 abolished the loss of rights and cleared his criminal record. He died on March 26, 1961, at the age of 66.

== Selected works ==
- Sosnovy, S. «The Truth about the Famine» in Semen Pidhainy, ed., The Black Deeds of the Kremlin: A White Book, vol. 1 (Ukrainian Association of Victims of Russian Communist Terror: Toronto, 1953): 222–225.

== Sources and bibliography ==
- http://salat.com.ua/ru/stepan-sosnovyj-kto-on/ (Russian)
- Джулай Д.«Сталін – кровожерливий пес». Унікальна історія вченого, який першим довів штучність Голодомору // Радіо «Свобода». – 22 листопада 2018. (Ukrainian)
- Кульчицький, Станіслав. Голодомор 1932—1933 рр. як геноцид: труднощі усвідомлення. Київ: Наш час, 2008. (Ukrainian)
- Салтан, Олександр. Історична цінність дослідження агронома-економіста Степана Соснового у висвітленні подій Голодомору на шпальтах газети «Нова Україна» // Міждисциплінарний часопис «Студії Голодомору / Holodomor Studies». 2018. – No. 1. (Ukrainian)
