= Mykola Velychkivsky =

Ukrainian economist, professor, and politician (1889–1976)

- Микола Величківський
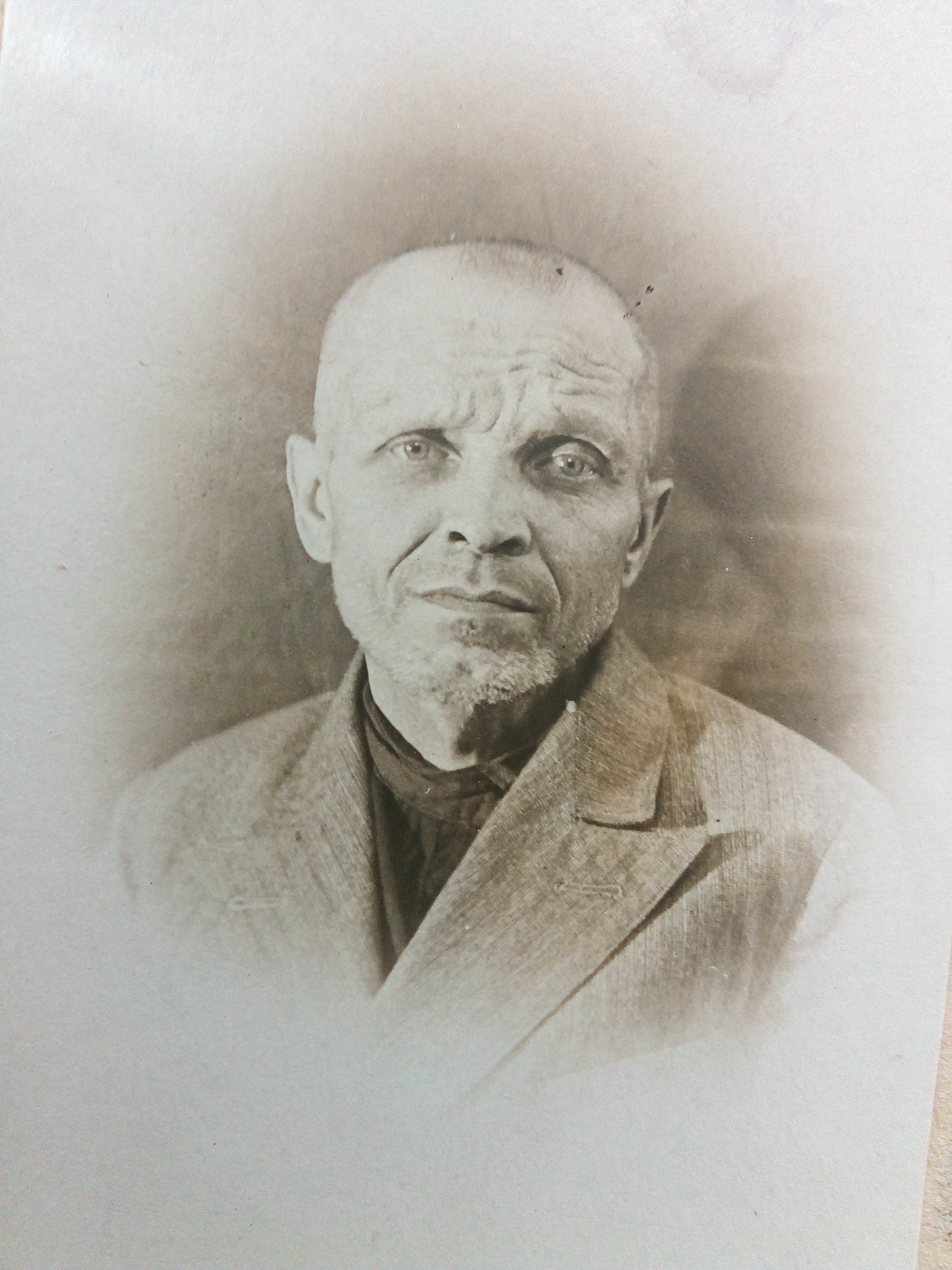
- Velychkivsky's NKVD mugshot, 1939

Chairman of the Ukrainian National Council
- In office 5 October 1941 – 1944
- Preceded by: Position established
- Succeeded by: Position abolished

Personal details
- Born: 11 January 1889 Zhytomyr, Russian Empire (now Ukraine)
- Died: 1 July 1976 (aged 87) Irvington, New York, United States
- Party: Organisation of Ukrainian Nationalists
- Other political affiliations: Union for the Liberation of Ukraine
- Education: Kiev Commercial Institute

Military service
- Allegiance: Russian Empire
- Branch/service: Imperial Russian Army
- Years of service: 1913–1917
- Battles/wars: World War I

Mykola Ivanovych Velychkivsky (Ukrainian: Мико́ла Іва́нович Величківський; 11 January 1889 – 1 July 1976) was a Ukrainian economist, professor, and politician who served as chairman of the Ukrainian National Council.

== Early life and World War I ==
He was born on 11 January 1889 (although according to his Soviet passport it was 11 January 1882), in the family of deacon Ivan Kuzmich Velychkivsky. He graduated from the three-year church-parochial school at the Kiev Dormition Church in Podil and Zhytomyr Theological School. From 1905 he studied at the Volyn Theological Seminary in Zhytomyr. In 1909 he graduated from four classes of the theological seminary and entered the Economics Department of the Kiev Commercial Institute.

In June 1913 he graduated from the Kiev Commercial Institute with the degree of Candidate of Economic Sciences.

From 1913 he served as an ensign-gunner of the 5th Artillery Brigade of the Imperial Russian Army, participating in World War I. In 1916 he graduated from the three-month school for staff of liaison officers in Kiev. In 1917 he served as a staff-captain of the 10th Siege Division in Altinovka, Chernihiv Governorate.

From September 1917 he worked as the head of the Department of the Agricultural Economy of the General Secretariat of Land Affairs of the Central Rada, and vice-director and director of the Department of the Agricultural Economy of the Ministry of Land Affairs of the Ukrainian People's Republic. In 1918, he worked in the statistical department of the cooperative committee. Then, he was again the director of the Agricultural Economy Department. Then he worked for a while as head of the department at the People's Commissioner of Land Affairs of the Ukrainian Soviet Socialist Republic and headed the subsection on the agricultural economy of the Scientific Agricultural Committee of Ukraine. During the White movement occupation of Kyiv in 1919, he joined the illegal Committee of the People's Defense of Ukraine.

== Between the wars ==
At the end of 1919 he taught economic geography in agricultural courses at the Kyiv Provincial Land Department. In 1920 he worked as the head of the Taras Shevchenko Workers' and Peasants' University in Bila Tserkva, and taught at the higher three-year pedagogical courses in Bila Tserkva. From 1924 he was the director of the Bila Tserkva Secondary Trade and Industrial Vocational School. Also from 1925 to 1927, he taught in the pedagogical and agricultural technical schools in Bila Tserkva. In June 1927 he was arrested for two weeks by the Bila Tserkva State Political Directorate. From 1927 to 1928 he worked in a lecture bureau in the city of Kyiv.

From 1928 to 1929 he was a professor and head of the Department of Agricultural Cooperation and Reconstruction of Agriculture at the Kamyanets-Podilsky Agricultural Institute. In October 1929 he was imprisoned in the Union for the Freedom of Ukraine trial and until March 1930 he was in prison in Bila Tserkva.

In 1930 he worked as the head of the educational institutions (technical colleges) of the trust of the Dnieper Electric Complexes of the People's Commissariat of Land Affairs of the Ukrainian SSR. From 1930 to 1931 he worked as a professor of Agricultural Economics and Statistics at the Zhytomyr Institute of Industrial Crops. At the same time, he was a professor and head of the Statistics Department of Lugansk Cooperative Institute.

From 1932 to 1934 he worked at the higher educational institutes of Kamianets-Podilskyi as head of the Statistics Department of the Kamyanets-Podilsky Institute of Poultry, professor of Statistics at the Institute of Technical Cultures, professor of Economic Statistics at the Pedagogical Institute, and teacher at the collective-tractor school.

In 1935–1936 he was the head of the Department of Organization of Poultry Industry Enterprise and the dean of the Zootechnical Faculty of the Rozsoshan Poultry Industry Institute of the Voronezh region of the RSFSR. From 1936 to 1937 he was the head of the department of Agricultural Economy and Organization of Agricultural Enterprise of the Azov-Black Sea Agricultural Institute in Novocherkassk. At the same time, he taught statistics at the Financial and Economic Institute of Rostov-on-Don. From 1937 to 1938 he taught accounting at the special-purpose faculty in Kyiv.

In March 1938, he was arrested by the NKVD. He was in prison until March 1939, when he was released by the decision of the Kyiv Regional Court. For some time he was treated in Kyiv and Zhytomyr and was unemployed. In August 1939, he was arrested again by the NKVD and held in prison until February 1940. For some time he worked in the library on Bay Mountain in Kyiv, and until June 1941 was an economist at a construction materials trust in Kyiv.

== World War II and later life ==
During Nazi occupation from 1941 to 1942 he was the rector of the Kyiv Polytechnic Institute, but did not actually work. He also worked as a director of the Institute of Economics, Statistics and Geography at the Ukrainian Academy of Sciences in Kyiv.

As a non-party figure, he became the chairman of the Ukrainian National Council in Kyiv, established on 5 October 1941, by the branch of the Organisation of Ukrainian Nationalists led by Andriy Melnyk. In its structure and political orientation, the Ukrainian National Council (UNС) reminded the Central Council of the times of the Ukrainian People's Republic. This symbolized the continuity of the state tradition. The UNC consisted of 130 delegates who represented all Ukrainian lands and was not a one-party formation. It was composed of members with different political positions, from Hetmanists to nationalists. The core was the presidium, which, besides Velychkivsky, included engineer Anton Baranovsky, geologist Ivan Dubina, and OUN leader Osip Boidunik.

At a press conference, together with Kyiv mayor Volodymyr Bahaziy and Melnyk they proclaimed that there was only one legal chairman of Ukraine, as well as the restoration of Ukrainian statehood, which was negatively received by the German authorities. On 6 February 1942, the Kyiv Gestapo arrested Velychkivsky, but the Reichsminster of the occupied eastern territories, Alfred Rosenberg, ordered him released from prison. From 1942 to 1943 he worked as a scientific adviser and professor of training courses at the Ukrainian Corporation (Scientific Institute of Agrarian and Agricultural Organization) in Kyiv. From 1943 he stayed illegally in Lutsk, Uman and Lviv.

In April 1944, Velychkivsky headed the updated UNC in Lviv. He was a member of the Literary and Art Club in Lviv.

In July 1944 he emigrated to Kraków and Tarnów, then moved to Bratislava and was subsequently forcibly taken to Strasshof an der Nordbahn in Austria. Until April 1945 he worked at a paint shop in Melendorf, Austria, and then moved to Germany (Aukirch and Mittenwald in Bavaria). In 1945 he became a professor and Head of Statistics at the Ukrainian Higher School of Economics in Munich and a professor at the Ukrainian Institute of Engineering and Technology in Munich.

In 1951, Velychkivsky and his wife moved to the United States and lived with their daughter Irena Karpenko in New Jersey. there, he was involved in the active intellectual life of the Shevchenko Scientific Society, studying economics and writing many reports, including "Agricultural Policy in Ukraine in the Aftermath of its Liberation from the Soviet Occupation". At the 1961 World Congress of Ukrainian Science in New York, he delivered the report "The Soviet Experiment with Agronomists". He also published a book on the destruction of agriculture by the Soviet authorities. In addition, he edited the Ukrainian Quarterly, where he published his own materials. Despite his old age, he led an active social and scientific life.

In the post-war period, he sought to bring together different factions of the Ukrainian liberation movement. Although he belonged to the Melnykite faction, he was also published in Banderite publications, for example, in the journal The Liberation Way, where, in 1965, his memoirs "The Sad Times of the German Occupation (1941–1944)" were published.

Velychkivsky died in July 1976.

== Posthumous honors ==
On 19 February 2016, the 3rd Chervonoarmeysky Lane in Zhytomyr was renamed Mykola Velichkivskyi Lane on the order of the Mayor of Zhytomyr.

== Sources ==
- Nikolay Velichkovsky. Under two occupations. Memories and documents. – SSS. New York, 2017.
- Nikolay Velichkovsky. The sad times of the German occupation in 1941–1944 // Liberation Path, London, 1965, No. 1 (203) -10 (211).
- Koval. Velichkivskyi Mykola // Encyclopedia of the History of Ukraine: in 10 volumes / edited by: VA Smoly (chairman) and others. Institute of History of Ukraine NAS of Ukraine. – K.: Sciences. Opinion, 2003. – Vol. 1: A – V. – P. 471. – 688 p. : il. – ISBN 966-00-0734-5.
- Vladimir Kosik. Ukraine during the Second World War, 1938–1945. – Kyiv – Paris – New York – Toronto, 1992.
- Gritsak Yaroslav. Essay on the history of Ukraine. Formation of the modern Ukrainian nation of the 19th–20th centuries. – K.: Genesis, 1996.
- A small dictionary of Ukrainian history / answers. ed. VA Smoly. – K.: Libid, 1997. – 464 p. – ISBN 5-325-00781-5.
