= Oleksander Ohloblyn =

Ukrainian politician and historian

Oleksandr Ohloblyn
- Олександр Оглоблин
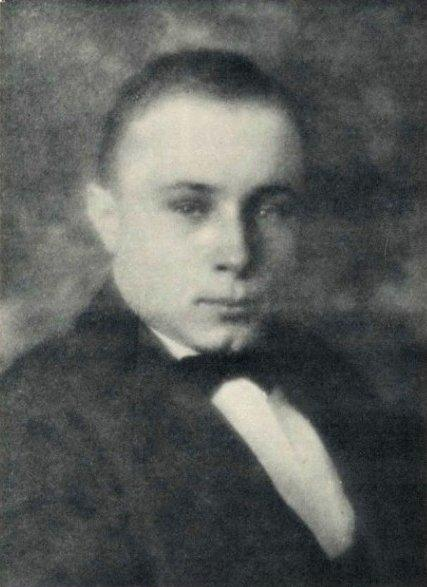
- Ohloblyn in 1922

Mayor of Kyiv (German-installed)
- In office 21 September 1941 – 25 October 1941
- Preceded by: Ivan Savvych Shevtsov (Soviet)
- Succeeded by: Volodymyr Bahaziy

Personal details
- Born: 24 November 1899 Kyiv, Russian Empire (now Ukraine)
- Died: 16 February 1992 (aged 92) Springfield, Massachusetts, U.S.
- Party: Organization of Ukrainian Nationalists (Melnykite)
- Education: Saint Vladimir Imperial University of Kyiv

Oleksander Petrovych Ohloblyn (Ukrainian: Олександр Петрович Оглоблин; 6 December 1899 – 16 February 1992) was a Ukrainian politician and historian who served as mayor of Kyiv while it was under the occupation of Nazi Germany in 1941. He was one of the most important Ukrainian émigré historians of the Cold War era.

== Life and career ==
Ohloblyn traced his ancestry to the Novhorod-Siverskyi region of eastern Ukraine, which had formed an important part of the autonomous Ukrainian Hetmanate in the seventeenth and eighteenth centuries, and throughout his professional career as a historian retained a lively interest in this area and wrote frequently about it. Educated at the universities in Kyiv, Odesa, and Moscow, from 1921 to 1933 he taught history at the Kyiv Institute of People's Education (as Kyiv University was known after the revolution), but during Joseph Stalin's purges, was dismissed from his posts, forced to recant his allegedly "bourgeois nationalist" views, and suffered repression including several months of imprisonment. In the late 1930s he returned to teaching at Kyiv and Odessa universities.

When the Germans occupied Kyiv in the autumn of 1941, Ohloblyn was appointed head of the Kyiv Municipal Council at the behest of the Organization of Ukrainian Nationalists. He held the post from 21 September to 25 October 1941. He reportedly tried to save from execution some of Jews he knew but the German commandant of Kyiv informed him that "the Jewish issue belongs to exclusive jurisdiction of Germans, and they would decide it as they pleased".

In 1942 he worked as a director of Kyiv Museum-Archive of Transitional Period, whose exhibition compared life under Bolsheviks and under Germans. In 1943 he moved to Lviv in western Ukraine and in 1944 to Prague. Upon the approach of the Red Army, he fled west to Bavaria. From 1946 to 1951, he taught at the Ukrainian Free University in Munich. In 1951, he moved to the United States where he was active in various Ukrainian émigré scholarly institutions such as the Ukrainian Academy of Arts and Sciences in the US and the Ukrainian Historical Association. From 1968 to 1970, he was a visiting professor of history at Harvard University. He died on 16 February 1992 in Ludlow, Massachusetts.

== Publications ==
During his early Soviet period, Ohloblyn authored several monographs on Ukrainian economic history (reprinted in the west in 1971 as A History of Ukrainian Industry) and began publishing on the Mazepa era of the early eighteenth century. After the war, he continued his studies of seventeenth and eighteenth century Ukraine, publishing books on the Treaty of Pereiaslav of 1654 between the Ukrainian Cossacks and the Muscovite Tsar (1954), the political elite of Left-bank Ukraine in the eighteenth century (1959), and Hetman Mazepa and his era (1960). He also published an important update to Dmytro Doroshenko's pioneering "Ukrainian Historiography" (1957).

In his various publications which appeared in the west, Ohloblyn followed his distinguished émigré predecessor, Dmytro Doroshenko, in stressing the strivings for national unity, autonomy, and independence of the Ukrainian Cossack elite and their successors, the Ukrainian gentry of Left-bank Ukraine. He greatly admired Hetman Ivan Mazepa whom, he thought well represented this trend, and who actually openly defied Moscow during the reign of Tsar Peter the Great.

In his writings on Ukrainian historiography, Ohloblyn took a moderate position, positively evaluating the work of his former opponent Mykhailo Hrushevsky, who had been severely criticisized by the generations of the 1930s and 1940s, including Doroshenko, for his ostensible undervaluing of the strivings of the Ukrainian Cossack elite for statehood and independence. Ohloblyn tried to evaluate populist Ukrainian historians like Mykola Kostomarov, Volodymyr Antonovych, and Hrushevsky within the context of their own times rather than that of the next generations which had learned new lessons about the importance of statehood from their experiences during the revolution.

== Legacy ==
Although Ohloblyn never held a tenured professorship at an American university and was largely unknown to the English speaking world, his activities in the Ukrainian Academy of Arts and Sciences and the Ukrainian Historical Association and his extensive publications in the Ukrainian language influenced younger generations of Ukrainian historians in the United States and other western countries. His students and admirers who have continued his work include Lubomyr Wynar, Orest Subtelny, and Zenon Kohut.
