= John Alexander Armstrong =

American academic

"My first publications on nationalism contained extended references to religion ... Subsequent familiarity with the impressive sociological work by Peter L. Berger and Thomas Luckmann enabled me to show more clearly how nationalism, as a type of identity, 'shelters the individual from ultimate terror', that is, death as 'the most terrifying breakdown of identity' ... In general, I share this consensus, while stipulating that nations, but no particular nation of the modern type, and certainly not nationalism existed before the 16th century. Such issues of timing and agency are very important to my theory, for my methodological preference is for intensive employment of historical data over the longue durée ... The pre-modern social formations that I treat in Nations before Nationalism (1982) and elsewhere ... require a national idea. Fundamental themes are myth, symbol, and communication, especially as they relate to boundary mechanisms of a psychological rather than territorial nature."

— Myth and Symbolism Theory of Nationalism, John A. Armstrong, 2001.

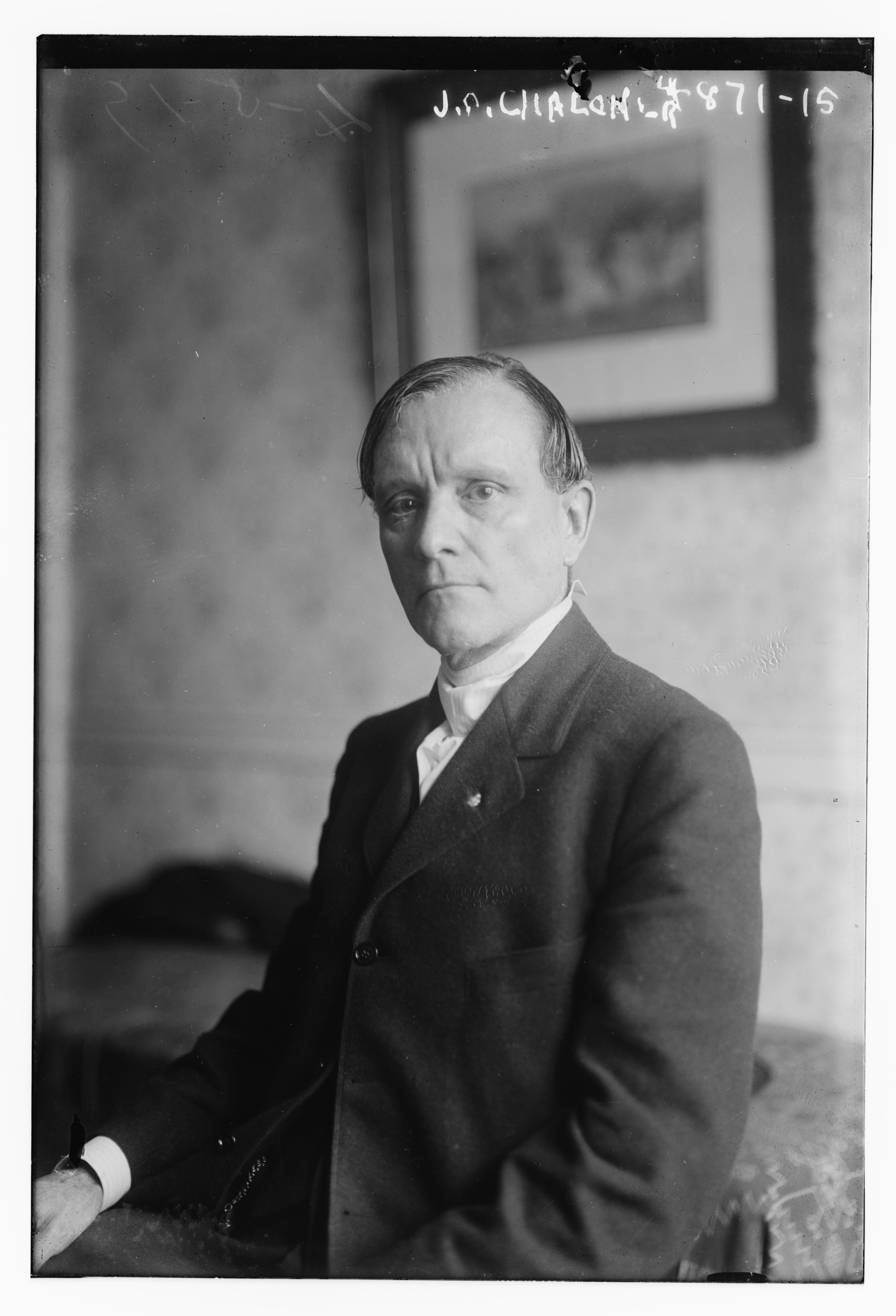
Image of John Armstrong Chaloner

John Alexander Armstrong Jr. (4 May 1922 – 2010) was Professor Emeritus of political science at the University of Wisconsin-Madison.

Born in St. Augustine, Florida on 4 May 1922, he entered the University of Chicago at age 20 where he received both bachelor's and master's degrees. However, the date of his graduation was delayed by his enlistment in the U.S. Army in Belgium during World War II, from 1944 to 1945. Such experience appears to have certain impacts upon the direction of his academic research on nationalism in Europe afterwards.

He entered Columbia University for further study in 1950 and received a Ph.D. three years later.

His earlier works focus on nationalism and ideologies in Europe, especially Ukraine and Russia during the 1950s and 1960s. The most influential work of his is the path-breaking Nations before Nationalism (1982) which firstly systematically expressed the longue durée of ethnic identity and has inspired theorists of ethnosymbolism including Anthony D. Smith.

== Selected publications ==
- (1962) Ideology, politics, and government in the Soviet Union: an introduction, British Library system no.: 011535915; 2nd ed. (1967) British Library system no.: 010265522; 4th ed. (1986), ISBN 0-8191-5405-9
- Ukrainian Nationalism 1939-1945, British Library system no.: 011535954; 2nd ed., LCCN 62-18367; 3rd ed. (1990), ISBN 0-8728-7755-8
- (1982) Nations before Nationalism, ISBN 0-8078-1501-2
