= Petro Voinovsky =

Ukrainian-American nationalist (1913–1996)

- Петро Войновський
- Born: September 8, 1913; Stanivtsi Dolishni, Austro-Hungarian Empire (now Nyzhni Stanivtsi, Ukraine)
- Died: April 8, 1996 (aged 82)
- Occupation: Ukrainian independence fighter

Petro Oleksandrovych Voinovsky (Note: Ukrainian: Петрр Олександрович Войновський, romanized: Petro Oleksandrovych Voinovskyi; Russian: Пётр Александрович Войновский, romanized: Pyotr Aleksandrovich Voynovsky; Romanian: Petru Voinovschi) (September 8, 1913 — April 8, 1996) was a Ukrainian nationalist. He lived in Bukovina (a region of modern Ukraine that belonged to Romania before 1940), served in the Romanian army in the rank of lieutenant, resigned in 1935 due to the policy of Romanianization (he refused to change his name into a Romanian one). He participated in Ukrainian scouting organization Plast, joined OUN in the 1930s. He initially supported Stepan Bandera, but later moved to Andriy Melnyk's faction. Since 1940 Voinovsky was the regional leader of OUN in Bukovina and Bessarabia.

In 1941, with German support, he organized the so-called Bukovyna Kurin (Note: Ukrainian: Буковинский курень, romanized: Bukovynskyi kuren), the Bukovinian Battalion, the biggest paramilitary unit of Andriy Melnyk's faction, got the rank of a captain (Hauptmann). When the German-Soviet war began, the Bukovyna Kurin came to Ukraine in order to organize pro-German local administration. In November 1941 his unit was merged with the Kyiv auxiliary police while Voinovsky and some other of his people were transferred to Schutzmannschaft battalions.

According to sources of Stepan Bandera's faction, Voinovsky actively helped Germans in their reprisals against Ukrainian nationalists - adherents of Bandera. Nevertheless, he was arrested by Gestapo in Lviv in 1944 and imprisoned in Brez concentration camp where he became paralyzed.

From 1949 Voinovsky resided in the USA.

After Ukraine became independent in 1991, several mass-media proclaimed Voinovsky a national hero of Ukraine. A monument in memory of Bukovyna Kurin was erected in Chernivtsi. Voinovsky visited Ukraine in 1992 and was interviewed.
