= Mykola Kapustiansky =

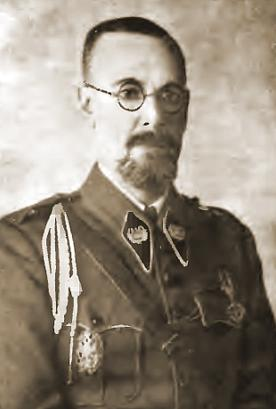
- Mykola Kapustiansky
- Born: February 1, 1879; Yekaterinoslav Governorate, Russian Empire (present-day Ukraine)
- Died: February 19, 1969 (aged 90); Munich, West Germany
- Occupation: Ukrainian National Republic army colonel

Mykola Oleksandrovych Kapustiansky (Ukrainian: Мико́ла Олекса́ндрович Капустя́нський; February 1, 1879 – February 19, 1969) was a General in the army of the Ukrainian National Republic and one of the founders of the Organization of Ukrainian Nationalists. Kapustiansky was born in Yekaterinoslav Governorate (in present-day Dnipropetrovsk Oblast) in central Ukraine, then part of the Russian Empire. He fought in the Russian-Japanese War and in 1912 graduated from the General Staff Academy in Saint Petersburg, reaching the rank of colonel during the First World War. After the Revolution of 1917 Kapustiansky joined the Ukrainian units of the Russian army and rose rapidly in its ranks, becoming chief of staff of the First Division of the First Ukrainian Corps in August 1917, and in early 1918 chief of staff of the southwestern front. Under the Directory of the Ukrainian National Republic, he served as operations chief and then as general quartermaster of the Army of the Ukrainian National Republic. In 1920, he was promoted to brigadier general.

After the war, Kapustiansky emigrated to Poland and then to France. Kapustiansky was a founder of the Organization of Ukrainian Nationalists and a member of its Provid, or Directorate, from 1929 until his death in 1969. During the rift between Andriy Melnyk and Stepan Bandera within the OUN, he took the side of the more moderate and conservative Melnyk. When the Germans occupied Ukraine during the Second World War, Kapustinsky served as vice-president of the Ukrainian National Council in Kiev but was later arrested and imprisoned by the Germans. After the war, he settled in Munich and became the first chief of the military section of the Government-in-exile of the Ukrainian National Republic. He wrote Pokhid ukraïns’kykh armii na Kyïv–Odesu v 1919 rotsi (The March of Ukrainian Armies on Kiev–Odessa in 1919; 1922, 2nd edn 1946) and numerous articles on military affairs.

== Honour and awards ==
- Imperial Order of St. Vladimir, 4th class with swords and bows
- Order of St. Anne, 4th class
- Order of St. Stanislaus, 2nd and 3rd classes
