= Volodymyr Bahaziy =

Ukrainian nationalist

- Володимир Багазій
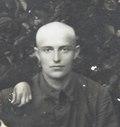

Mayor of Kyiv (German-installed)
- In office 29 October 1941 – 19 February 1942
- Preceded by: Oleksander Ohloblyn
- Succeeded by: Leontiy Forostivskyi

Personal details
- Born: 1902 Riabiivka, Russian Empire (now Ukraine)
- Died: 21 February 1942 (aged 41–42) Kyiv, Reichskommissariat Ukraine, Nazi Germany (now Ukraine)
- Party: Organization of Ukrainian Nationalists (Melnykite)

Volodymyr Panteleimonovych Bahaziy (Ukrainian: Вoлoдимир Пантелеймонович Багазiй; 1902 – 21 February 1942) was a Ukrainian nationalist affiliated with Andriy Melnyk who was head of Kyiv City Administration under German occupation from October 1941 to February 1942.

== Biography ==
Born in the village of Riabiyivka (now in Volochysk urban hromada, Khmelnytsky Oblast), Bahaziy was a professional pedagogue, taught in a Jewish school, and later was a postgraduate student at Kyiv Pedagogical Institute. In September 1941, when the Germans occupied Kyiv, Oleksandr Ohloblyn who knew him for years invited him at the meeting where representatives of Organization of Ukrainian Nationalists associated with Andriy Melnyk formed the new Kyiv city administration. Although Bahaziy was supported by a large group, the OUN representatives mistrusted him and agreed to appoint him a deputy to Ohloblyn who became the city mayor. Very soon, however, Bahaziy gained the favour of both OUN people (for his active participation in the activities of the Ukrainian National Council) and the German military leaders. The claims that he was personally present during the execution of Jews in Babi Yar were later proven to be untrue. In October 1941, Ohloblyn retired and Bahaziy was appointed the new mayor of Kyiv.

As mayor of Kyiv, Bahaziy encountered the bitter opposition of Erich Koch, the brutal Nazi administrator of Reichskommissariat Ukraine. At a speech before journalists Bahaziy praised OUN leaders and proclaimed that "the eyes of all Ukrainians are turned toward Melnyk." A German officer begged the journalists not to disseminate this remark for fear of inflaming Nazi authorities. In January 1942, Bahaziy was arrested and accused of various crimes, including threatening the pro-Russian bishop of Kyiv, theft of German property in order to aid the Ukrainian nationalist cause, being a leader of the Melnykite wing of the OUN, and attempting to secure the control of the Ukrainian police. He was soon after executed in Babi Yar along with other Ukrainian nationalists, although his wife was left unaware of his death and kept bringing him packages to Kyiv prison until summer 1942.
