= Ukrainian liberation movement (1920–1950) =

Anti-Soviet and Nazi-aligned campaign

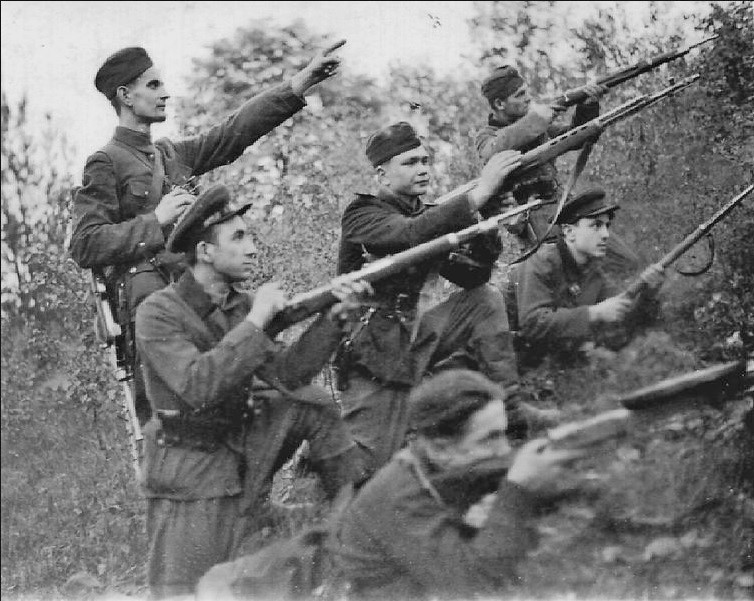
UPA partisans in 1947

The Ukrainian liberation movement from 1920 to 1950 was an armed and political struggle to re-establish an independent Ukrainian state following the defeat of Ukrainian statehood in the Ukrainian War of Independence. It opposed the partition of modern Ukraine among the Soviet Union, Second Polish Republic, Czechoslovakia, and Romania. The movement included various political, military, and underground organisations, which was mainly active in Western Ukraine.

The movement comprised many ideologies, including Ukrainian nationalism, monarchism, republicanism, which differed in their visions for a future Ukrainian state. Ukrainian nationalism became dominant, shaping organisations such as the Organisation of Ukrainian Nationalists, while monarchist and republican groups remained active in exile.

During World War II, these organisations engaged in political activity, armed resistance and at times cooperated with foreign powers such as Nazi Germany. The Ukrainian Military Organization (UVO), Organisation of Ukrainian Nationalists (OUN), and Ukrainian Insurgent Army (UPA) were among the most important groups. The movement declined by the early 1950s due to suppression by Soviet authorities.

== Ideology ==
The main goal of the movement was to establish an independent Ukrainian state through armed struggle. The movement was a direct consequence of the loss of statehood in the early 1920s. The movement included different ideologies and views on the future political and socio-economic order of an independent Ukraine.

=== Ukrainian nationalism ===
Ukrainian nationalist ideas developed in the early 1920s under the influence of the political thinker Dmytro Dontsov. Ukrainian nationalists rejected socialism and liberal democracy, as they viewed these ideologies as contributing to the failure of the Ukrainian People's Republic. Nationalism advocated for independence through a national revolution led by a strong and centralized authority, emphasizing the importance of the nation over individual interests. It was often described as "active nationalism". It promoted unity, the mobilization of society to achieve statehood, and accepted political violence as a legitimate means to achieve its goals.

These ideas greatly influenced organisations such as the Ukrainian Military Organisation (UVO) and the Organisation of Ukrainian Nationalists (OUN). They shaped the strategies and activities of these groups during World War II. Some scholars have noted the similarities between Ukrainian nationalism and other movements in Central and Eastern Europe, including groups such as the Ustaše, especially in their emphasis on authoritarian leadership and revolutionary methods.

Ukrainian National Democratic Alliance (UNDO), a Ukrainian nationalist party, was founded in 1925. It was the largest Ukrainian political party in the Second Polish Republic and was active in western Ukraine. The UNDO supported constitutional democracy and the organic development of Ukrainian society. It was dissolved during the Soviet annexation of Western Ukraine in 1939.

During the 1930s, some scholars describe Ukrainian nationalism as undergoing a process of "fascistisation", which resulted in a mixture of national-liberationist and fascist elements. This development was identified by scholars as one of the factors that influenced cooperation between some Ukrainian nationalist groups and Nazi Germany in the late 1930s and early 1940s.

=== Cossack movement ===
Cossack nationalism is a socio-political movement that seeks to recognize the Don, Kuban, Astrakhan, Terek, and Ural Cossacks as a single political nation and the creation of a Cossack state named Cossackia.

Following the suppression of the Kuban People's Republic, small Cossack insurgent groups continued to operate in the Kuban region from 1921 to 1926. But were all ultimately suppressed by Soviet authorities. During World War II, a new Kuban Cossack movement emerged. Their aim was to establish a Cossack nation in the Cossack-inhabited regions.

Some Cossack units were incorporated into German-controlled formations. They are often referred as Cossack units within the Wehrmacht. They were deployed in various regions, including Yugoslavia. Their alignment with Nazi Germany was driven mainly due to their opposition to the Soviet Union. After World War II, limited underground activities persisted in the Kuban, including groups associated with the OUN such as the Cossack Insurgent Army; however, these formations were not directly related to the earlier Cossack movements.

=== Monarchism (Hetman movement) ===
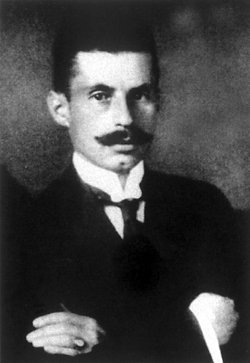
Vyacheslav Lypynsky

The Hetmanite movement was a conservative-monarchist movement that sought to restore Ukrainian independence and establish the Ukrainian State and Hetmanate under Pavlo Skoropadskyi. The movement was based on the theory of Ukrainian monarchism by Vyacheslav Lypynsky. It emphasized political stability and continuity with historical Cossack state traditions. It had the indirect support of the Ukrainian Catholic Church.

Although it played a role in émigré political circles, the Hetmanite movement did not engage in significant armed struggles and remained marginal compared to other nationalist organizations.

Historian John Armstrong described the movement as a form of Ukrainian monarchist nationalism.

=== Republican democracy ===
The republicans composed the majority in the government of the Ukrainian People's Republic in exile. The government was led by Andriy Livytskyi, the President of the UNR since 1926. Symon Petliura and his party, the Ukrainian Social Democratic Workers' Party, was not part of the UNR Government in exile, but accepted its legitimacy.

The Republicans opposed foreign interference and advocated for a fully independent Ukraine. However, they engaged with limited contact with the Germans at the beginning of the occupation of Ukraine.

== History ==
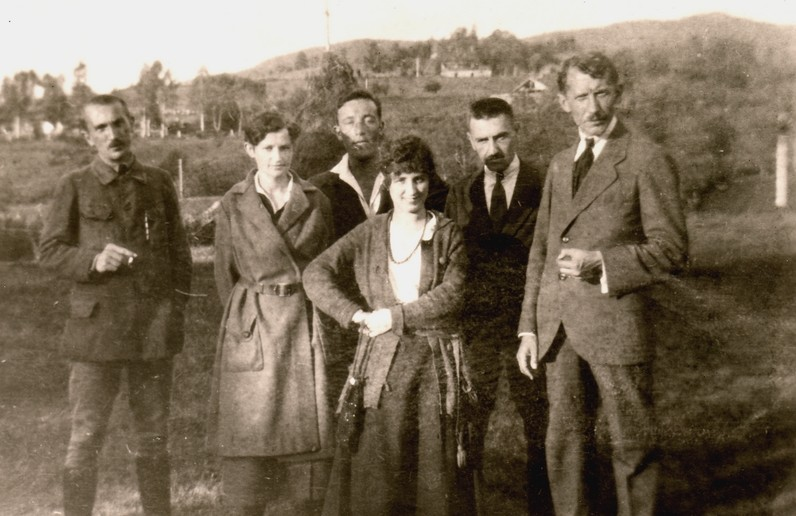
Leader of the UVO, Yevhen Konovalets in 1921

The Ukrainian liberation movement emerged in the aftermath of the Ukrainian War of Independence, which resulted in the defeat of Ukrainian statehood and the partition of modern Ukraine among the Soviet Union, Second Polish Republic, Romania, and Czechoslovakia.

In August 1920, the UVO was formed by former members of the Sich Riflemen and the Ukrainian Galician Army. The organisation was led by Yevhen Konovalets, the former commander of the Sich Riflemen. The UVO carried out many operations, including acts of sabotage and targeted attacks, primarily against Polish and Bolshevik authorities. The organisation's headquarters was in Lviv.

In the 1920s and 1930s, the Ukrainian people under Polish rule faced political repressions, cultural restrictions and limited autonomy. This resulted in the formation of underground paramilitary groups, such as the OUN, which was established in 1929. It was also led by Yevhen Konovalets. The OUN adopted a strategy of violence, terrorism, and assassinations with their goal to create a totalitarian and ethnically homogeneous Ukrainian state. In November 1938, the Carpathian Sich was established by OUN soldiers and Galician Ukrainians. It is a paramilitary organization in Transcarpathia.

=== World War II ===
Some Ukrainian nationalists hoped that a German victory over the Soviet Union would lead to the formation of a Ukrainian state, or that such a conflict would be a repeat of World War I whereby the dominant empires had exhausted themselves, giving rise to a period of anarchy in which a Ukrainian state could assert itself. Within the nationalist movement, therefore, many wanted to collaborate with the Nazis to establish military formations, as well as a foothold in eastern Ukraine. In August 1939, the day after the signing of the Molotov–Ribbentrop Pact, the UNDO declared that, despite outstanding disagreements, it would defend Poland in the event of war. Following the Soviet invasion of Poland in September 1939 and its annexation of eastern Galicia and Volhynia in November 1939, Soviet authorities forced the UNDO to dissolve and imprisoned its leaders.

The OUN collaborated with the Abwehr to plan an uprising during the expected German invasion of Poland and to train a legion commanded by Roman Sushko, however this was largely abandoned due to the Nazi–Soviet Pact and may have been used by the Germans to pressure the Soviets to launch their invasion. Abwehr chief Wilhelm Canaris had given the OUN leadership the impression that Germany would support the creation of a Nazi-aligned West Ukrainian polity, with the 1939 constitution drafted by the OUN envisaging this as "sovereign, authoritarian, totalitarian... bearing the name 'Ukrainian State'". Following the release of OUN members from Polish prisons, the younger more-radical generation rallied around Stepan Bandera and in 1940 the OUN split into two factions: the Melnykites (OUN(M)) led by Andriy Melnyk and the Banderites (OUN(B)) led by Bandera.

During the German invasion of the Soviet Union from June 1941 onwards, the OUN factions sent expeditionary groups into Soviet Ukraine to shadow the Wehrmacht's advance and to set up local administrations, with the OUN(B) forming the Nachtigall and Roland battalions under the Abwehr in early 1941. Both factions of the OUN were antisemitic and engaged in anto-Jewish pogroms (including the mid-1941 Lviv pogroms involving members of the OUN(B)), though neither OUN faction considered Jews their main enemy (which remained the Soviet Union or Poland). OUN members also joined the Ukrainian Auxiliary Police, which supported the implementation of the Holocaust in Ukraine.

==== OUN(B) ====
In Lviv on 30 June 1941, the OUN(B) unilaterally proclaimed an independent Ukrainian state, with Yaroslav Stetsko as prime minister under Bandera. The proclamation specified that the state would "cooperate closely with National Socialist Greater Germany... under the Führer Adolf Hitler." The Germans arrested Bandera and Stetsko shortly afterwards, took them to Berlin, and later transferred them to Sachsenhausen concentration camp. Initially allowed to continue his political activities, Stetsko delegated the leadership of the OUN(B) in Ukraine to Mykola Lebed. Following the assassination of OUN(M) members Mykola Stsiborskyi and Omelyan Senyk in August 1941, and amid mutual denunciations, the Nazi authorities initiated a wider crackdown on the Banderites.

Forced underground, the OUN(B) decided at an October 1942 conference in Lviv to establish an army. The first partisan units formed in January–February 1943, swelled by deserters from the auxiliary police, with the Banderite force co-opting the name Ukrainian Insurgent Army (UPA) in April–May to capitalise on the popularity of Taras Bulba-Borovets's partisan formation of the same name formed in December 1941. Roman Shukhevych was appointed commander of the UPA in November, later becoming head of the OUN(B) by 1944. The UPA resisted the German occupation, combatted Soviet and Polish partisans, and pursued a campaign of ethnic cleansing against Poles in Volhynia and eastern Galicia that led to Polish reprisals. According to Timothy Snyder, the Banderite leadership believed that the final conflict would be with a resurrected Poland once Germany and the USSR had exhausted themselves. The OUN(B) sought to absorb Melnykite and Borovets partisan-groups through negotiations or by force. In August 1943, the OUN(B) liberalised its ideology and in 1945 publicly abandoned ethnonationalism. The OUN(B) established the Ukrainian Supreme Liberation Council (UHVR) in mid-1944, chaired by Shukhevych, to serve as a pluralist non-partisan platform, though representatives of the OUN(M), UPR, and Metropolitan Andrey Sheptytsky did not attend and it was practically dominated by the OUN(B). Following the Soviet counteroffensive, the UPA continued to wage an insurgency against the USSR.

==== OUN(M) ====
Melnykites played an integral role in establishing the collaborationist Ukrainian Central Committee (UTsK) under Volodymyr Kubijovyč in 1940 to represent Ukrainians in the General Government. While not a member of the OUN, Kubijovyč tacitly supported the Melnykite faction. In October 1941, Melnykites established a Ukrainian National Council in Kyiv that they hoped would form the basis of a national government, though the Nazi authorities intitiated a violent crackdown on the organization from November onwards. OUN(M) members also set up partisan units, though these were forcibly merged into the UPA in 1943. Alongside the Ukrainian Greek Catholic Church, the OUN(M) supported the creation of the volunteer Waffen-SS Galicia Division in April, organized by Kubijovyč's UTsK, and later established the Ukrainian Legion of Self-Defense in November in collaboration with the SD. Melnyk himself was confined to Berlin from mid-1941 before being arrested in January 1944, alongside mass arrests of the OUN(M) leadership, and later transferred to Sachsenhausen.

==== Ukrainian People's Revolutionary Army ====
Borovets met with President of the UNR in exile Andriy Livytskyi in 1940 to discuss the formation of a partisan force, subsequently crossing the border into Polesia. With the outbreak of the German–Soviet War, Borovets disarmed a Soviet militia in Sarny and was made a police commander by the Germans in August 1941 in order to root out Soviet resistance, being given permission to establish the Polissian Sich formation. Borovets demobilised his units in November following unsuccessful negotiations with the Germans, though began creating partisan forces from December that were intended to resist the occupation. He started to officially use the name Ukrainian Insurgent Army, after a 1919 anti-Soviet partisan group that was subordinated to the Ukrainian People's Republic, and began operations against the Germans in April 1942. Borovets agreed a ceasefire with Soviet partisans in October, continuing negotiations with the Germans. He changed the formation's name to the Ukrainian People's Revolutionary Army in response to the Banderite UPA and rejected the ethnic cleansing of Poles. Borovets disbanded the formation in late 1943 and travelled to Warsaw for negotiations with the Germans, where he was arrested and imprisoned in Sachsenhausen.

==== Ukrainian National Committee ====
Nazi Party and SS officials aimed to set up a central Ukrainian political body in order to tap into the manpower of roughly two million Ukrainian refugees, Ostarbeiter, and prisoners-of-war, with Ukrainian nationalist leaders released from German prisons in the autumn of 1944. Opposed to subordination under Andrey Vlasov's Committee for the Liberation of the Peoples of Russia, Melnyk, Bandera, Livytskyi, and Hetmanite leader Pavlo Skoropadsky agreed on a common stance to take in negotiations. The Petliurite Pavlo Shandruk was accepted to lead the body, though the Banderites did not give their official approval and Melnyk later withdrew his. Collaborationist Ukrainian military units were unified under the Ukrainian National Army, though remained under the command of German officers, and the Ukrainian National Committee was officially recognised in March 1945. The committee issued a proclamation that declared its support for an independent Ukrainian state, with its stated function being to care for Ukrainian refugees, workers, and soldiers in German territory.

=== Post war ===
From 1944 to the early 1950s, the UPA continued an armed insurgency against the Soviet administration while OUN(B) underground networks operated in the Kuban and in the Far East (Manchuria, Zeleny Klyn, etc.), where, according to the 1926 census, about half or majority of the population are Ukrainians. In April 1945, British troops surrendered 50,000-70,000 Cossacks of the Cossack State (Cossack units within the Wehrmacht) to the Soviet Union in Lienz, Austria. Among them was Andrei Shkuro, who participated in the Ukrainian Kuban movement.

== See also ==
- Ukrainian Supreme Liberation Council
- Massacres of Poles in Volhynia and Eastern Galicia
- Operation Vistula
- Anti-Soviet resistance by the Ukrainian Insurgent Army

== Bibliography ==
- Armstrong, John A. (1963). Ukrainian Nationalism (2nd ed.). New York: Columbia University Press.
- Berkhoff, Karel C. (2004). Harvest of Despair: Life and Death in Ukraine under Nazi Rule. Cambridge, MA; London: Harvard University Press; Belknap Press. doi:10.2307/j.ctv1p6hnvg. ISBN 978-0-674-01313-1. JSTOR j.ctv1p6hnvg.
- Berkhoff, Karel C.; Abakunova, Anna; Dean, Martin; Dieckmann, Christoph; Dumitru, Diana; Feferman, Kiril; Hrynevych, Vladyslav; Khiterer, Victoria; Kruglov, Alexander; Pohl, Dieter; Quinkert, Babette; Radchenko, Yuri; Rebrova, Irina; Struve, Kai; Titarenko, Dmitrii; Umansky, Andrej (2018). Basic Historical Narrative of the Babyn Yar Holocaust Memorial Center (PDF) (Report). Kyiv: Foundation and Babyn Yar Holocaust Memorial Center.
- Bruder, Franziska (2007). "Den ukrainischen Staat erkämpfen oder sterben!" Die Organisation ukrainischer Nationalisten (OUN) 1929–1948 ["Fight for the Ukrainian State or Die!" The Organisation of Ukrainian Nationalists (OUN) 1929–1948] (in German). Berlin: Metropol Verlag.
- Markiewicz, Paweł (2021). Unlikely Allies: Nazi German and Ukrainian Nationalist Collaboration in the General Government During World War II. West Lafayette, IN: Purdue University Press. doi:10.2307/j.ctv1hw3x8j. ISBN 978-1-61249-679-5. JSTOR j.ctv1hw3x8j.
- Motyka, Grzegorz (2006). Ukraińska partyzantka 1942–1960: Działalność Organizacji Ukraińskich Nacjonalistów i Ukraińskiej Powstańczej Armii [Ukrainian Partisans 1942–1960: Activities of the Organisation of Ukrainian Nationalists and the Ukrainian Insurgent Army] (PDF) (in Polish). Warsaw: Rytm. ISBN 978-8-3679-2737-6.
- Radchenko, Yuri; Usach, Andrii (2020). ""For the Eradication of Polish and Jewish-Muscovite Rule in Ukraine": An Examination of the Crimes of the Ukrainian Legion of Self-Defense". Holocaust and Genocide Studies. 34 (3): 450–477. doi:10.1093/hgs/dcaa056.
- Rudling, Per Anders (2011). "The OUN, the UPA and the Holocaust: A Study in the Manufacturing of Historical Myths". The Carl Beck Papers in Russian and East European Studies. 2107. Pittsburgh: University Center for Russian and East European Studies.
- Shkandrij, Myroslav (2015). Ukrainian Nationalism: Politics, Ideology, and Literature, 1929–1956. New Haven: Yale University Press.
- Snyder, Timothy (2003). The Reconstruction of Nations: Poland, Ukraine, Lithuania, Belarus, 1569–1999. New Haven: Yale University Press. ISBN 978-030-012-841-3.
- Yekelchyk, Serhy (2007). Ukraine: Birth of a Modern Nation (PDF). Oxford: Oxford University Press. ISBN 978-0-19-530545-6.
