= Roman Sushko =

- Роман Сушко
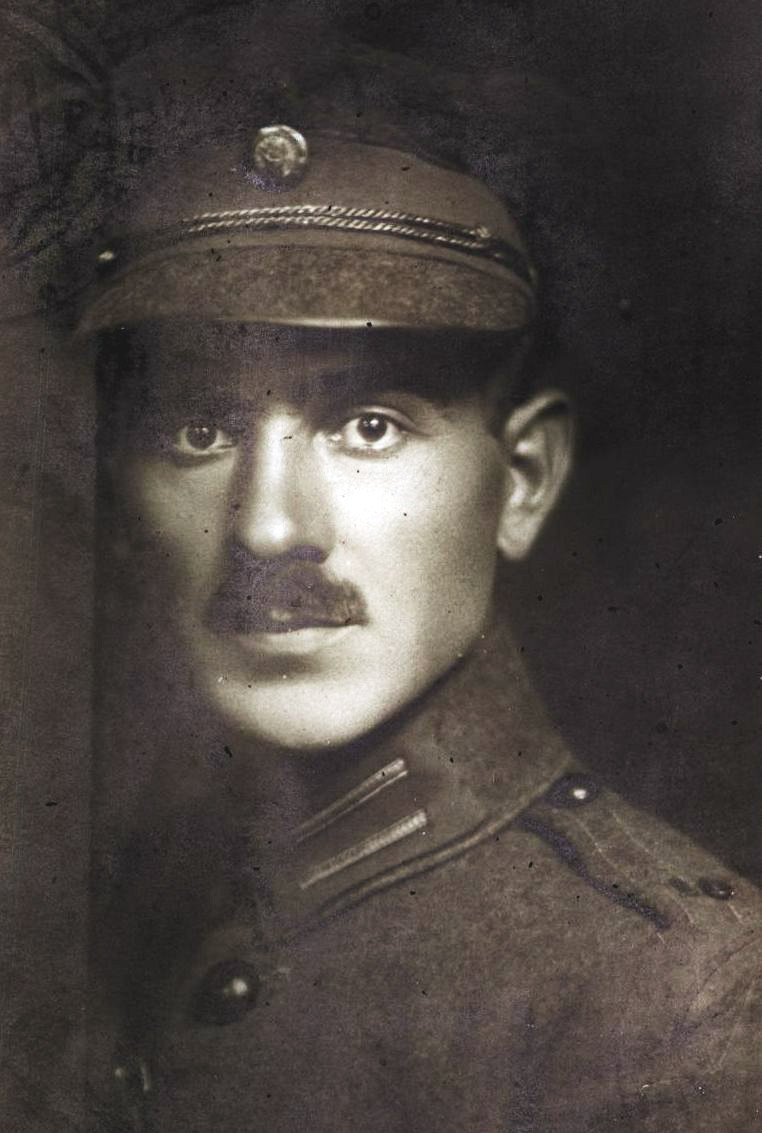
- Portrait, 1920.
- Born: 9 March 1894; Remeniv, Austrian Galicia, Austria-Hungary
- Died: 14 January 1944 (aged 49); Lviv, District of Galicia, Greater German Reich
- Burial place: Lychakiv Cemetery, Lviv
- Military career
- Allegiance: Austria-Hungary; Ukraine
- Branch: Austro-Hungarian Army; Ukrainian People's Army; Wehrmacht Group South
- Service years: 1914–1916; 1918–1921; 1939
- Rank: Colonel; Lieutenant; Captain
- Nicknames: 'Sych' and 'Condrat'
- Units: Legion of Ukrainian Sich Riflemen; Sich Riflemen; Bergbauernhilfe ("Ukrainian Legion")
- Commands: Sich Riflemen; Bergbauernhilfe
- Conflicts: First World War; Eastern Front; Battle of Makivka; Russian Civil War; Ukrainian War of Independence; Ukrainian–Soviet War; Kiev Arsenal January Uprising; Second Winter Campaign; Anti-Hetman Uprising; Battle of Motovylivka; Invasion of Poland; OUN Uprising of 1939
- Other work: Politician, co-creator of the UVO and OUN

Roman Kyrylovych Sushko (Ukrainian: Роман Кирилович Сушко; 9 March 1894 – 12 January 1944) was a Ukrainian officer and politician who served on the Provid (the émigré leadership) of the Organisation of Ukrainian Nationalists (OUN) and later the Melnykite faction. He also cofounded its predecessor, the Ukrainian Military Organisation (UVO), and was a veteran of the First World War and the Ukrainian War of Independence, serving as a senior officer in the Sich Riflemen.

Sushko collaborated with the Nazis from 1938 whereby he commanded two battalions, codenamed Bergbauernhilfe, as part of the planned OUN Uprising of 1939. He also played an instrumental role in establishing the Ukrainian Central Committee in occupied-Poland. In January 1944, he was assassinated in Lviv by unknown perpetrators.

== Early life and education ==
Sushko was born on 9 March 1894 in the village of Remeniv, Austrian Galicia (today part of Lviv Raion, Ukraine). He graduated from Lviv Academic Gymnasium in 1912 and went on to study at the Law Faculty of the University of Lviv. Sushko was active in the Sich and Plast movements. (Note: Sich societies were active in Galicia between 1900 and 1930 and were focused on physical education and firefighting, while also promoting national consciousness.)

== First World War ==
During the First World War, Sushko commanded a company of the Legion of Ukrainian Sich Riflemen (USS) and fought in the battles of Makivka and Lysonia, rising to the rank of lieutenant. He was captured by the Russians in September 1916 and, as of March 1917, was held in a lightly guarded internment camp near Dubovka, alongside Andriy Melnyk and Fedir Chernyk [ukr].

In preparation for joining the Ukrainian War of Independence, Sushko worked with his fellow USS officers in the internment camp to organise a system of lecture courses for their fellow prisoners-of-war on political economy, the history and geography of Ukraine, and military affairs. On receiving word from Yevhen Konovalets about the permittance of former members of the Austro-Hungarian Army into Ukrainian ranks, Sushko escaped alongside his fellow officers in December.

== Ukrainian War of Independence ==
Sushko arrived in Kyiv in early January 1918 and assisted in organising the Sich Riflemen under the Ukrainian People's Republic. He initially commanded one of two frontline infantry sotni, later commanding a kurin when the unit was expanded in March. Sushko's forces were among the frontline units that were reorganised under the command of Symon Petliura in order to launch a counteroffensive against the Kyiv Arsenal January Uprising and assist in liberating the city. Following the installation of the Ukrainian State in April and the demobilisation of the Sich Riflemen, Sushko accompanied Konovalets at a meeting with Dmytro Dontsov in July where they attempted to lobby Hetman Pavlo Skoropadskyi for its restoration.

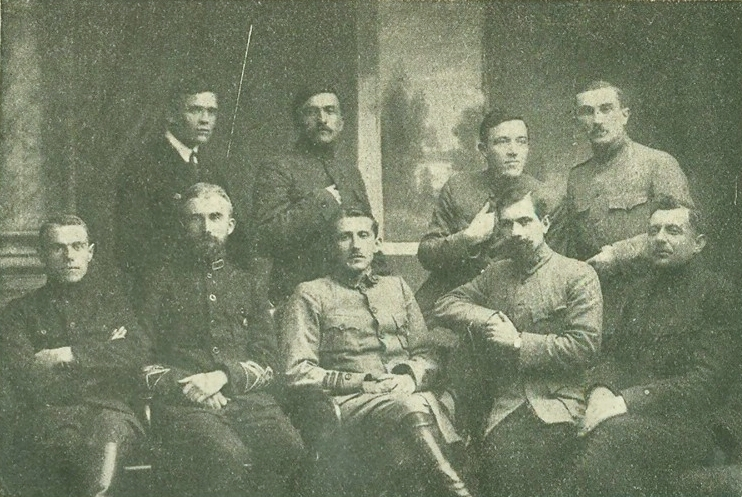
Members of the last supreme command of the Sich Riflemen; Lutsk, January 1920. Sushko is seated, fourth from the left. (Note: Seated (L-R): Mykhailo Matchak, Andriy Melnyk, Yevhen Konovalets, Sushko, Ivan Dankiv. Standing (L-R): Ivan Andrukh, Roman Dachkevitch, Vasyl Kuchabskyi, Yaroslav Chyzh.)

Sushko worked to organise the new Sich Riflemen formation in Bila Tserkva and commanded the main kurin of the unit during the November Anti-Hetman Uprising, being conferred the rank of colonel. He later commanded the Northern Group on the eastern front from January 1919 and, following a reorganisation, assumed command of the 11th Division in July. Around this time, Sushko met Princess Christina Trubetskaya-Dolgorukaya (going by the false name 'Skachkivska') whom he married soon after. With the Ukrainian People's Army caught in a 'death triangle', Sushko's 11th Division was deployed against Anton Denikin's White Volunteers in October 1919. Soon after the disbandment of the Sich Riflemen in December, Sushko was captured by Polish troops and interned in Lutsk.

He was later released in March 1920 and commanded a brigade of the newly formed Sich Rifleman Division. Sushko co-founded the Ukrainian Military Organisation alongside his fellow riflemen and later led a brigade during the 1921 Second Winter Campaign, whereafter he was interned by the Poles until 1922.

== Interwar period and invasion of Poland ==
Sushko moved to Lviv, now part of Poland, and in 1924 was a founding member of the Ukrainian Party of National Work (UPNR) which was later dissolved in 1925 when its members joined the Ukrainian National Democratic Alliance. (Note: The UPNR denounced cosmopolitanism and its slogan was "Ukraine for the Ukrainians". According to the Encyclopedia of Ukraine, the UPNR's political programme strongly influenced the direction of Ukrainian nationalism despite it not achieving its goals.) He settled in Prague where he graduated from the Faculty of Law of Charles University in 1927. That same year, Sushko became head of the UVO Home Command and was also military editor of the UVO/OUN underground periodical Surma (1927–1934), contributing articles on military theory and tactics. He was arrested by the Polish authorities on several occasions and, amid UVO cooperation with Weimar Germany and waves of arrests for pro-German espionage, his leadership generated discontent among members of the Home Command with there being efforts to remove him.

Following the founding of the Organisation of Ukrainian Nationalists (OUN) in 1929, it was decided that the UVO was to become the military department of the OUN, retaining its name for legal and propaganda purposes, with the OUN and UVO undergrounds merged in 1930. Sushko was a member of the OUN Provid (the executive command in exile) and worked in the organisation's military department. He travelled to the United States and Canada in 1933 and 1938, tasked with consolidating the OUN cells there and soliciting financial support for the organisation's activities.

=== Collaboration with Nazi intelligence ===
From 1938, Sushko led the training of OUN members in Wiener-Neustadt, Austria in collaboration with the Abwehr. This training encompassed lessons in military theory and ideological indoctrination while practical army drills were taught by Kriminalpolizei or Schutzpolizei officers. Sushko met with Generalmajor Erwin von Lahousen in June 1939 to discuss the deployment of OUN émigrés east, whereafter the Hungarian government agreed to release former soldiers of the Carpathian Sich from internment. Two battalions totalling 280 men were set up under the command of Major Hans Dehmel of the Vienna Abwehr branch and Sushko, codenamed Bergbauernhilfe (BBH) (Note: Meaning 'Mountain Peasant's Help', this was on account of the soldiers being disguised as mining labourers in a covert camp near Salzburg. The unit was known in Ukrainian as 'Viiskovi viddily natsionalistiv ' (Military Units of Nationalists) due to it sharing the same initials in Cyrillic.) and also colloquially known as the 'Ukrainian Legion' or 'Sushko's Legion'. The BBH battalions were intended to act as a nucleus for a "Ukrainian uprising", together with OUN combat and sabotage groups within Poland, in order to divert Polish forces and sow disorder in the Polish rear. Sushko was instructed by Melnyk, now leader of the OUN, to form a state out of the first Ukrainian village reached, with the uprising envisioned as a means by which to liberate Eastern Galicia from Polish rule.

In the first weeks of their invasion the Germans delayed triggering the uprising in the context of the Nazi–Soviet Pact, intending to use the prospect of an alternative Ukrainian state to pressure the Soviet Union into commencing their attack as early as possible. After some confusion the BBH battalions were activated on 12 September and attached to Wehrmacht Group South whereby they crossed into Poland and set up administrations in territories inhabited by Ukrainians. Sushko, together with Yaroslav Baranovsky and Osyp Boidunyk who were attached to his staff, reached Sambir on 15 September where they were joined by Melnyk and set up a temporary headquarters, intending to move to Lviv as soon as possible. Following the Soviet invasion from the east, BBH members retreated westwards with the German Army. Sushko established a regrouping point in Krosno for OUN members fleeing the Soviet annexation of Galicia where he demobilised the BBH formations.

== Activity in occupied-Poland ==
In October, Sushko lobbied the German authorities from his temporary base in Krosno for greater Ukrainian representation, the reactivation of the Prosvita society, the establishment of Ukrainian primary schools and gymnasiums, a Ukrainian university or faculty at Jagiellonian University, and the creation of a Ukrainian police or militia. (Note: Similar localised efforts and committees sprung up throughout Ukrainian communities in occupied-Poland.) On 17 November, a delegation headed by Sushko and Volodymyr Kubijovyč presented their demands to Hans Frank for a centralised organisation representing Ukrainians in the General Government. Given that the Germans insisted that the leader of such an organisation needed to be native to the territory so as not to upset the Nazi–Soviet alliance, he nominated Kubijovyč who was accepted.

Sushko moved to Kraków in late 1939 to head the OUN executive in the General Government and maintained close contacts with the Abwehr, receiving assurances from Dehmel as to the development of Ukrainian police units and recruiting nationalists to work for German intelligence in the Soviet occupation zone. With the split of the OUN into Melnykites and Banderites, Sushko sided with the Melnykite faction. In April 1940 the Ukrainian Central Committee (UTsK) was formally established to distribute aid and welfare to Ukrainians in the General Government, based in the same building as Hans Koch's Kraków office and the Melnykite leadership where Sushko had his office. (Note: During this time, the OUN(m)'s organisational centre was disguised a charity office for refugees.) After ejecting a group of young Bandera adherents who attempted to take over the UTsK headquarters, Sushko led a raid on the Banderites' offices in August, disrupting their press operation. Sushko was initially the chief organiser of camps training Ukrainians for police units and as interpreters for the Wehrmacht, however with the split of the OUN many of these groups came under the control of the Banderites.

In the summer of 1941, and after the German invasion of the Soviet Union, Sushko moved to Lviv where he was active in the OUN(m) underground. In July, Sushko joined Melnyk and his fellow former officers of the UNA in submitting an appeal to Adolf Hitler through the Abwehr, requesting that they be permitted to create a Ukrainian military formation.

== Death ==
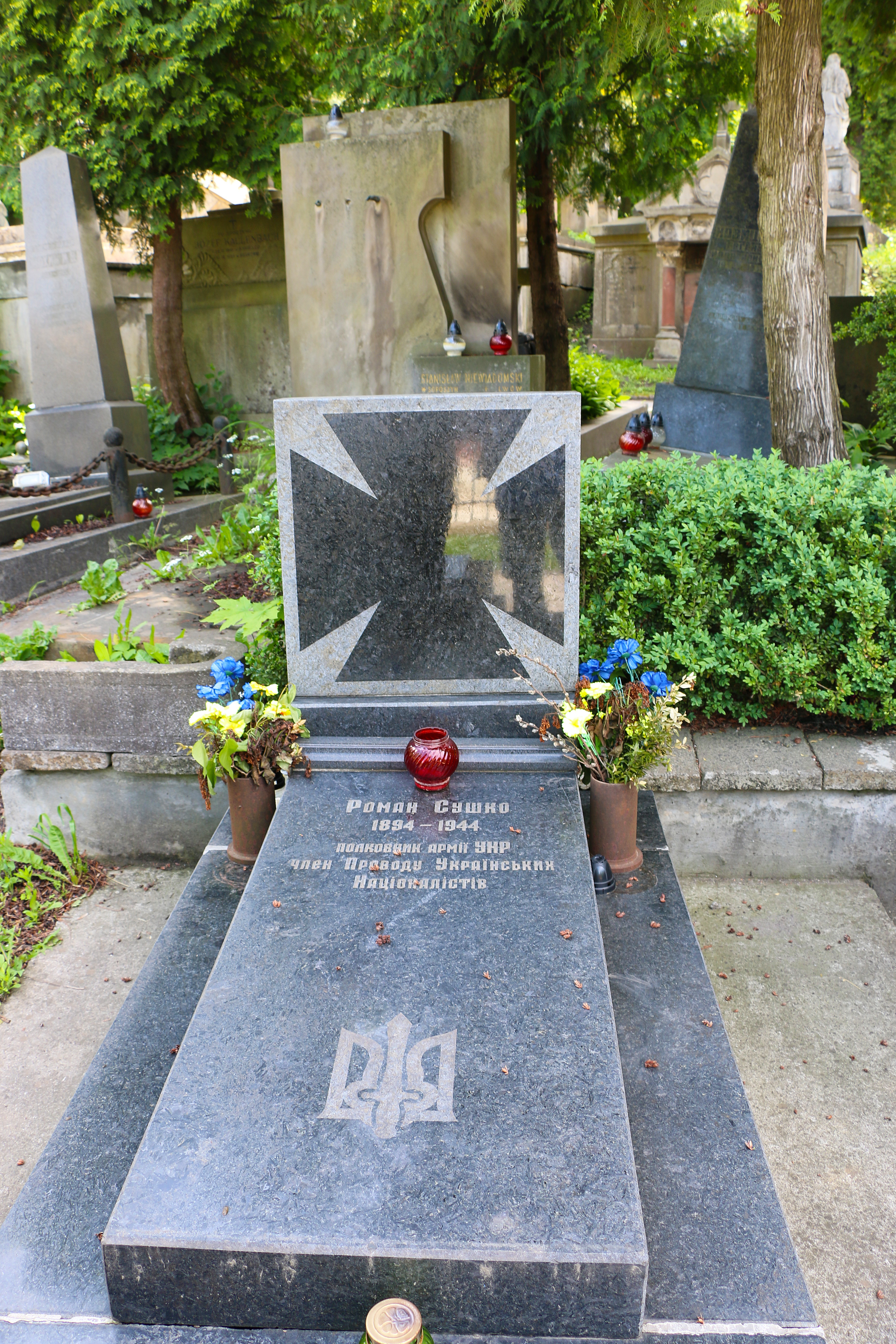
Sushko's grave in Lychakiv Cemetery, Lviv.

Sushko was assassinated in Lviv on 14 January 1944, likely perpetrated by Banderites or possibly by agents of the Gestapo. Melnykites blamed the OUN(b) for the assassination.

Streets are named after him in Lviv and Brovary.

== Bibliography ==
- Armstrong, John (1963). Ukrainian Nationalism (2nd ed.). New York: Columbia University Press.
- Bolianovskyi, Andrii (1999). "Cooperation between the German Military of the Weimar Republic and the Ukrainian Military Organization, 1923-1928". Harvard Ukrainian Studies. 23 (1/2): 73–84. JSTOR 41036769.
- Khoma, Ivan (2011). Sichovi Striltsi. Stvorennia, viiskovo-politychna diialnist ta zbroina borotba Sichovykh Striltsiv u 1917-1919rr [Sich Riflemen. Creation, Military-Political Activities and Armed Struggle of the Sich Riflemen in 1917-1919] (in Ukrainian). Kyiv: Nash chas [Our Time]. Archived from the original on 2019-12-25.
- Khoma, Ivan (2018). "Yevhen Konovalets u Lutskomu tabori dlia internovanykh (hruden 1919 – berezen 1920 rr.)" [Yevhen Konovalets in the Lutsk internment camp (December 1919 – March 2020)]. Historical and Cultural Studies (in Ukrainian). 5: 43–46.
- Khromeychuk, Olesya (2015). "Ukrainians in the German Armed Forces During the Second World War". History. 100 (5 (343)): 704–724.
- Markiewicz, Pawel (2018). "The Ukrainian Central Committee, 1940-1945: A case of collaboration in Nazi-occupied Poland". PhD diss., Jagiellonian University.
- Sribnyak, Ihor Volodymyrovych (2018). "An unobtrusive victory (several episodes from the life of Lieutenant Army UNR, doctor Khrystyna Skachkivska-Sushko, 1919-1925)". Our Life (in Ukrainian). LXXV (1): 13–16.
- Wysocki, Roman (2003). Organizacja ukraińskich nacjonalistów w Polsce w latach 1929-1939: geneza, struktura, program, ideologia [The Organisation of Ukrainian Nationalists in Poland in 1929-1939: Genesis, Structure, Programme, Ideology] (in Polish). Lublin: UMCS Publishing House.
