= OUN Uprising of 1939 =

Ukrainian nationalist uprising

- Part of Invasion of Poland and Polish-Ukrainian ethnic conflict
Date	September 12 – October 1939
Location	Galicia and Volhynia
Result	See Aftermath

Belligerents
(Second Polish Republic) Poland	OUN; Supported by: (Nazi Germany) Abwehr

Commanders and leaders
(Second Polish Republic) Stefan Dembiński	Andriy Melnyk (Nazi Germany) Wilhelm Canaris

Strength
Unknown	7,729

Casualties and losses
769 killed 37 wounded 3,610 captured	160 killed 53 wounded
- 3,000 Polish civilians killed

The OUN Uprising of 1939 (Polish: Dywersja OUN w 1939 roku, Ukrainian: Повстання ОУН 1939 року, romanized: Povstannya OUN 1939 roku) were sabotage actions by supporters and militias of the Organisation of Ukrainian Nationalists carried out during the Invasion of Poland. The uprising was inspired by the Third Reich's interests in weakening Polish forces behind the main front.

== Background ==
=== Ukrainian Military Organization ===
In the first half of the 1920s, the Ukrainian Military Organisation (UWO) succeeded in forming several guerrilla units, but they were broken up by Polish security forces. The concept of forming partisan units was revisited in 1934, after the final merger of the UWO with the structures of the Organisation of Ukrainian Nationalists. This was a green cadre project, providing for OUN activists to take shelter in the forests and form partisan units in the event of arrest. At a meeting in February 1934 of the OUN National Executive (attended by Stepan Bandera, Ivan Maluca, Yaroslav Stećko, Yaroslav Spolśkyj, Oleksandr Paszkewycz and Yaroslav Makarushka), it was decided that such units would operate in Volhynia, and one of their tasks would be to recapture OUN members from prison. However, the announcement of the decision to create detachments was withheld until the commanders of these groups had been appointed.

The UWO was financed, supported and controlled by German intelligence throughout its existence, and the UWO leadership maintained constant contacts with German officers. The organisation's intelligence was headed by Roman Suszko. In order to control the UWO, the Germans delegated to it, as its political director, Riko Jary (an Austrian and later German intelligence officer), who, under the pretext of conducting scientific research, spied for the Abwehr and collected data on the situation in Poland and its military potential.

The UWO had been handing over intelligence material to the Germans since 1922 in exchange for material support and naive political promises.

In 1922, members of the UWO, in accordance with the Ukrainian-German agreement, received training in the Reichswehr. A year later, a special training centre for Ukrainians was established in Munich, and in 1924 another one was organised to train saboteurs, terrorists and spies. Candidates for such training were selected by the Union of Ukrainian Officers in Germany (founded in 1921). In addition, training for Ukrainian commanders began in the Free City of Danzig from 1928, and the Abwehr also organised training courses in Czechoslovakia. Additional courses (for those who were to conduct intelligence and diversion in the USSR) were arranged in Königsberg, and were organised by the German Abwehrgruppe at the headquarters of the 1st Division in that city.

On 6 July 1926, during one of the UWO's meetings in Berlin (from that year on, the UWO's headquarters were located in that city), the attendees were informed that the Germans were expecting spy data from Ukrainian 'allies' concerning the Polish Army and the political and economic situation of the Second Republic. The informers were Ukrainians such as those serving in the Polish army, railwaymen, postal workers, clerks or forestry workers. The scale of Ukrainian espionage activity is evidenced by the fact that in 1928 alone, a hundred agents affiliated with the UWO were serving sentences in Polish prisons.

=== The Organization of Ukrainian Nationalists ===
In 1929, as a result of a merger of radical nationalist groups (including the UWO), the Organisation of Ukrainian Nationalists was formed. In July 1930, the UWO, together with the OUN, embarked on what they called a "second insurgency" - a terrorist and sabotage action against Poles and Ukrainians who wanted to have peace with the local Polish population. This was met with a reaction from the Polish government, which proceeded to pacify Eastern Lesser Poland. A wave of arrests of OUN activists in the summer of 1934 paralysed the organisation. An attempt to form branches was not made until July 1937. Vasyl Sydor formed 2 such squads (Wowky, consisting of 32 fighters, commanded by Vasyl Makar Siromanets, and a second squad of the same name), but they soon disbanded due to arrests.

After the Munich Agreement, the Third Reich, as part of its escalation of pressure on Poland (and in parallel the USSR), resumed contacts with the OUN, which had been suspended since 1934. As part of these, the Abwehr supported the organisation of Ukrainian paramilitary units (Carpathian Sich) in the area of Carpathian Ukraine, since autumn 1938 an autonomous third member of Czechoslovakia. As a result of an arrangement between the OUN Provod headed by Andriy Melnyk and the Abwehr, the Ukrainian Legion was formed in 1939. The Abwehr, led by Wilhelm Canaris, sought to instigate an anti-Polish uprising in Volhynia and Eastern Lesser Poland. Canaris was said to have persuaded Hitler to use the 'Ukrainian card' in the forthcoming war with Poland. The OUN leadership was also deluded into thinking that it would be able to carry out a 'National Revolution' in the Borderlands of the Second Polish Republic and create a 'Western Ukraine'.

From September 1938 to March 1939, there were 397 demonstrations, 47 acts of sabotage and 34 terrorist acts organised by nationalists. From 16 March to 12 April 1939 there were 59 demonstrations, 5 acts of sabotage and 21 acts of terror. The intensification of the OUN's actions was largely the result of inspiration from the Abwehr, which, on the brink of war, wanted to probe the real strength of an organisation it financed and considered an ally of Germany. The State Police carried out preventive arrests of OUN members and sympathisers.

In February 1939, Lev Rebet, fearing arrest, handed over the leadership of the national organisation to Myroslav Turash. On 21–23 March 1939, mass arrests took place, which were planned to liquidate the national leadership of the OUN. Among others, Rebet and more than 80 other independence organisation activists were detained. In Volyn voivodeship (as of 17 August 1939) 754 people were arrested (624 were imprisoned), in Lvov voivodeship (as of 1 July 1939) 1621 people suspected of OUN membership were arrested.

As Turash was killed crossing the Polish-Czechoslovak border on his return from abroad in June, Volodymyr Tymchiy became the national chairman of the OUN. He developed intensive preparations for the uprising. At that time, the OUN had around 8-9 thousand members, presumably the Yunactivists were comparably numerous. One could also count on a group of OUN sympathisers several times more numerous. In the summer of 1939, in at least 9 OUN districts out of the existing 18, forest training camps were set up with classes in firearms handling and tactics. Special groups were also formed to join the fight after the outbreak of war and were assigned tasks. Towards the end of August, groups of Ukrainian youths began to appear in the forests to protect themselves from mobilisation for the Polish Army (alert from 24 August, general mobilisation from 31 August).

Weapons for the anti-Polish uprising planned by the Nazis were to be flown overland via Slovakia or by air from East Prussia. The insurgents were to capture the Stryj-Nowy Sącz railway line and Podolia to ensure easy supply. It was in order to strengthen the uprising that the Ukrainian Legion was formed in Germany. It was assumed that the Legion would be reinforced by local OUN units and deserters from the Polish Army. A diversionary network of about 4,000 people was also organised locally, in the country.

The Germans estimated that 1,300 officers and 12,000 soldiers would be needed to trigger the uprising. This project was discussed by Roman Suszko and Colonel Erwin Lahousen between 13 June and 3 July 1939. However, the conclusion of the Molotov-Ribbentrop Pact on 23 August 1939, with the known hostility of the Soviet authorities to the Ukrainian independence movement, caused the Germans to abandon the use of Ukrainian troops and abandon the project of triggering an uprising.

== Implementation of the plan and attitudes of Ukrainians ==
German analysts feared that provoking a Ukrainian uprising in eastern Lesser Poland might trigger Soviet intervention, and the conflict would escalate into a European war. Adolf Hitler also feared that the arrival of the German army in Ukrainian lands would require some sort of German response to the Ukrainian question, and conflict with the USSR. The conclusion of the Molotov-Ribbentrop Pact relieved him of this problem. Rudolf Wiesner, on the other hand, proposed to Hitler to use the Galician Ukrainians in a similar way to the Sudeten Germans' speeches in Czechoslovakia, but Hitler feared Polish repression of the German minority in Poland. There was also an Abwehr proposal for the limited use, instead of the Ukrainian population, of armed diversionary groups composed of members of the OUN (K-Organisation Ost-Galizien).

On 23 August 1939, Germany signed an agreement with the USSR; on the same day, a decision was made by Germany not to use Ukrainian troops in the planned war.

On 24 August 1939, the members of the UNDO Supreme Committee unanimously passed a declaration to fulfil their civic duty towards the Polish state. On the basis of this declaration, on 2 September, Deputy Speaker Vasyl Mudryi declared in the Sejm the loyalty of the Ukrainian population to Poland. However, on the night of 1 to 2 September, on the orders of the Ministry of Internal Affairs, it began arresting Ukrainian activists and politicians and sending them to the camp at Bereza Kartuska. However, some of those arrested were released from 5 September onwards by the starosts, on the basis of their powers.

In addition to the NK UNDO, declarations of support from the Polish state authorities were made by the exile government of the Ukrainian People's Republic, Metropolitan Andrzej Szeptycki as the representative of the Ukrainian Greek Catholic Church, and Stepan Skrypnyk as the representative of the Ukrainians of Volhynia.

During the September campaign, between 106,314 and 111,910 Ukrainian soldiers served in the Polish Army. Of this number, at least 7,800 were killed and about 15,000 wounded. About 60,000 were taken prisoner by the Germans, and about 20,000 were taken prisoner by the Soviets.

== The Uprising ==
Just before the start of the Second World War, the Germans stopped the organisation of the anti-Polish OUN uprising because of the Molotov-Ribbentrop Pact. The USSR did not wish any actions by Ukrainians in an area that fell within its 'zone of interest', and the Third Reich did not want to irritate relations with its new ally. In addition, on the night of 1 to 2 September 1939, the Polish police, as part of arrests planned for the outbreak of war, detained several thousand Ukrainians suspected of links with nationalist organisations.

However, in view of the USSR's reluctance to promise aggression against Poland, the leadership of the Third Reich considered on 12 September a plan to launch an anti-Polish rebellion with the forces of the OUN, which in Adolf Hitler's plan was to lead to a bloody Polish counterinsurgency and ultimately to the murder of the Polish landed gentry by Ukrainian hands in a Polish-Ukrainian civil war. On 15 September, Wilhelm Canaris gave Andriy Melnyk conditional permission to launch an anti-Polish uprising. On 17 September, with the USSR's aggression against Poland, the German consent was no longer valid.

According to Ryszard Torzecki, citing undocumented claims by OUN-linked historian Petr Mirchuk in September 1939, the so-called Kraievyi Provid (Home Leadership) of the OUN, led by Lev Rebet, refused to carry out the order of the OUN Foreign Leadership (led by A. Melnyk) to initiate an anti-Polish uprising as a diversion in favour of Germany. Lev Rebet was said to have believed that, in view of the Molotov-Ribbentrop Pact, this would be an action solely in the interests of the USSR, which he regarded as the main enemy of Ukraine. Grzegorz Motyka and Krzysztof Łada doubt the possibility of the OUN refusing to launch an anti-Polish rebellion; in their opinion, the uprising was called off by the Germans themselves in the face of the Red Army's entry into the borders of the Second Republic of Poland.

From 12 September onwards, however, there were uncoordinated diversionary actions by armed OUN militias In the south-eastern provinces of Poland, most of them easily suppressed by the army and police (the first on the night of 12/13 September in Stryj). Their escalation occurred in the chaos following the entry of the Red Army.

On 6 September 1939, the 1st Battalion of the Lviv National Defence Brigade was redeployed to Mykolaiv, from where Ukrainian riots were reported. The town was decorated with Ukrainian flags, which the inhabitants took down when the army arrived. No riots were found, so the battalion returned to Lviv on the same day. On 10 September, Polish police were disarmed in Mykolayiv and 10 surrounding villages and mobilisation of Ukrainians began.

After 10 September 1939, when the situation of the Polish Army became unfavourable, the attitude of the OUN changed, there were numerous Ukrainian desertions and diversions, but the movement did not take mass form. This was also influenced by the evacuation of the Polish administration and the State Police. Under such conditions, the Ukrainian population began to organise their own riot squads.

The first clashes between the Ukrainian population and the Polish army took place near Jawornik Ruski and Rzęsna Ruska (the commune of Brzuchowice).

Larger actions against the Polish authorities took place on the night of 12–13 September. This date was associated with the arrival of German troops through Sambor deep into Eastern Lesser Poland. On that day, the siege of Lviv by the Wehrmacht began, which was perceived by local OUN militias as a signal to start fighting.

The uprisings and diversionary actions were suppressed by the forces of the Polish Army, especially after the capture of Stryj by OUN special groups on the night of 12–13 September, which had the character of a local uprising.

In the following days, similar OUN actions took place in mixed-nationality districts, with diversions taking place in Podhorce, Borysław, Truskawiec, Mraźnica, Zukotyn, Urycz, Szczerc, in the vicinity of Mikołów (a town and police station were seized) and Żydaczów, where 2 bridges (a road bridge in Demianka and a railway bridge in Rozwadów) were captured. On more than one occasion, the OUN's aim was to seize power in particular localities before the Soviet and German armies entered. There were also disarmings of Polish soldiers and even occasional skirmishes with retreating Polish Army and police units.

Against the diversionary activities, the Poles sent large forces of police and army. The Ukrainian uprisings in Mikolajiv and Zydacziv were thus suppressed, after fierce fighting but with heavy losses (e.g. in the battle for the village of Nadiatycze, the police lost 12 dead and 31 seriously wounded). Members of the OUN who were captured with guns were usually shot on the spot, e.g. 6 Ukrainians were shot in this way in the village of Duliby, while 40 Ukrainians were shot in Stryj. Villages from which shots were fired at WP patrols were usually burned. This triggered a counterattack by OUN militias. There were also cases of hostages being taken from the Ukrainian population, who were threatened with death if Polish units fired.

The next intensification of diversionary uprisings occurred after 17 September 1939, mainly in Volhynia and southern Polesia, but also in the Tarnopol and Stanislaw provinces. There was even a "minor uprising" in the districts of Brzeżany and Podhajec.

The OUN fighters mainly murdered Polish settlers, disarmed soldiers and ordinary local peasants. Some of the local population also took part in the actions, as well as communist militias and the margins of society, e.g. in the villages of Koniuchy and Potutory a total of around 100 Poles were murdered. and in Kolonia Jakubowice 57 homesteads were burnt down and around 20 Poles were murdered. In the village of Slawentyn in Podhajce district, a further 85 people were killed.

== Aftermath ==
In total, about 2,000 Poles were murdered in actions against Polish civilians in September and October 1939 in Eastern Lesser Poland and about 1,000 in Volhynia. Due to some Ukrainian insurgencies being suppressed in some villages and cities the uprising was partially suppressed by the Polish Army and Police. However the areas quickly became occupied by the Red Army as part of the Soviet invasion of Poland.

From August 29 to September 23, 1939, 7,729 people, mainly military groups of the OUN, took part in the sabotage actions of the OUN special units. These actions covered 183 Polish cities. The insurgents of Ouniv captured one tank, several planes and guns, 23 heavy and 80 light machine guns, 3,757 rifles, 3,445 guns, and 25 vehicles. 3,610 Poles were captured by the Germans, 769 were killed, and 37 were wounded. Mainly as a result of the actions of the Polish Army and the police, Ukrainians lost 160 killed and 53 wounded. In Polish retaliatory actions 5 villages were burned.

The uprising became the main prelude for the Polish-Ukrainian ethnic conflict during World War II which would result in the massacres of Poles in Volhynia and Eastern Galicia, as well as reprisal massacres against Ukrainians by Poles.

== See also ==
- Ukrainian collaboration with Nazi Germany
- Massacres of Poles in Volhynia and Eastern Galicia
- Reichskommissariat Ukraine
