= Andrew Wilson (historian) =

English political scientist (born 1961)

Andrew Wilson (born 1961) is a British historian and political scientist specializing in Eastern Europe, particularly Ukraine. He is a Senior Policy Fellow at the European Council on Foreign Relations, and Professor in Ukrainian studies at the School of Slavonic and East European Studies at University College London. He wrote The Ukrainians: The Story of How a People Became a Nation (the first four editions were titled The Ukrainians: An Unexpected Nation) and Virtual Politics: Faking Democracy in the Post-Soviet World.

Wilson is a member of the Ukraine Today media organization's International Supervisory Council.

He was born in Cumbria, England.

== Works ==
- Ukraine: Perestroika to Independence (with Taras Kuzio), New York, St. Martin's Press, 1994, xiv, 260p. ISBN 0-312-08652-0.
- Ukrainian Nationalism in the 1990s: A Minority Faith. Cambridge: Cambridge University Press. 1996. ISBN 0-521-57457-9.
- The Ukrainians: The Story of How a People Became a Nation, New Haven: Yale University Press, 2000, 2015, xviii, 366p. ISBN 0-300-08355-6, 2nd edition 2002 ISBN 0-300-09309-8, 3rd edition 2009 ISBN 978-0300154764, 4th edition 2015 ISBN 978-0300217254, 5th edition 2022 ISBN 978-0300269406.
- Virtual Politics: Faking Democracy in the Post-Soviet World, Yale University Press, 2005, ISBN 0-300-09545-7.
- Ukraine's Orange Revolution, Yale University Press, 2005, ISBN 0-300-11290-4.
- Belarus: The Last European Dictatorship, Yale University Press, 2012, ISBN 978-0-300-13435-3.
- Ukraine Crisis: What it Means for the West, Yale University Press, 2014, ISBN 978-0-300-21159-7.
