= Dmytro Dontsov =

Ukrainian nationalist writer, publisher, journalist, and ideologist

- Дмитро Донцов
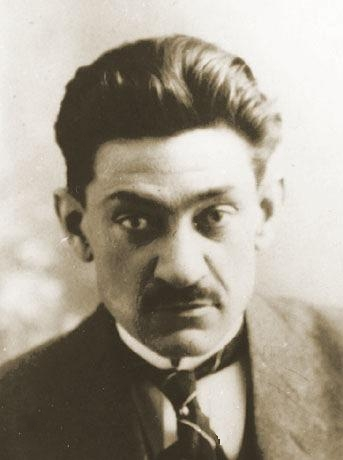
- Dontsov before 1925
- Born: 30 August 1883; Melitopol, Taurida Governorate, Russian Empire
- Died: 30 March 1973 (aged 89); Montreal, Quebec, Canada
- Education: Saint Petersburg University
- Occupations: Ukrainian nationalist writer, publisher, journalist, political thinker, activist, literary critic
- Spouse: Maria Bachynska (m. 1912)
- Writing career
- Pen name: O.V.
- Language: Ukrainian
- Movement: Integral nationalism

Signature
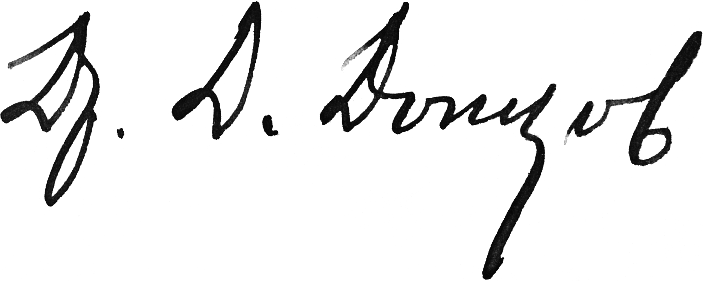

Dmytro Ivanovych Dontsov (Ukrainian: Дмитро Іванович Донцов; 29 August [O.S. 17 August] 1883 – 30 March 1973) was a Ukrainian nationalist writer, publisher, journalist and ideologist. Dontsov fundamentally influenced the emergence of a radical wing of the Ukrainian nationalist movement (Note: In his book The Turn to the Right, Alexander J. Motyl terms this "Ukrainian Nationalism". Contemporary scholars have referred to it as "radical Ukrainian nationalism".) in the 1920s and developed his own brand of radical Ukrainian nationalism. His ideas and writings strongly influenced the Organisation of Ukrainian Nationalists, particularly the Banderite faction.

Dontsov preached a separation of Ukraine from Russia and a reorientation towards the West. He termed his ideological programme "active nationalism" (chynnyi natsionalizm) and extolled an "initiative minority" modelled on the examples of Italian fascism and Bolshevism. In the 1930s, Dontsov became heavily influenced by fascism and Nazism and republished works by fascist politicians and ideologues.

Dontsov's ethnic nationalism was rejected by the Ukrainian intelligentsia in the postwar years, though he remains highly regarded among the Ukrainian far-right.

== Biography ==
=== Early life and education ===
Dontsov was born in Melitopol, in the Taurida Governorate of the Russian Empire — territory referred to by the authorities as part of Novorossiya and now within Zaporizhzhia Oblast, Ukraine. His mother, Efrosinia Iosifovna Dontsova, was Ukrainian and his father, Ivan Dmitrievich Dontsov, was a Russian entrepreneur who was elected to the city duma in 1873 and appointed mayor in 1894. His father died of an apparent heart attack on the eve of his inauguration when Dontsov was eleven.

His mother, who had Italian and German ancestry, died the following year from an illness. As a result, Dontsov was largely raised by his German step-grandfather. Dmytro and his two younger sisters adopted a Ukrainian identity, while his two brothers, Vladimir and Sergei, chose Russian identities. (Note: Vladimir joined the Bolshevik underground while Sergei pursued a career in the Russian imperial bureaucracy. Vladimir was later arrested alongside his son in 1938 on charges falsely connected to Dontsov and executed while his son (Dontsov's nephew) perished in a labour camp in 1943.)

In 1900, Dontsov moved to Saint Petersburg where he completed gymnasium and enrolled at Saint Petersburg University to study law. In 1905, he joined the Ukrainian Social-Democratic Labor Party (USDRP) where he met Symon Petliura, editor of the magazine Slovo which published Dontsov's first articles.

He was arrested for participating in a pro-Ukrainian demonstration during the Russian Revolution of 1905 and briefly imprisoned in Kyiv. After his release, he settled in the city and continued to contribute news and editorials for both Slovo and the Russian-language liberal Ukrainskaia zhizn (Ukrainian Life; also edited by Petliura). Following the Stolypin Coup in 1907, which intensified Russification and repression of dissent, Dontsov was arrested again and imprisoned in Kyiv. After eight months' imprisonment he escaped abroad to Lviv in April 1908, then part of the Austro-Hungarian Empire.

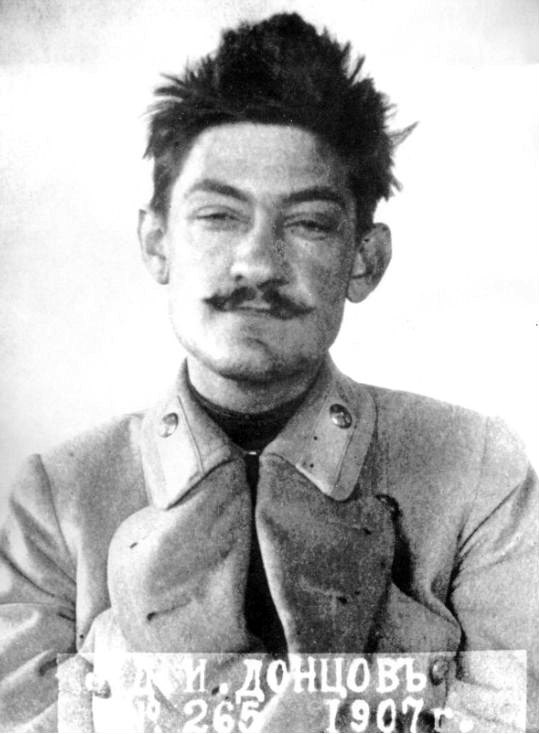
Dontsov's mug shot from his 1907 arrest.

Recovering from a chronic illness contracted during his imprisonment, Dontsov moved to a resort town in the Tatra Mountains where he became acquainted with Vyacheslav Lypynsky, a leading theorist of Ukrainian conservativism and a pro-independence monarchist. At this time, Dontsov opposed the notion of Ukrainian independence and supported a federalist vision of Ukraine as an autonomous part of a social-democratic Russia, believing in the possibility of coordination between the USDRP and its Russian counterpart. He advocated a platform closer to the Russian Bolshevik faction on everything but the national question in relation to Ukraine.

Dontsov moved to Vienna in 1908 where he studied law, economics, and history at the University of Vienna until 1911 before settling in Lviv in 1912. In May of that year, he married Mariia Bachynska (later Bachynska-Dontsova), a fellow student he had met in Vienna in 1909. Bachynska was a pro-Ukrainian activist, feminist, and public intellectual from a wealthy family. Fluent in German, she provided translation services for Dontsov and the later Hetmanate. (Note: From 1926 to 1927 she headed the Ukrainian Women's Union, but was eventually ousted due to her association with Dontsov and his controversial political writings.) Writing about the movement to establish a Ukrainian university in Lviv, Dontsov observed in 1911: "Moreover, the history of the struggle for a Ukrainian university proves for the hundredth time that in politics it is the argument of force, not the force of argument, that matters."

Disillusioned with Marxism's utopian promises, Dontsov developed a Russophobic worldview rooted in Realpolitik. He advocated Ukraine's alignment with Mitteleuropa as an Austro-Hungarian protectorate in what he saw the inevitable clash between what he cast as the “progressive” West and “reactionary” East. He first expressed these views in a pamphlet titled Moderne moskvofilstvo (Modern Muscophilism) that earned him fame and notoriety among politically active Ukrainians and Russians in Lviv and elicited accusations of mazepynstvo ('Mazepism'). Dontsov presented this political programme, centred on complete separation from Russia and in which he condemned the 'Little Russian' orientation of the Ukrainian intelligentsia, at the Second All-Ukrainian Students' Congress in July 1913. His speech was subsequently transcribed in the pamphlet Suchasne politychne polozhennia natsiï i nashi zavdannia (The Present Political Situation of the Nation and Our Tasks). The work brought him notoriety for its radical stance and led to his ostracism from the USDRP, which he castigated for placing faith in Russian liberalism's supposed commitment to self-determination, a commitment which he characterised as subterfuge. Vladimir Lenin denounced Dontsov's speech as "nationalist philistinism", though he attacked Russian liberals for their displays of contempt for Ukrainian national aspirations. (Note: According to historian Trevor Erlacher, Lenin himself regarded the right to national self-determination as merely a tactical concession.)

=== First World War and Ukrainian War of Independence (1914–1921) ===
At the outset of the First World War in 1914, Dontsov became a founding member of the pro-Austrian Union for the Liberation of Ukraine before leaving in September (Note: In 1915, Dontsov was publicly denounced by a leader of the SVU as "tactless", "uncooperative", and "unsuited to organised political activity" while he in turn had denounced the predominantly left-wing SVU in a June 1915 article.) to head the Ukrainian Parliamentary Club and its press bureau in Vienna that distributed pro-Ukrainian, pro-Central Powers, and anti-Russian propaganda. His German language brochures initially circulated widely in diplomatic circles concerned with the 'Ukrainian question' though this would practically amount to little due to Austrian reluctance to offend its Polish subjects. Dontsov relocated with the League of Russian Foreign Peoples (LFR) [de] to Lausanne, Switzerland in mid-1916 where he was one of the signatories of an appeal to President Woodrow Wilson on the grounds of self-determination. He was subsequently recruited by the German Foreign Office to head the LFR's press operations in Bern, publishing pro-Ukrainian independence propaganda in German, French, and English. Amid tensions with members of the LFR surrounding his editorship, Dontsov moved back to Lviv in 1917 where he completed his doctorate in law.

Opposed to the initially pacifist, federalist, and Ukrainophile Central Rada that would found the Ukrainian People's Republic (UPR) in March 1917 following the February Revolution, and thus starting the Ukrainian War of Independence, Dontsov joined the Ukrainian Democratic Agrarian Party (UDKhP) founded by Lypynsky and quickly rose through its ranks. Dontsov returned to Kyiv in March 1918 by which time the Bread Peace had seen the Central Powers recognise the UPR and the German Empire militarily occupy Ukraine in return for deliveries of grain to the Austro-Hungarian Empire. However, the Central Rada's socialist agrarian reforms interfered with these deliveries and lowered productivity, leading the German military authorities to conspire with the UDKhP to effect a coup d'état in April that installed the Ukrainian State under Hetman Pavlo Skoropadskyi.

In May, Dontsov joined Skoropadskyi's government as director of the Ukrainian Telegraph Agency (UTA) and press bureau, overseeing the production and dissemination of news and pro-Hetmanate propaganda. From the summer of 1918 onwards, Dontsov led the Hetmanate's Ukrainisation efforts aimed at drumming up support for the government. Skoropadskyi regularly consulted Dontsov on matters of Russification and the regime's relationship with the Germans, Bolsheviks, Russians, and peasants, directing him to set up Selianske slovo (Village Word) in an effort to appeal to the latter group. Dontsov advocated for Crimea as an "integral part of Ukraine". Outraged at the federal union proclaimed in November between the Hetmanate and White Russia, Dontsov resigned from the UTA and went into hiding following the appearance of an order for his arrest as the Anti-Hetman Uprising broke out.

Despite his support for the uprising and his friendship with Petliura, Dontsov strongly opposed the new socialist regime and, returning to the UTA, advised the Directorate to grant Petliura emergency dictatorial powers. On receiving news that the White Volunteers had placed a bounty on his head, Dontsov departed to Paris in early January 1919 as part of the UPR's diplomatic mission to the Versailles peace talks. He remained with the delegation for ten days before departing to meet Lypynsky and Yevhen Konovalets in Vienna in order to develop a military and political strategy going forward, with Konovalets attempting to construct a unit out of Ukrainian POW's. Dontsov and Lypynsky coordinated their propaganda efforts from the latter's Ukrainian Bureau but they disagreed on the way forward ideologically and geopolitically with Dontsov opposed to what he saw as the Hetmanite movement's pro-Russian tendencies and Lypynsky opposed to an alignment with a resurgent Poland. In mid-February, and following the fall of Kyiv, Dontsov left for Bern to once again head the UPR's now-exiled press bureau, (Note: Bachynska-Dontsova meanwhile travelled to Copenhagen to work for the UPR's diplomatic mission to Denmark.) with efforts later focused on attempting to secure the UPR's place at the Treaty of Riga negotiations that concluded in 1921 with the partition of Ukrainian lands primarily between Poland and the Bolsheviks.

=== Interwar period (1921–1939) ===
Having advocated that Ukraine become a part of Józef Piłsudski's Intermarium project, portraying it as a cordon sanitaire against the Bolsheviks who he regarded as an insidious reincarnation of Russian imperialism, Dontsov was granted permanent settlement in Lviv, personally approved by Piłsudski. In 1921, Dontsov published his first book, Pidstavy nashoї polityky (The Foundations of Our Politics), in which he presented a political ideology he termed 'active nationalism' (chynnyi natsionalizm) and which largely resembled integral nationalism in a Ukrainian context, arguing for the subordination of individual, class, and humanitarian interests to the biological survival of the nation. (Note: In the preface of the book, Donstov claimed that he had been espousing the same ideas since 1907.) Criticising the Hetman movement, Dontsov advocated for the Ukrainian peasantry as the necessary basis for any nation-building, insisting that if guided by a philosophy matching its temperament and traditions, the peasantry was capable of building a society strong enough to "save Europe from Muscovite barbarism". He blamed Ukrainophilism and Ukrainian conservatism for the failure of the revolution and envisaged a social Darwinian, agrarian, and authoritarian democracy grounded in self-discipline and self-action.

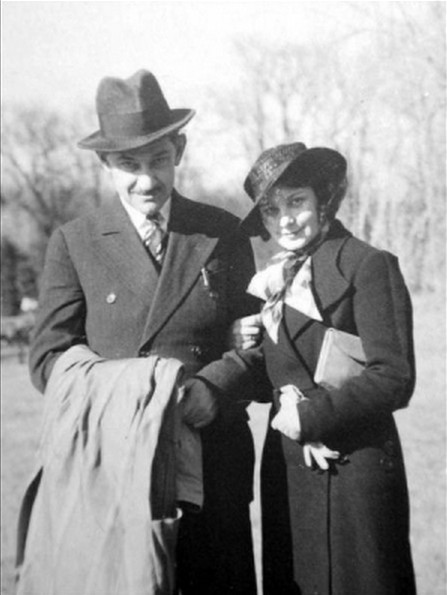
Dontsov and Teliha, late 1930s.

Dontsov became closely connected to the Ukrainian Military Organisation (UVO) though avoided Polonophobic rhetoric and even motioned for an alliance with Poland at the UVO's founding congress in August 1920 which was blocked by Konovalets and Yevhen Petrushevych. With Konovalets's support, Dontsov became chief editor of the Literaturno-naukovyi vistnyk (Literary-Scientific Herald, hereon LNV) in 1922, reshaping it from an impartial non-partisan forum into a vehicle for his nationalist views and what he presented as a Ukrainian nationalist cultural renaissance. Contributors to the LNV included poets, novelists, literary critics, and scholars, among them Olena Teliha, Oleh Olzhych, and Ulas Samchuk.

The LNV became successful among the new generation of Ukrainian nationalists with Konovalets describing Dontsov as the "spiritual dictator of Galician youth"— Stepan Bandera and Roman Shukhevych, as members of a Ukrainian nationalist youth organisation that recommended Dontsov's works, organised public readings of the LNV in Lviv. In a 1923 article, Dontsov extolled Bolshevism and Italian Fascism as models of a ruthless 'initiative minority' on which to base the Ukrainian nationalist movement and assumed anti-democratic positions. The Tyutyunnyk affair that year saw Dontsov for several months publish anti-Petliura and anti-Polish materials in Zahrava, (Note: Literally translating to 'a glow or radiance on the horizon'.) another publication he edited, purportedly written by Yuriy Tyutyunnyk but who was actually under the coercion of the Ukrainian branch of the GPU. Dontsov himself had written several criticisms of the Polish establishment and maintained close connections with the nationalist underground for which the embarrassing affair was used as a pretext to threaten him with deportation to the Ukrainian SSR, leading him to agree to adhere to a pro-Polish agenda.

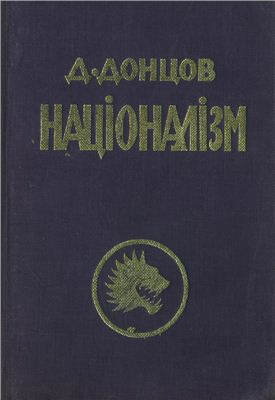
The cover of Natsionalizm, depicting a 'Dontsov beast' [ukr].

In 1926 Dontsov published his most famous work Natsionalizm (Nationalism), which prescribed a value system of active nationalism encompassing the "law of struggle", amorality, fanaticism, romanticism, dogmatism, creative violence, and an initiative minority. The book became a political gospel for Dontsov's supporters and he thereafter became an idol of the Ukrainian nationalistic youth in Poland, Czechoslovakia, and the rest of Europe.

Dontsov's refusal to cooperate with the UVO and later the Organisation of Ukrainian Nationalists (founded in 1929 and hereon the OUN) in spite of the degree to which his works inspired its members fostered mutual suspicion whereby the exiled executive leadership sought to regain control over the outbreak of unsanctioned political violence in Galicia. OUN ideologues criticised Dontsov's ideology throughout the 1930s, most significantly leading to a heated polemic between Dontsov and Volodomyr Martynets, editor of the OUN's ideological journal Rozbudova natsiï (Building the Nation), during the summer of 1930. That June, Dontsov rebuked the Provid (the émigré leadership of the OUN) for not morally supporting the LNV. In response to the Ukrainian Greek Catholic Church's outspoken criticism of his politics and the effect it was having on Galician youth in the early 1930s, Dontsov adopted anti-clerical positions.

A dwindling readership and a crisis in contributing authors who clashed with Dontsov's authoritarian editorship led to the demise of the LNV in 1932, later restarted under the name Vistnyk (Herald) in 1933 with the financial support of the UVO and Bachynska-Dontsova. With Adolf Hitler's rise to power that year, Dontsov enthusiastically supported the new Chancellor and advocated for an alignment with Nazi Germany. The rise of Nazism reflected a triumph of Dontsov's ideas whereafter it exerted a significant influence on his writings, deepening his obsession with 'International Jewry' that had largely been inflamed by the 1927 Schwartzbard trial to the point where antisemitic themes began to appear in almost all his articles. By the spring of 1939, Dontsov's antisemitic writings were closely aligned to those of Hitler. In the final issue of Vistnyk for September, Dontsov reacted with puzzlement to the Molotov-Ribbentrop Pact and published the article Zhydivske pytannia i natsional-sotsializm (The Jewish Question and National Socialism) that had the stated aim of popularising Hitler's teachings in Mein Kampf.

=== Second World War (1939–1945) ===
Due to his pro-Nazi views and connections to the Ukrainian nationalist underground, Dontsov was arrested and briefly imprisoned in Bereza Kartuska Prison at the outset of the German invasion of Poland in September 1939, dissolving Vistnyk, before the prison was abandoned and its inmates released upon the news of the Soviet invasion from the east. After this, Bachynska-Dontsova initiated a divorce for reasons still debated by historians. Dontsov fled via Kraków to Berlin, then to Danzig, and finally Bucharest where he lived with and was financially supported (for the remainder of his life) by Ukrainian biologist Yurii Rusov and his wife, Nataliia Gerken-Rusova, an artist and playwright who had been a key contributor to Vistnyk. Dontsov worked with the couple to publish Batava which ran until November 1941 and where Dontsov, influenced by Rusov, deepened his interest in scientific racism, dividing the Ukrainian population into stratified racial castes: Nordic, Mediterranean, Dinaric, and Oriental. Due to Rusov's position as editor, Dontsov also contributed to the Hetmanite publication Ukraïnskyi robitnyk (Ukrainian Worker).

Following the German invasion of the Soviet Union, Dontsov moved to Nazi-occupied Prague in late 1941 where he contributed to the SS-operated Reinhard Heydrich Institute [de], founded in July 1942 after Heydrich's assassination two months earlier. Dontsov continued espousing pro-Nazi views despite the violent crackdown on OUN members in Ukraine, some of whom he had had close relationships with as contributors to the LNV and Vistnyk. He opposed the OUN-B's presentation of a liberal democratic platform in 1943 in private correspondence with the organisation's leadership, writing that "the OUN should stand against imperialist powers, including Jewry, but not against imperialism". He complained that the new programme was bereft of what he saw as Ukrainian historical traditions with regard to Cossackdom, xenophobia, and antisemitism.

=== Post-war exile ===
With the advance of the Red Army, Dontsov left Prague for the American occupation zone in early 1945 from where he travelled to Paris and then to London in 1946, before moving to New York in 1947. Later that year, he crossed the border into Canada on a tourist visa and, despite a public investigation into his wartime activities, was permitted to settle in Montreal where he taught Ukrainian literature at the French-language Université de Montréal from 1949 to 1952.

Dontsov attempted to promote his Russophobic anti-communist views in speaking tours but found himself a pariah in much of the Ukrainian diaspora in large part because of the pro-Nazi and fascist views he espoused before and during the war but he was also perceived as a faithless, hypocritical coward by many nationalists due to his alignment with the Nazis despite the deaths of Teliha, Olzhych and other nationalists, who had followed his teachings, from their hand.

Dontsov's activities in postwar exile consisted of him writing extensively for the Ukrainian émigré press, mainly in publications associated with the OUN-B. Stepan Bandera remained in contact with Dontsov throughout the 1950s, offering him the role of editor in his organisation's newspaper which Dontsov declined. In his later years Dontsov became a devotee of theosophy, repackaging his worldview pertaining to the Soviet Union for a Christian fundamentalist audience during the Cold War and excised pro-Nazi and antisemitic elements from his republished works. Dontsov argued that the Cold War should become a holy war against the Satanic Soviet Union and that, since a Third World War was inevitable, the West should strike preemptively. Following Bandera's assassination, Dontsov published an obituary in a November 1959 issue of OUN-B periodical Homin Ukraїny in which he praised Bandera as the embodiment of a principled anti-democratic, anti-communist fighter.

=== Death ===
Dontsov died on 30 March 1973 in Montreal, aged 89, and is buried in the Ukrainian Orthodox Cemetery in Bound Brook, New Jersey. Yaroslav Stetsko presided over his wake which was attended, among others, by former members of the UPA and representatives from Ukrainian diaspora organisations, including the World Congress of Free Ukrainians, the Organisation for the Defense of Four Freedoms for Ukraine, and the Ukrainian Canadian Congress.

== Ideology and style ==
Across his life, Dontsov went through different contradictory phases and periods of political orientation and never presented his ideas in the form of a logically consistent doctrine. Historian Taras Kurylo considers Dontsov to have instead created a "mosaic of what he considered the most important". In formulating active nationalism, Dontsov borrowed much from the likes of Friedrich Nietzsche, Johann Gottlieb Fichte, Vilfredo Pareto, and Georges Sorel. According to historian Oleksandr Zaitsev, Dontsov was also influenced by the writings and ideas of Arthur Schopenhauer, Oswald Spengler, Henri Bergson, Maurice Barrès, Charles Maurras, Gustave Le Bon, and Gaetano Mosca, with Nietzsche remaining the greatest influence on his works. In the 1920s, Dontsov admired nations and leaders who inhabited his principles of will power, resolution, hierarchy, voluntarism, ruthlessness, mercilessness, belligerency, zeal, and amorality. In his writing this encompassed Fascist Italy, the British Empire, Imperial Japan, and the United States, of which he especially admired the effective colonisation of the Wild West. He argued that to defeat the Bolsheviks, Ukrainian nationalists would need to adopt its methods.

In a style more typical of the Russian intelligentsia of the time, Dontsov mixed literature and politics and, according to Ivan L. Rudnytsky, exhibited a doctrinaire turn of mind that resorted to simple reductionist formulas accompanied by radical solutions. Critics of Dontsov at the time and since have asserted that he did more to import Russian culture and thought into Ukrainian culture than anyone else during the interwar period, with his contemporaries often citing his Russian background to the extent that it plagued his career in Western Ukraine.

Trevor Erlacher characterises Dontsov's personality and his body of work as 'iconoclastic authoritarianism', asserting that he "readily sacrificed logic and consistency for the sake of emotive impact or political expedience, vulgarized the ideas of the writers whom he invoked to fit the rhetorical needs of the moment, and moved chameleonlike between political, cultural, and philosophical trends". Erlacher describes Dontsov's seminal 1926 work Natsionalizm as being "a collection of impressions and expressions designed to have an emotional effect and undermine the reader's trust in reason", going on to write that "[p]atent falsehoods, such as Dontsov's misrepresentation of the Ukrainian anarchist Drahomanov as a "convinced Russian statist," either evade detection and are accepted prima facie, or anger the reader and turn them immediately against the book".

According to Alexander J. Motyl, supporters of Dontsov have generally focused on his contributions to the formation of a Ukrainian national identity while his detractors and critics focus on his totalitarian tendencies. Volodymyr Yaniv, writing for the Encyclopedia of Ukraine, asserts that Dontsov "made a decisive contribution to the undermining of Russophilism and the influence of Communist ideas in Western Ukraine in the 1920s". Yaniv characterises Dontsovism as voluntarist and pantheistic monism.

=== Fascism ===
According to historians Oleksandr Zaitsev, Taras Kurylo, and John-Paul Himka, Dontsov and Vistnyk in the 1930s became the main popularisers of National Socialism and Italian Fascism among Ukrainians in Poland and the diaspora. Dontsov translated and published extracts of Mein Kampf and La dottrina del fascismo as well as reprinting works by Nazi ideologues Joseph Goebbels, Alfred Rosenberg, and Hans Günther. According to Zaitsev, Dontsov's articles in Vistnyk were replete with quotations from Mussolini and Hitler, with him publishing biographies of the two dictators as well as Léon Degrelle and François de La Rocque.

Kurylo and Himka consider Dontsov by the late 1930s to have formulated a "Ukrainian version of fascism". Zaitsev considers Dontsov's ideas to be closer to those of the Conservative Revolution, (Note: The Conservative Revolution is sometimes considered a form of "non-Nazi fascism" in line with Roger Griffin's interpretation.) though he notes that the palingenetic myth played a significant role in his ideology with his 1944 work Dukh nashoï davnyny (The Spirit of Our Antiquity) being the best example of this. He characterises the output of Vistnyk as constituting literary fascism rather than its political counterpart due to its indirect impact on events, describing it as a form of proto-fascism "in which national imperialism was bizarrely combined with anti-colonial discourse and the pathos of national liberation".

Dontsov's active nationalism has commonly been ascribed as a Ukrainian form of integral nationalism in the historiography. Some historians, such as Per Anders Rudling and Grzegorz Rossoliński-Liebe, object to this classification of Ukrainian radical nationalism, noting that integral nationalism is itself a proto-fascist ideology or arguing that it is indistinguishable from fascism. Zaitsev considers this position to be not without foundation though asserts the view that such a designation is of limited heuristic value.

=== Feud with Vyacheslav Lypynsky ===
Though they had their differences Dontsov and Vyacheslav Lypynsky initially worked closely together, remaining on good terms until the early 1920s by which point their views had diverged considerably. Where Lypynsky saw the need for nation-building to be driven by an aristocracy and denounced the peasantry as an impoverished mass more interested in anarchy than building strong political institutions and a stable civil society, Dontsov argued for a peasantry imbued with an irrational will to power and led by a nationalist political elite. Dontsov subscribed to the populist myth of a homogenous peasantry and argued for an ethnically homogenous nation cleansed of foreign influences while Lypynsky viewed greater social differentiation as a source of stability, championing territorial nationalism.

Dontsov attempted to provoke Lypynsky several times in 1925, attacking the centrality of legalism to his thinking and denying his commitment to Ukrainian independence. Lypynsky responded in a letter to the New Jersey newspaper Svoboda:

"I know you Ukrainian intelligentsia snakes too well to be surprised by these lies, to have any desire to answer them, or to engage in polemics with you. Keep lying. The more your lies besmirch the Ukrainian name, which you yourselves represent, the more your baseness will drive away all honest Ukrainians, and the sooner the branch on which you sit will fall, and you boors will die, blinded by your own spite."

The polemic that ensued after the publishing of Natsionalizm in 1926 became highly acrimonious and personal and served as one of the main themes of discussion among Ukrainian nationalists going forward. Lypynsky wrote of Dontsov's works in the early 1920s:

"His writings are so contradictory that he would have gone mad long ago if he had treated them even a little seriously. Fortunately for himself, he only "writes" them"

Andrew Wilson describes Dontsov and Lypynsky as the two most influential Ukrainian nationalist thinkers of the twentieth century, with their feud symptomatic of a wider clash of ideas between democratic and militant nationalism that remained relevant to modern Ukrainian politics.

== Views ==
=== Russia ===
Dontsov biographer Trevor Erlacher portrays his Russophobia as finding its origins in intolerance and chauvinism he supposedly experienced from Russian classmates as a schoolboy and in Saint Petersburg literary circles, hardened by his encounters with the imperial authorities. Erlacher casts Dontsov's opposition to Russian imperialism as the singular constant in his body of work, noting that he at the same time admired other imperial powers and celebrated the principle of conquest through war.

During his time in Kyiv from 1905 to 1907, Dontsov developed a lifelong fascination with the medieval Kyivan Rus' whereby he came to view Russia as a crude imposter. He thereafter viewed Russia and Europe as two antithetical civilisations, in his 1921 book promoting hatred of and struggle against Russia as a basis for the politics, literature, and spirituality of Ukraine and the wider Western world. His polemic of Russian culture based itself in its supposed Mongol origins that engendered barbarism whereby he presented his Weltanschauung as a struggle between European and Asiatic civilisation, with Ukrainians responsible for whatever was European in Muscovite culture.

From 1926 to 1933 he began to argue that Bolshevism was the latest manifestation of an Asiatic, Jewish-Muscovite essence that arose out of the "racial chaos" of the Mongol khanates. According to Erlacher, in the latter half of his life Dontsov exhibited a pathological hatred of Russians and openly fantasised about genocidal vengeance at any cost. In Batava (published from 1940 to 1941), Dontsov characterised 'Oriental', the lowest racial caste in his system, as a Tatar-Mongol-Russian mix that corrupted the Ukrainian gene pool with slavish, disorderly traits. Though he would in exile remove overtly antisemitic and pro-Nazi passages from his republished works, his sections on race science remained.

=== Jews ===
Alongside his brother Vladimir, Dontsov supported Jewish self-defense groups against pogroms in the Russian Empire prior to moving to Saint Petersburg in 1900. (Note: Vladimir would be forced to flee Melitopol in 1905 following his participation in a self-defense group during a pogrom.) In 1910 he criticised ethnographer Olena Pchilka for spreading "antisemitic and religious fog" and "nationalist demagoguery" though by 1918 he had come to regard Ukrainian Jews as fifth columnists, inherently pro-Russian, pro-Bolshevik, and anti-Ukrainian. In response to a complaint by the German military authorities regarding his editorship at the UTA, Dontsov claimed that he was "between a hammer and an anvil" with the "Jewish-Russian press" on one side and the Germans on the other.

In his 1921 book Dontsov criticised Judeo-Bolshevism conspiracy theories, insisting that Bolshevism was principally a Russian phenomenon while also arguing that the Jewish working class had sided with the Russian Bolsheviks because of their racial psychology and class interests. Reacting to Petliura's murder in 1926, Dontsov asserted that "the Jew is not guilty of everything" but were "terribly guilty" of serving Russian imperialism and Bolshevism. The following line where he states "Only when Russia falls in Ukraine will we be able to settle the Jewish question in our country in a way that suits the interest of the Ukrainian people" has been interpreted by historians one of two ways. It has been interpreted as either a threat to the Ukrainian Jewish population and damning proof of his radical antisemitism as early as 1926 or as proof of his pragmatism towards Ukraine's Jews at this point, with the 'Jewish question' remaining secondary to Russia— historian Trevor Erlacher asserts that there is some truth to both interpretations. Reacting to the 1927 Schwartzbard trial, Dontsov denied that the pogroms had taken place, blaming Jews for having been hostile toward Ukrainians and asserting that they were motivated by a desire to rule and exploit Ukraine. He wrote that Petliura's mistake was that he "wanted to win the support of a cowardly and slavish race with concessions". Responding to a wave of antisemitic policies in Nazi Germany, Dontsov wrote in April 1933:

"We do not need to adopt Hitler's methods. But we must remember that a people cannot allow itself to be ruled (politically or spiritually) by an alien element and that this alien element dare not, as is now the case in [Soviet] Ukraine, be the master of our land."

Throughout the 1930s antisemitic tropes appeared in almost all of Dontsov's articles in Vistnyk, often in the form of citing Jewish names to assert the Judeo-Bolshevism conspiracy theory. Dontsov also promoted the world Jewish conspiracy theory— for instance, in a 1934 article he wrote that to prevent the future state from becoming a "Ukraine of the Schwartzbards", the Ukrainian elite "should not be members of a people (or sect) that receives directives... from international Jewry, which actively supported Bolshevism and the expropriation of our peasants for the benefit of their race". Dontsov came to regard antisemitism as a Ukrainian tradition, in a 1937 article faulting the Ukrainian leaders of 1917-1921 for failing to take advantage of the Judeophobic sentiments of the Ukrainian masses. In a 1938 article, he criticised the most outlandish of conspiracy theories surrounding 'International Jewry', subscribing instead to a view of Jews as a "parasitic phenomenon" secondary to the Russian Bolsheviks. In The Riddle of the Third Reich published a few months before the start of the Second World War, Dontsov aligned himself with Hitler's view of Germany and extolled him and his entourage as a model for Ukrainian nationalists to follow, writing that, in spite of "Israel's millions of dollars", "Israel had to bow its neck" before the new German faith and power.

Despite Dontsov's revision of his republished works, he maintained a keen personal interest in antisemitic conspiracy theories, as evidenced by his personal papers which contain heavily underlined conspiratorial brochures and newspaper clippings in the margins of which he frequently scribbled "Jew" where his opponents in the media were Jewish.

== Legacy ==
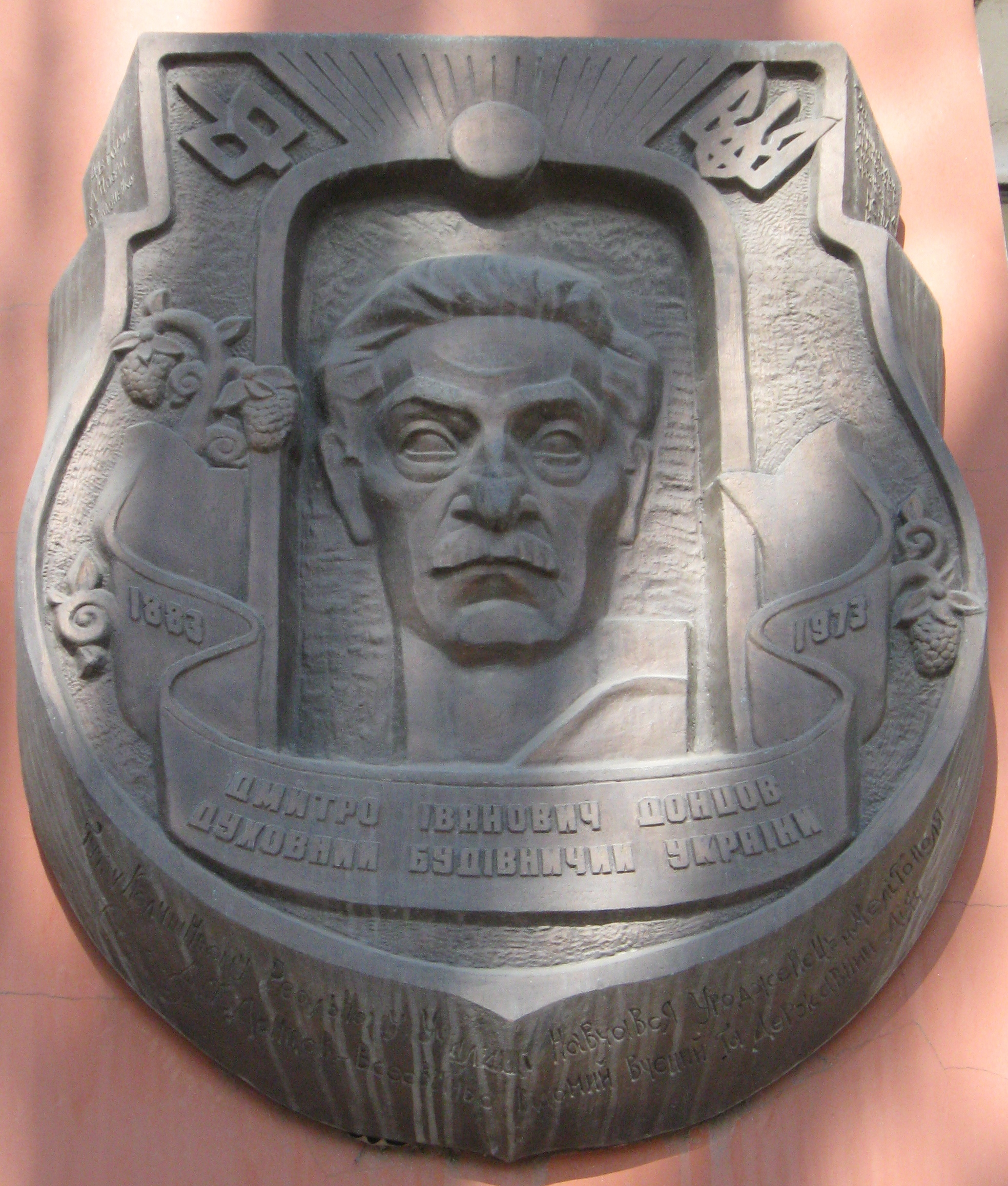
Commemorative plaque in Melitopol, removed in 2022.

Dontsov has been regarded as the "spiritual father" of the UVO and OUN by nationalists and his ideas remained influential in the émigré OUN-B and Anti-Bolshevik Bloc of Nations during the Cold War era. In his later years, Yaroslav Stetsko described himself as having always been and remaining a 'Dontsovist' (dontsivets).

According to Timothy Snyder, Ukraine rejected Dontsov's theory that it should be exclusively for and about people who spoke Ukrainian and shared Ukrainian culture. His brand of ethnic nationalism lost out in favour of the pluralistic form championed by Vyacheslav Lypynsky and Ivan L. Rudnytsky. Dontsovism was explicitly rejected by the Sixtiers who instead focused on individual rights, the rule of law, and constructing a common front with other Soviet dissidents.

According to Andrew Wilson, Soviet propaganda was successful in convincing many Ukrainians that all Ukrainian nationalists of the 1930s and 1940s had been Dontsovites, feeding into a mythologized tradition that many Ukrainian radicals would later seek to revive in the 1990s. Dontsovite nationalism reemerged in the late 1980s and early 1990s in the Ukrainian far-right, especially in the UNA-UNSO led by Yurii Shukhevych, the Social-National Party of Ukraine, and the politics of Valentyn Moroz. Far-right groups reprinted Dontsov's works and, in 2007, Oleh Bahan [ukr] and Petro Ivanyshyn [ukr] founded the Dmytro Dontsov Scientific-Ideological Centre to advance his ideas.

Petro Poroshenko has quoted The Present Political Position of the Nation and Our Tasks in his speeches.

According to Trevor Erlacher, virtually all 21st century Dontsovists selectively interpret the meaning of Dontsovism to fit various agendas, aided by Dontsov's varying beliefs and allegiances across his life, though the principle of moving away from Russia and towards Europe remains consistent.

=== Commemoration ===
In 2013, a memorial plaque to Dontsov was unveiled at his former residence in Lviv by Svoboda politician Iryna Farion, though it was later destroyed by unknown vandals. Its restoration was funded by Right Sector. In January 2019, another memorial plaque in honour of Dontsov was unveiled on the side of the Ukrinform headquarters in Kyiv.

Several streets in Ukraine are named in honour of Dontsov in Dnipro, Zhytomyr, Ivano-Frankivsk, Lutsk, Lviv, Odesa, Sumy, Kherson, and Kropyvnytskyi— a street in Melitopol bearing his name was renamed in 2022.

== Main works ==
- Modern Russophilism (Moderne moskvofilstvo, 1913)
- The Present Political Position of the Nation and Our Tasks (Suchasne politychne polozhennia natsiï i nashi zavdannia, 1913)
- The Ukrainian State Idea and the War Against Russia (Die ukrainische Staatsidee und der Krieg gegen Russland [in German], 1915)
- The History of the Development of the Idea of a Ukrainian State (Istoriia rozvytku ukraïns'koï derzhavnoï ideï, 1917)
- Ukraine's International Position and Russia (Mizhnarodne polozhennia Ukraïny i Rosiia, 1918)
- Ukrainian Political Thought and Europe (Ukraïnska derzhavna dumka i Evropa, 1919)
- The Culture of Primitivism: The Main Foundations of Russian Culture (Kul'tura prymityvizmu: Holovni pidstavy rosiis'koï kul'tury, 1919)
- The Foundations of Our Politics (Pidstavy nashoï polityky, 1921)
- The Poetess of the Ukrainian Risorgimento: Lesia Ukrainka (Poetka ukraïnskoho risordzhimenta: Lesia Ukraïnka, 1922)
- Nationalism (Natsionalizm, 1926)
- The Politics of Principle and of Opportunism (Polityka pryntsypiial'na i oportunistychna, 1928)
- Spirit of Ukraine: Ukrainian Contribution to the World Culture (1935)
- Our Era and Literature (Nasha doba i literatura, 1936)
- The Intoxicant of Socialism (Durman sotsiializmu, 1936)
- Where to Seek Our Historical Traditions (De shukaty nashykh istorychnykh tradytsii, 1938)
- The Spirit of Our Antiquity (Dukh nashoï davnyny, 1944; 1951 version)
- The Poetess of the Fiery Limits: Olena Teliha (Poetka vohnianykh mezh: Olena Teliha, 1952)
- The Truth of the Great Ancestors (Pravda pradidiv velykykh, 1952)
- Russia or Europe (Rosiia chy Evropa, 1955)
- From Mysticism to Politics (Vid mistyky do polityky, 1957)
- The Spirit of Russia (Der Geist Russlands [in German], 1961)
- The Watchword of the Era (Klych doby, 1968)

[Taken from the Internet Encyclopedia of Ukraine, published by the Canadian Institute of Ukrainian Studies.]

== Bibliography ==
- Bastow, Steve (2006). "Integral Nationalism". In Blamires, Cyprian (ed.). World Fascism: A Historical Encyclopedia. Santa Barbara, CA: ABC-Clio.
- Carynnyk, Marco (2011). "Foes of our rebirth: Ukrainian nationalist discussions about Jews, 1929–1947". Nationalities Papers. 39 (3): 315–352. doi:10.1080/00905992.2011.570327.
- Erlacher, Trevor (2021). Ukrainian Nationalism in the Age of Extremes: An Intellectual Biography of Dmytro Dontsov. Cambridge, MA: Harvard University Press. doi:10.2307/j.ctv2d8qwsn. ISBN 978-067-425-093-2. JSTOR j.ctv2d8qwsn.
- Feldman, Matt (2006). "Heidegger, Martin". In Blamires, Cyprian (ed.). World Fascism: A Historical Encyclopedia. Santa Barbara, CA: ABC-Clio. pp. 302–305.
- Himka, John-Paul (2022). "Reclaiming the Past, Confronting the Past: OUN–UPA Memory Politics and Nation Building in Ukraine (1991–2016)". War and Memory in Russia, Ukraine and Belarus. Palgrave Macmillan Memory Studies. pp. 107–137. doi:10.1007/978-3-319-66523-8_4. ISBN 978-3-319-66523-8.
- Kravtsiv, Bohdan (1974). "Preface". In Sosnovsky, Mykhailo (ed.). Dmytro Dontsov: A Political Portrait (in Ukrainian). New York, Toronto: Shevchenko Scientific Society Library of Ukrainian Studies, Vol. 33.
- Kurylo, Taras; Khymka, Ivan (2011). "How did the OUN treat the Jews? Reflections on the book by Volodymyr Viatrovych" (PDF). Ukraina Moderna (in Ukrainian). 13 (2): 252–265.
- Kurylo, Taras (2014). "The 'Jewish Question' in the Ukrainian Nationalist Discourse of the Inter-War Period". In Petrovsky-Shtern Y., Polonsky A. (ed.). Polin: Studies in Polish Jewry Volume 26: Jews and Ukrainians. Liverpool University Press, Littman Library of Jewish Civilisation. pp. 233–258. doi:10.2307/j.ctv2vr8vjf. ISBN 978-1-906764-19-7. JSTOR j.ctv2vr8vjf.
- Motyl, Alexander J. (1980). The Turn to the Right: The Ideological Origins and Development of Ukrainian Nationalism, 1919-1929. East European quarterly. ISBN 978-091-471-058-5.
- Redlich, Shimon (1998). "Jewish–Ukrainian Relations in Inter-War Poland as Reflected in Some Ukrainian Publications" ( (PDF)). In Polonsky, Antony (ed.). Polin: Studies in Polish Jewry Volume 11: Focusing on Aspects and Experiences of Religion. pp. 232–246. Archived from the original on 12 February 2022.
- Rossoliński-Liebe, Grzegorz (2011). "The "Ukrainian National Revolution" of 1941: Discourse and Practice of a Fascist Movement". Kritika: Explorations in Russian and Eurasian History. 12 (1): 83–114. doi:10.1353/kri.2011.a411661.
- Rudling, Per Anders (2011). "The OUN, the UPA and the Holocaust: A Study in the Manufacturing of Historical Myths". The Carl Beck Papers in Russian and East European Studies. 2107. Pittsburgh: University Center for Russian and East European Studies.
- Rudnytsky, Ivan L. (1987). "Volodymyr Vynnychenko's Ideas in the Light of His Political Writings". Essays in Modern Ukrainian History. Edmonton: Canadian Institute of Ukrainian Studies, University of Alberta. pp. 417–436. ISBN 0-920862-47-0.
- Snyder, Timothy (8 September 2022). The Making of Modern Ukraine. Class 2: The Genesis of Nations (lecture video). Yalecourses (Yale university). Event occurs at 37:39 – via YouTube.
- Wilson, Andrew (1996). Ukrainian Nationalism in the 1990s: A Minority Faith. Cambridge: Cambridge University Press. ISBN 978-052-157-457-0.
- Yaniv, Volodymyr [since updated] (2002). "Dontsov, Dmytro". Internet Encyclopedia of Ukraine. Canadian Institute of Ukrainian Studies, University of Alberta.
- Zaitsev, Oleksandr (2014). "Ukrainskyi intehralnyi natsionalizm (1920-1930-ti roky): heneza, evoliutsiia, porivnialnyi analiz" [Ukrainian integral nationalism (1920s-1930s): Genesis, evolution, comparative analysis] (PDF) (in Ukrainian). PhD diss., National Academy of Sciences of Ukraine. Archived from the original on 14 September 2024.
- Zaitsev, Oleksandr (2015). "Fascism or ustashism? Ukrainian integral nationalism of the 1920s-1930s in comparative perspective". Communist and Post-Communist Studies. 48 (2–3): 183–193.
- Zaitsev, Oleksandr (31 May 2019). "Natsionalist u dobi fashyzmu. Dontsov i vistnykivtsi" [The Nationalist in the Era of Fascism. Dontsov and the Vistnykites.]. Istorychna Pravda (in Ukrainian). Excerpt from Chapter 12 of the book: Natsionalist u dobi fashyzmu: lvivskyi period Dmytra Dontsova, 1922-1939 roky. Nacherk intelektualnoi biohrafii [The Nationalist in the Era of Fascism: The Lviv Period of Dmytro Dontsov, 1922–1939. A Sketch of an Intellectual Biography.] (in Ukrainian)
