= Bergbauernhilfe =

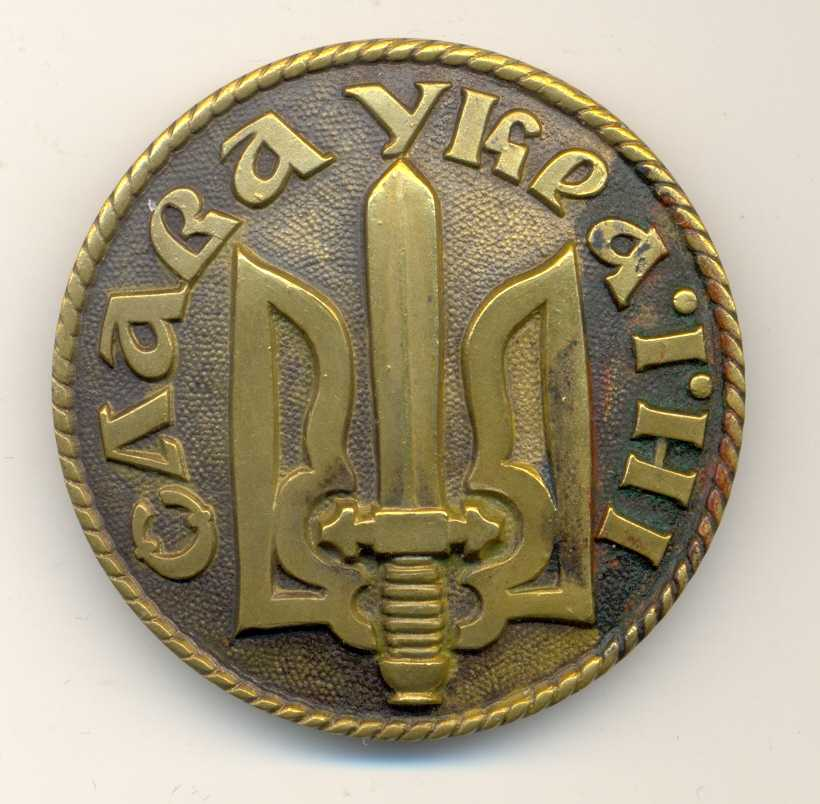
- Active: August 15, 1939
- Disbanded: September 28, 1939
- Role: Never saw action
- Size: 120 men

Commanders
- Colonel of the Regiment: Roman Sushko

Bergbauernhilfe (BBH)– ("mountain-peasant’s help", German: Ukrainische Legion) – codename of the Abwehr II subversive operations unit of 120 men recruited from the OUN members. It was established on August 15, 1939. This unit was disbanded on September 28 of the same year, and Abwehr was ordered to cease contacts with Ukrainian Nationalists with the advent of the Molotov–Ribbentrop Pact.
