= Yevhen Konovalets =

Ukrainian military and political leader (1891–1938)

- Євген Коновалець
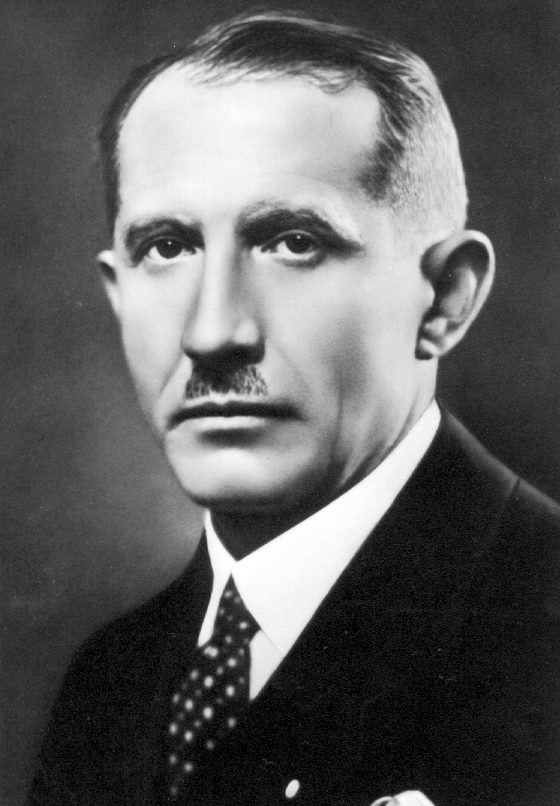
- Konovalets in 1920
- Born: June 14, 1891; Zashkiv, Galicia, Austria-Hungary
- Died: May 23, 1938 (aged 46); Rotterdam, Netherlands
- Military career
- Allegiance: Austria-Hungary; Ukrainian People's Republic
- Branch: Austro-Hungarian Army (Ukrainian People's Republic) Ukrainian People's Army
- Service years: 1914–1915; 1917–1920
- Rank: Colonel; Second lieutenant
- Units: Lemberg District Defense; Sich Riflemen
- Commands: Sich Riflemen
- Conflicts: First World War; Eastern Front; Russian Civil War; Ukrainian War of Independence; Ukrainian–Soviet War; Kiev Arsenal January Uprising; Anti-Hetman Uprising
- Other work: Politician, co-creator of the UVO and OUN

Yevhen Mykhailovych Konovalets (Note: Also anglicised as Eugene Konovalets; Ukrainian: Євген Михайлович Коновалець) (14 June 1891 – 23 May 1938) was a Ukrainian military commander and political leader of the Ukrainian nationalist movement. He is best known for his role in the Ukrainian War of Independence as leader of the Sich Riflemen and as the leader of the Organisation of Ukrainian Nationalists (OUN) from its foundation in 1929 to his assassination in 1938 by the NKVD. Konovalets was also a veteran of the First World War and cofounded the OUN's predecessor, the Ukrainian Military Organisation, in 1920, assuming leadership of the organisation.

== Early life and education ==
Konovalets was born 14 June 1891 in the village of Zashkiv in Austro-Hungarian Galicia; today the village is in Lviv Raion, Lviv Oblast, Ukraine.

Konovalets attended the Lviv Academic Gymnasium from 1901–1909 and subsequently enrolled at the University of Lviv where he studied law. In 1910, he participated in a protest demanding a Ukrainian university in Lviv, during which he was arrested and at least one person was killed.

Konovalets became an active member of the Prosvita society, a Ukrainian cultural-educational association, and a representative on the executive committee of the Ukrainian National-Democratic Party [ukr]. From 1909–1912, he gave lectures and developed the local Prosvita and Sokol societies. During the final years of gymnasium and early student years, Konovalets chose Prosvita because he believed it was the only way to provide mass education in the native Ukrainian language, overcome pro-Moscow influences, and awaken national sentiments among the people.

In 1912, he became secretary of Prosvita's Lviv department, retaining the position though he was later drafted into the Austro-Hungarian Army where he spent a year in officers' training and rose to the rank of second lieutenant. In 1913, he became a leader of the local student movement. He was greatly influenced by the nationalist ideology and rhetoric of the prominent Ukrainian thinkers Ivan Bobersky, Myroslav Sichynsky [ukr], and Dmytro Dontsov, having become acquainted with the latter two at the Second All-Ukrainian Student Congress that year.

== First World War (1914-1917) ==
With the outbreak of the First World War, Konovalets was mobilised in the summer of 1914, serving in the 19th Regiment of the Lviv Regional Defense. In June 1915, he was taken prisoner of war by the Russians during the battles near the mountain Makivka and interned in a prisoner-of-war camp in Chornyi Yar, located between Tsaritsyn and Astrakhan, from late 1916.

As a result of the 1917 February Revolution and the abdication of Tsar Nicholas II, the Central Rada was established in Ukraine, thus starting the Ukrainian War of Independence, though it was initially reluctant to form a regular army and, out of fear of being accused of Austrophilism, refused to accept former Austrian soldiers from Galicia into Ukrainian ranks.

In the internment camp, Konovalets founded the 'Tsaritsyn Ukrainian Council' that organised social work, preparing reports and essays on current socio-political topics and even organising a theatre group. Together with Andriy Melnyk in the Dubovka camp, Konovalets organised a Ukrainised kurin with a staff of around a 1,000 people within the Tsaritsyn camp. With a group of his fellow prisoners-of-war, Konovalets escaped and arrived in Kyiv in July, remaining there from September.

== Ukrainian War of Independence (1917-1920) ==
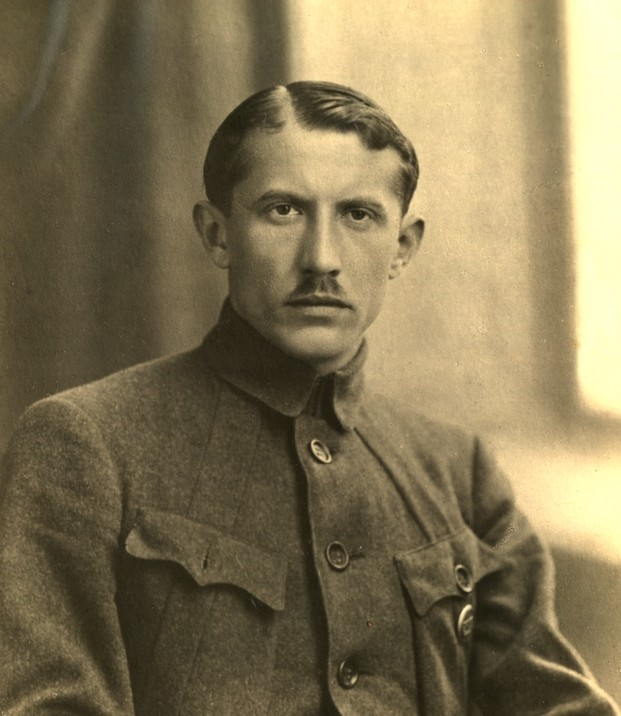
Konovalets in Kyiv, 1918.

Konovalets established ties with the Galician-Bukovinian Committee (Note: The main functions of the Galician-Bukovinian Committee were to provide assistance to Ukrainian refugees, deportees, and prisoners-of-war from Austria-Hungary.) and advocated for the creation of a West Ukrainian military unit. From September Konovalets worked with the Galician-Bukovinian Committee to organise the Galician-Bukovinian Kurin of the Sich Riflemen [ukr], which was officially sanctioned on 12 November. (Note: The unit was renamed the 1st Kurin of the Sich Riflemen in January 1918 to better align with its principle of Ukrainian unity and later the 1st Sich Riflemen Regiment on 26 March following an order from the government.) He sent word to the prisoners-of-war in the Dubovka camp and assumed command of the unit in late 1917, formally presenting as such at a meeting on 8 January 1918 where the unit was reformed and centralised. Amid a lack of coordination among nationalist forces, Konovalets and Melnyk developed an operation plan to quell the Kyiv Arsenal January Uprising in which the Sich Riflemen distinguished themselves and played a key role in liberating the city. Konovalets held the position of otaman in the Ukrainian People's Army (UNA) and in recognition of his contribution was conferred the rank of colonel as of March. Kyiv was captured by the Bolsheviks in February before being recaptured in March following a UPR and Central Powers counteroffensive per the Bread Peace. Konovalets's Sich Riflemen aided the German recapture of the city and policed the streets of Kyiv, though the German military authorities dissolved the Central Rada in April and installed the Ukrainian State in its place.

Following minor skirmishes in Kyiv between Riflemen and Hetman forces on 29 April, Konovalets, accompanied by Melnyk, met with Hetman Pavlo Skoropadskyi and subsequently held negotiations with the German military authorities. Having been delivered an ultimatum to unconditionally recognise Skoropadskyi's government or disarm, Konovalets and the Riflemen agreed to disarm on 1 May. Konovalets was elected Chairman of the Main Council of Galician, Bukovinian, and Hungarian Ukrainians that organised the West Ukrainian community in Kyiv and began lobbying Skoropadskyi for the restoration of the Sich Riflemen formation. He reached out to and held several meetings with Dmytro Dontsov in July to help him secure a meeting with the Hetman which eventually took place on 29 July. Skoropadsky agreed to restore the Sich Rifleman on the basis that it swore loyalty to the Ukrainian State, proclaiming the new unit by decree on 23 August with Konovalets as its commander and its base in Bila Tserkva. In November 1918, Konovalets officially requested a void of the proposed federal union with White Russia from the Hetmanate. When Skoropadskyi refused, he met with Volodymyr Vynnychenko and decided to support the forces of Symon Petliura and the Directorate of the UPR in the Anti-Hetman Uprising. Konovalets was appointed Commander of the Front, with Skoropadskyi successfully ousted in December.

According to Peter Kenez, "On December 14, after the Directorate arrived at an agreement with the Germans, who were anxious to complete their evacuation and therefore promised neutrality, the Army of the Directorate under General Konovalets entered the Ukrainian capital and met only sporadic resistance. Fifteen hundred Russian officers were sequestered in the Pedagogical Museum; their weapons were taken away and they were regarded as prisoners of war."

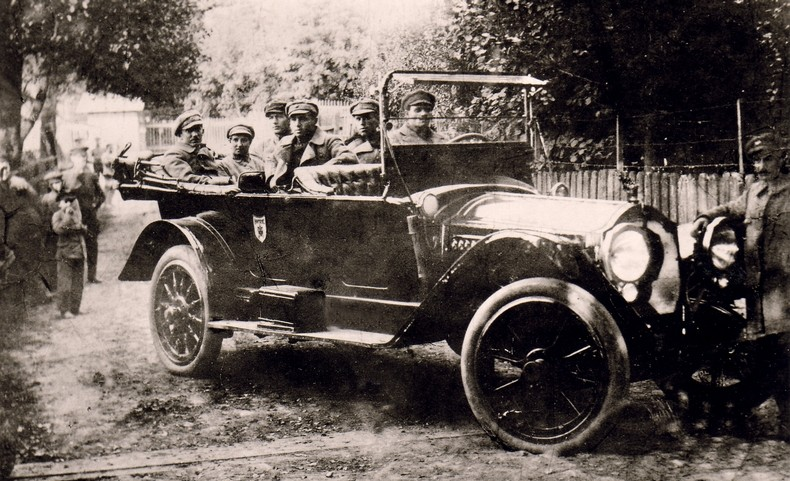
Konovalets (first left) as commander of Sich Riflemen in Shepetivka, 1919

In January 1919, at a conference in Kyiv consisting of pro-independence parties, the Riflemen delegation put forward a proposal to reform the government into a temporary triumvirate military dictatorship consisting of Petliura, Konovalets, and Melnyk in order to better meet the demands of the state-building process though this was rejected by the other parties present, including Petliura and the Directorate. The dissolution of the Austro-Hungarian Empire the preceding November had seen the Polish-Ukrainian War break out for control of Western Ukraine, with Konovalets becoming Commander of the Eastern Front from 23 January 1919. Kyiv was captured by the Bolsheviks in February and that autumn the Ukrainian People's Army (UNA) found itself caught in a 'death triangle' between the Bolsheviks, the Whites, and the Poles, with no supply lines to the anti-Bolshevik Entente powers. In early December, and as a result of a meeting of UPR military leaders, Konovalets demobilised his military formations with UNA soldiers given the choice of departing south or participating in the guerilla-fought First Winter Campaign. Later that month he was taken prisoner and interned in a Polish prisoner-of-war camp in Lutsk. Konovalets was released in the spring of 1920 due to the Polish-Ukrainian alliance and travelled to Vienna, hoping to set up a military unit to aid the Kyiv offensive though this was hampered by tensions with members of the Ukrainian Galician Army who were aggrieved at the Treaty of Warsaw that had ceded most of Western Ukraine to Poland in return for Polish recognition of Petliura's UPR. With the subsequent collapse of the Polish-Ukrainian lines he moved to Czechoslovakia.

== Leader of the UVO and exile (1920-1929) ==
Recognising that the battle for independence was lost, Konovalets together with former members of the Sich Riflemen and the Ukrainian Galician Army set up a new organisation capable of clandestine activities on the lands claimed by Ukrainians and controlled by Poland, the Russian and Ukrainian SSR's, Romania, and Czechoslovakia. Created in August 1920 in Prague, the Ukrainian Military Organisation (UVO) was aimed at armed resistance against Poland and Russia and was involved in the military training of youth and the prevention of any form of cooperation between Ukrainian and Polish authorities, often resorting to terrorist attacks against Polish politicians as well as members of the Ukrainian intelligentsia. The name of the organisation was inspired by Józef Piłsudski's Polish Military Organisation, which had operated during the First World War. After the end of the Battle of Lviv and the wider Polish–Soviet War with the Peace of Riga, Konovalets became the leader of the UVO, based in the city.

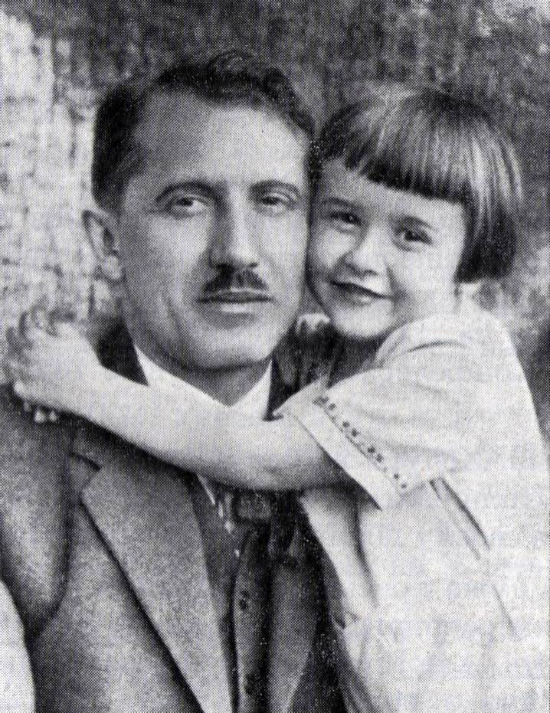
Yevhen Konovalets with son Yurko

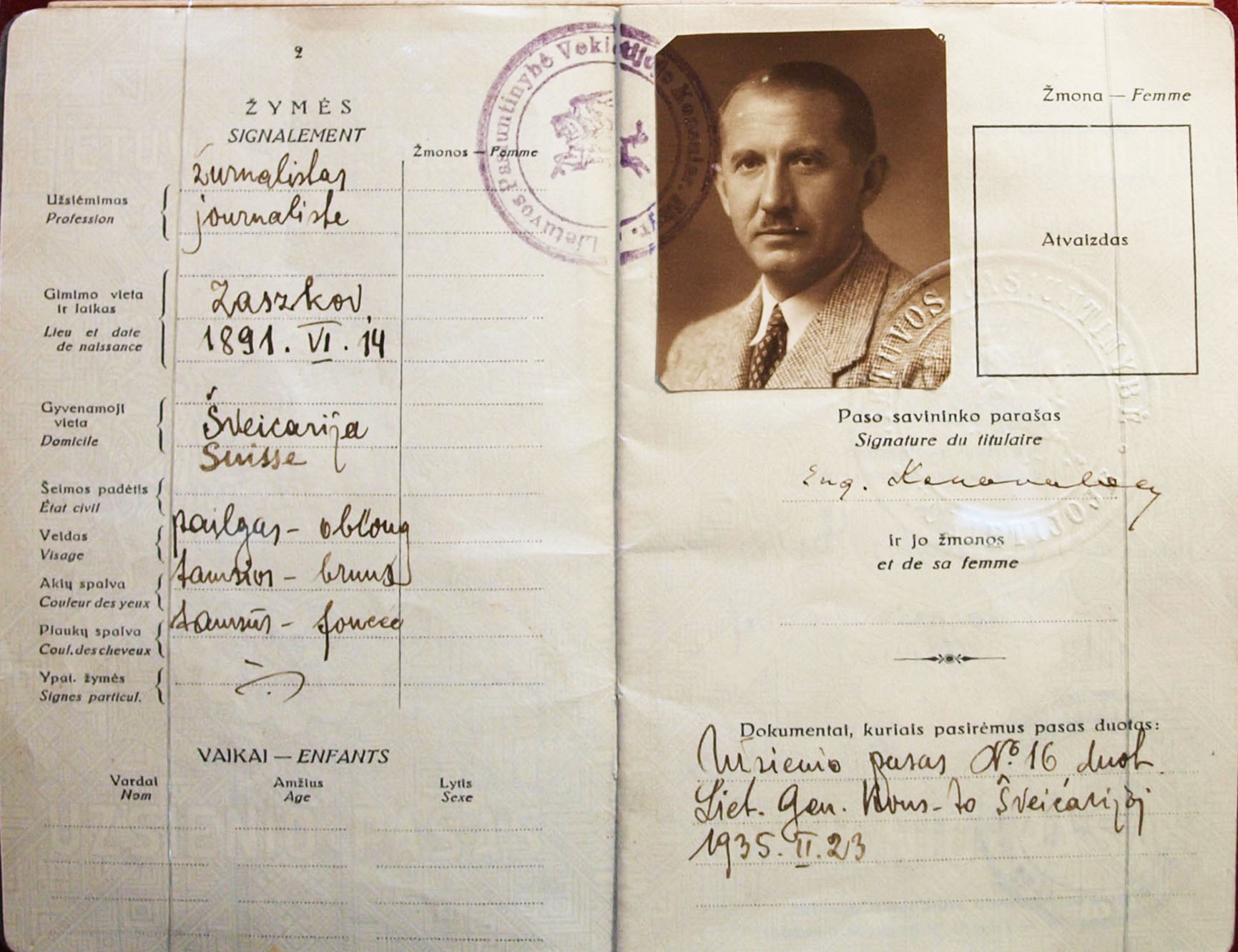
Yevhen Konovalets' Lithuanian passport, used in exile

Konovalets married Olha Fedak in February 1922, daughter of Stepan Fedak, a lawyer and one of the wealthiest men in Galicia, and whose brother had attempted to assassinate Chief of State Marshal Piłsudski in 1921. Konovalets was forced to flee the country in December that year following the UVO's assassination of Sydir Tverdokhlib. During his exile years he went on to live in Czechoslovakia, Germany, Switzerland, and Italy. Due to the family's constant forced relocations, their son Yurko, born January 1924, had to learn different languages for his schooling – German, French, Italian – but at home his mother insisted on their speaking their native Ukrainian.

Konovalets based himself in Berlin in 1924, settling the UVO Executive Command there in 1926, from where he developed a network that spread across Western Ukraine as well as an operational command for affiliates across Europe. The UVO received some degree of support from political rivals of Poland, including Lithuania, Latvia, and Czechoslovakia, though Weimar Germany played an outsized role, providing military training for hundreds of UVO members in East Prussia between 1924 and 1928 and transporting money, arms, and ammunition through the Free City of Danzig. Waves of arrests of UVO members in Galicia for pro-German espionage from 1924 onwards, starting with the Olha Basarab case, stoked disenchantment with Konovalets's policies with a brief leadership coup of the UVO Home Command resolved by a Berlin tribunal presided over by Konovalets in September 1928.

In late 1928, the new minister of the Reichswehr halted financial support of the UVO, partly due to the influence of Skoropadskyi, exiled in Berlin, who disagreed with the organisation's methods and hoped to popularise the Hetman movement but principally driven by the 1927 withdrawal of the Military Inter-Allied Commission of Control that allowed Weimar Germany the space to carry out its own intelligence activities. Konovalets thus moved his centre of operations to Geneva, settling the entire leadership there by early 1929.

== Leader of the OUN (1929-1938) ==
In February 1929, Konovalets took part in the First Congress of Ukrainian Nationalists in Vienna, which elected to consolidate the UVO with several far-right nationalist student organisations into the Organisation of Ukrainian Nationalists (OUN), with Konovalets as its leader. He promoted its influence among Ukrainian émigrés throughout Europe and America, further developing five foreign organisations operating in the Baltics (in Lithuania), Western (spread across Belgium, Luxembourg, France, Italy, and Switzerland) and Central (spread across Germany, Czechoslovakia, and Austria) Europe, the Balkans (in Yugoslavia and Bulgaria), and North America (in the USA and Canada).

Konovalets engaged in an international diplomatic lobbying effort that sought to draw attention to the treatment of Ukrainians in Galicia and Volhynia in the context of Polish policies of Polonisation and pacification, which were in turn partly driven by UVO terrorism in what formed a vicious cycle. Konovalets was invited to the XIth Assembly of the League of Nations in 1930 by the Lithuanian foreign minister where the treatment of minorities in Poland was discussed and the Ukrainian issue highlighted by the German representative (concerned about ethnic Germans in Silesia) as well as by a petition from the UK parliament. However, Konovalets's efforts to win a diplomatic victory over the Polish government came to little as the Ukrainian issue was passed on to the Committee of Three who in turn issued a communique stressing the importance of understanding between Poles and Ukrainians, with the issue largely losing momentum after the 1931 assassination of Tadeusz Hołówko and media reports of the OUN receiving support from Weimar Germany.

In June 1933, Konovalets met with German officials at a conference in Berlin and, though he was wary of the Nazi Party's attitude towards Slavic peoples, they found common ground in their dissatisfaction with the Versailles order and was later discouraged by the German-Polish non-aggression pact. Konovalets represented the OUN at the IXth International Congress of National Minorities in September, held in Bern, where members sought to draw attention to the Holodomor and organise aid to the Ukrainian SSR.

Konovalets is widely credited as having largely successfully managed the generational divide within the OUN that would later cause the organisation to split into two factions.^{:36} In response to objections within the organisation to Mykola Stsiborskyi's dynamic marital past and his relationship with a Jewish woman in 1934, Konovalets wrote:

"If nationalism is waging war against mixed marriages insofar as conquerors (especially Poles and Russians) are concerned, then it cannot bypass the problem of mixed marriages with Jews, who are indisputably if not greater, then at least comparable, foes of our rebirth."^{:325-6}

Konovalets did however side with Stsiborskyi when he complained about the particularly extreme antisemitic writings of theorist Oleksander Mytsiuk being published in the OUN's ideological journal Rozbudova natsiï, reprimanding the editor Volodymyr Martynets.^{:321}

As a result of the assassination of Polish Interior Minister Bronisław Pieracki carried out by regional leadership in June 1934, the OUN alienated many of its international partners and diplomatic contacts with Konovalets forbidden to settle in Geneva and ordered to leave Switzerland in mid-1936, settling instead in Rome. In August 1937, Konovalets met with Japanese diplomats in Vienna to discuss the creation of Ukrainian military units that would be deployed to the Far East in the event of war with the USSR, though the cooperation agreement never materialised.

== Assassination ==
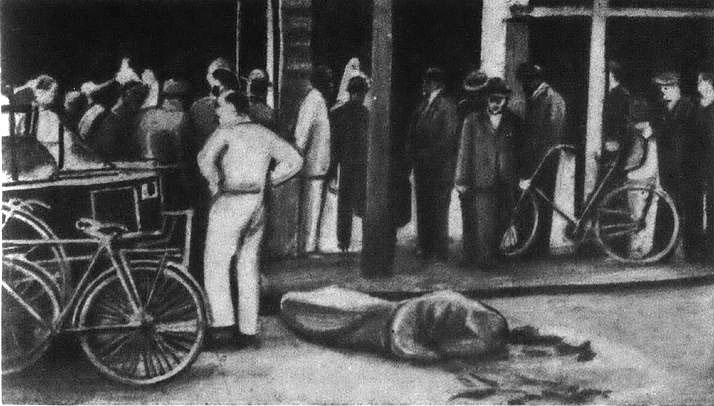
The body of Konovalets, at the site of the explosion.

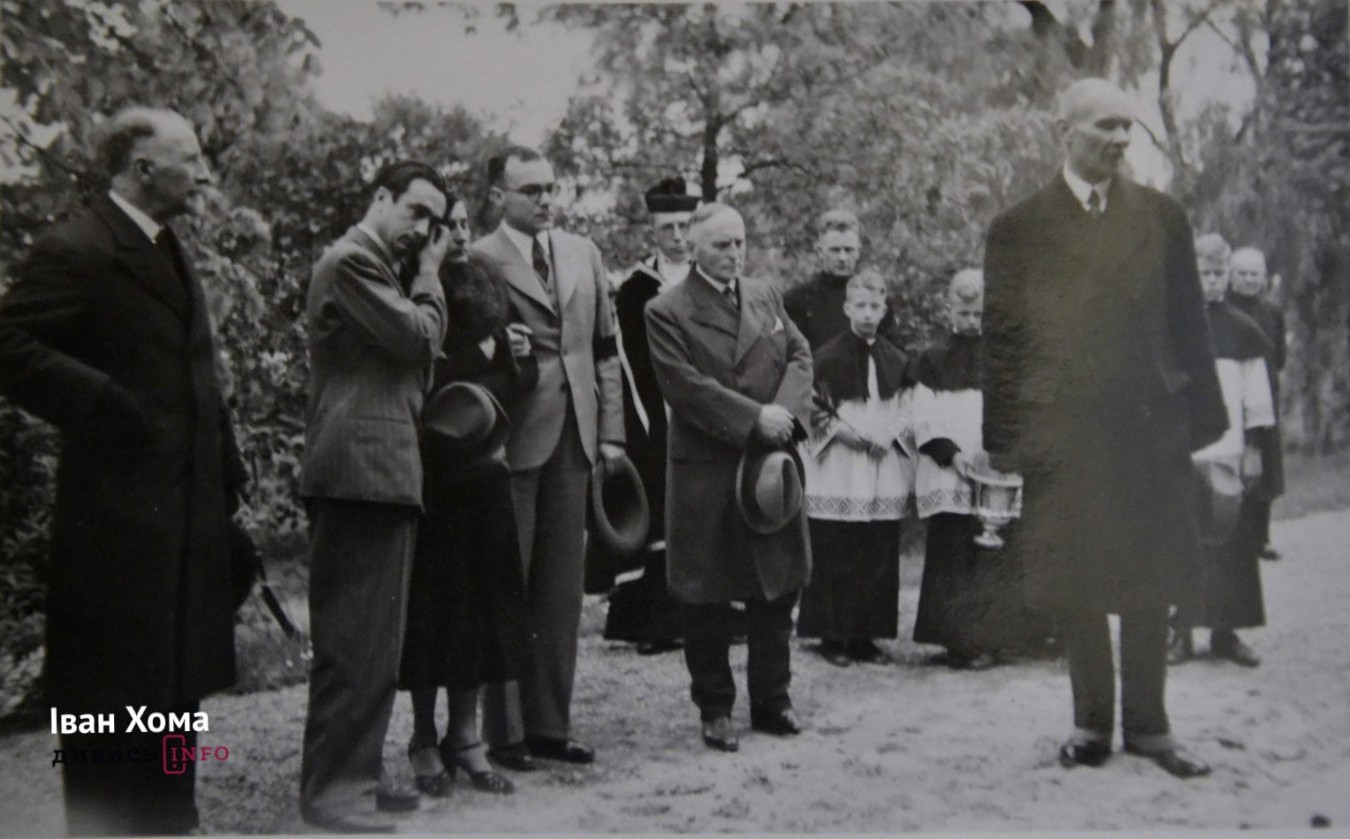
OUN members and others at Konovalets's funeral, 28 May 1938. Historian Ivan Khoma identifies (L-R) Consul General of Lithuania in Rotterdam Pierre Penn, Yaroslav Baranovksy, Olha Konovalets, Volodymyr Martynets, Omelyan Tarnavetsky, and Viktor Kurmanovych (front).

Konovalets' activities raised Kremlin fears of the OUN's penetration into the Soviet Union. On 23 May 1938, he was assassinated in Rotterdam with a bomb concealed in a box of chocolates disguised as a present from a close friend. The friend had actually been an NKVD agent who had infiltrated the Organisation of Ukrainian Nationalist: Pavel Sudoplatov, who on a recent visit to the Soviet Union had been personally ordered by Joseph Stalin to assassinate Konovalets in retaliation for the 1933 assassination of a diplomat at the Soviet consulate in Lviv.

Sudoplatov, after a period of training, had slipped into Finland in July 1935, using the alias "Pavel Gridgdenko" and serving as an OUN contact in the USSR. According to Sudoplatov, Stalin had told him: "This is not just an act of revenge, although Konovalets is an agent of German fascism. Our goal is to behead the movement of Ukrainian fascism on the eve of war and force these gangsters to annihilate each other in a struggle for power."

Due to his sudden disappearance, the OUN immediately suspected Sudoplatov of Konovalets' murder. Therefore, a photograph of Sudoplatov and Konovalets together was distributed to every OUN unit. Sudoplatov wrote: "In the 1940s, SMERSH... captured two guerrilla fighters in Western Ukraine, one of whom had this photo of me on him. When asked why he was carrying it, he replied, 'I have no idea why, but the order is if we find this man to liquidate him'."

On 28 May 1938 Konovalets was buried at the Crooswijk General Cemetery in Rotterdam. The tombstone on his grave was designed in 1939 by Oksana Liaturynska and Robert Lisovskyi.

== Commemoration ==
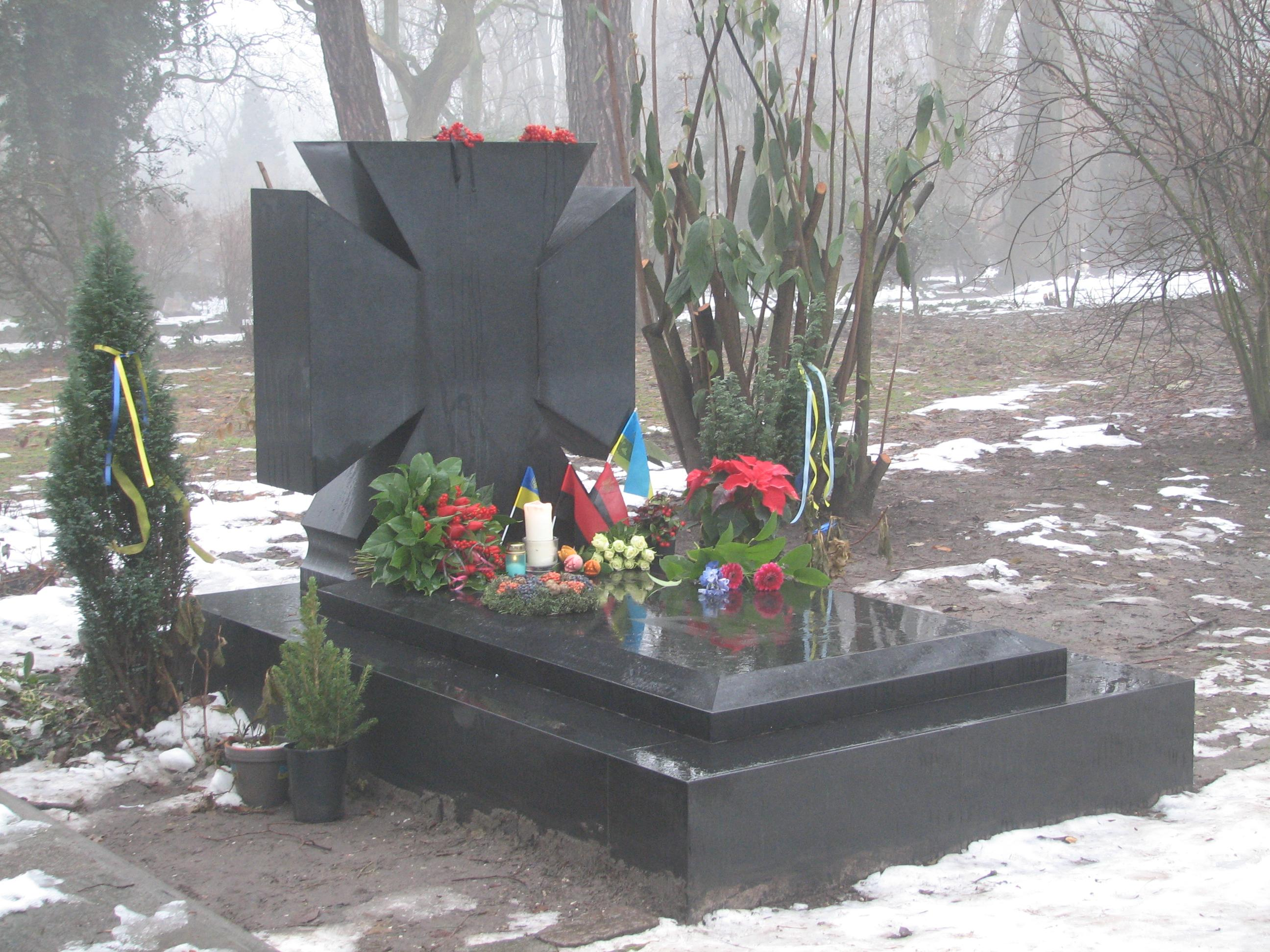
Tomb of Yevhen Konovalets in Rotterdam, the Netherlands

In 2006, the Lviv city administration announced the future transference of the remains of Yevhen Konovalets, Stepan Bandera, Andriy Melnyk and other key leaders of OUN and UPA to a new area of Lychakiv Cemetery specifically dedicated to heroes of the Ukrainian liberation movement.

On June 17, 2011, in Vilnius, Lithuania the conference "Yevhen Konovalets: Lithuanian citizen - the Ukrainian patriot. Celebration of 120th birthday" was organised by the Lithuanian Parliamentary Foreign Affairs Committee, People's Liberation Movement Research Centre (Ukraine) and Ukrainian organisations in Lithuania.

On 1 October 2023, Ukrainian president Volodymyr Zelenskyy handed a ribbon of honorary to the 131st Separate Reconnaissance Battalion of the Ground Forces to be named in honour of Konovalets.

In 2026, Konovalets' remains were exhumed in Rotterdam as part of preparations for repatriation to Ukraine and reburial at the National Military Memorial Cemetery. On 13 August, his remains were brought to Kyiv, Ukraine, where they were received with full state and military honours. His gravestone at the Crooswijk General Cemetery was also sent to Ukraine, where it was kept at Konovalets' museum-estate in his native Zashkiv.

On 14 August 2026, Konovalets' remains were brought to the Patriarchal Cathedral of the Resurrection of Christ of the Ukrainian Greek Catholic Church in Kyiv. A panakhida (farewell ceremony) was held at the cathedral, where the public could pay their respects. On 18 August 2026, Konovalets's remains were temporarily reburied at the National Military Memorial Cemetery. They are expected to be later transferred to the Ukrainian Military Pantheon.

== Bibliography ==
- Khoma, Ivan (2011). Sichovi Striltsi. Stvorennia, viiskovo-politychna diialnist ta zbroina borotba Sichovykh Striltsiv u 1917-1919rr [Sich Riflemen. Creation, Military-Political Activities and Armed Struggle of the Sich Riflemen in 1917-1919] (in Ukrainian). Kyiv: Nash chas. Archived from the original on 2019-12-25.
- Khoma, Ivan (2020). "Yevhen Konovalets i Ukrainska Striletska Bryhada v nimetskomu Yablonnomu" [Yevhen Konovalets and the Ukrainian rifle brigade in German Jablonné] (PDF). Scientific Notebooks of the Faculty of History, Lviv University (in Ukrainian) (21): 257–268.
- Volodymyr Kubijovyč, Encyclopedia of Ukraine, Toronto: University of Toronto Press 1984 - 2001.
- encyclopediaofukraine.com
- Dovidnyk z istorii Ukrainy, Kyiv: Heneza 2002.
- Vladislav Moulis, Běsové ruské revoluce, Praha: Dokořán, 2002.
- Foreign Affairs
