= Ukrainian Military Organization =

Ukrainian paramilitary organization

- Українська Військова Організація
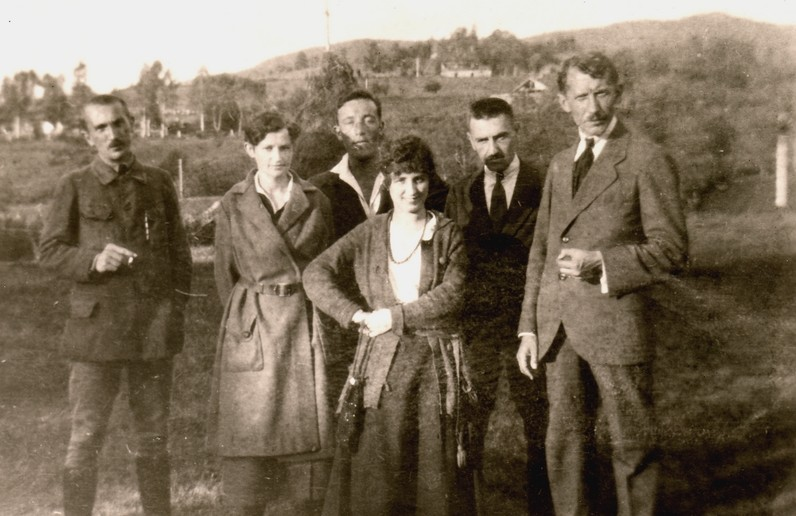
- Leader of the organisation Yevhen Konovalets (first from right) with friends in 1921.
- Leader: Yevhen Konovalets
- Founded: 3 August 1920
- Dissolved: 1929
- Headquarters: Prague
- Ideology: Ukrainian nationalism Ukrainian irredentism Anti-communism; Antisemitism; Anti-Russian sentiment Anti-Polish sentiment
- Size: 1,500–2,000 (1922)

The Ukrainian Military Organization (Ukrainian: Українська Військова Організація abbr. УВО, romanized: Ukrainska Viiskova Orhanizatsiia, UVO), was a Ukrainian paramilitary body, engaged in terrorism (especially in Poland) during the interwar period.

It was formed after the occupation of Ukraine by Soviet Russia following the Ukrainian–Soviet War of 1917–1921 and the Peace of Riga of March 1921 that divided the Ukrainian lands between Poland and the Soviet Union.

Initially headed by Yevhen Konovalets, the organization promoted the idea of armed struggle for the independence of Ukraine. The headquarters of the organization was located in Lwów (today Lviv) in the Second Polish Republic.

== History ==
Created by former members of the Sich Riflemen and the Ukrainian Galician Army (particularly, the 6th Rava Brigade) in August 1920 in Prague, the UVO was a secret military and political movement. Initially operating in all countries with Ukrainian minorities (that is Poland, Czechoslovakia, Bolshevik Russia and Romania), with time it concentrated on actions in Poland only. It was also active among the Ukrainian diaspora abroad, most notably in Germany, Lithuania, Austria and the Free City of Danzig.

Apart from the military education of the Ukrainian youth, the UVO tried to prevent cooperation between Ukrainian and Polish authorities. The UVO was involved in a bitter struggle with the Poles during the 1920s. The group was treated harshly and retaliated with violence. It was, however, envisioned as a military protective group. The organization aimed to overcome the perceived passivity of the Ukrainian society and to keep Ukrainian masses in a state of constant "revolutionary struggle" in preparation for "the final reckoning with the enemy". An UVO brochure from 1929 stated: "Terror will be not only a means of self-defense, but also a form of agitation, which will affect friend and foe alike, regardless of whether they desire it or not."

The UVO organized a number of assassination attempts on some of the most renowned Polish and Ukrainian politicians, some of which were successful. Among such attempts were a failed assault on Chief of State Józef Piłsudski and Voivod of Lwów Kazimierz Grabowski on September 25, 1921, the successful murder of Ukrainian poet Sydir Tverdokhlib and assassinations of Ukrainian activists Wasyl Pihulak and Iwan Bachmaszczuk in 1922, as well as a failed attack on Poland's president Stanisław Wojciechowski in 1924 and the Nonpartisan Bloc for Cooperation with the Government (BBWR) deputy chairman Tadeusz Hołówko. It organized three bomb attacks on the Eastern Trade Fair in Lwów in 1929, bombings of train stations, railway tracks, pumping stations, burnt and blown up police buildings (e.g. in Yavoriv, Gródek, Uhnów, Lubaczów) and Polish households; it was also active in destruction of telegraph, telephone poles and committed a number of expropriation attacks - amongst them - the robbery of 100,000 złoty (then the equivalent of 20,000 dollars) from a Lwów Post Office in 1925. The terrorist actions of the UVO became one of the reasons for creation of the Polish Border Defence Corps.

In May 1923, Yevhen Konovalets and Friedrich Gempp - the chief of the Reichswehrministerium Abwehr-Abteilung signed an agreement according to which the UVO would conduct espionage work against Poland (providing Berlin with political, military and economic information), while the German side was to provide financial aid and military equipment for "revolutionary activity". By 1927, the Ukrainian Military Organization acquired 9,000 Reichsmark from the German intelligence service. The Germans supported military training of Ukrainian Nationalists in Eastern Prussia, whereas the Free City Danzig (Gdańsk) became an important transit place for money, arms and ammunition.

Originally under the nominal authority of the exiled government of the Western Ukrainian People's Republic, in 1925, following a power struggle all the supporters of the Western Ukrainian People's Republic's exiled president Yevhen Petrushevych were expelled.

Although formally UVO existed until World War II, between 1929 and 1934 it became part of the newly formed Organization of Ukrainian Nationalists. Apart from Yevhen Konovalets, notable leaders of the UVO included Andrii Melnyk and Y. Indyshevskyi.

== 2019 official veteran status ==
In late March 2019, former members of armed units of the Organization of Ukrainian Nationalists (and other living former members of irregular Ukrainian nationalist armed groups that were active during World War II and the first decade after the war) were officially granted the status of veterans. This meant that for the first time they could receive veteran benefits, including free public transport, subsidized medical services, annual monetary aid, and public utilities discounts (and will enjoy the same social benefits as former Ukrainian soldiers Red Army of the Soviet Union).

There had been several previous attempts to provide former Ukrainian nationalist fighters with official veteran status, especially under President Viktor Yushchenko, but all failed.

== Leaders ==
- 1920 – 1929 Yevhen Konovalets
  - 1920 – 1922 Yuriy Otmarshtein [ukr], and Dmytro Dontsov (Chief of Staff)
