= Fedak =

Fedak is a surname. Notable people with the surname include:

- Jolanta Fedak (1960–2020), Polish politician
- Sofia Fedak-Melnyk (1901–1990), Ukrainian economist and wife of Andriy Melnyk
- Stepan Fedak (1901–1945), Ukrainian activist and failed assassin
- Yuliana Fedak (born 1983), Ukrainian tennis player

== See also ==
- Sári Fedák (1879–1955), Hungarian actress and singer
