= National Military Memorial Cemetery =

National cemetery in Ukraine

National Military Memorial Cemetery Національне військове меморіальне кладовище
- Interactive map of National Military Memorial Cemetery; Національне військове меморіальне кладовище

Details
- Location: Hatne, Fastiv Raion, Kyiv Oblast
- Country: Ukraine
- Coordinates: 50°17′26.1″N 30°22′06.4″E
- Type: National
- Owned by: Ministry of Veterans Affairs
- Size: 259 hectares (640 acres)
- Website: nmmc.gov.ua

The National Military Memorial Cemetery (Ukrainian: Національне військове меморіальне кладовище) is a national cemetery of Ukraine, located in Markhalivka, Fastiv Raion, Kyiv Oblast, on Highway M05 southwest of Kyiv.

The NMMC was established on 4 October 2022 under the control of the state enterprise "National Military Memorial Cemetery" under the Ministry of Veterans Affairs. Burials began in May 2025, but the complex will not be completed for several more years.

In May 2026, the cemetery attracted international attention, due to the controversial reinternment of the 20th century Ukrainian nationalist figure Andriy Melnyk.

== History ==
=== Background ===
The proposal for the creation of a national cemetery for Ukraine was first put forward by the Party of Regions deputy Vadim Kolesnichenko in 2011, citing the lack of organised burials for state figures and military personnel, with particular mention to the poor state of graves and cemeteries for combatants of the Great Patriotic War. A draft bill was created in order to "perpetuate the memory of fallen liberators and soldiers of the Great Patriotic War of 1941-1945 (Note: According to official terminology at the time of the bill), the War in Afghanistan and other military conflicts, as well as officials in the performance of official duties to the people of Ukraine". However, this bill was never implemented.

With the deteriorating situation in Eastern Ukraine in 2014, an increasing number of Ukrainian combat fatalities once again highlighted the need for new grave space. This was originally envisioned to take place from 2015-2018, but saw little progress. In July 2021, the Law on Military Burial Rituals was passed, stating that the goal of the creation of a national cemetery is to "honour the fallen defenders of the state with dignity, providing them military honours in a way that everyone understands."

In 2022, following the escalation of the Russo-Ukrainian conflict, the Verkhovna Rada approved a law to establish the National Military Memorial Cemetery. Key details of the initiative were revealed:

- The site will feature a military cemetery, museum complex, chapel and associated services.
- The cemetery will serve as a burial site for those who died in defence of the independence of Ukraine.
- All costs will be funded from the state budget, with the standardisation of burial ceremonies and the design of gravestones.
- The burial of high ranking Soviet officials, as well as individuals with criminal records would be excluded.

Funeral rituals would based on the practices of the Ukrainian People's Republic, in a move away from Soviet style traditions.

=== Land disputes ===
Initially the Prime Minister of Ukraine Denis Shmyhal requested that the Kyiv City Council allocated land on the location of Lysa Gora, a historic hilltop and former site of a bastion fort built by the Imperial Russian Army. However, the decision sparked significant protests from the public, stating that the site was unsuitable for a large cemetery, that the area possessed a "negative energy" and that the terrain was unsuitable and contaminated by its previous use as a military facility with possible unexploded ordnance. In addition, the area is a traditional gathering place for neo-pagans. Other sites that were considered included the Holosiivskyi National Nature Park and spare land near the Berkovets cemetery.

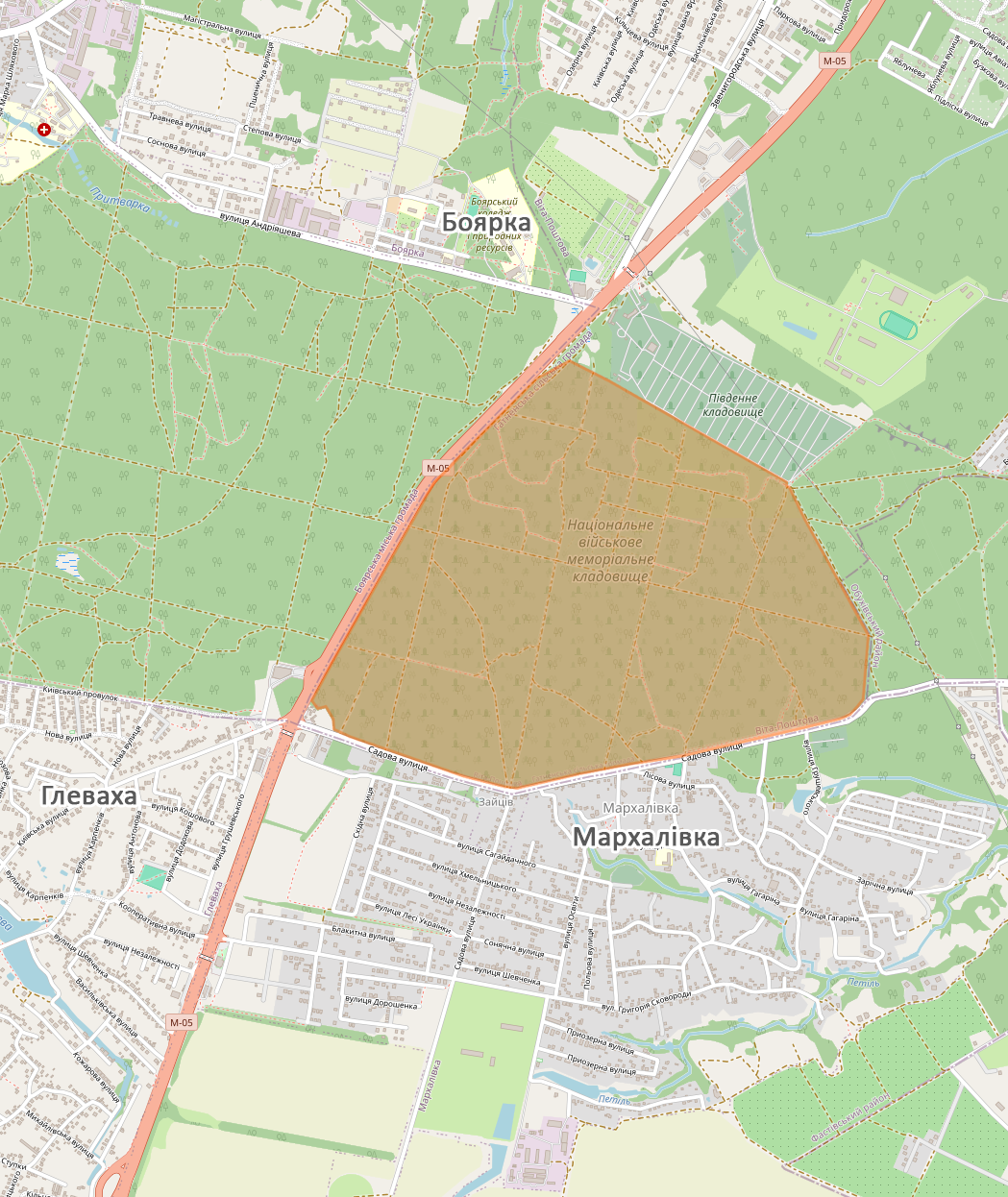
Chosen site in Hatne, Fastiv Raion, Kyiv Oblast.

On 23 March 2023, government officials presented a plan to locate the cemetery in the vicinity of the Bykivnia graves. On 20 April 2023, the land was allocated, with the total area of the site expected to be close to 100 hectares. However, on 19 August 2023, the location was once again changed to a site in Fastiv Raion, citing the complicated archeological conditions of the Bykivnia site which would significantly restrict the cemetery size. The decision was not supported by all, with a protest taking place on Maidan Square on 26 September 2023, with the participation of family members who were waiting for dignified burials for their family members. It was noted that the Verkhovna Rada had cleared the Bykivnia plan, but was being stalled in its implementation by the President of Ukraine.

=== Design and construction ===
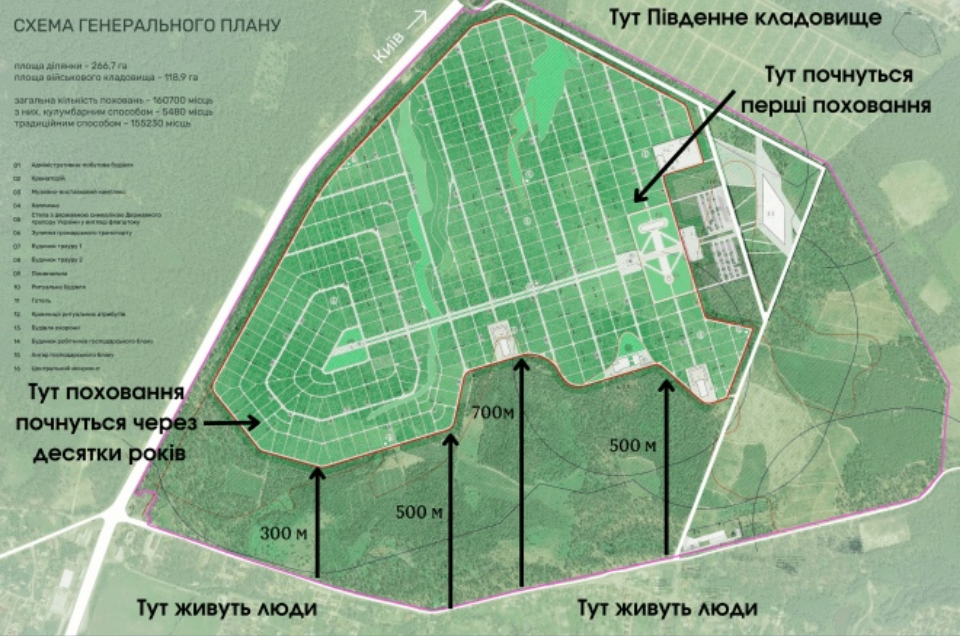
General layout

On 7 December 2023, the Ministry of Veterans Affairs revealed a draft design of the cemetery, developed by Serhiy Derbin. The design incorporates international styles, in particular the Arlington National Cemetery of the United States. The 260 hectare site would contain a memorial square, chapel, crematorium and museum. Construction would occur in a phased manner, with gravestones designed in a single consistent style. On 8 December, the bill for the site located in Hatne was passed.

On 23 February 2024, the Cabinet of Ministers approved funding for the NMMC, with 515 million UAH allocated for 2024. Later in March, the government confirmed the location of the cemetery would be in Hatne, Fastiv Raion, Kyiv Oblast, near the existing Southern cemetery. In April, a protest occurred in the nearby settlement of Markhalivka against the construction of the cemetery, citing groundwater pollution and deforestation. These worries were ignored, despite concerns raised by the Berne Convention on the Conservation of European Wildlife and Natural Habitats.

Preparatory work began in May 2024, with a tender for the first stage of construction released two months later.

On 29 January 2026, the Supreme Court of Ukraine ruled that the redesignation of land and transfer had occurred illegally, stating that the protected conservation status of the area had not been taken into account.

On 30 April 2026, the Verkhovna Rada cancelled the restriction on the burial of soldiers with outstanding criminal convictions.

== Grave markers, niches, and headstones ==
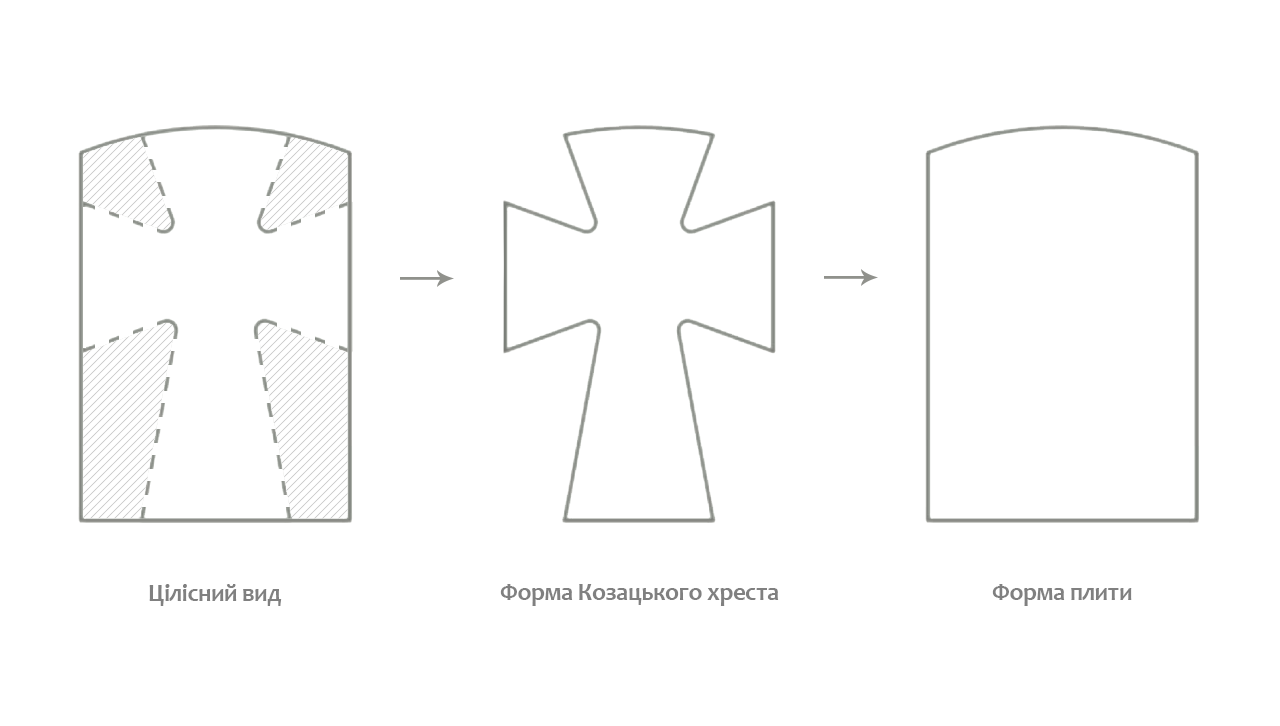
Gravestones

The National Military Memory Cemetery provides two forms of headstones, in the form of a Cossack cross or grave slab.

== Burial procedures ==
=== Burial criteria ===
The following may be buried:

1. Individuals of the state security apparatus and police services.
2. Military personnel who have been awarded the Order of the Gold Star, Order of Bohdan Khmelnytskyi or Order of Courage.
3. Ukrainian combatants.
4. Ukrainian persons with disabilities as a result of war.

The following cannot be buried:

- Individuals who, on the day of their death had an outstanding criminal record, if this record has not ben revoked.
- Individuals who occupied managerial positions in the Communist Party of the Soviet Union, administrative positions of the Soviet Union, Ukrainian SSR or other Soviet Republics, or employees of the Soviet state security apparatus at all levels.

==== Reinternment ====
Those who are buried in other cemeteries, even if otherwise applicable, are not permitted for burial. An exception is made for 20th century nationalist fighters for the independence of Ukraine.

== Notable burials ==
=== Andriy Melnyk ===
On 19 May 2026, President Volodymyr Zelenskyy announced plans to transfer the remains of the 20th century nationalist figure Andriy Melnyk and his wife Sofia to Ukraine. Zelenskyy described them as "iconic Ukrainians of the twentieth century who are deeply respected", further stating: "The Ukrainian people deserve their historical memory— and we are strengthening this true memory". On 25 May, Melnyk and Sofia were reburied with full state honours in the presence of Volodymyr Zelenskyy, Yulia Svyrydenko, e Kyrylo Budanov, Ruslan Stefanchuk and Viktor Yushchenko. The reburial resulted in condemnation from Russia and Israel.

In May 2026,the Ukrainian government announced plans to repatriate the remains of Yevhen Konovalets and to establish a National Pantheon for distinguished Ukrainians.The government refused to answer whether the repatriation of Stepan Bandera was also planned.

== See also ==
- List of national cemeteries by country
