= History of Ukrainian nationality =

Ethnogenesis of the Ukrainians

Ukrainians
Українці

Total population
- 37,541,700 (2001)

Languages
- Ukrainian language

Religion
- Orthodox Church of Ukraine

The history of Ukrainian nationality can be traced back to the kingdom of Kievan Rus' of the 9th to 12th centuries. It was the predecessor state to what would eventually become the Eastern Slavic nations of Belarus, Russia, and Ukraine. During this time, Eastern Orthodoxy, a defining feature of Ukrainian nationalism, was incorporated into everyday life.

== Prehistory ==
=== Nomads ===
During the Iron Age, numerous tribes settled on the modern-day territory of Ukraine. In the 1st millennium BC, a tribe of people who called themselves Cimmerians made their way from Thrace and occupied the land around the Dnieper. On the Black Sea coast, the Greeks founded numerous colonies, such as Yalta. Around 700 BC, another group of people settled on the Ukrainian steppes: the Scythians, a semi-nomadic Iranic people from the Eurasian region known as Scythia. At the turn of the 4th century BC, a series of Nomadic tribes succeeded each other as the dominant force on the steppes, many of whom were Iranic in origin. First were the Sarmatians, expert warriors and herders who were known to fight on horseback. They were succeeded by the Alans. The next barbarian migration came in the 3rd century AD that was dominated by the Goths, a Germanic people who settled between the Carpathians and Black Sea. They would eventually go on to attack the Roman Empire, expelling the legions from Dacia, the Roman province on the lower Danube. The Goths were forced from their settlements around AD 370 by the Huns, who pushed them beyond the Danube. The next two nomadic hordes to traverse Ukraine were the Bulgars, who were of Turkic origin, and the Avars living in the Carpathian Basin. The Bulgarians went on to settle north of the Byzantine Empire, in present-day Bulgaria, while the Avars would settle in present-day Hungary, along with the Huns.

=== Slavs ===
Slavs are believed to have originated in the region(s) of modern-day Poland, Slovakia, or western Ukraine. During the 5th and 6th centuries, the Hunnic and Gothic kingdoms had fallen, and Slavs began to migrate in all directions, settling as far south as the Balkans, the Oder River, and the Arctic. Numerous tribes settled on either side of the Dnieper, the river that has been a symbol of Ukraine. Originally, the early Slavs divided themselves by tribe – large communal families that practiced a sort of "primitive communism". The application of technological advances to agriculture "increased productivity and rendered the collective labour of large groups no longer necessary. The clans split into smaller families; and, on the more fertile soil at least, it became possible for the small family to meet the needs of its members by restricting operations to a limited holding of land. Such land became in course of time private property."

Before the rise of Rus, the first East Slavic state, a Turkic people who adopted Judaism established an empire on the Caspian Sea that included the Caucasus, Azerbaijan, southern Russia, and eastern Ukraine. The Khazars provided a buffer for the developing Slavic tribes to develop themselves internally and migrate from their marsh birthplace. Trade between the Khazars and Swedes increased during this time, requiring the Varangians, or as they styled themselves, Rus, to follow the River Dnieper south across Eastern Europe. This is similar to what other Scandinavians did in Western Europe, specifically Normandy and England: they conquered the people and established their dynasties, becoming culturally part of the conquered population. This is the beginning of contact between future rulers and subjects. As the Khazar Empire began to crumble, two Mongolian tribes, the Pechenegs and Polovtsi pushed the Eastern Slavic tribes from the Don and lower Dnieper.

Meanwhile, the Varangians had been exploring along the many rivers of Eastern Europe, trading with the various Slavic tribes that settled there. Their tribal name was, Russ, was given to the state that Oleg of Novgorod would establish when he conquered Kiev and deposed Askold and Dir. This new political entity, called Kievan Rus', was ruled by the Varangian dynasty founded by its first prince, Rurik. This dynasty would rule Kievan Rus' and its numerous principalities years after its downfall and was only replaced in Muscovy by the Romanovs in the 17th century.

The area of early Slavdom, which roughly coincides with the territory of Ukraine, was at an important crossroad, namely, barbarian migrations from the north, south, and west. Due to a lack of natural barriers and its position at an important geographic migratory route, a multitude of tribes, peoples, and cultures contributed to the development of Ukrainian identity that is unique: neither wholly Western nor Eastern, neither wholly Asian or European.

== Rus' (9th century—13th century) ==
=== Kievan ===
Circa AD 862, the Varangians Askold and Dir organised an army and travelled down the Dnieper to Kiev in order to save the city's inhabitants from a besieging tribe. In doing so, they paved the way for the ascension of the Rurik dynasty over not just Kiev and Novgorod, but all the tribes that make up the East Slavs. The Varangians brought these Slavic tribes political cohesion by building one of the most powerful medieval kingdoms, and undoubtedly a sense of cultural cohesion with the conversion of Rus to Christianity in AD 988.

As Rus was one of the largest medieval empires, it is only natural that it would cover a variety of geographic zones. The northern reaches of Rus covered a heavily forested area called zalizya (land behind the forest) that was sparsely settled. There was not much industry or agriculture, with trade being the main economic activity. Vladimir, a city in this region, did not significantly increase its power until well into the decline of Kievan Rus'. The south of Rus was the centre of government, culture, and trade. It was much more heavily populated and prosperous, with trade and agriculture being well established and many links to western empires, such as the Byzantine Empire.

The unity of Rus was evident in the characteristics of this Medieval Slavic state. The name Rus, which is derived from the name Varangians had for themselves, is the “common name for previously separate and individually named East Slavic tribes.” The people of Rus fought common external enemies, making a distinction between “us” and “them.” There was a lack of natural internal borders that facilitated easy travel of people, goods, and communication: the Dnieper united Eastern Europe through trade. Christianity was an "ideology that helped to underpin princely authority. After the adoption of Byzantine Christianity, architecture throughout Rus became more uniform, especially when it came to churches. The adoption of local saints, such as Volodymyr the Great, strengthened local unity. There was also the fact that the elites and boyars were united by common language: Church Slavonic, which is demonstrated by the lack of translators in the courts of various princes from all parts of Kievan Rus'. Books were widely distributed as well. Lastly, the introduction of a codified set of laws, the first of its kind in Eastern Europe, by Yaroslav the Wise, called the Russka Pravda. It must have been widely used because of the many copies found.

In spite of its many unifying factors, there was a divergence between the northern and southern principalities. In 1169, Prince Andrei Bogoliubskii of Vladimir sacked Kiev, which exemplifies the princely rivalry that undermined central dynastic authority. The modern Russian language also began to form in the 11th century, due to the late consolidation of the northern Slavic tribes under Rus. More so, the conquerors and local peoples mixed their languages, mixing Finno-Ugric with Old East Slavic.

While the internal linguistic divisions of Rus were geographically defined as a north–south split within the confederation of East Slavic tribes, there was a widening gulf between the Rus elites and commoners. As previously mentioned, after the death of Grand Prince Igor, the Rus language began to develop dialectal forms, corresponding with the conquering of the northern Slavic towns such as Suzdal and Vladimir and the future nation-states of Ukraine, Belarus, and Russia. The landed elites of Rus, the boyars, spoke Church Slavonic after the conversion of the land to Christianity in AD 988 by Volodymyr the Great, negating the need for interpreters among the various princely courts of Kievan Rus'. The Rurikid dynasty was ethnically Varangian, not Slavic. Though this did not lead to drastic estrangement between the monarch and commoners, it provided friction between the boyars and the centralised authority, much like the conflicts being played out in the Kingdoms of France and England at the same time. The tension between these two classes contributed to the fall of Kievan Rus' in the face of the invasion of the Golden Horde, and eventually Rus' western-successor, Halych-Volhynia. Thus, the cultural legacy and common identity of Rus was immortalised in the language, religion, and oral traditions of the Rus peasant.

This new state was formulated on the basis of the ancient clan constitution with a new organisation for royal power overlaid. "All the power of government rested originally in the hands of the general assembly of all freemen, whose decrees were executed by elected officials, consisting in part of the war-chieftains," who became subservient to the princes of the Rurik dynasty. There was also the boyar nobility, or all of those who owned property. They served as a foil to centralised royal power and would contribute to Kievan Rus' dissolution and fragmentation before the Mongol onslaught. The royalty of Kiev rested their power on military control and over time developed a tradition of central government: the boyars in this respect had the advantage, since their institution of “noble democracy” was well established, even during the tribal era. These limitations on monarchic power led to the ruin of Kievan Rus'.

The adoption of Orthodox Christianity by Volodymyr the Great further strengthened the cultural links between the East Slavic tribes. This was needed to redefine the relations between the autocrat and the up-and-coming landowners, or boyars. By adopting a nation-wide religion, he would be able to give the nobility a license for its special behaviours and legitimize his rule and servitude of those below him. "He realised that if all the lands under his rule had a common religion, this in itself would be a powerful factor making for State consolidation and stability."

From its inception, Rus was a fragile entity as it represented a conglomeration of Slavic tribes that were united by trade, religion, rivers, and similar tongues. Yet the most divisive line in Rusyn society was that between the peasants and the Rurik dynasty. The descendants of Rurik spoke Church Slavonic, whose use was limited to this class. On the other hand, the peasants and commoners were speaking Old East Slavic. This language would begin to splinter into dialects and eventually separate languages as the kingdom of Rus fell apart.

=== Kingdom of Ruthenia ===
Kingdom of Ruthenia (or Kingdom of Galicia–Volhynia) was the spiritual and cultural successor to Kievan Rus'. It was a distinctly "Ukrainian" state, in the sense that it was not a conglomerate of diverse peoples and principalities. It was situated in the westernmost part of modern Ukraine, and at its height extended to the Black Sea. It was centred in the cities of Halych and Volhynia, and exhibited European features in government and social structure; specifically, feudal social order and mutual self-defence leagues with other Eastern European countries. The military alliances were formed with Poland, Hungary, and Romania, against the Mongol "Golden Horde", which had conquered the northern Rus principalities and the old centre of Rusyn culture, Kiev.

During the era of Golden Horde hegemony over parts of the Eastern Slavic tribes, a frontier that was lawless and sparsely populated formed on the edge of Kievan Rus' and Halych-Volhynia domains, to the south and west of these political entities. It was a no-man's land until the Ruthenian (not to be confused with modern Rusyns) peasants, merchants, and nobles began to flee there and settle it, calling the new frontier Zaporizhia, or "past the rapids". The extent of Rus control in the south was set at the first rapids on the River Dnieper. The main reason for its colonisation was the religious persecution of Orthodox Christians under Polish rule.

For two hundred years, Halych-Volhynia forged stronger links with the West, increasing the amount of Latin influence. For example, the first King of Rus, Danylo, was given his crown by the Pope as a way to increase papal influence in Eastern Orthodox lands. The geographic region spanning the steppes and connecting Latin and Byzantine religious areas through trade along the Dnieper created a region influenced by cultures of Western Europe, Eastern Europe, and Asia.

== Ukraine between Poland and Muscovy (13th century—17th century) ==
After the fall of Kievan Rus', there were two main independent Ukrainian states, the Cossack Hetmanate and the Ukrainian People's Republic after World War I. Overall, though, there has been no modern Ukrainian tradition of statehood, making it even more difficult to place the Ukrainian identity firmly in the European or Asian camps. For that matter, in the 14th to 18th centuries, scholars could not agree as to whether Ruthenians (medieval Latin term for Ukrainians and Belarusians) should be grouped with Poland or Muscovy (proto-Russia).

Even then, scholars were confused by the Ukrainian question. Ruthenians were Orthodox and spoke dialects that would evolve into middle-Ukrainian and Belarusian. During this era, Poland and Muscovy were competing to control and influence the territory of Ukraine, which meant increased European influences during critical stages of the Reformation, Renaissance, and Enlightenment, while historically conservative forces such as Orthodoxy and mythical-lore and literature were also prominent in shaping Ukrainian identity. The links between Ukraine, its neighbours, the East and West have been anything but equidistant.

There have been periods of increased cultural influence from countries like Poland, Muscovy, and Austria. This pressure has never been geographically equal. For example, Galicia had been under Polish and Austrian rule until the end of Second World War, while Right-bank Ukraine had been under nominal Tsarist rule since the Pereiaslav Agreement.

Ukrainian lands had ties to the West for a longer period of time and at crucial moments in the formation of the Ukrainian identity that made it distinct from Russian culture, which did not materialise until the last years of Tsarist rule. As far back as Kievan Rus', Rurikid dynasty members were married to Western and Central European royalty, such as the ruling houses of England and France. During the period of Polish dominance, many artistic and literary movements that originated in Europe made their way to Ukraine and Poland but not the Tsarist lands, as the Kingdom of Poland and the Polish-Lithuanian Commonwealth forcefully isolated them.

During the period of increased European cultural influence, the Ruthenian identity appears among ethnic Belarusians and Ukrainians, whose lands had been transferred to the administration of Lithuania and Poland, respectively. Ruthenian and Polish nobles often spoke Polish, Latin, and Church Slavonic in court, which added to the feeling that the Ruthenian language was the lingua franca of the peasants. The defining mark of a Ruthenian under Poland was therefore religion, as Poles are traditionally Catholic. The Rus or Rusyn identity was left to Muscovy and the Tsars as the divide between Rus and Ruthenia widened in correlation to greater Polish influence.

The final straw in severing the link of association between Rusyn and Ruthenian was the Orthodox split between the Metropolitans of Moscow and Kiev. By the 17th century, Ruthenian identity and culture have grown independent of their previous associations, and is called the Ruthenian Revival. Although many aspects of modern Ukrainian society are still being formed or would be greatly influenced by the forthcoming Cossack Revolts, Ukrainian identity had distinctly defined itself a niche in the society of the day. Vernacular Ukrainian was being used in Church services and the founding of the Rzeczpospolita by the Union of Lublin created a divergence in the Ruthenian identity between ethnic Belarusians and Ukrainians.

Petro Mohyla, Orthodox Metropolitan of Kiev and founder of the Kiev-Mohyla Academy started a reform movement with the goal of reviving the traditions of the local Orthodox Church for Ukrainians. This meant restored teachings of traditional Greek and Latin, which many saw as a reinforcement of the cultural continuum that links Rus to Ruthenia. In conjunction with the formation of distinct Cossack society, Ukrainian identity would forever take a path of its own choosing.

=== Cossacks ===
Who and what were the Cossacks are questions of great historical significance for Ukraine. In military terms, Cossacks were fast mounted infantry. They were quick and manoeuvrable like Turkish cavalry but lacked the firepower of their European counterparts. In cultural terms, they are described as possessing a "martial spirit" and esprit du corps and known for their independent attitudes and democratic practices. The name Cossack is derived from the Turkish word meaning "free man", and this is exactly how Cossacks viewed themselves: free and independent from outside influence. Their origins lie in the establishment of small communities on the outskirts of Polish and Tsarist control, to the south and west of traditional centres of Ukrainian power and culture. Ruthenian nobles, merchants, and serfs made up the majority, but there were many Turks, Poles, and Russians as well. Thus, the "Cossack nation" did not correspond geographically, socially, or ethnically to Ruthenia, but they were linked by Slavic language, Orthodox religion, and cultural legacy. They banded together for self-defence against empires and raiders of all nations; they also raided rich cities as far as the Black Sea and the Hellespont.

Many different types of Cossack communities formed over time, including the Don, Zaporizhia, Terek, and Ural hosts. They were able to withstand imperial authority because of their remoteness, which gave these free communities time to grow and organise their military potential. Over time, Cossacks began to hire themselves out as mercenaries to various armies and kingdoms. In Poland, for example, there was a registry of Cossacks who fought for the Polish crown. Over time, Cossacks took up the mantle of defenders of the Ukrainian Orthodox faith, which legitimised their rule.

The Muscovy had a similar religion and claimed that Ukrainian was a mere dialect, an inferior version of its own language. What clearly defined the boundaries of being Ukrainian was class identity: this continues all the way up to the Bolshevik Revolution. Ukrainians were in general peasants (there were a few nobles, who often assimilated into the Polish and Russian identities). Many of the peasants had been serfs under Poland or Russia, or "true" slaves under the Turks; many fled harsh treatment to the "borderland" between Turkey, Poland, and Muscovy, the area that became the Ukrainian heartland. These peasants came together and established Cossack groups with attached territorial divisions for safekeeping against raids. The Cossacks, who stood up to Polish, Turkish, and Russian imperial power, defined what it was to be Ukrainian for generations to come.

During the 19th century in Kharkiv, pride in Cossack achievements, in state-building and in keeping the rival imperial powers at bay, formed a large element of the revival of Ukrainian culture and nationalism. The leaders of the revival took "upon themselves the task of being the main support of both the Orthodox Church and Ukrainian nationality." With the Cossacks by their side, the Orthodox clergy realised that they could safely practice in Kiev, and once more, the centre of Ukrainian culture and religion moved to Kiev. The Kievan brotherhood was founded, which eventually became a university and, finally, an academy: it became the Kievska-Mohylanska Akademia. Hetman Sahaidachny and all the Brotherhood of the Zaporizhian Cossacks joined the brotherhood. Thus, Cossackhood is intrinsically tied with Ukrainian religion and culture. At the same time, Ukrainian nobles were conscious of the historical legacy that they were continuing, which extends all the way back to Kievan Rus'. "[Sahaidachny] returned to the Ukrainian population the use of their traditional electoral principle in ecclesiastical as well as in secular affairs, a principle very deeply embodied in the instincts of Ukrainians…in doing so, Sahaidachny provided Ukrainians with a method and with strength for their future struggles for national existence." The Cossack ideal of freedom can be seen in the democratic nature of the Zaporizhian Sich, the nucleus of the proto-Cossack state (the Hetmanate), and is regarded by contemporary Ukrainians as a unique foil to the authoritarian and expansionist character of "imperial" Russia.

=== Zaporozhian Sich ===
Zaporozhian Sich, or "Fortress beyond the rapids" was the centre of the Ukrainian Cossacks. From there, they organised raids and developed unique institutions of government and culture. There was immense diversity among the regiments, which led to the tradition of equality among all Cossacks. What made the Ukrainian Cossacks unique from the other Hosts was the democratic nature of their government: each district was garrisoned by a regiment, which in turn elected a leader, called an ataman; the starshyna, high-ranking Cossack officers, would elect a leader to oversee all the districts and regiments, called a hetman.

From 1600 to 1648, Cossack raids became a thorn in the side of the Polish-Lithuanian Commonwealth as they took up the defence of the Ukrainian Orthodox Church. Petro Mohyla cemented this relationship in the wake of Orthodox Church reforms.

=== Khmelnytsky Uprising ===
In 1648, the Zaporozhian Hetman Bohdan Khmelnytsky began a campaign against the Rzeczpospolita. Contrary to the label most historians assign this uprising, it was not "a war of national liberation". In the course of the struggle, the Cossacks liberated the palatinates of Kiev, Chernihiv, and Bratslav, which would form the territorial basis for the Cossack state, the Hetmanate. Red Ruthenia, or Galicia, remained a part of Poland until the Partitions of Poland, at which point it was transferred to the Habsburg Empire. This signified a fundamental shift in the goal and tactics of the Cossacks: rather than being a band of mercenaries and outlaws, they were now the protectors of the Ukrainian state, culture, and faith. After 1648, three territorial entities constituted the new Cossack state: Slobidska Ukraine, the Hetmanate, and Zaporizhia Sich.

=== Mythology ===
Some writers have speculated that the Cossacks were related to the Roxolanian Sarmatians, Iron Age inhabitants of the Ukrainian steppes. This is very similar to the justification for power used by the Polish szlachta, and gave the Cossacks a geographic and historical element to their identity, in addition to the honour of defending "Slavia Orthodoxa".

=== Cossack Hetmanate ===
The first Hetman of the legitimate political entity called the Hetmanate was Bohdan Khmelnytsky, the leader of the Cossack Uprising. This state existed from 1649 until 1764, the year in which the Zaporizhian Sich was destroyed. During this period, the state was weakened by bickering and internal division, allowing both Poland and Muscovy to expand their influence over Cossack affairs. Russia particularly wished to tighten its hold over Ukraine because of the belief that they were the spiritual successors to the legacies of Rus and Rome, an idea which gained credibility as they were the only state descended from Rus to not be dominated by a foreign power.

The Pereiaslav Agreement of 1654 between the Hetmanate and Muscovy guaranteed Cossack protection by the Tsar. Furthermore, it established the Cossack Hetmanate in Left-bank Ukraine, which was possible due to the declining fortunes of the Polish-Lithuanian Commonwealth. The Cossacks also felt more affiliation with Muscovy because it was an Orthodox state, and religion was more important than language at this time.

Cossack autonomy came to an end with the rule of the last Hetman, Ivan Mazepa. Hetman Mazepa initiated an uprising in 1709, which was the last gasp of Cossack separatism. The Tsar considered this to be treason, claiming it violated the terms of the Pereiaslav Agreement, and brutally crushed this uprising. This paved the way for Russian imperialism over Eastern Europe and its prominent position in Ukrainian history until the dissolution of the Soviet Union in 1991.

The new Cossack state was engaged in a three-way diplomatic and military conflict with the Ottoman Empire, Polish-Lithuanian Commonwealth, and the Russian Empire. From 1657 until the Great Northern War the area of Ukraine was partitioned between Russia and Poland. This led to the absorption of Slobiska Ukraine (1772), Zaporizhian Sich (1775), and the Hetmanate (1785) into Tsarist Russia. In addition, the Partitions of Poland (1772, 1793, and 1795) handed Russia central Ukraine and Volhynia, while Galicia and Bukovina fell to the Habsburg Empire.

During the reign of Catherine II of Russia, the Cossack Hetmanate's autonomy was progressively destroyed. After several earlier attempts, the office of hetman was finally abolished by the Russian government in 1764, and his functions were assumed by the Little Russian Collegium, thus fully incorporating the Hetmanate into the Russian Empire.

On 7 May 1775, Empress Catherine II issued a direct order that the Zaporozhian Sich was to be destroyed. On 5 June 1775, Russian artillery and infantry surrounded the Sich and razed it to the ground. The Russian troops disarmed the Cossacks, and the treasury archives were confiscated. The Koshovyi Otaman, Petro Kalnyshevsky, was arrested and incarcerated in exile at Solovetsky Monastery. This marked the end of the Zaporozhian Cossacks.

== Khmelnytsky's hetmanate between Austria and Russia (1764–1917) ==
=== Russia ===
With the liquidation of the Cossack state, Ukrainians became another ethnic group within the Russian Empire. Though the Treaty of Pereyaslav supposedly guaranteed the autonomy and sovereignty of the Hetmanate, the Tsar and his successors ignored this stipulation. At the same time, the Romanov dynasty pushed ahead with the construction of a distinct national identity for Russians, or an "imagined community". During this period, Ukrainian and Russian culture were similar, and it would have seemed much easier to integrate and assimilate Ukrainians into the emerging Russian consciousness.

To that effect, the Tsarist government adopted the policy of Russification, which would continue to play a major role in domestic politics within the Russian Empire and Soviet Union until the independence of Eastern European nations behind the Iron Curtain. At the start of the 18th century, Russian national identity was in its infancy and not distinct from the state. After 1785 the Romanov dynasty made a conscious effort to assimilate the Ruthenian and Cossack elites by granting them noble status within the Russian Empire. Having become part of the nobility, Ukrainians could now rise to the highest ranks of the service bureaucracy. This was only possible by being politically loyal to the Tsar and to the Romanov dynasty and by not emphasizing ethnic differences. The only bastion of Ukrainian identity lay with the peasants in the countryside, who passed on this unique identity through folk traditions, such as oral stories. This precarious hold on the past could have been eliminated had there been universal primary education including Russian language courses and history lessons that legitimised the rule of the Romanovs.

Simultaneously, the colonisation of Nova Rossiya (New Russia), or the southern and western peripheries of Ukraine, attracted a wide array of people from all over the Russian empire. This new urban and industrial area became culturally Russian. The most serious attempt to Russify the subjects of the Romanovs occurred in the reigns of the last two Tsars, Alexander III (1881–1894) and Nicholas II (1894–1917), during the last forty years of their dynasty's rule. Because serious application of the policy of Russification did not take place until so late in the attempt to create a Russian national identity, fully formed nationalities, such as the Poles, were already part of the Russian Empire. At every turn, Polish nationalism fuelled the fires of rebelliousness, which helped ignite the nationalism of other people – Lithuanians, Ukrainians, and Jews. The options of Ukrainian-Russian synthesis were drifting towards the extremes: either assimilation or resistance.

Several other reasons account for why Russification never completely eliminated Ukrainian identity:

- Russians and Ukrainians were developing in separate directions, forming the proto-national identities that would develop into modern nation-states
- Romanov Tsars attempted to create an artificial identity that traced its roots all the way back to Rus' while the Russian and Ukrainian commoners were becoming more culturally and linguistically divergent
- Imperial Russia did not have the "repressive capacity", in terms of resources, infrastructure, or government organisation, that future leaders like Lenin and Stalin had at their disposal
- the implementation of repressive policies chronologically coincided with the growing momentum of the Ukrainian movement in Galicia, under the Habsburg Empire, which helped inspire and introduce ideas that would keep Ukrainian nationalism under the Romanovs alive

Due to the critical link between Russian-occupied Ukraine and the rest of Europe that Galicia provided, and because of the banning of overtly political expressions of ethnic identity, the Ukrainian national movement transformed itself into an artistic and literary movement. During the late 18th century, many nationalities within the large empires of Europe experienced "national awakenings", which inevitably contributed to the increasing momentum that Ukrainian nationalism gained in Galicia and in the Bukovina, which was part of the Austrian Empire, making the dissemination of nationalistic ideas much easier. The legacy of Ukrainian literature goes back a millennium, which correlates to the establishment of Kievan Rus'. Examples of early Ukrainian literature are the Primary Chronicle and the Halychuna-Volhynian Chronicle. Though both of these works were written in Church Slavonic dialect, they nonetheless show a departure from Russian and Polish works of the same era (circa 11th century AD). The influence of Ukraine's literature is so powerful that, in the 18th century, "when the end of the Ukrainian nation seemed inevitable, literature had reached such a high state of development that it awoke the educated classes of the nation". Kotlarevsky (1769–1838) introduced pure vernacular literature at the turn of the 18th century. The most well-known Ukrainian artist and national hero, Taras Shevchenko (1814–1861), has a reputation as the author of poetry such as Haidamaky (1841) and Kobzar (1840). The rise of common language to such heights in literature is further proof of the distinction between Ukrainians and their neighbours. Notable bards, such as the national heroes Ivan Franko (1856–1916) and Taras Shevchenko, constructed the modern Ukrainian language while they linked the glory of Cossackdom to the cultural continuum of Ukrainian identity. Whereas previous poets and writers had viewed Polish and Russian identities as similar, or at least related, the poet Taras Shevchenko viewed "Ukrainian, Russian, and Polish identities as mutually exclusive and fundamentally hostile". Basically, Shevchenko deconstructed the idea of Ukrainian-Russian empire in the minds of the Ukrainian people.

=== Austria ===
In 1772, after the three partitions of the Polish-Lithuanian Commonwealth, the regions of Galicia (Halychyna) and Bukovina became part of the Habsburg Empire. Unlike their brethren under the domination of the Romanov Tsars, Ukrainians living within the Austrian state were not culturally repressed. In fact, The Austrian government took steps to improve the educational level of the general population and the material conditions of the Ukrainian clergy. Polish, German, and Ukrainian were taught concurrently in schools. With the ascension of Joseph II, the enlightened despot, the Austrian monarch "was inspired by an enthusiastic wish to do his best for his subjects" (Doroshenkok 571). During his reign and that of his successors, the Ukrainian-speaking clergy were able to study and worship in their own tongue. As most elites throughout Ukrainian history had either been assimilated or liquidated, the emergence of an educated and nationalistic clergy that stood up for the rights of the Ukrainian people signalled the emergence of a "national renaissance". Following the rule of Joseph II until the Revolutions of 1848, the Ukrainian clergy was enthusiastic about the ideas of a Ukrainian nation and developed it even further (Doroshenko 574).

After the turbulent revolutions of 1848 that shook the empires of Europe to their core, concessions were made to Ukrainians in Galicia. In the same year, serfdom was abolished. By 1849, the General Ruthenian Council had laid out a programme of Ukrainian aspirations which included the codification of uniform Ukrainian spelling and the division of East Slavic linguistic group into three branches: Ukrainian, Belarusian, and Russian (Doroshenko 578). During the course of these events, the Ruthenian Council made a historic declaration: "[we] are part of a great Ruthenian people that speaks the same language and numbers 15 millions, of whom two and half million live in Galicia" (Wilson 106). This represents the beginning of the acceptance that the Ruthenians who live in both Russia and Austria share the same culture and identity. Unlike Russia, Austria never attempted to create a conglomerate identity or nationalism for its state. Similarly, Ukrainians in Galicia established a distinct identity for themselves that "Ruthenians" on both sides of the political boundary separating them could claim as their own, while in Russia, Ukrainian nationalists concentrated their energy on destroying the idea of a common "Ruski" identity for Greater and Little Russia (Wilson 109). In this sense, Galicia has many parallels with Piedmont, an Italian territory that was the base for national unification.

== World War I and its consequences (1917—1920) ==
As previously mentioned, Ukrainians were politically divided between the Austrian-Hungarian Empire and the Russian Empire. When war broke out, Ukrainians were conscripted into the armies of both nations: 3.5 million fought as part of the Russian army, while a quarter-million took up arms for the Austrian throne Areas of Galicia were occupied by the Russian army and many civilians were executed for supposedly "collaborating with the enemy". One and a half million people lost their lives during the Great War

=== Revolutions of 1917 ===
The First World War (1914–1918) reshaped the political divisions of Europe fundamentally. Out of the four major land empires (Austria-Hungary, Germany, Ottoman Empire, and Russia), only one remained imperialistically intact: Russia. In the wake of the Bolshevik Revolution of 1917, Russia transformed from a dynastic entity into a socialist state. The multitude of ethnicities that were part of Russia began to demand sovereignty as early as the February Revolution, which deposed the Tsar. In March 1917, the Ukrainian People's Republic was declared. This was an extremely complicated conflict because it included a multi-sided conflict with nationalistic and ideological aspirations clashing, and served as a catalyst to the disintegration of the Russian and Austrian Empires.

=== Ukrainian People's Republic ===
The Tsentralna Rada, or the Central Council initially governed the newly independent Ukrainian state, elected nationalist historian Mykhailo Hrushevsky as its president. At this point, the Russian provisional government and the Bolsheviks were clamouring for control of Ukraine; the UPR threw its support behind the communists. The provisional government was defeated, and a Soviet Ukrainian Republic was declared in Kharkiv, a city on the left-bank of the Dnieper. To support the new communist government, the Bolsheviks sent in the Red Army. Since it lacked a sufficient armed and organised military, the Tsentralna Rada was forced to sign the Treaty of Brest-Litovsk in order to receive military aid and intervention from the German government. This was too little, too late: the Tsentralna Rada was overthrown in a coup that brought "Hetman" Pavlo Skoropadky to power.

=== Ukrainian State ===
With the Hetman coup, the name of the government changed to the Ukrainian State. Skoropadky’s conservative German-backed administration, called the Hetmanate, made major strides and inroads where the Tsentralna Rada had failed. It established a competent bureaucracy and established diplomatic ties with neighbouring countries. When the Central Powers (Germany, Austria, Ottoman Empire, and Bulgaria) lost the war and agreed to an armistice in November 1918, all German armies within Ukraine were recalled and another socialist government, the Directorate, overthrew the conservative monarchy of Skoropadsky.

=== Directorate ===
By the end of 1918, the situation for the Ukrainian National Republic was dire. As soon as the Central Powers capitulated, Lenin annulled the Treaty of Brest-Litovsk and commenced an invasion of Eastern and Central Europe. The Directorate overthrew the Hetmanate by force through the cooperation of the Sich Rifles, who had been established with the purpose of providing the Ukrainian National Republic a military defence in the volatile climate of Eastern Europe. In January 1919, the Ukrainian National Republic and the Western Ukrainian National Republic joined forces to fight the White Army, the Red Army, Polish, and Romanian forces. By the time the Paris Peace Conference had finished, Galicia was once again a part of Poland and would remain so until the start of World War II. The Directorate signed peace treaties with Poland and Romania, allowing it to focus its efforts on defeating the anti-Bolshevik and Bolshevik forces that threatened Ukraine’s newfound autonomy. In 1920, the Bolsheviks launched an offensive against Poland with the intention of spreading the socialist revolution to the heartland of Europe. The Red Army was defeated near Warsaw, forcing Lenin to sign a peace treaty with Poland.

=== Partition ===
Meanwhile, the Red Army conquered most of the Ukrainian National Republic by the end of 1920. With the signing of the Treaty of Riga, the Bolsheviks recognised the Polish claim to Galicia and other parts of western Ukraine, while the Poles recognised Soviet claims to the rest of Ukraine. Until the Nazi-Soviet invasion of Poland in 1939, Ukraine would remain divided between Poland the newly formed Union of Soviet Socialist Republics.

== Union of Soviet Socialist Republics and the Ukrainian SSR (1920—1991) ==
Though the Soviet Union was made up of a plethora of ethnicities, there was only one type of citizenship. Though passports and other official documents of identification would have the "nationality" of an individual stated, it made little to no difference. Most schooling in the USSR was done in Russian and nationalistic aspirations were rejected and crushed brutally.

=== Ukrainization ===
Initially, there was a relaxation of the "one nation, one identity" policy that had been the standard after the 18th century in Russia. With the conclusion of hostilities in Eastern Europe, the Ukrainian Soviet Socialist Republic was incorporated into the larger communist federal entity, the USSR. With the utter devastation that Eastern Europe had suffered as a result of the Russian Civil War, the Soviet government encouraged the renewal of Ukrainian culture and language as a means of bringing back Ukrainian nationals and intelligentsia to help rebuild the country economically and culturally (Doroshenko 647). Ukrainian language was used in publications, schooling, and many ethnic Ukrainians were made literate. Many ethnic Ukrainians also moved to the cities, which, in the south and west, had previously been Russian in culture. This led to a renewal of the Ukrainian national identity that expanded to most of Soviet Ukraine. With the ascension of Stalin as Secretary General of the Soviet Union, Soviet policies of multi-culturalism were abandoned, religious institutions and churches were systematically destroyed, and bourgeois nationalism was repressed with special brutality and horror.

=== Great Famine ===
The Holodomor of 1932–1933 (Holod = "hunger", mor = "death") was an artificial and organised famine that resulted in dramatic changes to the way of life and economic activity. Among them were:

- Exportation of grain to Western markets in order to provide money for industrialisation policies under the Five-Year Plans
- Subdue Ukrainian nationalism by initially targeting the intelligentsia, the leaders of the nationalist movement, and then the peasants, the base of support for Ukrainian nationalism
- Ensure the implementation of collectivised farming (unlike their Russian counterparts, Ukrainian peasants had no experience with this method of farming)

To exacerbate the situation, there was little modern farming equipment available and the steppes were experiencing a drought. Due to insufficient statistical records, estimates for the loss of life range from the low millions to as high as 10 million. With the intelligentsia liquidated prior to the famine, there was no direction for the further development of Ukrainian "high culture" and the starvation of the peasantry meant that Ukrainian nationalism would mostly stay alive in the minds of the rural peasants and the Ukrainian diaspora community until the Khrushchev thaw and Gorbachev's policies of perestroika and glasnost.

=== World War II ===
With the disintegration of the Nazi-Soviet non-aggression pact, Eastern Europe was once again fully embroiled in war. During the German occupation of Ukraine, many nationalists became disillusioned with the Nazis and Soviets because of the retention of collectivised agricultural policies and deportation of Ukrainians to forced-labour in Germany. This led to the establishment of the Ukrainian Insurgent Army, a centralised partisan movement intent upon carving out a Ukrainian state between the Axis and Soviet armies. Although it ultimately failed, it showed that the idea of an independent Ukrainian state had still not perished. In fact, most of the Ukrainians who fled to the West during and after the war kept the idea of culturally and politically united Ukraine alive.

=== Post-War/pre-independence Ukrainian SSR ===
After the end of World War II, Ukraine became a prosperous Soviet republic, with high-tech industries and an educated class of elites. However, since Ukraine sported many crucial economic sectors, such as agriculture, weapons and rocket manufacturing, it was heavily garrisoned by the Soviet armed forces and attempts were made to "Russify" the population. These policies had an enormous impact on Ukrainian elites, many of whom became high-ranking members of the Communist Party of the Soviet Union, such as Nikita Khrushchev and Leonid Brezhnev. Religion was still persecuted, with many churches being destroyed or converted into anti-religion museums, though the Uniate church survived in Western Ukraine by going underground.

In 1988, General Secretary of the Communist Party of the Soviet Union Mikhail Gorbachev began to implement his policy of glasnost, or "openness". It gave Soviet citizens the freedom of speech with the specific intent of criticising corrupt Soviet officials. Political prisoners and dissidents were released while the media became less censored and controlled. Taking the cue from the Baltic nations, many other national groups within the USSR, including Ukrainians, began to demand independence from Moscow. The Chernobyl nuclear power plant accident in northern Ukraine spurred the creation of nationalist and pro-democracy groups, notably among them Rukh, or the People’s Movement of Ukraine. These groups formed the core of resurgent Ukrainian nationalism during the dying days of the Soviet Union. Though it is unknown how large of an impact these groups had in relation to the dissolution of the USSR, such nationalist groups helped shape the modern Ukrainian identity, emphasizing links to the Cossack heritage of democracy, liberalism, and religion.

== Independent Ukraine (1991—present) ==
=== Independence ===
The first cracks in the Soviet system began with the declaration of independence of the Baltic republics: Lithuania, Estonia, and Latvia. On 24 August 1991, the Ukrainian SSR declared independence from the USSR and renamed itself "Ukraine". On Christmas Eve, 1991, the Soviet Union formally ceased to exist.

Ukrainians domestic and abroad now found themselves in a period of flux. Under the Soviets, ethnic Russians had been sent to the national republics of the USSR: for example, in Ukraine they made up over a fifth of the population at the end of the Soviet era (ethnic Russians likely now make up less than one in six). This has made the creation of a modern Ukrainian identity difficult because of the forced imprints of Russian occupation in language, government, and values. Though a universal Ukrainian identity that includes the large Russian minority is still developing, many young adults now consciously identify themselves as Ukrainian.

=== Citizenship laws ===
Besides various special statuses given by successive occupying powers, Ukrainians have never had their own citizenship. Though they were recognised as a distinct ethnic and national group within the Union of Soviet Socialist Republics, this served no practical purpose. With independence, Ukrainian citizenship was given out on a territorial basis, rather than on ethnicity. This civic citizenship policy was a result of conflicting ideas over Ukrainian identity advocated by the Soviet elites, the political left and right.

Many left-wing parties advocated an identity that would bind all Eastern Slavs to a common political destiny, citing similar language and religion and common descent from Rus. On the political right, many saw Ukraine as possessing an “ethnic core” with which to constitute future expansion of citizenship. These ideas came together, and a legal definition of the nation was created through citizenship laws in 1991, 1997, and most recently in 2001.

- 1991 Citizenship Law: Those who were born on the territory of Ukraine, or at least one of whose parents or grandparents was born in Ukraine
- 1997 Amendment: Those who were born on or permanently resided on the territory of Ukraine, and their descendants (children, grandchildren)
- 2001 Citizenship Law: Those who were born or permanently resided on the territory of Ukraine, or at least one of whose parents, grandparents, a full-blood brother or sister, was born or permanently resided on the territory of Ukraine

== See also ==
- Gente Ruthenus, natione Polonus
