= Sofia Fedak-Melnyk =

Ukrainian economist and activist (1901–1990)

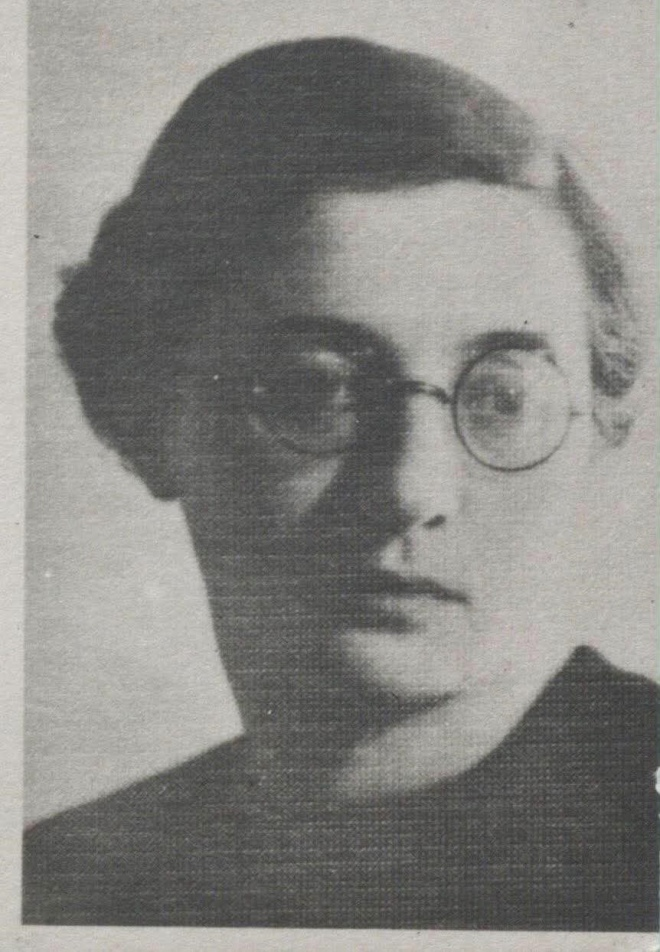
Sofia Fedak-Melnyk during the 1930s

Sofia Fedak-Melnyk (née Fedak, Ukrainian: Софія Федак-Мельник; 30 October 1901 – 31 July 1990) was a Ukrainian economist and political activist. She was best known as the wife of Ukrainian nationalist leader Andriy Melnyk.

== Biography ==
Sofia Fedak was born on 30 October 1901 in Lviv. Her father Stepan Fedak was a well-known lawyer, who would later head the city's Ukrainian community. Sofia's brother Stepan, a veteran of Ukrainian Sich Riflemen, Ukrainian Galician Army and Ukrainian People's Army, became known as an attempted assassin of Polish leader Józef Piłsudski during the latter's visit to Lviv in 1921. Her sister was married to Ukrainian officer and nationalist leader Yevhen Konovalets.

Following the Polish occupation of Galicia in the aftermath of Polish-Ukrainian War, Sofia moved to Vienna, where she studed economics at the local Trade Academy. As a student, she co-founded the first Plast organization in the Austrian capital. After returning to Lviv, Sofia worked at the Union of Ukrainian Cooperatives and became a leading member of the Ukrainian Women's Union. During that time she entered a relationship with Andriy Melnyk, who was over a decade older than her. Melnyk served as chief of general staff of the army of Ukrainian People's Republic and de facto headed the Ukrainian Military Organization in the region. In 1924 he was sentenced to 4 years of imprisonment by Polish authorities. After Melnyk's release from prison, on 28 February 1929 Sofia married him in Lviv.

In 1938, after the assassination of Yevhen Konovalets, Melnyk became his successor as head of the Organization of Ukrainian Nationalists, and moved to Italy together with Sofia. In July 1941, following Melnyk's protest against the incorporation of Galicia into the General Governorate, both were arrested and transported to Berlin, where the couple was put under house arrest. In 1944 Sofia and her husband were interned by German authorities in Sachsenhausen concentration camp. Following the end of the war, the couple moved to Luxembourg together with Sofia's mother, who died there in 1954. In Luxembourg Sofia worked in a bank and served as a secretary for her husband. French diplomat André François-Poncet, who was a neighbour of the family, described Sofia as a petite brunette with vivid eyes, who wore glasses and possessed fine facial features. After Melnyk's death in 1964, Sofia paid for his burial. She died in retirement on 31 July 1990.

== Burial ==
In May 2026 the remains of Sofia Fedak-Melnyk and Andriy Melnyk were transported from Luxembourg to Ukraine and solemnly reburied at the National Memorial Cemetery near Kyiv.
