= Ukrainian collaboration with Nazi Germany =

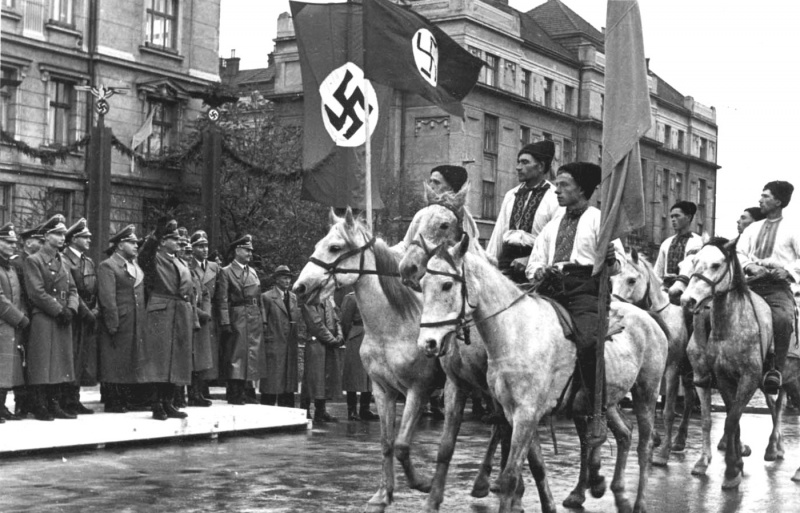
Military parade in Stanislaviv

Ukrainian collaboration with Nazi Germany took place during the occupation of Poland and the Ukrainian SSR, USSR, by Nazi Germany during the Second World War.

By September 1941, the German-occupied territory of Ukraine was divided between two new German administrative units, the District of Galicia of the Nazi General Government and the Reichskommissariat Ukraine. Some Ukrainians chose to resist and fight the German occupation forces and joined either the Red Army or the irregular partisan units conducting guerrilla warfare against the Germans. Some Ukrainians worked with or for the Nazis against the Allied forces. Ukrainian nationalists hoped that enthusiastic collaboration would enable them to re-establish an independent state. Many were involved in a series of war crimes and crimes against humanity, including the Holocaust in Ukraine, and the massacres of Poles in Volhynia and Eastern Galicia.

Ukrainians, including ethnic minorities like Belarusians, Russians, Tatars and others, who collaborated with Nazi Germany did so in various ways including participating in local administrations, in the German-supervised auxiliary police, Schutzmannschaft, in the German military, or as guards in the concentration camps.

== Background ==
Ukrainians were viewed as untermenschen by the Nazis due to being Slavic and were slated for extermination and enslavement in Generalplan Ost, but in practice, manpower issues on the Eastern Front required Nazi Germany to use locals for various tasks. While Hitler surmised that a small number of Ukrainians were descendants of ethnic Germans who settled in the region, Ukrainians were generally never deemed non-Slavic like other Slavs in Nazi Germany's racial hierarchy, such as Bulgarians and Croatians. Most of the Ukrainian nationalist leaders who collaborated with Nazi Germany were used for antisemitic and anti-Polish action, but were later arrested for their pro-Ukrainian views.

Stalin, the ruler of the USSR, and Hitler, the ruler of Nazi Germany, both demanded territory from their immediate neighbour, the Second Polish Republic. The Soviet invasion of Poland in 1939 brought together Ukrainians of the USSR and Ukrainians of what was then Eastern Poland (Kresy), under a single Soviet banner. In the territories of Poland invaded by Nazi Germany, the size of the Ukrainian minority became negligible and was gathered mostly around UCC (УЦК), formed in Kraków.

Less than two years later, Nazi Germany attacked the Soviet Union. The German Operation Barbarossa began on June 22, 1941. Operation Barbarossa brought together native Ukrainians of the USSR and the prewar territories of Poland annexed by the Soviet Union. By September the occupied territory was divided between two new German administrative units: to the southwest, the District of Galicia of the Nazi General Government, and the northeast, Reichskommissariat Ukraine, which stretched all the way to Donbas by 1943.

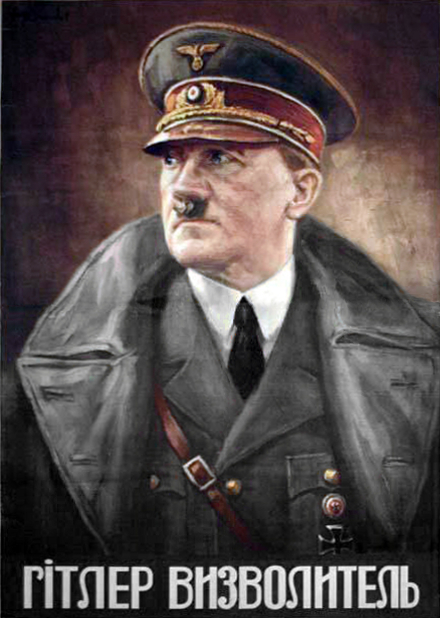
"Hitler the Liberator" poster in Ukrainian

Reinhard Heydrich noted in a report dated July 9, 1941 "a fundamental difference between the former Polish and Russian [Soviet] territories. In the former Polish region, the Soviet regime was seen as enemy rule... Hence the German troops were greeted by the Polish as well as the White Ruthenian population [meaning Ukrainian and Belarusian] for the most part, at least, as liberators or with friendly neutrality... The situation in the current occupied White Ruthenian areas of the [pre-1939] USSR has a completely different basis."

Ukrainian nationalist partisan leader Taras Bulba-Borovets gathered a force of 3,000 in summer 1941 to help the Wehrmacht fight the Red Army. In September 1942, Borovets entered into negotiations with the Soviet partisans of Dmitry Medvedev. They tried to attract him to the struggle against the Germans but could not reach an agreement. Borovets refused to obey the Soviet command structure and feared German retaliation against Ukrainian civilians. Still, until the spring of 1943 neutrality was maintained between the Borovets detachments and the Soviet partisans. Parallel to the negotiations with the Soviets, Borovets continued to try to reach an agreement with the Germans. In November 1942, he met with Obersturmbannführer Puts, the head of the security service of Volhynia and Podolia general district.

In November 1943, during negotiations with the Germans, Borovets was arrested by the Gestapo in Warsaw and incarcerated in Sachsenhausen concentration camp. In the autumn of 1944, the Nazis, looking for Ukrainian support in a war they were by then losing, freed Borovets. He was forced to change his nom de guerre to Kononenko and under this name he led the formation of a Ukrainian special forces detachment of around 50 men under the Waffen-SS. This detachment was to be dropped in the rear of the Red Army for guerrilla warfare. Those plans never came to fruition.

At the end of the war Hitler's Ukrainian nationalist allies demanded transfers away from the Eastern Front so that they could surrender to Allied rather than Soviet forces. Borovets' detachment surrendered to the Allies on May 10, 1945, and was interned in Rimini, Italy. Because of the fluid nature of these allegiances, historian Alfred Rieber has emphasized that labels such as "collaborators" and "resistance" have been rendered useless in describing the actual loyalty of these groups. However, in the newly annexed portions of western Ukraine, there was little to no loyalty towards the Soviet Union, whose Red Army had seized Ukraine during the Soviet invasion of Poland in September 1939.

== Occupation ==
Nationalists in western Ukraine hoped that their efforts would enable them to re-establish an independent state later on. For example, on the eve of Operation Barbarossa, as many as 4,000 Ukrainians, operating under Wehrmacht orders, sought to cause disruption behind Soviet lines. After the capture of Lviv, a highly-contentious and strategically important city with a significant Ukrainian minority, OUN leaders proclaimed a new Ukrainian State on June 30, 1941, and encouraged loyalty to the new regime in the hope that the Germans would support it. In 1939, during the German-Polish War, the OUN was "a faithful German auxiliary".

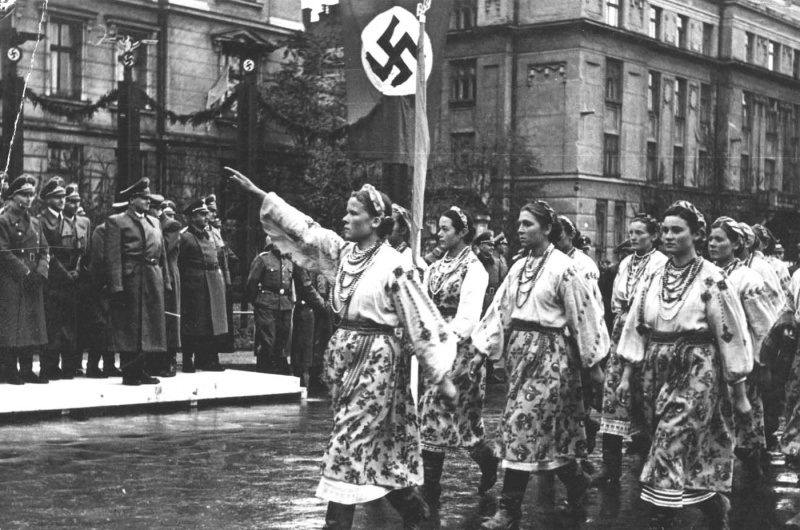
Ukrainian women dressed in national costumes salute German high command during the parade in Stanislaviv

Despite an initial warm reaction to the idea of an independent Ukraine (see Ukrainian national government (1941)), the Nazi administration had other ideas, particularly the Lebensraum programme and the total 'Aryanisation' of the population. It played the Slavic nations against one another. OUN initially carried out attacks on Polish villages to try to exterminate Polish populations or expel Polish enclaves from what the OUN fighters perceived as Ukrainian territory. This culminated in the mass killings of Polish families in Volhynia and Eastern Galicia.

According to Timothy Snyder, "something that is never said, because it's inconvenient for precisely everyone, is that more Ukrainian Communists collaborated with the Germans, than did Ukrainian nationalists." Snyder also points out that very many of those who collaborated with the German occupation also collaborated with Soviet policies in the 1930s.

== Holocaust ==
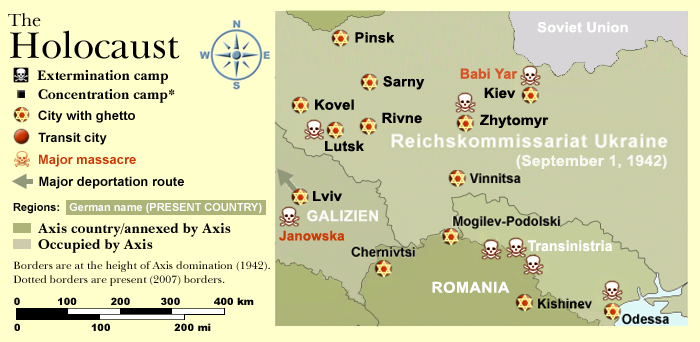
Holocaust in Reichskommissariat Ukraine: the map

The elimination of Jews during the Holocaust in Ukraine started within a few days of the beginning of the Nazi occupation. The Ukrainian Auxiliary Police, which formed mid August 1941, assisted by Einsatzgruppen C, and Police battalions rounded up Jews and undesirables for the Babi Yar massacre, as well as other later massacres in cities and towns of modern-day Ukraine, such as Kolky, Stepan, Lviv, Lutsk, Zhytomyr, and Radomyshl.

During this period, on 1 September 1941, the Nazi-sponsored Ukrainian newspaper Volhyn wrote, in an article titled Zavoiovuimo misto" (Let's Conquer the city):

"All elements that reside in our land, whether they are Jews or Poles, must be eradicated. We are at this very moment resolving the Jewish question, and this resolution is part of the plan for the Reich's total reorganization of Europe.", "The empty space that will be created, must immediately and irrevocable be filled by the real owners and masters of this land, the Ukrainian people".

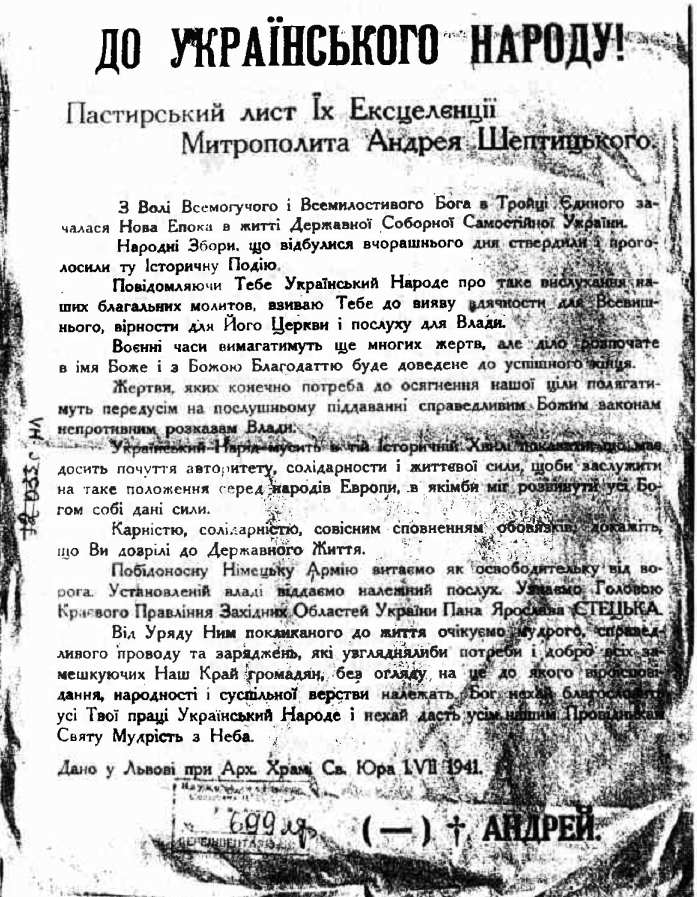
The Ukrainian clergy's address to the Ukrainians, calling them to pledge allegiance to Germany

Reinforced by religious prejudice, antisemitism turned violent in the first days of the German attack on the Soviet Union. Some Ukrainians derived nationalist resentment from the belief that the Jews had worked for Polish landlords. The NKVD prisoner massacres by the Soviet secret police while they retreated eastward were blamed on Jews. The antisemitic canard of Jewish Bolshevism provided justification for the revenge killings by the ultranationalist Ukrainian People's Militia, which accompanied German Einsatzgruppen moving east. In Boryslav (prewar Borysław, Poland, population 41,500), the SS commander gave an enraged crowd, which had seen bodies of men murdered by NKVD and laid out in the town square, 24 hours to act as they wished against Polish Jews, who were forced to clean the dead bodies and to dance and then were killed by beating with axes, pipes etc. The same type of mass murders took place in Brzezany. During Lviv pogroms, 7,000 Jews were murdered by Ukrainian nationalists, led by the Ukrainian People's Militia. As late as 1945, Ukrainian militants were still rounding up and murdering Jews.

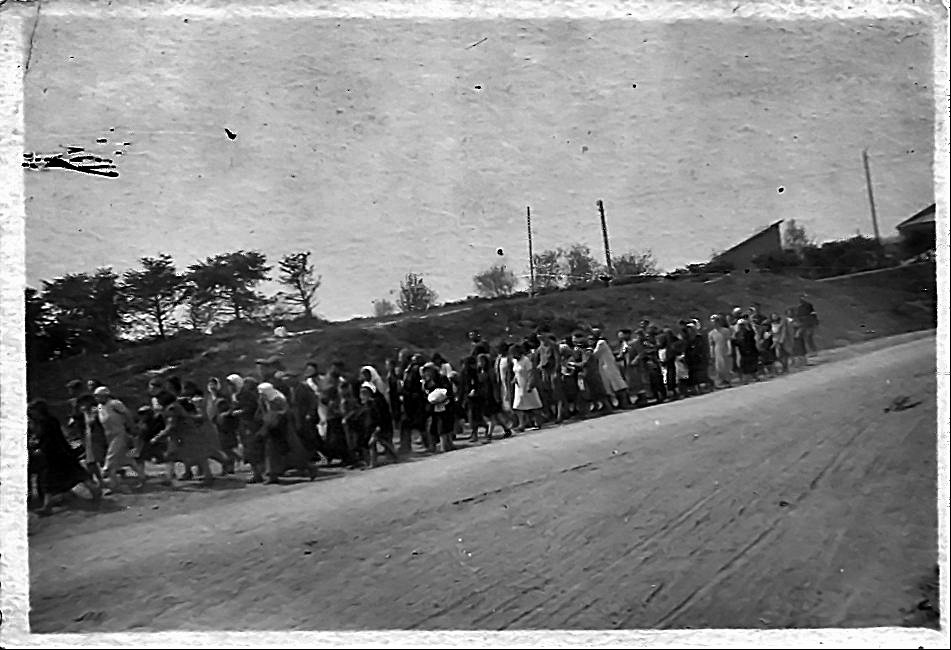
Ukrainian auxiliary police escort Jews from the Dubno ghetto to the execution site. May 1942

While some of the collaborators were civilians, others were given a choice to enlist for paramilitary service beginning in September 1941 from the Soviet prisoner-of-war camps because of ongoing close relations with the Ukrainian Hilfsverwaltung. In total, over 5,000 native Ukrainian soldiers of the Red Army signed up for training with the SS at a special Trawniki training camp to assist with the Final Solution. Another 1,000 defected during field operations. Trawniki men took a major part in the Nazi plan to exterminate European Jews during Operation Reinhard. They served at all extermination camps and played an important role in the annihilation of the Warsaw Ghetto Uprising (see the Stroop Report) and the Białystok Ghetto Uprising among other ghetto insurgencies. The men who were dispatched to death camps and Jewish ghettos as guards were never fully trusted and so were always overseen by Volksdeutsche. Occasionally, along with the prisoners they were guarding, they would kill their commanders in the process of attempting to defect.

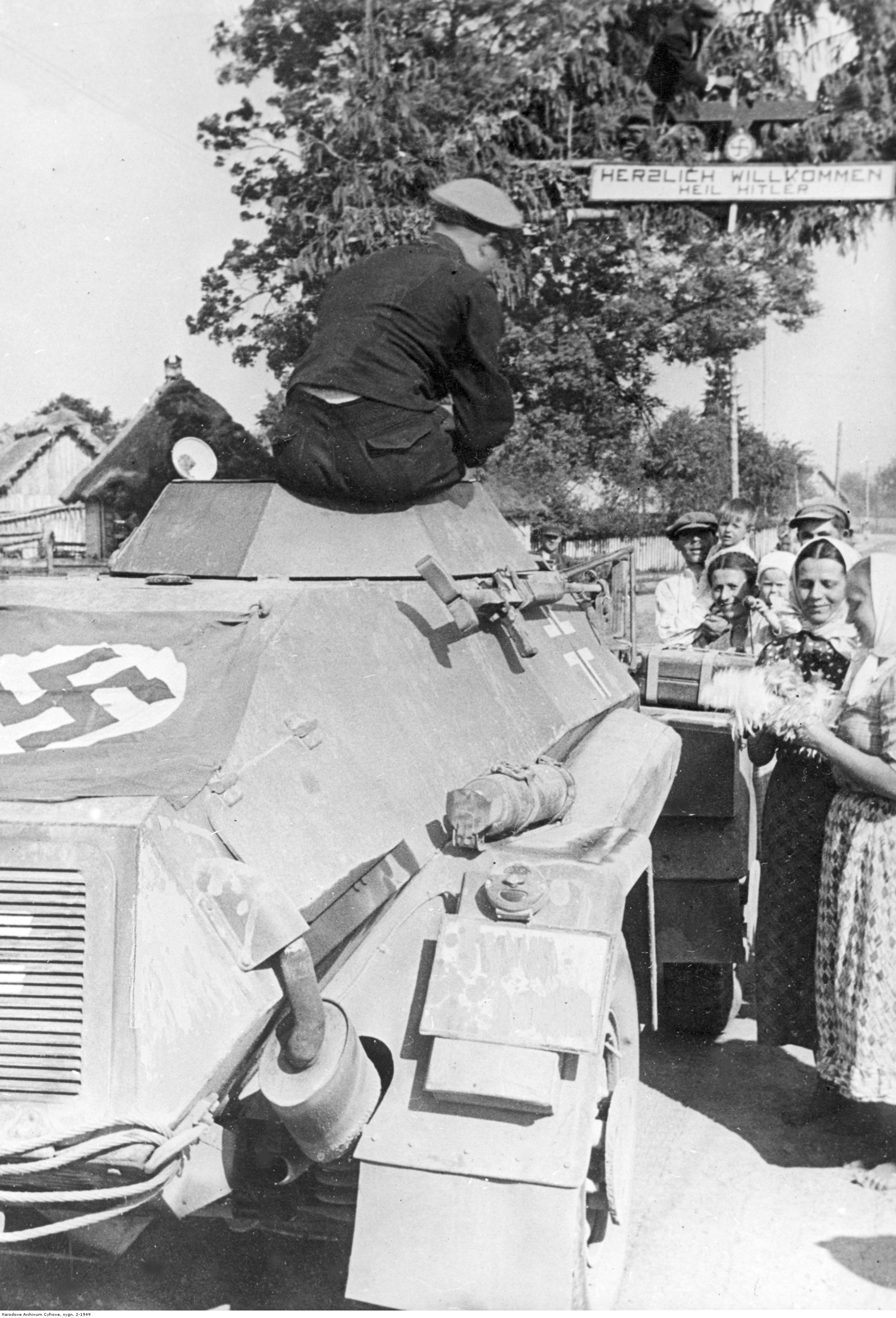
Ukrainian women greet the advancing German Army. sign in the background says "Herzlich Willkommen, Heil Hitler"

Local collaborators participated as auxiliaries in the Babi Yar massacre during the German occupation of Kyiv. In May 2006, the Ukrainian newspaper Ukraine Christian News commented, "Carrying out the massacre was the Einsatzgruppe C, supported by members of a Waffen-SS battalion and units of the Ukrainian auxiliary police, under the general command of Friedrich Jeckeln. The participation of Ukrainian collaborators in these events, now documented and proven, is a matter of painful public debate in Ukraine".

== Collaborating organizations, political movements, individuals and military volunteers ==
In total, the Germans enlisted 250,000 native Ukrainians for duty in five separate formations including the Nationalist Military Detachments (VVN), the Brotherhoods of Ukrainian Nationalists (DUN), the SS Division Galicia, the Ukrainian Liberation Army (UVV) and the Ukrainian National Army (Ukrainische Nationalarmee, UNA). By the end of 1942, in Reichskommissariat Ukraine alone, the SS employed 238,000 native Ukrainian police and 15,000 Germans, a ratio of 1 to 16.

=== Auxiliary police ===
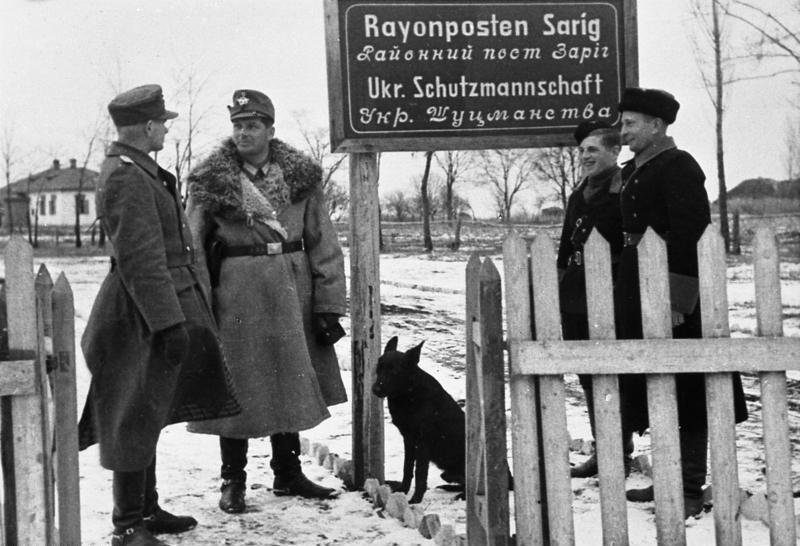
German officers visiting the Schutzmannschaft unit in Zarig, near Kiev

The 109th, 114th, 115th, 116th, 117th, 118th, 201st Ukrainian Schutzmannschaft-battalions participated in anti-partisan operations in Ukraine and Belarus. In February and March 1943, the 50th Ukrainian Schutzmannschaft Battalion participated in the large anti-guerrilla action «Operation Winterzauber» (Winter magic) in Belarus, cooperating with several Latvian and the 2nd Lithuanian battalion. Schuma-battalions burned down villages suspected of supporting Soviet partisans. On March 22, 1943, all inhabitants of the village of Khatyn in Belarus were burned alive by the Nazis in what became known as the Khatyn massacre, with the participation of the 118th Schutzmannschaft battalion.

According to Paul R. Magocsi, "Ukrainian auxiliary police and militia, or simply "Ukrainians" (a generic term that in fact included persons of non-Ukrainian as well as Ukrainian national background) participated in the overall process as policemen and camp guards".

=== Ukrainian volunteers in the German armed forces ===
- Nachtigall Battalion
- Roland Battalion
- Freiwilligen-Stamm-Division 3 and 4

=== SS Division Galicia ===
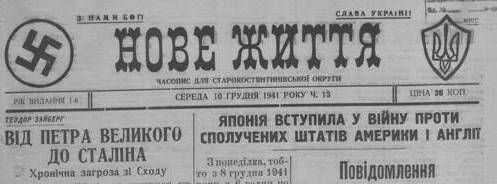
Contemporary Ukrainian newspaper with slogans such as "God with Us!" and "Glory to Ukraine!". The headlines read: "From Peter the Great to Stalin – the Eastern Menace" and "Japan declares war on the United States of America and England"

On 28 April 1943, the German Governor of the District of Galicia, Otto Wächter, and the local Ukrainian administration officially declared the creation of the SS Division Galicia. Volunteers signed for service as of 3 June 1943 and numbered 80,000. On 27 July 1944, the division was formed into the Waffen-SS as 14th Waffen Grenadier Division of the SS (1st Galician).

Sol Litman of the Simon Wiesenthal Center states that there are many proven and documented incidents of atrocities and massacres committed by the unit against Poles and Jews during World War II. Official SS records show that the 4, 5, 6 and 7 SS-Freiwilligen regiments were under Ordnungspolizei command during the accusations. See 14th Waffen Grenadier Division of SS, the 1st Galician: Atrocities and war crimes.

=== Ukrainian National Committee ===
In March 1945, the Ukrainian National Committee was set up after a series of negotiations with the Germans. The Committee represented and had command over all Ukrainian units fighting for the Third Reich, such as the Ukrainian National Army. However, it was too late, and the committee and the army were disbanded at the end of the war.

=== Ukrainian Central Committee ===
Pavlo Shandruk became the head of the National Committee, while Volodymyr Kubijovyč, the head of the Ukrainian Central Committee, became his deputy. The Central Committee was the officially recognized Ukrainian community and quasi-political organization under the Nazi occupation of Poland.

=== Organization of Ukrainian Nationalists ===
- Ukrainian National Government of the Ukrainian State, led by OUN-B. Suppressed by the Nazis shortly after its establishment.

=== Heads of local Ukrainian administration and public figures under the German occupation ===
- Oleksander Ohloblyn (1899–1992) in the autumn of 1941, Ohloblyn was appointed the Mayor of Kiev at the behest of the Organization of Ukrainian Nationalists (Melnyk faction). He held the post from September 21 to October 25.
- Volodymyr Bahaziy (Kiev mayor, 1941–1942,
- Leontii Forostivsky (Kiev mayor, 1942–1943)
- Fedir Bohatyrchuk (head of the Ukrainian Red Cross, 1941–1942)
- Oleksii Kramarenko (Kharkov mayor, 1941–1942, executed by Germans in 1943)
- Oleksander Semenenko (Kharkov mayor, 1942–1943)
- Paul Kozakevich (Kharkov mayor, 1943)
- Aleksandr Sevastianov (Vinnytsia mayor, 1941 – ?)

== See also ==
- Collaboration with Nazi Germany and Fascist Italy
- History of the Jews in Ukraine
- List of Ukrainian Righteous Among the Nations
