= Ukrainian Army (disambiguation) =

The Ukrainian Army or Ukrainian Ground Forces are the land force component of the Military of Ukraine.

Ukrainian Army may also refer to:

- Armed Forces of Ukraine (since 1991)
- Ukrainian National Army (1945), begun in the Wehrmacht
- Ukrainian Liberation Army (1943–45), in the Wehrmacht
- Ukrainian Insurgent Army (1941–51), of the Organization of Ukrainian Nationalists
- Ukrainian People's Revolutionary Army (1941–43), formerly Polissian Sich, Ukrainian Insurgent Army, under Taras Bulba-Borovets
- Revolutionary Insurgent Army of Ukraine (1918–24), the anarchist army of Nestor Makhno
- Ukrainian Galician Army (1918–19), of the West Ukrainian National Republic
- Army of the Ukrainian People's Republic (1917–20)
- Sich Riflemen (1917–19)
- Zaporozhian Host (1492–1775), the Cossack Army
- Druzhina (862–15th century), of Kievan Rus’
