= Petro Dyachenko =

Ukrainian National Army general (1895-1965)

- Петро Дяченко
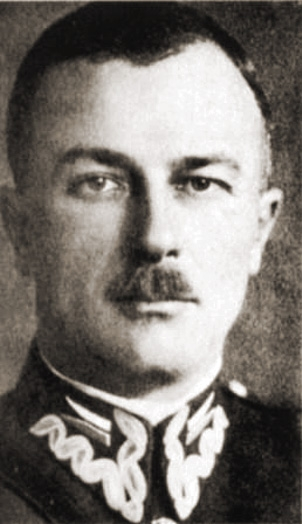
- Petro Dyachenko
- Born: January 30, 1895; Berezova Luka, Russian Empire (now Ukraine)
- Died: April 23, 1965 (aged 70); Philadelphia, Pennsylvania, United States
- Military career
- Allegiance: Russian Empire; Ukrainian People's Republic; Second Republic of Poland; Nazi Germany
- Branch: Imperial Russian Army; Ukrainian People's Army; Polish Army; Polissian Sich; Ukrainian National Army
- Service years: 1914–1945
- Rank: Lieutenant-General (UNR)
- Commands: 2nd Division UNA
- Conflicts: World War I Ukrainian War of Independence; Polish–Soviet War; World War II
- Awards: Iron Cross 2nd Class

Petro Havrylovych Dyachenko (Note: Ukrainian: Петро Гаврилович Дяченко, romanized: Petro Havrylovych Diachenko; Polish: Petro Hawryłowycz Diaczenko) (January 30, 1895 – April 23, 1965) was a military commander in different armies in Eastern Europe. In World War I, he served as a staff captain in the Russian Army, then as a colonel in the Ukrainian People's Army (1917–1921). Later he was a major in the Polish Army (1929–1939). In World War II, he was an officer of the Volhynian Legion and commander of the anti-tank brigade Vilna Ukraina and a colonel and commander of the 2nd division of the Ukrainian National Army, all of which collaborated with Nazi Germany. Dyachenko was born in Berezova Luka, Russian Empire (now Ukraine).

== Career ==
During the First World War Dyachenko served with the Russian 333rd Infantry Regiment. He joined the Ukrainian National Republic in its struggle against both White and Red Russian forces. Since February 23, 1918, he was successively in command of the 2nd Zaporozhian Rifle Regiment and 1st Zaporozhian Rifle Division of the UNR army as a battalion commander. After the reorganization of the army on July 23, 1918, he took command of the Independent Zaporozhian Rifle Regiment (formed from his battalion). After the fall of Kiev to the Bolsheviks and collapse of the Ukrainian state, he was interned in Poland together with the remaining Ukrainian soldiers. On July 20, 1928, he joined the Polish Army. In 1928 he served as company commander in the 1st Polish Chevauleger Regiment.

On January 1, 1934, he became deputy commander of the 3rd Polish Mazovian Chevauleger Regiment. As a major he fought in the Polish Army in September 1939. After capitulation, as an officer of the Polish army, he was captured and sent to a German POW Camp.

On July 25 Dyachenko became member of the Ukrainian Central Committee (UCC) formed in Kraków on the Nazi Germany side. Dyachenko was in the staff of Polissian Sich (later joining the Ukrainian Insurgent Army) in 1941. In March 1944 he took part in organizing the 31st Schutzmannschafts Battalion (Ukrainian Legion in Kholm), which collaborated with Nazi Germany. In August 1944 he became commander of the 31. Schutzmannschafts-Bataillon der SD. After the outbreak of the Warsaw Uprising, Dyachenko collaborated with Nazi Germany and organized Ukrainian military unit out of the Volhynian Legion. It is unknown if Dyachenko took part in anti-insurgent actions in Warsaw itself, but in September 1944 his unit participated in suppression of Polish partisans in the Kampinos Forest.

On January 30, 1945, Dyachenko became commander of the 3rd U.V.V Regiment. In February 1945 he commanded the Panzerjagd-Brigade Freie Ukraine (Vilna Ukraina). In April 1945 he was commander of the 2nd Division UNA. In 1945, remnants of the Vilna Ukraina were attached to General Pavlo Shandruk's army, forming the Ukrainian National Army. On May 7, 1945, Dyachenko was promoted to the rank of general by Gen. Shandruk (2nd UNA).

In May 1945 he and the remnants of the 2nd Division UNA surrendered to the US forces in Austria. Later on, he lived in West Germany and the United States.

Dyachenko died on April 23, 1965, in Philadelphia, United States.

== Legacy ==
In 2015 Dyachenko was commemorated by Ukrainian Parliament with special state celebrations in his memory, raising protests in Poland.

In 2024, in the cities of Zhmerynka, Nikopol, Pervomaysk streets were renamed after Petro Diachenko.
