= Velyki Kuskivtsi =

Rural locality in Ternopil Oblast, Ukraine

Velyki Kuskivtsi Великі Кусківці
- Location in Ternopil Oblast
- Coordinates: 49°52′14″N 25°57′10″E
- Country: Ukraine
- Oblast: Ternopil Oblast
- Raion: Kremenets Raion
- Hromada: Borsuky rural hromada
- Time zone: UTC+2 (EET)
  - Summer (DST): UTC+3 (EEST)
- Postal code: 47413

St. Michael’s Church, Velyki Kuskivtsi

Velyki Kuskivtsi (Ukrainian: Великі Кусківці) is a village in the Borsuky rural hromada of the Kremenets Raion of Ternopil Oblast in Ukraine.

== History ==
The first written mention of the village was in 1545.

After the liquidation of the Lanivtsi Raion on 19 July 2020, the village became part of the Kremenets Raion.

== Bibliography ==
- (in Ukrainian) Бондарець О., Карпович В., Великі Кусківці // Ternopil Encyclopedic Dictionary: in 4 v. / editorial board: H. Yavorskyi and other, Ternopil: "Zbruch", 2004, V. 1: А—Й, S. 241. — ISBN 966-528-197-6.
- "Kuśkowce Wielkie". Geographical Dictionary of the Kingdom of Poland (in Polish). 4. Warszawa: Kasa im. Józefa Mianowskiego. 1883. p. 949.
