= Bukovinian Ukrainian Self-Defense Army =

Bukovinian Ukrainian Self-Defense Army Буковинська українська самооборонна армія
- Active: September 1943 — May 1944
- Country: Ukraine
- Allegiance: Ukraine
- Type: partisan warfare
- Size: 1100
- Motto(s): Ukrainian: За створення Самостійної Соборної Української держави!, romanized: Za stvorennia Samostiinoi Sobornoi Ukrainskoi derzhavy, lit. 'For the creation of an independent, eclectic Ukrainian state'
- Engagements: Second World War

Commanders
- Notable commanders: Vasyl Shumka

The Bukovinian Ukrainian Self-Defense Army (BUSA) (Ukrainian: Буковинська українська самооборонна армія, romanized: Bukovynska ukrainska samooboronna armiia) was an underground armed formation consisting mainly of Ukrainians from Bukovina and Bessarabia during World War II. Its goal was to create an Independent Conciliar Ukrainian State.

== September 1943 – July 1944 ==
The first insurgent units, which were in fact ordinary village militias, appeared in Bukovina in autumn of 1943. However in August of that same year a wave of arrests of the OUN members swept through Bukovina, cutting off local insurgents' ties with the Organization.

In 1944 the first units of people's self-defense were created based on the OUN's formations in Bessarabia and Bukovina – they were named the Bukovinian Ukrainian Self-Defense Army (BUSA). BUSA operated mainly in the mountainous and lowland areas of Bukovina and Bessarabia. Vasyl Shumka, a village teacher with the pseudonym "Luhovyi", became the head of the army which numbered about a thousand people, mostly Ukrainians. As Bukovina was part of German-allied Romania at the time, the army's main activities were aimed at guerrilla warfare against small enemy units and propaganda among the local population. In early 1944, with the approach of the Soviet troops, BUSA started to work more closely with the OUN-UPA.

== July 1944 – May 1945 ==
In July 1944, BUSA commander V. Shumko entered into negotiations with the Germans without the permission of the Bukovinian and OUN Central Commands. For this, in early August, OUN units disarmed BUSA, and the commanders were shot. In September 1944, the remains of BUSA became the basis of the Bukovinian regiment of the Ukrainian Insurgent Army. The remnants of BUSA crossed the border after the retreating German troops, and later joined the 1st Ukrainian Kurin of the Ukrainian National Army.

== See also ==
- Stepan Bandera
