= Napadivka, Ternopil Oblast =

Rural locality in Ternopil Oblast, Ukraine

Napadivka Нападівка
- Location in Ternopil Oblast
- Coordinates: 49°53′06″N 26°02′08″E
- Country: Ukraine
- Oblast: Ternopil Oblast
- Raion: Kremenets Raion
- Hromada: Borsuky rural hromada
- Time zone: UTC+2 (EET)
  - Summer (DST): UTC+3 (EEST)
- Postal code: 47415

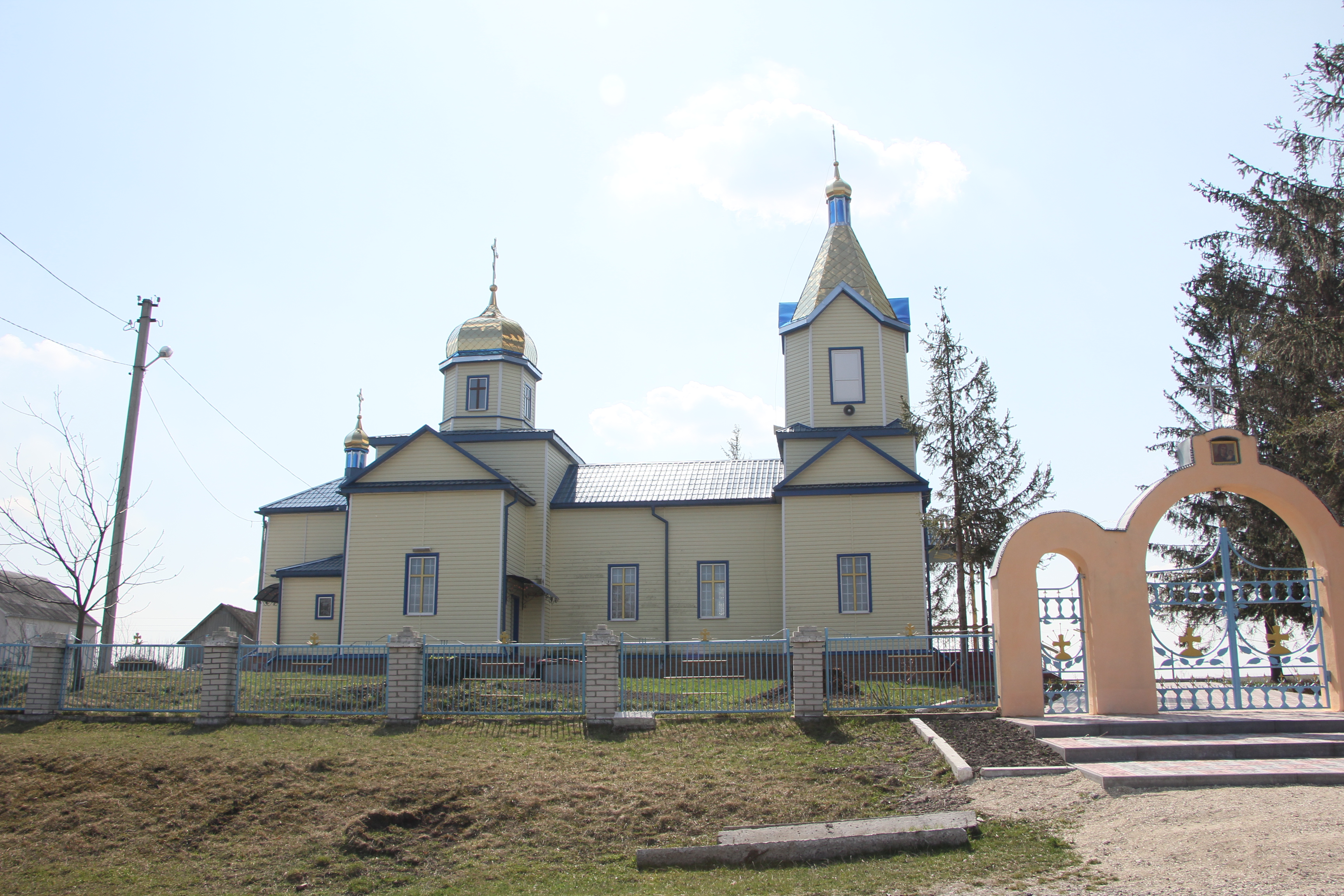
Wooden church in Napadivka, Lanivtsi District, Ternopil Oblast

Napadivka (Ukrainian: Нападівка) is a village in the Borsuky rural hromada of the Kremenets Raion of Ternopil Oblast in Ukraine.

== History ==
The first written mention of the village was in 1771.

After the liquidation of the Lanivtsi Raion on 19 July 2020, the village became part of the Kremenets Raion.

== Bibliography ==
- "Napadówka 1.), par. Łanowce". Geographical Dictionary of the Kingdom of Poland (in Polish). 6. Warszawa: Kasa im. Józefa Mianowskiego. 1885. p. 898.
- "Napadówka 1.), par. Łanowce". Geographical Dictionary of the Kingdom of Poland (in Polish). p. 369.
