= Vasyl Folvarochnyi =

Ukrainian novelist, poet, and journalist (1941–2022)

Vasyl Ivanovych Folvarochnyi
- Василь Іванович Фольварочний
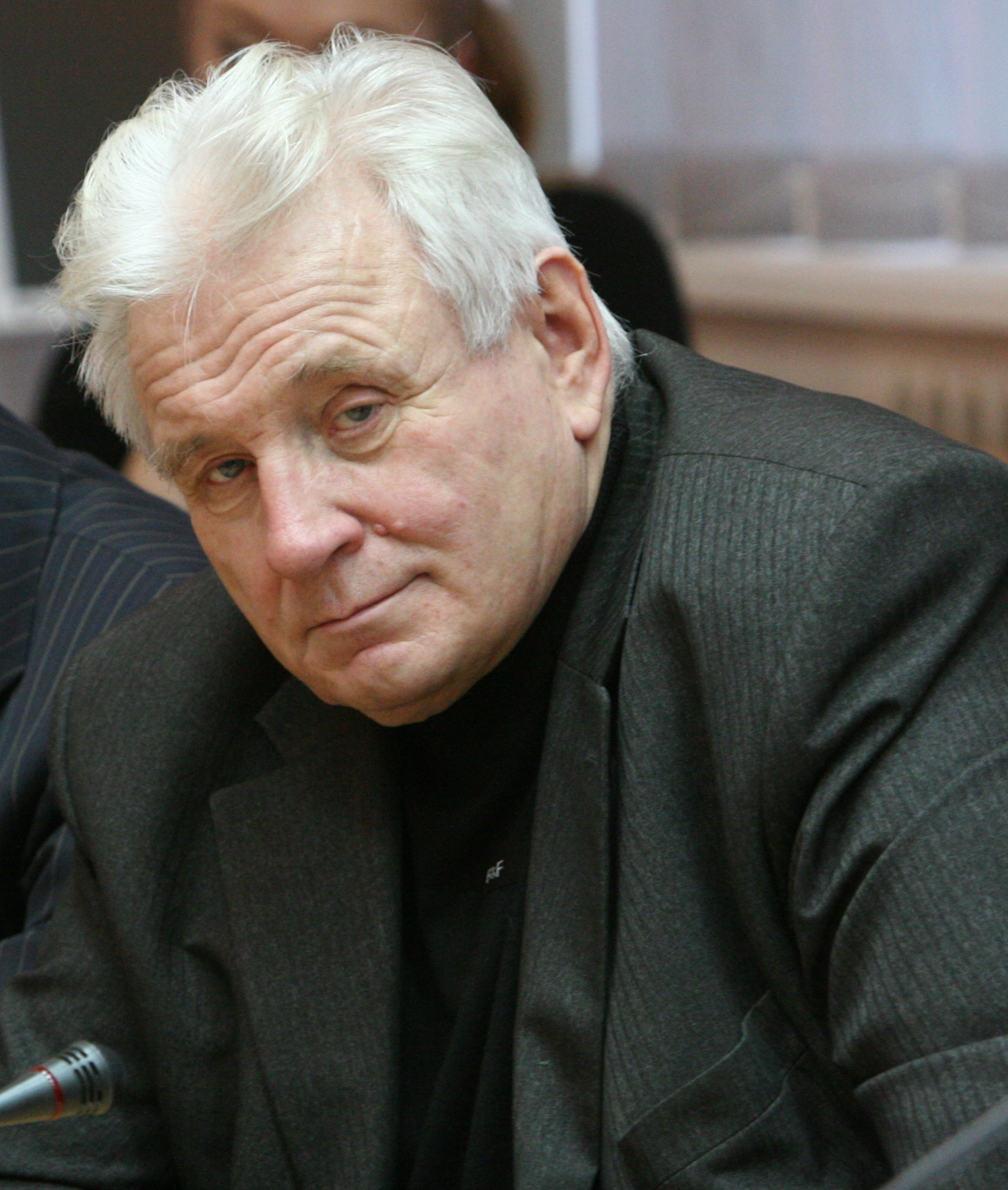
- Folvarochny in 2011
- Born: 30 January 1941; Napadivka, Lanivtsi Raion, Ukrainian SSR, USSR
- Died: 5 February 2022 (aged 81)
- Occupation: Writer
- Awards: Order of Merit (1st class); Order of Merit(2nd class); Order of Merit (3rd class); Merited Figure of Arts of Ukraine

Vasyl Ivanovych Folvarochnyi (Ukrainian: Василь Іванович Фольварочний; 30 January 1941 – 5 February 2022) was a Ukrainian novelist, poet and journalist. He was a Merited Figure of Arts of Ukraine.

== Life and career ==
Born in Napadivka, a village in the Lanivtsi Raion, Folvarochnyi started his university studies at the Chernivtsi National University and then graduated from the University of Lviv in 1963. After the university, he started working for the newspaper Young Bukovinian (Молодий буковинець/Molodyi Bukovynets).

He began publishing his literary work in 1960. A member of Komsomol and later of the National Writers' Union of Ukraine, Folvarochny wrote dozens of novels, collections of short stories, poems and essays.

During his life he was the recipient of several awards and accolades, including the title of Merited Figure of Arts of Ukraine, the Order of Saints Cyril and Methodius, and the title of Commander of the Order of Merit of Ukraine. He died on 5 February 2022, at the age of 81.

== Personal life ==
Folvarochnyi was married to writer Tetiana Pyshniuk.

== Awards ==
- Merited Figures of Arts of Ukraine (2001)
- Full Cavalier of the Order of Merit (March 23, 2006; January 20, 2010; August 22, 2016)
