= Pishchatyntsi =

Rural locality in Ternopil Oblast, Ukraine

Pishchatyntsi Піщатинці
- Location in Ternopil Oblast
- Coordinates: 49°58′13″N 25°56′5″E
- Country: Ukraine
- Oblast: Ternopil Oblast
- Raion: Kremenets Raion
- Hromada: Borsuky rural hromada
- Time zone: UTC+2 (EET)
  - Summer (DST): UTC+3 (EEST)
- Postal code: 47163

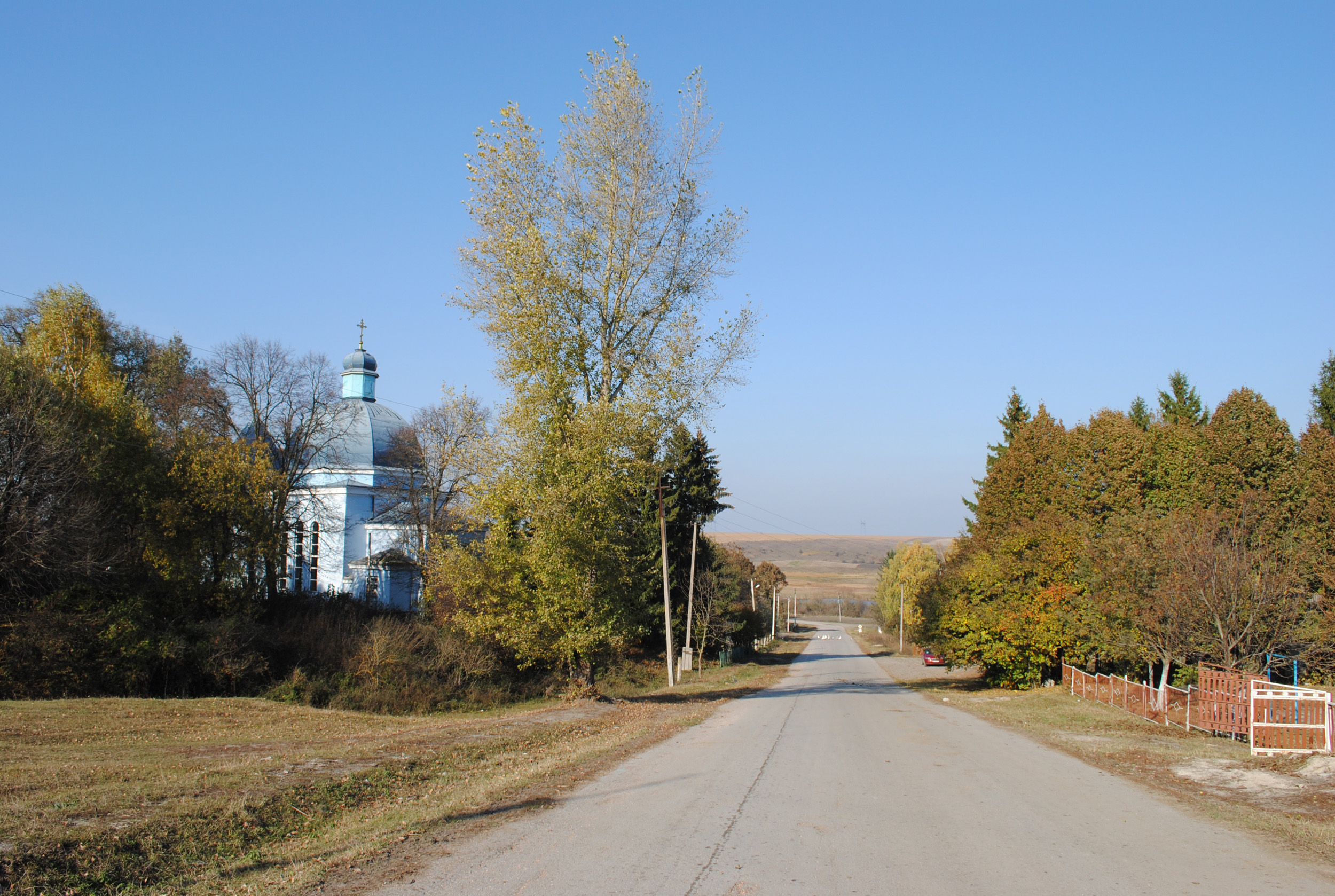
Lanovetska Street in the village of Pishchatyntsy, Shumsky district, Ternopil region, is part of the highway C201702. On the left is the Church of the Holy Mother of God

Pishchatyntsi (Ukrainian: Піщатинці) is a village in the Borsuky rural hromada of the Kremenets Raion of Ternopil Oblast in Ukraine.

== History ==
The first written mention of the village was in 1442.

After the liquidation of the Lanivtsi Raion on 19 July 2020, the village became part of the Kremenets Raion.

== Religion ==
- Church of the Nativity of the Virgin Mary

== Bibliography ==
- (in Ukrainian) Гуцал П., Особенко П., Піщатинці // Ternopil Encyclopedic Dictionary: in 4 v. / editorial board: H. Yavorskyi and other, Ternopil: "Zbruch", 2008, V. 3: П—Я, S. 92. — ISBN 978-966-528-279-2.
