= Snihurivka, Ternopil Oblast =

Rural locality in Ternopil Oblast, Ukraine

Snihurivka Снігурівка
- Location in Ternopil Oblast
- Coordinates: 49°52′59″N 25°52′29″E
- Country: Ukraine
- Oblast: Ternopil Oblast
- Raion: Kremenets Raion
- Hromada: Borsuky rural hromada
- Time zone: UTC+2 (EET)
  - Summer (DST): UTC+3 (EEST)
- Postal code: 47411

Snihurivka (Ukrainian: Снігурівка) is a village in the Borsuky rural hromada of the Kremenets Raion of Ternopil Oblast in Ukraine.

== History ==
The first written mention of the village was in 1463.

After the liquidation of the Lanivtsi Raion on 19 July 2020, the village became part of the Kremenets Raion.

== Religion ==
- Church of the Dormition

== Bibliography ==
- "Śnihorówka, pow. krzemieniecki". Geographical Dictionary of the Kingdom of Poland (in Polish). p. 601.
