= Borsuky, Ternopil Oblast =

Rural locality in Ternopil Oblast, Ukraine

Borsuky Борсуки
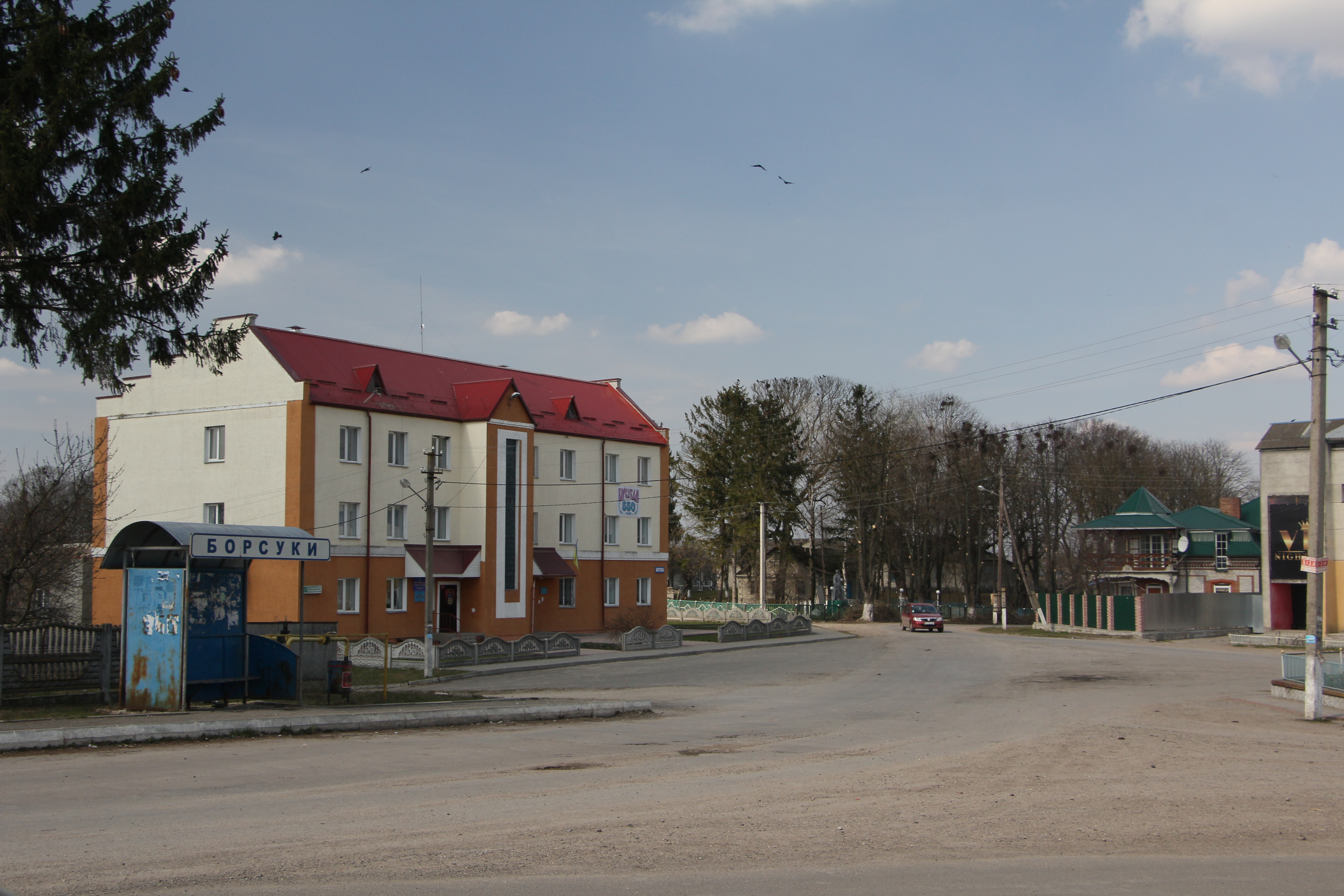
- Borsuky

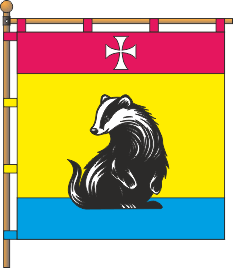
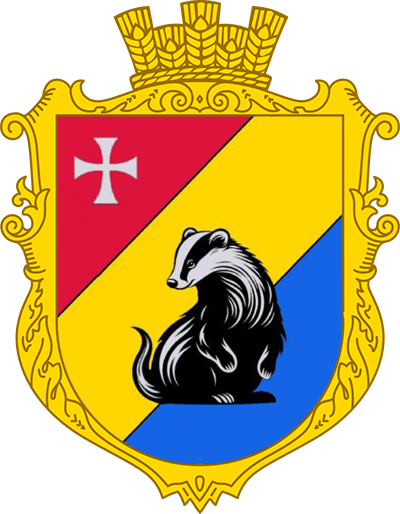
- Flag Coat of arms

- Location in Ternopil Oblast
- Coordinates: 49°53′10″N 25°59′07″E
- Country: Ukraine
- Oblast: Ternopil Oblast
- Raion: Kremenets Raion
- Hromada: Borsuky rural hromada
- Time zone: UTC+2 (EET)
  - Summer (DST): UTC+3 (EEST)
- Postal code: 47412

Borsuky (Ukrainian: Борсуки) is a village in the Borsuky rural hromada of the Kremenets Raion of Ternopil Oblast in Ukraine.

== History ==
The first written mention of the village was in 1463.

After the liquidation of the Lanivtsi Raion on 19 July 2020, the village became part of the Kremenets Raion.

== Religion ==
- Saint Nicholas church

== Notable residents ==
- Pavlo Shandruk (1889–1979), Ukrainian general

== Sources ==
- (in Ukrainian) Стецюк О., Уніят В., Борсуки // Ternopil Encyclopedic Dictionary: in 4 v. / editorial board: H. Yavorskyi and other, Ternopil: "Zbruch", 2004, V. 1: А—Й, S. 174. — ISBN 966-528-197-6.
