= Maneve =

Rural locality in Ternopil Oblast, Ukraine

Maneve Маневе
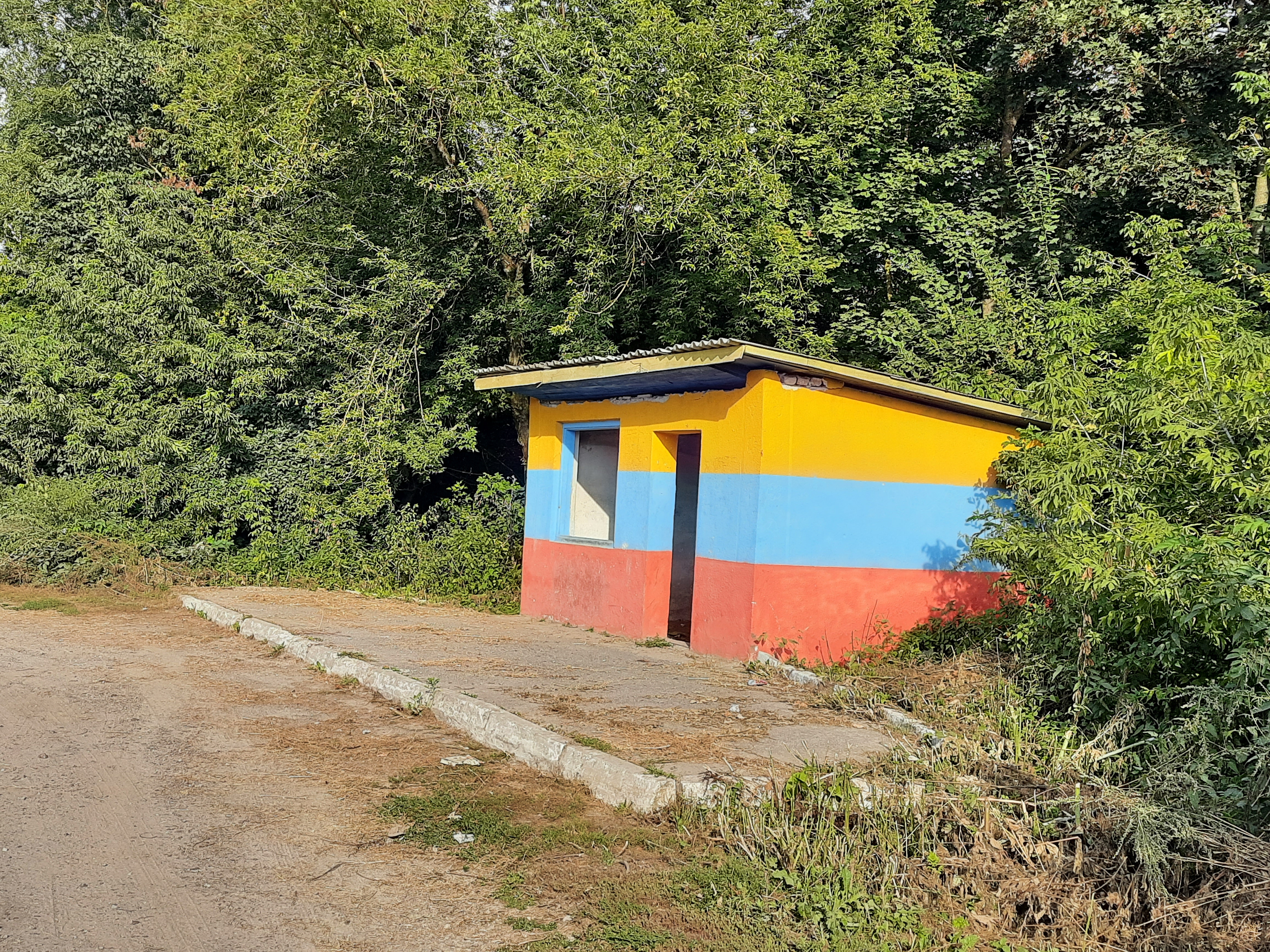
- Bus stop in Maneve

- Location in Ternopil Oblast
- Coordinates: 49°53′29″N 25°51′52″E
- Country: Ukraine
- Oblast: Ternopil Oblast
- Raion: Kremenets Raion
- Hromada: Borsuky rural hromada
- Time zone: UTC+2 (EET)
  - Summer (DST): UTC+3 (EEST)
- Postal code: 47411

Maneve (Ukrainian: Маневе) is a village in the Borsuky rural hromada of the Kremenets Raion of Ternopil Oblast in Ukraine.

== History ==
The first written mention of the village was in 1430.

After the liquidation of the Lanivtsi Raion on 19 July 2020, the village became part of the Kremenets Raion.

== Religion ==
- Saint Nicholas church
