= Synivtsi =

Rural locality in Ternopil Oblast, Ukraine

Synivtsi Синівці
- Location in Ternopil Oblast
- Coordinates: 49°51′04″N 25°58′31″E
- Country: Ukraine
- Oblast: Ternopil Oblast
- Raion: Kremenets Raion
- Hromada: Borsuky rural hromada
- Time zone: UTC+2 (EET)
  - Summer (DST): UTC+3 (EEST)
- Postal code: 47412

Synivtsi (Ukrainian: Синівці) is a village in the Borsuky rural hromada of the Kremenets Raion of Ternopil Oblast in Ukraine.

== History ==
The first written mention of the village was in 1566.

After the liquidation of the Lanivtsi Raion on 19 July 2020, the village became part of the Kremenets Raion.

== Religion ==
- Church of the Dormition

== Bibliography ==
- "Siniowce". Geographical Dictionary of the Kingdom of Poland (in Polish). p. 586.
