= Peredmirka =

Rural locality in Ternopil Oblast, Ukraine

Peredmirka Передмірка
- Location in Ternopil Oblast
- Coordinates: 49°53′30″N 25°54′02″E
- Country: Ukraine
- Oblast: Ternopil Oblast
- Raion: Kremenets Raion
- Hromada: Borsuky rural hromada
- Time zone: UTC+2 (EET)
  - Summer (DST): UTC+3 (EEST)
- Postal code: 47411

Peredmirka (Ukrainian: Передмірка) is a village in the Borsuky rural hromada of the Kremenets Raion of Ternopil Oblast in Ukraine.

== History ==
The first written mention of the village was in 1463.

After the liquidation of the Lanivtsi Raion on 19 July 2020, the village became part of the Kremenets Raion.

== Religion ==
- Saint Paraskeva church

== Bibliography ==
- (in Ukrainian) Басюк Г., Власюк І., Мельничук Б., Передмірка // Ternopil Encyclopedic Dictionary: in 4 v. / editorial board: H. Yavorskyi and other, Ternopil: "Zbruch", 2008, V. 3: П—Я, S. 48. — ISBN 978-966-528-279-2.
- "Peredmirka, pow. krzemieniecki". Geographical Dictionary of the Kingdom of Poland (in Polish). 7. Warszawa: Kasa im. Józefa Mianowskiego. 1886. p. 958.
- "Peredmirka, pow. krzemieniecki". Geographical Dictionary of the Kingdom of Poland (in Polish). p. 438.
