= Adamchuk =

Adamchuk (Russian: Адамчу́к; Ukrainian: Адамчу́к) is a Slavic surname derived from the given name Adam. Polish-language equivalent: Adamczuk.

People with the surname

- Bronyslava Adamchuk, Ukrainian Righteous Among the Nations
- Serhiy Adamchuk (born 1990), Ukrainian kickboxer
- Steffan Adamchuk, Canadian curler who participated in the 2013 Canadian Junior Curling Championships
- Vadym Adamchuk, Ukrainian athlete who participated in the Athletics at the 2010 Summer Youth Olympics – Boys' long jump event

== See also ==
- Nicholas Aloysius Adamschock, birth name of Nick Adams, American actor of Ukrainian origin
