= Mala Snihurivka =

Rural locality in Ternopil Oblast, Ukraine

Mala Snihurivka Мала Снігурівка
- Location in Ternopil Oblast
- Coordinates: 49°52′22″N 25°53′20″E
- Country: Ukraine
- Oblast: Ternopil Oblast
- Raion: Kremenets Raion
- Hromada: Borsuky rural hromada
- Time zone: UTC+2 (EET)
  - Summer (DST): UTC+3 (EEST)
- Postal code: 47411

Mala Snihurivka (Ukrainian: Мала Снігурівка) is a village in the Borsuky rural hromada of the Kremenets Raion of Ternopil Oblast in Ukraine.

== History ==
After the liquidation of the Lanivtsi Raion on 19 July 2020, the village became part of the Kremenets Raion.

== Religion ==
- Saint George church (1993)

== Bibliography ==
- "Oryszkowce 2.)". Geographical Dictionary of the Kingdom of Poland (in Polish). p. 416.
