= Borshchivka, Borsuky rural hromada, Kremenets Raion, Ternopil Oblast =

Rural locality in Ternopil Oblast, Ukraine

Borshchivka Борщівка
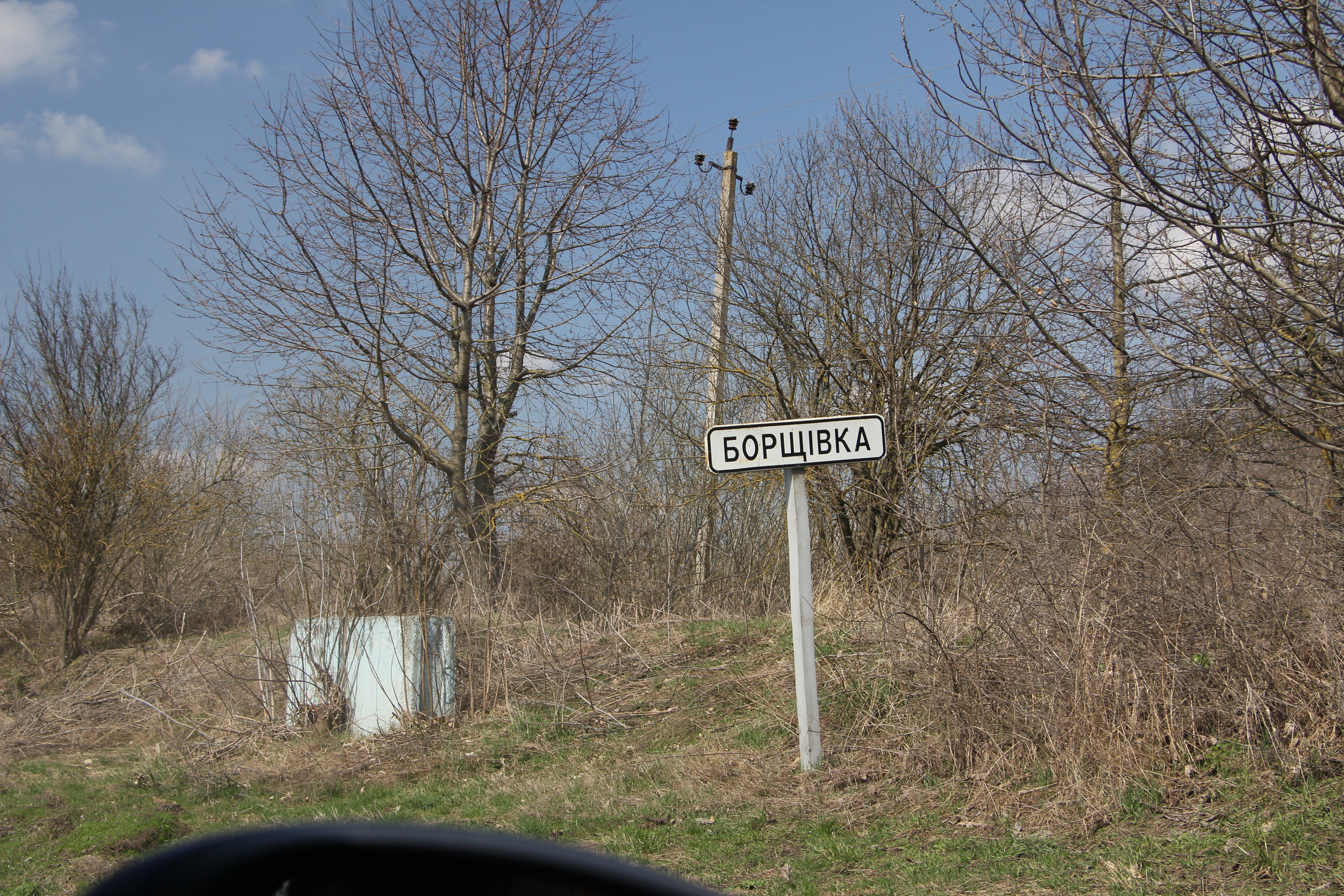
- Road sign at the entrance to the village of Borshchivka, Lanovets district, Ternopil region

- Location in Ternopil Oblast
- Coordinates: 49°55′05″N 25°56′43″E
- Country: Ukraine
- Oblast: Ternopil Oblast
- Raion: Kremenets Raion
- Hromada: Borsuky rural hromada
- Time zone: UTC+2 (EET)
  - Summer (DST): UTC+3 (EEST)
- Postal code: 47410

Borshchivka (Ukrainian: Борщівка) is a village in the Borsuky rural hromada of the Kremenets Raion of Ternopil Oblast in Ukraine.

== History ==
The first written mention of the village was in 1430.

After the liquidation of the Lanivtsi Raion on 19 July 2020, the village became part of the Kremenets Raion.

== Religion ==
- Church of the Nativity of the Virgin Mary (1753, wooden)

== Bibliography ==
- (in Ukrainian) Басюк Г., Вавринюк П., Борщівка // Ternopil Encyclopedic Dictionary: in 4 v. / editorial board: H. Yavorskyi and other, Ternopil: "Zbruch", 2004, V. 1: А—Й, S. 176. — ISBN 966-528-197-6.
- "Borszczówka (5)". Geographical Dictionary of the Kingdom of Poland (in Polish). p. 215.
