= Ukrainian National Committee =

WW2 Ukrainian Nazi Germany–aligned political structure

- Український Національний Комітет
- Abbreviation: UNK (UNC)
- Formation: 17 March 1945; 81 years ago
- Dissolved: 1945
- President: Pavlo Shandruk
- Key people: Volodymyr Kubijovyč, Oleksandr Semenenko

The Ukrainian National Committee (Ukrainian: Український Національний Комітет, romanized: Ukrainskyi Natsionalnyi Komitet [ʊkrɐˈjinʲsʲkɪj nɐts⁽ʲ⁾ioˈnɑlʲnɪj komiˈtɛt]) was a Ukrainian political structure created in October 1944 and officially recognised by the Nazi authorities under the leadership of Pavlo Shandruk, on March 17 (or March 12), 1945 in Weimar, Nazi Germany, nearly two months before the German Instrument of Surrender, with the intention to release Ukrainian Nazi-sponsored military units from the German command. After a series of negotiations, the authorities of the Third Reich officially acknowledged their recognition of the committee as the sole representative of Ukraine and Ukrainian nation, with the extraterritorial rights and the right to command the Ukrainian National Army under Ukrainian flag and national symbols.

Alfred Rosenberg was one of the initiators of creating the committee. On 23 February 1945 Rosenberg formally empowered Shandruk to head it. On 12 March 1945 he promulgated the official act of recognition of the committee:

...I recognise on behalf of the German government, the working staff of Ukrainian national representatives called into existence by you as the Ukrainian National Committee, I confirm that [UNC] is recognised by the German government as the sole representative of the Ukrainian people. [UNC] has the right to represent its views of the future of the Ukraine and to express this in declarations and manifestos.

UNC became the representative organization of Ukrainian life in the Third Reich and the political center of Ukrainian collaboration. Apart from Shandruk, Volodymyr Kubijovyč, the head of the Ukrainian Central Committee (UCC), and Oleksandr Semenenko were appointed his deputies. UNC consisted of territorial representations centered around an "émigré key:" Semenenko represented Dnieper Ukrainians and émigrés, Shandruk represented the old "Petliurite" émigrés, while the two factions of Organization of Ukrainian Nationalists, OUN-B and OUN-M, agreed to consider Kubijovyč representing Galician Ukrainians. He also represented the émigrés in the Third Reich. UNC was supported by both leaders of OUN, Stepan Bandera and Andriy Melnyk, although Melnyk remained cautious about the idea of "the last crusade against the USSR", while Bandera argued for "full support to the end, whatever it may be." However, the committee received relatively small support from OUN, as the "Melnykites" didn't have a political monopoly over UNC and tried to "maintain a clean moral slate", while Bandera already had the Ukrainian Supreme Liberation Council, which was also oriented for cooperation with the United States and Britain and conveyed a "democratic" image.

One of the main goals of creating UNC was to present the Ukrainian collaborationism as a legal, legitimate ally to Germany, and a political power which never renounced the struggle for an independent, nationalist Ukrainian state. After creating the Committee and turning the Galizien division into the First Division of the Ukrainian National Army, the collaborators claimed that neither the division nor the National Committee cooperated with the Nazis but were independent Ukrainian formations with the goals of combating the Soviet Union and making contact with the Western Allies. On March 15, Andriy Livytskyi, the President of the Ukrainian People's Republic in exile, officially recognized Shandruk and the future National Army he would command as the Armed Forces of UPR in exile. However, the Galizien division remained under tactical control of Nazi Germany until the final surrender.

Other goals were to create a strong Ukrainian émigré base by gaining new supporters from the evacuees and Ukrainian laborers in the Third Reich by providing welfare and aid over them and preventing their return to Soviet Ukraine; to prevent weakening and decreasing the OUN while strengthening a non-OUN nationalist movement; to make sure Ukrainians remaining in Germany would not be treated by a future German government as Nazi collaborators or stateless people who could be simply evicted by getting involved in the impending Cold War.

== See also ==
- National Committee of Azerbaijan
