= Word of the Righteous =

2017 documentary series

- Directed by: Svitlana Levitas and Margarita Yakovleva
- Produced by: Svitlana Levitas and Margarita Yakovleva
- Release date: 2017 (premiered)
- Countries: Ukraine; Israel; US
- Language: Ukrainian

Word of the Righteous (Ukrainian: «Слово Праведника», romanized: Slovo Pravednika) is a 2017 documentary series directed and produced by journalists Svitlana Levitas and Margarita Yakovleva, co-authors of a Ukrainian-Israeli-US project dedicated to the Righteous Among the Nations.

The film features Ukrainians who rescued Jews from the Holocaust during World War II.

== Plot ==
The film chronicles the valor and sacrifice of teenagers from Ukrainian cities and villages who, despite the life-threatening conditions, saved their Jewish friends, classmates and neighbors from the Holocaust during World War II. In commemoration of their unexampled heroism, they were awarded the honorary title "Righteous Among the Nations" by Yad Vashem, the World Holocaust Remembrance Center based in Jerusalem, Israel.

The film consists of documentary interviews with the Righteous Among the Nations and the Righteous of Ukraine. Their accounts are illustrated by courtesy photos, coupled with the photos and videos provided by The Pshenychnyi Central State Film, Photo and Sound Archives of Ukraine.

The first three episodes of the documentary series premiered in 2017 and were dedicated to Olena Malova-Zavadska, Anna Morozova, and Vasyl Nazarenko. In 2018-2019, more episodes were released to tell the stories of Sophia Boyko, Nina Bohorad and Nina Gudkova. In 2020, a new film about the Glagolev family was released.

These people are the living eyewitnesses to the terrible times of the Nazi occupation of Ukraine. Despite being elderly and ailing, they agreed to make their revelations on camera solely for the purpose of preserving the national memory of both Ukrainians and Jews. The Ukrainian-born interviewees who are officially recognized by the State of Israel as the Righteous Among the Nations share their stories in Word of the Righteous in an effort to promote international peace and understanding.

Many of the Righteous Among the Nations who have featured in the film come from Lviv Oblast, in particular:

- Ivan Vovkotrub (city of Zolochiv)
- Stefania Petrushko (city of Lviv)
- Katerina Kleban (city of Rava-Ruska).

Other heroes risked their lives to rescue Jews in Kyiv's Babi Yar and elsewhere in Ukraine, such as Anna Bebekh and Sofia Yarova. The filmmakers also interviewed many other Ukrainians who saved Jews during the Holocaust.

== Authors ==
The idea of the project belongs to Svitlana Levitas, the film was co-authored by Levitas and Yakovleva.

Levitas is a civic activist, journalist, and translator with a PhD in English literature. In 2016, she was short-listed as one of the candidates for the Global Dialogues & Women's Empowerment in Eurasian Contexts Feminist Mentoring (WEF) Programme in Oxford, England.

Yakovleva is the editor-in-chief of the Family Office media portal, editor of Forbes magazine in 2014–2017, and prize winner of several journalism awards (International Contest among business mass media journalists of Russia and Ukraine – PRESSzvanie Business Circles Prize 2008. Best journalist in Insurance (first place), Best journalist in Business and society (third place), 2009; PRESSzvanie Business Circles Prize-2011, Best journalist in Telecommunications and IT (third place), 2012.

The co-authors got acquainted in 2016 at a seminar on the history of the Holocaust at the House of the Wannsee Conference in Berlin. Principal photography for the film started in November 2016, with the first episode released in September 2017.

The episodes premiered at America House Kyiv, the Lypsky restaurant, and the Mikhail Bulgakov Museum in Kyiv.

== Project sponsors ==
The Word of the Righteous film and project are financed by Yad Vashem, Genesis Philanthropy Group, Babi Yar Holocaust Memorial Center, Ukrgasbank, Ukr.net, Ukrainian businessmen, and the authors of the film. The film is also supported by dozens of volunteers.
