= Mykhailo Omelianovych-Pavlenko =

Supreme Commander of the Ukrainian Galician Army

- Михайло Володимирович Омелянович-Павленко
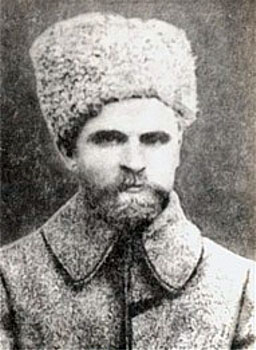
- Born: Mykhailo Volodymyrovych Omelianovych-Pavlenko; December 8, 1878; Tiflis, Russian Empire (now Tbilisi, Georgia)
- Died: May 29, 1952 (aged 73); Paris, French Fourth Republic
- Military career
- Allegiance: Russian Empire (1904–1917); West Ukrainian People's Republic (1918–1919); Ukrainian People's Republic (1919–1921); Nazi Germany (1943-1945)
- Branch: Imperial Russian Army; Ukrainian Galician Army; Ukrainian People's Army; Ukrainian Liberation Army; Hilfspolizei
- Service years: 1904–1921
- Rank: Lieutenant General
- Conflicts: Russo-Japanese War; First World War; Ukrainian–Soviet War; Second World War

Mykhailo Omelianovych-Pavlenko (Ukrainian: Михайло Володимирович Омелянович-Павленко, romanized: Mykhailo Volodymyrovych Omelianovych-Pavlenko; December 8, 1878 – May 29, 1952) was the Commander of the Ukrainian Galician Army (UHA) and the Ukrainian People's Army. Later, he served as defense minister for the exiled Ukrainian People's Republic.

== Early life ==
Mykhaylo Omelianovych-Pavlenko was born in Tbilisi (present-day Georgia). His father, Volodymyr, was an officer in the Imperial Russian Army. His mother was of a Georgian aristocratic family. Omelianovych-Pavlenko attended the military academy in Petersburg, graduating in 1900. He had a younger brother Ivan who later was fighting along with him.

== Early military service ==
Pavlenko participated in the Russo-Japanese War as a company commander. Later, in 1910, he graduated from the General Staff School.

== World War I ==
During World War I, Pavlenko served as the commander of many army units, including a Ukrainian brigade in Yekaterinoslav.

In the spring of 1917, Omelianovych-Pavlenko became an active supporter of the Ukrainian independence movement, and initiated the creation of the Odessa battalion. He also initiated Ukrainian military academies in Zhytomyr and Kamianets-Podilskyi.

On 10 December 1918, Pavlenko assumed command of the Ukrainian Halitska Army, which he led until June 1919.

After the union of the UHA and the army of the Ukrainian People's Republic, Pavlenko assumed command of the force. He served as a special attache to Symon Petlura. Omelianovych-Pavlenko commanded the army of the UNR during the First Winter Campaign (1920).

== Inter-war years ==
Pavlenko moved to Prague, where he headed the Alliance of Ukrainian Veterans' Organizations.

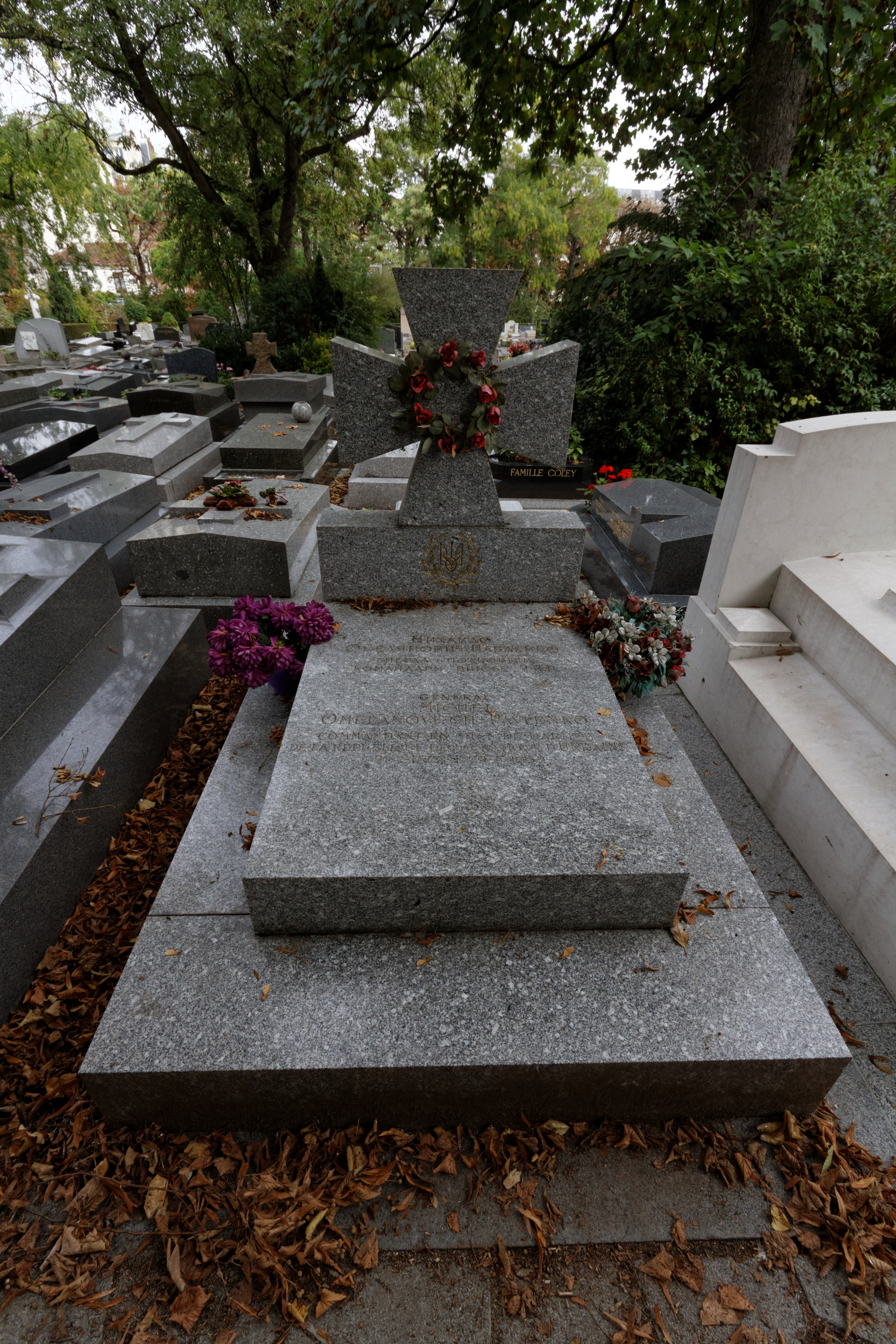
Grave in Père Lachaise Cemetery

== World War II ==
During the German invasion of the Soviet Union, Pavlenko headed a Ukrainian nationalist militia, the Ukrainian Liberation Army, that aligned itself with the Axis Powers. At its peak, it had 80,000 members.

== Later life ==
After World War II, Pavlenko moved to France, and was chosen as the defense minister for the exiled Ukrainian People's Republic from 1945 to 1948. Pavlenko was promoted to the rank of Lieutenant general.

== Legacy ==
Due to decommunization policies, a street in Kyiv that was named after the Russian general Alexander Suvorov was renamed after Omelianovych-Pavlenko in 2016.

== Publications ==
Pavlenko authored four books: The Ukrainian-Polish War of 1918–19, (published in 1929), The Winter Campaign, (published in 1934), and two books of memoirs (published in 1930 and 1935).
