= List of Ukrainian Righteous Among the Nations =

The title of Righteous Among the Nations (Note: Hebrew: חסידי אומות העולם, romanized: ḥasidei ummot ha'olam, also Chasidei Umot HaOlam; Ukrainian: Праведники народів світу, romanized: Pravednyky narodiv svitu, also Праведник світу, Pravednyk svitu) has been given by Yad Vashem, the Holocaust memorial center of Israel, to over 2,707 non-Jewish individuals who were found to have risked their lives or livelihoods to help protect and save Jews from The Holocaust in Ukraine. Prior to World War II, Ukraine was home to over 1.5 million Jews, making it the largest Jewish community in the Soviet Union and among the largest in Europe. (Note: Ukraine's Jewish population was historically large due to antisemitic Russian Empire policies that confined Jews to the Pale of Settlement—an area covering much of the empire’s non-Russian western lands, including Ukraine.) With the war's start in 1939, the Soviet annexations of eastern Poland and parts of Romania significantly increased Soviet Ukraine's Jewish population, which rose to 2.45 million, while additional hundreds of thousands arrived in the country between 1939 and 1941 as refugees fleeing Nazi-occupied Europe. The Nazi's occupation of Ukraine began with the Axis invasion of the Soviet Union (Note: Including then-Soviet Ukraine.) on 22 June 1941 and lasted until 28 October 1944, when Soviet Red Army troops completed the liberation of Ukraine's territory. By the time of the invasion, 2.7 million Jews resided in the territory making up modern-day Ukraine; (Note: The population of Jews as recorded in mid-1941, just prior to the Axis invasion of the Soviet Union, on the territory comprising modern-day Ukraine, including Crimea, which was administratively part of the Russian Soviet Federative Socialist Republic at the time. In total, Jews and people of Jewish descent made up approximately five percent of the population of Soviet Ukraine.) of this total, over 1.5 million (~60%) were murdered near their hometowns or in ghettos, (Note: The massacres were primarily carried out by Einsatzgruppen—Nazi SS paramilitary death squads—with the assistance of other Nazi and collaborators. The most substantial collaborationist forces were subordinated Ukrainian local police, military units, and other forces that generally consisted of some fascist anti-Soviet Ukrainian militias. While some Jews were deported from Ukraine to various concentration and death camps in occupied Poland, most were killed near their homes or at other locations in occupied Ukraine. Based on modern-day borders, those killed in Ukraine make up one in every four Jewish victims of the Holocaust.) approximately 900,000 fled or were evacuated into the Soviet interior, (Note: Mostly to Central Asia and Siberia.) and roughly 100,000 survived under occupation— many through the actions of Ukraine's Righteous Among the Nations. This is a partial list of Ukrainian Righteous Among the Nations:

== List ==
Righteous Among the Nations of Ukraine
Names (Note: Individuals are included and grouped based on Yad Vashem's official list of Ukraine's Righteous. Individuals recognized as Righteous after 1 January 2022 are included and grouped based on official confirmation from various sources, including Ukrainian media reports. For Righteous recognized before 2022, name transliterations, nicknames, and notable family connections between individuals are shown as indicated by Yad Vashem's records. For those recognized after 2022, modern standard Ukrainian name transliterations are used while nicknames and family connections are shown if included in multiple sources or official announcements.)	Yad Vashem No. (Note: The numerical code assigned by Yad Vashem after the nominated group or individual was officially given the title of Righteous and inscribed in Yad Vashem's records.)	Year (Note: Years in which the individual(s) were officially given the title of Righteous and included in Yad Vashem's list.)	Refs
Abramchuk Mikhail & Yekaterina	10256	2004	
Adamchuk, Bronislava	12212.1	2011	
Afanashchenko, Khavronia	13334	2016	
Afitski, Anton & Maria & ch. Antonina & Ivan	9837.1	2002	
Akhiezer Neonila (Chistiukhina)	8989	2000	
Aksenchuk, Evstahi & Anna; son Bogdan	6359	1994	
Alabusheva-Brandt, Maria	7708	1997	
Alekhina, Maria; her mother Utkina Anna	7374	1996	
Aleksiuk, Nadezhda	10182	2004	
Altynnikova, Anna	5180.1	1992	
Ambruzhuk Anna & Feodor; her mother Yevdokia	10205.1	2004	
Ananenko, Anna & daughter Feodosia	8499	2000	
Andrievskaya, Yevgenia	8318	1999	
Andriyevski, Vasili & Maria	10728	2006	
Andruschik, Manilo & Afanasia	8940	2000	
Anischuk, Boris & Yevgenia	8735.1	1999	
Anishkievich, Anna & Lukian; ds: Lidia, Yevgenia, Vera	4948	1992	
Anisimova, Natalia	8390	1999	
Antonets, Grigory & Yekaterina	7412	1996	
Antoniuk, Anna	10053	2003	
Antoniuk, Feodor; son Grigory	6476.1	1995	
Antymaniuk, Mitrofan & Anna; d. Elena	7700	1997	
Anufriev, Jozef	4536	1990	
Apanasenko, Kirill & Daria & dght. Varvara Kupchik	12500	2012	
Aponchuk, Stepan & Varvara	11389	2008	
Apraksina, Tatiana	8201	1998	
Arkhitiuk, Feodor & Olga	9543.1	2001	
Avdeenko Sergei & Tatiana; ch. Valentin, Igor	7034	1996	
Avetisyan, Inna (Lukianovich)	8113	2004	
Babaeva, Alexandra	6437.1	1995	
Babchun, Alexander & Natalia & son Feodor	8795	2000	
Babich, Maria	314	1963	
Babienko, Lidia (sister of Visokos, V.)	6799	1995	
Babkina Matryona	10456	2004	
Babyichuk, Feodor & Praskovia	12673	2013	
Bachek, Maria & son Peotr	8849	2000	
Bagno, Grigori	6591.1	1995	
Bainak, Aleksandra	13819	2019	
Bakai, Jozef & Yekaterina	7948	1998	
Balaban, Dmitri & Maria	6917	1997	
Balaban, Yuri & Maria	2068	1981	
Balanutsa, Klavdia	9636.2	2002	
Balebina, Klavdia	7561	1998	
Balitskaya, Olga	8724	2001	
Baliuk, Yevdokia	8902	2000	
Balyk, Iosip & Franciszka; dght.: Helena	6563	1995	
Banakh, Sofia & daughter Yelena	9116	2000	
Bandurski, Jan & Maria	13570	2017	
Barabash, Vera	9698	2004	
Baran, Ilya & Maria & son Grigori	9333.1	2001	
Baran, Mikhail & Agafia	9333	2001	
Baranchuk, Kirill	9230.1	2001	
Baranenko, Feodor & Natalia	7600	1997/1998	
Baranetskaya, Emilia	9142.1	2001	
Baranovskiy, Marko & Marina	13863.1	2019	
Barbaruk, Ivan & Oksenia & son Ivan	12403	2012	
Bashtannaya, Natalia	8554.1	1999	
Basova, Yelizaveta	8415.1	1999	
Bator, Aleksander & Maria	10467	2005	
Bebekh, Maksim	13566	2017	
Belegai, Mikhailo & Lubomira	10149	2003	
Beletskaya, Anna	5979.1	1994	
Belinski, Anna & Ivan	10087	2003	
Belopolskaya, Vera	8267	1999	
Belostotskaya, Maria; children Stepan & Nina; granddaughter Neonila	8699	1999	
Belous, Sofia (Perius)	12292	2011	
Belousov, Dmitry & Marina; children: Aleksander, Anna (Grek)	4495	1990	
Belova, Alexandra	6752.3	1995	
Belyi, Vasily	7109	1996	
Berezhnitski, Jas & Olena	6278	1994	
Bessmertnaya, Akulina	6318.1	1995	
Bevziuk, Nadezhda	6501	1995	
Bey, Mitrofan & Yekaterina & son Nikolai	9079	2000	
Bielski, Fruma (Dedek, Frania)	10749	2006	
Biletskiy, Leon & Maria; ch: Roman, Yaroslava	4474	1990	
Biletskiy, Yevgeni; ch:Yulian, Anna (Kifor)	4474.1	1990	
Bilichenko, Grigori	7764	1997	
Bilyk, Sofia	7698	1997	
Bilyk, Yefrosinia & dght. Maria Guzanova	10660	2006	
Binat, Yelizaveta	6917	1997	
Blanutsa, Peotr & Khristina	10117	2003	
Blashchuk, Yekaterina	11920	2010	
Blashkevich, Anton & Eugenia; d. Maria Parkhin	5909	1994	
Bobovik, Yevgenia & ch. Viktor & Yelena	9835	2002	
Bobrov, Yakov & Antosya	8662	1999	
Bobrovsky, Maria; ch: Mikhail, Nikolaj	5177	1992	
Bochkov, Georgyi	6478	2001	
Bochkova, Yevgenia; ch: Boris & Melania	6478	1995	
Bodnar, Feodor & Mariana	9576	2001	
Bodnar, Mikhail & Nina	9576.1	2001	
Bogachuk, Matvei & Anna & daughter Tatiana	9445.1	2001	
Bogaditsa, Vera & son Vladimir	13567	2017	
Bogancha, Prokofy & Yevdokia	11225	2007	
Bogdanova, Praskovia	6390	1994	
Bogoniuk, Juhim & Tekla	7233.1	1996	
Boiko Valentina	10129	2005	
Boiko, Lukia	13784	2019	
Boiko, Marina	6811	1995	
Boiko, Peotr & Lidia	10132	2003	
Boiko, Vasili & Vera	9902	2003	
Boiko, Yefrosinia; daughter Sofia	7710	1997	
Bomok, Mikhail & Maria	8987	2000	
Bondar, Aleksandra; mother Anna (Vakulskaya)	10012	2003	
Bondar, Grigoriy	13442.1	2017	
Bondar, Kleopatra	8902	2000	
Bondar, Natalia	12473.1	2012	
Bondar, Polina (Kurilenko)	8049.1	1998	
Bondar, Yekaterina	8850	2000	
Bondarchuk, Mikhail & Yevgenia	7370	1996	
Bondarenko, Ivan & Maria; ch: Ivan, Anastasia	5217	1992	
Bondarenko, Vasili & Anna	9510	2002	
Bondarenko, Yekaterina	8074	1998	
Bondarenko, Praskovia	6436.1	1995	
Bondar-Gladko, Elena	7037	1996	
Borachuk, Galina	7290	1996	
Borchakovskaya-Rudiuk, Klavdia	7149	1998	
Borchakovsky, Mikhail & Yevdokia	7149	1996	
Borisiuk, Aleksandr & Yulia	12316.1	2012	
Borisiuk, Arkhip & Faina	6983.1	1996	
Boriskina, Anastasia	6413	1994	
Borisov, Ivan & Ksenia	13822.1	2019	
Borodacheva, Daria; d. Yelena	7362	1997	
Borovskaya, Makrina	8486	1999	
Botsaniuk, Mokrina	9683.2	2002	
Botsmanovskaya, Vera	13663	2018	
Bovkun, Georgy	7248	1996	
Bovtun, Pelageya & dght. Yakilina Kasyan	13310	2016	
Boychenko, Feodor & Lidia	11700	2010	
Boyeva, Olga & her dghtrs. Lubov & Nadezhda	7670	2007	
Boyko, Vasili & Yevdokia	11010	2007	
Boykovskiy, Ivan & Mrs.	12176	2011	
Boyuk, Yevdokia & Ivan	8055	1998	
Boyus, Vaselyna	7759	1997	
Bozhkov, Stepan & Maria & daughter Tamara	8491	1999	
Breitshnaider, Anatoli	6566	1995	
Breus, Avtonom & Melania & daughter Galina	8586	1999	
Brizhak, Ivan & Olga	7257	1997	
Brizhan, Vlas	7707.2	1997	
Brizhaty, Nikolai & Maria	8075.2	1998	
Bronitskaya, Maria	9855	2003	
Brovarnik, Maria	7322	1996	
Bruyevich, Georgiy	10419.1	2004	
Budnevsky, Matvey & Yekaterina	7506	1997	
Budnik, Maria & sister Anna	8134	1999	
Budnik, Stepan & son Semion	8134	1998	
Buga, Maria & Vladimir	7908	1998	
Bugai, Vasil & Marina	9117	2001	
Bugay, Sofia	5036.1	1991	
Bukovsky, Ivan & Anna; ds. Liubov, Nadezhda	5987	1994	
Buksa, Mykola & Mikhaylina	12222	2011	
Bulyga-Polischuk, Lidia	8219.1	1999	
Burgelo, Olga	10990	2019	
Burik, Kristina; daughter Tamara	6704	1996	
Burkovskiy, Martyn	12827	2014	
Buryak, Anton & Daria	8912.1	2000	
Burygin, Nikolay & Nadezhda	11653	2009	
Bushinski, Franz	9578	2002	
Buvajlik, Grigory	5182.3	1992	
Bychenko, Raisa & her husband Antonin Ionesko	6837	1996	
Cebrynski, Tadeusz (Brother Teodosy)	421.3	1984	
Chaichuk, Ivan & Yaryna	8736	1999	
Chaika, Afanasij & Fedora; son Viktor	5178	1992	
Chaika, Sava	5962.4	1994	
Chaika, Vera	9974	2003	
Chaikovski, Stepan & Anna	10065	2003	
Chaikovski, Vladimir & his parents Teofila & Pavel	12145	2011	
Chaplinski, Grigori & Nadezhda & son Anatoli	8556	1999	
Chayun, Agrippina; d. Galina (Lapchinskaya)	5979	1994	
Chebanok, Ivan	10353.2	2004	
Chebotkov, Grigori & Anastasia	10043	2003	
Chekhova, Ludmila; daughter Natalia	5217	1992	
Chemeriskaya, Frosina; daughter Nina	10205	2004	
Chentsova, Galina; sister Valentina	6016	1994	
Cheremucha, Andrei & Anastasia; s. Valentin	4715	1990	
Cheretovich, Anatoli & Vera	9482	2001	
Cherkasova, Anna	13944	2020	
Chernetski, Vikentyi & his step-mother Lidia	6860.1	1995	
Chernetsova, Juzefa	8264.1	1998	
Cherni, Feodosi	12789	2014	
Cherni, Semion	12789.1	2014	
Chernoshtan, Vasiliy	14008.1	2020	
Chernous, Feodor & Yekaterina; ch: Maria, Aleksander	5802	1994	
Chernova, Anna & daughter Nadezhda	8337	1999	
Chernovol, Vladimir	6666	1996	
Chernyi, Ilya	14125.1	2021	
Chernyshev, Afanasi & Yelizaveta	10631	2006	
Cheshnivskaya, Anna	8959.2	2000	
Cholhan, Liubov (Hirniak)	11628	2009	
Chornaya, Maria	8219	1999	
Chudakova, Nadezhda & her daughter Nila Shemshurina	13481	2017	
Chugai, Feodor & Yevdokia	9642	2002	
Chujesh, Konstantin & Domna	9384.2	2001	
Chukhacheva, Anna	9121.2	2000	
Chulovskaya-Morozova, Neonila	7037.2	1996	
Chumak, Pavel	6860.2	1995	
Chverkaliuk, Kapitolina	8902.2	2000	
Czubatyj, Danylo & Rostislawa	10793	2006	
Danilchuk, Daria	9432.1	2001	
Danilchuk, Vasili	7340	1996	
Danilevskaya, Uliana; daughter Anastasia	10420	2004	
Daniliuk, Zonya	8147	1998	
Daniliuk, Leonida	7095	1996	
Danilko, Maria	7413.1	1997	
Danilkovich, Domna	9226	2001	
Daniuk, Yekaterina & Nikolai	7947	1998	
Dardalevich, Antonina & Iosif	9720	2003	
Darmoroz, Ivan & Lubov	9142	2001	
Datsko, Olga	10457	2004	
Davidenko, Fedor & Lubov	6734	1996	
Deineko, Mark & Lidia & dght. Oksana Antipchuk	12898	2014	
Dekhtyaruk, Andrey & Olga	11924	2010	
Demidenko, Maria	11329	2008	
Demus, Bronislawa & daughter Galina	9283	2001	
Demyanchuk, Alexey & Matriona & daughter Olga	8684	1999	
Denisenko, Tatiana	11393	2008	
Denitskiy, Aleksandr	13842	2019	
Derik, Magdalina	6213	1994	
Derun, Safron & Solomia	7201.1	1996	
Derun, Tatiana	7201	2003	
Devyatko-Belousova, Olga	8746.1	1999	
Diachuk, Alexander & Solomia & son Pavlo	9143	2000	
Didenko, Yakov & Maria	12669.1	2013	
Didukh, Andrey & Anelya & daughter Stefania Petrushka	12659	2013	
Dikalova, Vera; sister Daria Bozhko	10228	2004	
Diki, Vasili & Anna; son Nikolai	6061	1994	
Dikiy, Viktor	10461.1	2005	
Dimitruk, Gerasim	12796	2014	
Diordiev, Leonid & Olga	6881	1995	
Diordyay, Maria (Tokar)	12689	2013	
Divakova, Maria	7152	2000	
Dlozhevski, Vladimir & Maria	9863	2003	
Dmitrakova, Ludmila	9680	2002	
Dmitruk, Maria; daughters Gnatiuk, Varvara and Sofia	9753	2002	
Dobriyan, Aleksander & Stanislava	9885	2003	
Dobrovolsky, Aleksander & Yekaterina	6441	1995	
Dolgopolov, Ignat & Olga	8979	2000	
Dolinsky, Vavrik (father of Dovgoshiya H)	8004	1998	
Domanski, Ivan & Praskovia; his sister Nadezhda	4475	1990	
Domanski, Mikhail & Nadezhda	4475	1990	
Dombrovskaya, Yelena	10347.1	2004	
Domoratskaya, Valentina & son Viktor	8061.1	1999	
Domrina, Yekaterina & her husband Nikolay Nikitin & dght. Larisa	13785.1	2018	
Domuschey, Ivan & Yevdokia; son Aleksei	10353.1	2004	

== See also ==
- Word of the Righteous
