= Adamczuk =

Adamczuk is a surname. Notable people with the surname include:

- Dariusz Adamczuk (born 1969), Polish football player
- Tomasz Adamczuk (1953–1993), Polish politician

== See also ==
- Adamchuk
