= Borsuky rural hromada =

Rural hromada in Ternopil Oblast, Ukraine

Borsuky rural hromada Борсуківська сільська громада
- hromada
- Location within Ternopil Oblast Location within Ukraine
- Coordinates: 49°53′10″N 25°59′07″E
- Country: Ukraine
- Oblast: Ternopil Oblast
- Raion: Kremenets Raion
- Administrative center: Borsuky

Government
  - Hromada head: Roman Kukharskyi

Area
  - Total: 91.3 km^{2} (35.3 sq mi)

Population (2022)
  - Total: 6,235
- Villages: 11
- Website: borsukivska-gromada.gov.ua

Borsuky rural territorial hromada (Ukrainian: Борсуківська територіальна громада, romanized: Borsukivska silska terytorialna hromada) is a hromada in Ukraine, in Kremenets Raion of Ternopil Oblast. The administrative center is the village of Borsuky. Its population is 6,235 (2022 estimate) Established on 13 September 2016.

== Settlements ==
The hromada consists of 11 villages:

- Borsuky
- Borshchivka
- Velyki Kuskivtsi
- Mala Snihurivka
- Maneve
- Napadivka
- Peredmirka
- Pishchatyntsi
- Synivtsi
- Snihurivka
- Chaichyntsi
