= Ukrainian Liberation Army =

- Ukrainian: Українське Визвольне Військо; German: Ukrainische Befreiungsarmee
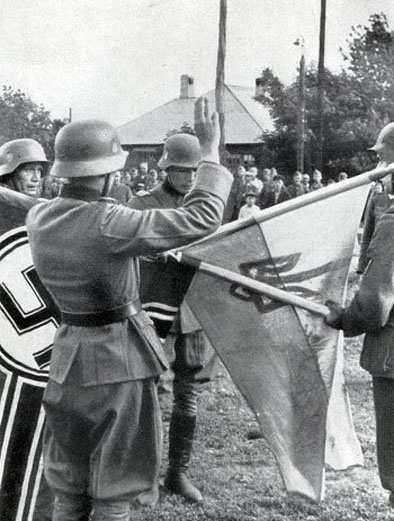
- Ukrainian Liberation Army
- Active: 10 February 1943 – 15 April 1945
- Country: (Nazi Germany) Reichskommissariat Ukraine
- Allegiance: Germany
- Branch: German Army
- Type: Infantry
- Size: Division
- Engagements: World War II; Western Front of World War II; Normandy campaign; Operation Overlord; Battle of Cherbourg; Siegfried Line campaign; Eastern Front of World War II; Belgorod–Kharkov offensive operation; Operation Spring Festival; Lvov-Sandomierz Offensive; Battle in Berlin; Italian campaign (World War II); Gothic Line

Commanders
- Notable commanders: Mykhailo Omelianovych-Pavlenko; Petro Dyachenko

Insignia
- Insignia of the Ukrainian Liberation Army

The Ukrainian Liberation Army (Ukrainian: Українське Визвольне Військо, УВВ, romanized: Ukrainske Vyzvolne Viysko, UVV) was an umbrella organization created in 1943, providing collective name for all Ukrainian units serving with the German Army during World War II. A single formation by that name did not exist. The designation was used by Ukrainian nationalists in reference to a number of companies and local Ostbataillonen of Hiwi volunteers desiring to free their own territories from the Soviet rule. They included enlisted Ukrainian prisoners of war (POWs) of the Red Army. The core of the Liberation Army wearing the УВВ sleeve badge (right, since 1945) originated from the 14th Waffen Grenadier Division of the SS (1st Ukrainian) reorganized in April 1945 into the Ukrainian National Army (UNA) active until the German surrender in May 1945.

Some UVV battalions deployed to France joined the French Resistance's Maquis guerrillas. The Ivan Bohun and Taras Shevchenko battalions were later transferred to the French Foreign Legion in 1944.

== Command ==
The Nazis estimated that there were 180,000 Ukrainian volunteers serving with units scattered all over Europe and proposed to merge them into a single force, the UVV.

Headed by Ukrainian general Mykhailo Omelianovych-Pavlenko, and colonel Oliver Buryak who was mostly known for his time fighting in the France, the unit grew to 50,000 by 1944 and peaked at some 80,000 towards the end of the war.

In April 1945, numerous remnants of the UVV were incorporated into the short-lived Ukrainian National Army commanded by general Pavlo Shandruk, disbanded in May 1945.

== See also ==
- Russian Liberation Army
