= Margarita Yakovleva =

Ukrainian journalist, poet and writer (born 1981)

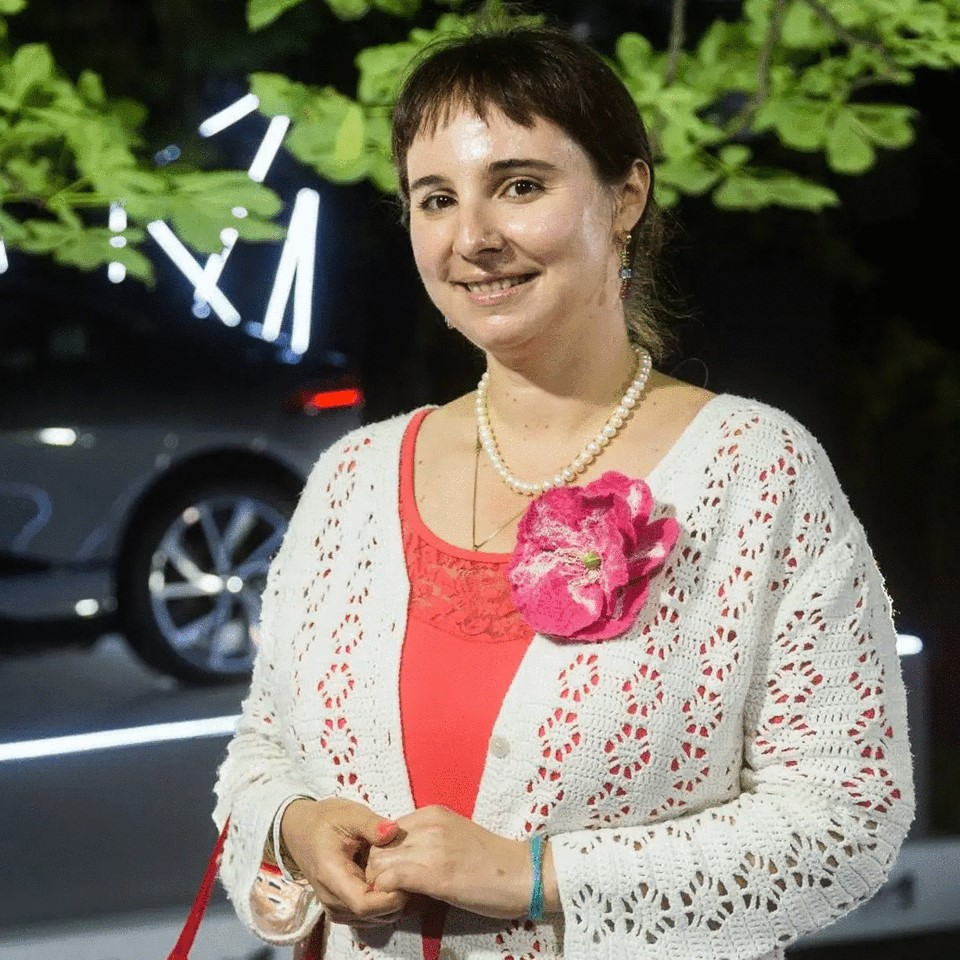
- portrait by Олександр Зубко, 2022
- Born: August 27, 1981 (age 45); Kyiv, Ukraine
- Education: Kyiv Polytechnic Institute (2004)
- Occupations: Journalist, poet, writer
- Years active: 2006–present

Margarita Yakovleva (Ukrainian: Маргарита Яковлєва; born August 27, 1981) is a Ukrainian journalist, poet and writer. The Member of the International Federation of Journalists since 2007. The author of articles in economics and finance field. Since September 2013 she is working with Forbes Ukraine.

== Biography ==
Margarita Ormotsadze was born in Kyiv. in the family of engineers. She is the native Kyivan in the six generation. The secondary education received in school № 24 (1998). Ormotsadze graduated as engineer of computer sciences from the Kyiv Polytechnic Institute. Since 2006 she is working as business journalist. She was an editor and journalist in the newspapers and journals as The Ukrainian Week, Fokus, DELO.

== Creative activity ==
Margarita writes poetry since 5 years old. She has been publishing as a poet since 1996. Now published four books, including "Far. Nigh" (Kyiv, 2006), "Grand travel" (Donetsk, 2011). Her novels are dedicated to the travels and to the Middle East and Western European mystical traditions.,

She is a photo-artist. Her expositions and photo-projects were shown in the annual multidisciplinary international festival of contemporary art and cinema Gogolfest

== Awards ==
- Certificate of honor of the Ministry of Justice of Ukraine, 2004
- International Contest among business mass media journalists of Russia and Ukraine – PRESSzvanie Business Circles Prize 2008. Best journalist in Insurance (first place), Best journalist in Business and society (third place), 2009
- Honorary diploma of the State Tax Service of Ukraine, 2010
- PRESSzvanie Business Circles Prize-2011, Best journalist in Telecommunications and IT (third place), 2012
