= Ukrainian National Army =

Ukrainian Nazi Germany–aligned military unit

- Symbol of the Ukrainian National Army
- Active: 17 March / 15 April 1945 – 7 May 1945
- Country: Germany
- Allegiance: Germany; Ukrainian National Committee; Government of UPR in exile
- Type: Infantry
- Size: 50,000
- Engagements: World War II; Battle of Berlin; Battle of Bautzen (1945); Austrian campaign; Vienna offensive; World War II in Yugoslavia; World War II in the Slovene Lands

Commanders
- Notable commanders: Pavlo Shandruk

The Ukrainian National Army (Ukrainian: Українська національна армія, romanized: Ukrainska natsionalna armiia, abbreviated УНА, UNA) was a World War II Ukrainian military group, created on March 17, 1945, in the town of Weimar, Nazi Germany, and subordinate to Ukrainian National Committee.

== History ==
The army, formed on April 15, 1945, and commanded by General Pavlo Shandruk, consisted of the following units:

- 1st Galicia Division (formerly, 14th Waffen Grenadier Division of the SS (1st Galician), however, there is no proof to demonstrate that the renaming was done formally)
- 2nd Division, organized into two brigades – the Free Ukraine Anti-Tank Brigade (Вільна Україна) and a second brigade – from remnants of the Ukrainian Liberation Army and other Ukrainian units, led by General Petro Dyachenko;
- B Group (50 men) led by General Taras Bulba-Borovets;
- Ukrainian Free Cossacks led by Colonel Tereshchenko;
- 1st Reserve Brigade led by Colonel Hudyma;
- 2nd Reserve Brigade led by Colonel Malets.

Plans were made regarding the inclusion of the Ukrainian Liberation Army, Kuban Cossacks and Georgian military divisions.

The primary purpose of creation of the Ukrainian National Army was to integrate all the Ukrainian units fighting the Soviets under a single command. The intended size of the army, encompassing all the Ukrainian units subordinate to Oberkommando des Heeres was 220,000. However within the two months left till the end of the war, Shandruk was able to gather about 50,000 soldiers.

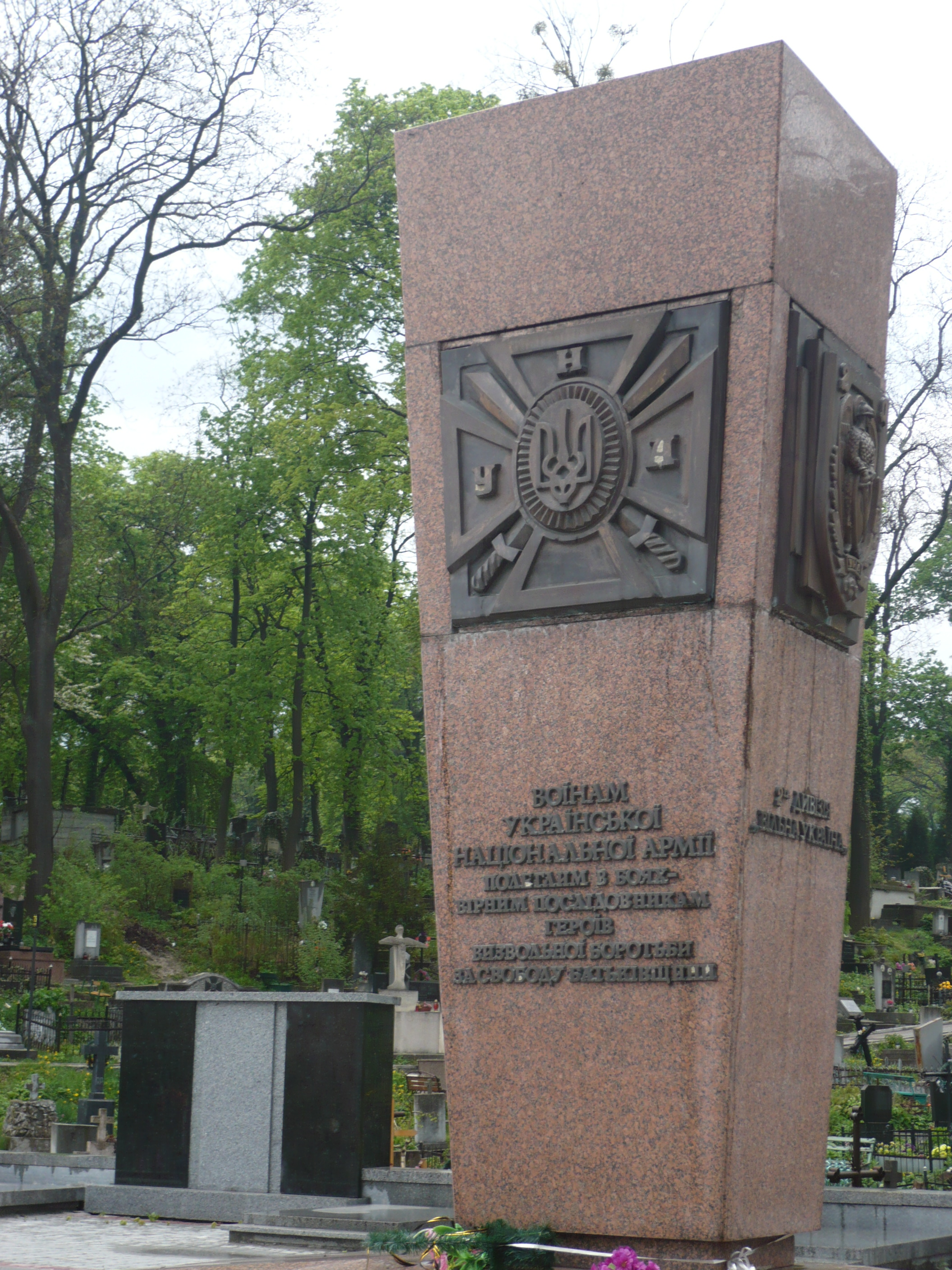
The Monument for the UNA in Lychakiv Cemetery, Lviv, Ukraine

In reality, Shandruk was able to command only the 1st Division and elements of the 2nd Division. On May 7, under his influence, the division – located in Western Austria by this time, after slowly moving from Slovenia (February 1945) – withdrew further from Red Army forces. The Army now split into several groups, with one heading towards the Italian border and surrendering to the British Army's 15th Army Group, while others moved toward the German and Swiss borders and surrendered to the US Army's 6th Army Group. The UNA soldiers were interned in Northern Italy, in the area controlled by Polish II Corps forces. After the capitulation, Shandruk asked for a meeting with Polish general Władysław Anders in London, and asked him to protect the army against the deportation to Soviet Union. Despite the Soviet pressure, Anders managed to protect Ukrainian soldiers as the former citizens of the Second Republic of Poland. Shandruk and the bulk of his forces managed to remain in the West, with many of the former UNA soldiers joining the French Foreign Legion.

Other groups, splintered, either surrendered to the Soviet or the Western Allies, facing repatriation, with several hundred interned in Switzerland.

The UNA had a bad relationship with general Andrey Vlasov's Russian Liberation Army and was never subordinated to it.
