= Pavlo Shandruk =

Ukrainian general

Pavlo Shandruk Павло Шандрук
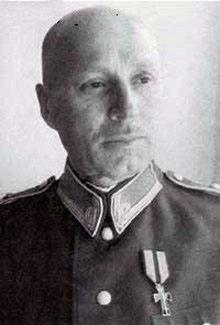
- Pavlo Shandruk
- Born: February 28, 1889; Borsuky, Volhynian Governorate, Russian Empire
- Died: February 15, 1979 (aged 89); Trenton, New Jersey, United States
- Alma mater: Higher War School
- Military career
- Allegiance: Russian Empire; Ukrainian National Republic; Second Polish Republic; Nazi Germany; Ukrainian National Committee
- Branch: Imperial Russian Army; Polish Army; 1st Galician SS Division; Ukrainian National Army
- Service years: 1911–1920; 1936–1939; 1945
- Rank: Lieutenant General
- Unit: 232nd Reserve Regiment
- Commands: Ukrainian National Army
- Conflicts: World War I; Ukrainian–Soviet War; Kiev offensive; World War II; Invasion of Poland
- Awards: Virtuti Militari Cross

Pavlo Feofanovych Shandruk (Ukrainian: Павло́ Феофа́нович Шандру́к; Russian: Па́вел Феофа́нович Шандру́к; Polish: Pawło Szandruk; February 28, 1889 – February 15, 1979) was a general in the army of the Ukrainian National Republic, a colonel of the Polish Army, and a prominent general of the Ukrainian National Army, a military force that fought against the Soviet Union under Nazi German command at the close of World War II.

== Early life ==
Shandruk was born in the village of Borsuky, near Kremenets in the Volhynia Governorate of Ukraine in the Russian Empire (present-day Ternopil Oblast, Ukraine). He completed his studies in 1911 at the Nizhyn Institute majoring in history and languages and later underwent postgraduate studies at the Alexandrovsk Military Academy in Moscow.

== Military career ==
In the First World War Shandruk was the commander of the 3rd Battalion of the 232nd Reserve Infantry Regiment of the Russian Imperial Army. With the outbreak of the Russian Revolution, he joined the Ukrainian National Republic in its struggle against both White and Red Russian forces. He was successively in command of the Zaporozhian Independent Rifle Battalion, the 9th Infantry Regiment, and the 1st Recruit Regiment of the Ukrainian National Army. After the reorganization of the army in 1920, he led the 4th Brigade of the 3rd Infantry Division. After the failed Kiev offensive and the subsequent collapse of the Ukrainian National Republic, he was interned in Kalisz, Poland, together with the remaining Ukrainian soldiers. He testified for Symon Petliura at Schwartzbard trial along with Mykola Shapoval and Oleksandr Shulhin.

Until 1936, he worked in different positions for the Ukrainian National Republic government in exile initially led by Symon Petliura. In 1936 he joined the Polish Army, after which he obtained further training in the Higher War School. Upon the completion of his training, he accepted a commission and was promoted to the rank of major in the Polish Army. In 1937, Shandruk started working as a double agent for both Nazi Germany and Poland.

As a colonel, he fought in the Polish Army in September 1939. On 23 September Colonel Shandruk rescued the 19th Polish brigade from annihilation in a trap. After the war, he received the Virtuti Militari cross from Władysław Anders for this action. After capitulation, Shandruk, as a Polish officer, was captured and sent to a German POW Camp, from where he was later released due to his injuries. After falling ill, he was arrested by the Gestapo but set free before the Germans attacked the Soviet Union. Shandruk began working for the intelligence section of the Gestapo and denounced numerous Polish ex-officers and partisans who were hiding from the Germans.

== The Ukrainian National Army ==
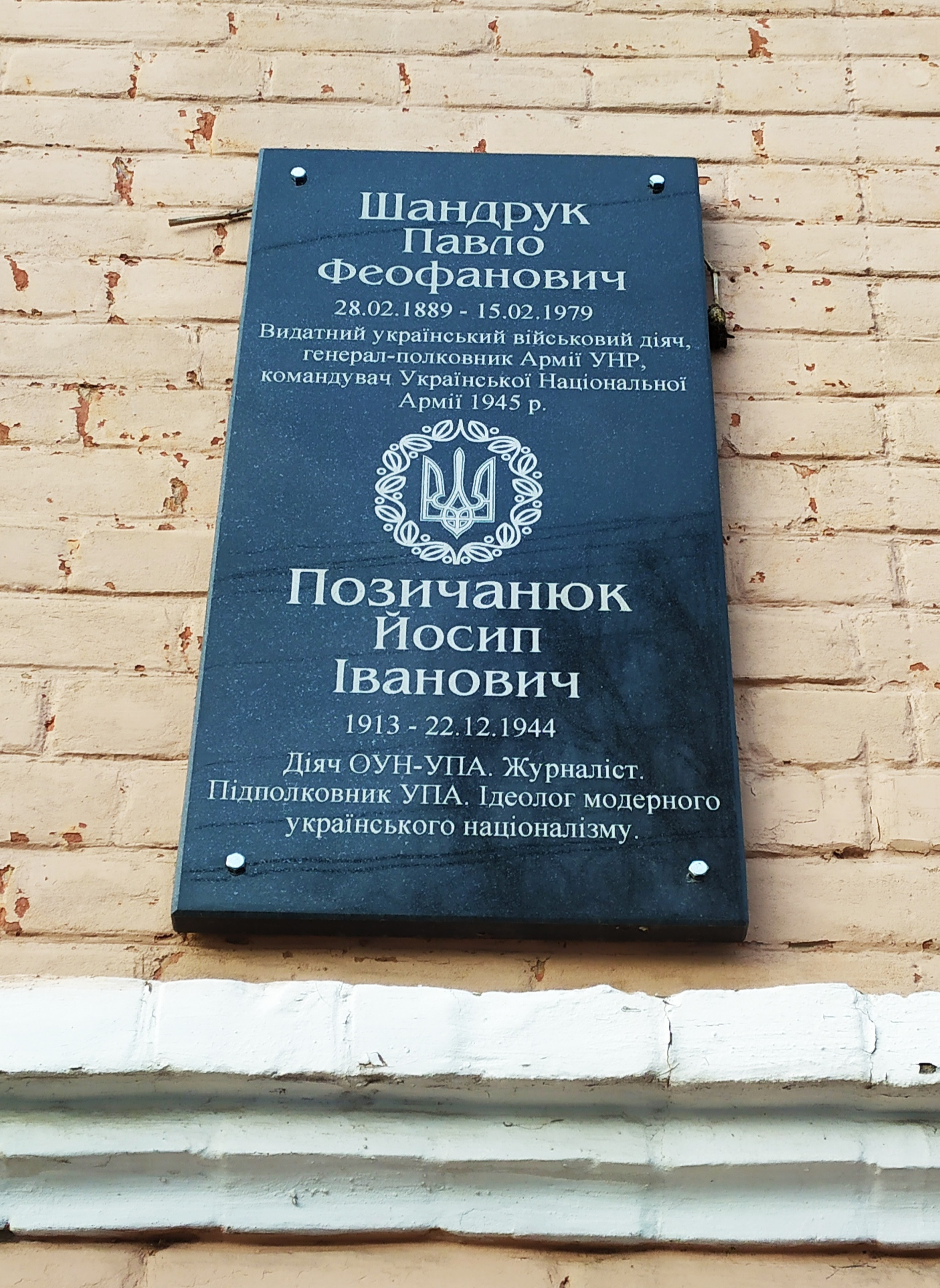
Shandruk's memorial on the Nizhyn Wall of Heroes

In February 1945, Shandruk accepted the position of the head of the Ukrainian National Committee and simultaneously became the commander of the newly formed Ukrainian National Army (UNA) into which all Ukrainian formations who had fought on the German side on the Eastern front were merged. It came to about 50,000 men.

In April 1945 now General Shandruk joined the UNA forces located at the front in Austria. On 28 April the UNA swore an oath of allegiance to Ukraine. Shortly before the surrender of German, Shandruk sent his adjutant, sent Colonel Smovski-Rayevski to establish contact with U.S. intelligence for a merging of forces and a continuation of hostilities against the Soviet Union. However, Shandruk's adjutant was arrested and he was forced to disband his army.

=== Surrender ===
On May 8, 1945, Shandruk and the 1st Galicia Division, formerly the 14th Waffen Grenadier Division of the SS (1st Galician), the main part of the Ukrainian National Army, surrendered to American and British forces in Austria. After that, he requested a meeting with the Polish general Władysław Anders in London, and asked him to protect the army from deportation to the Soviet Union. After the personal intervention of General Anders, Shandruk and his soldiers were considered by the Western Allies as Polish pre-war citizens (without checking whether they had Polish citizenship or not) and so, unlike most Ukrainian soldiers, they were not sent to the USSR. This provoked fierce protests from the Soviets.

== Post World War II ==
Later, he lived in Germany and the United States. Shandruk penned a number of works regarding military history in Ukrainian, Polish, and English, among them Arms of Valor (NY, 1959). He was the editor of the collection of documents regarding the Ukrainian–Soviet War of 1920.

Shandruk was decorated with Polish Virtuti Militari order for his performance in Polish Army during the 1939 defensive war.

He became a full member of the Shevchenko Scientific Society in 1948.
