= Lanivtsi Raion =

Former subdivision of Ternopil Oblast, Ukraine

Lanivtsi Raion Лановецький район
- Raion
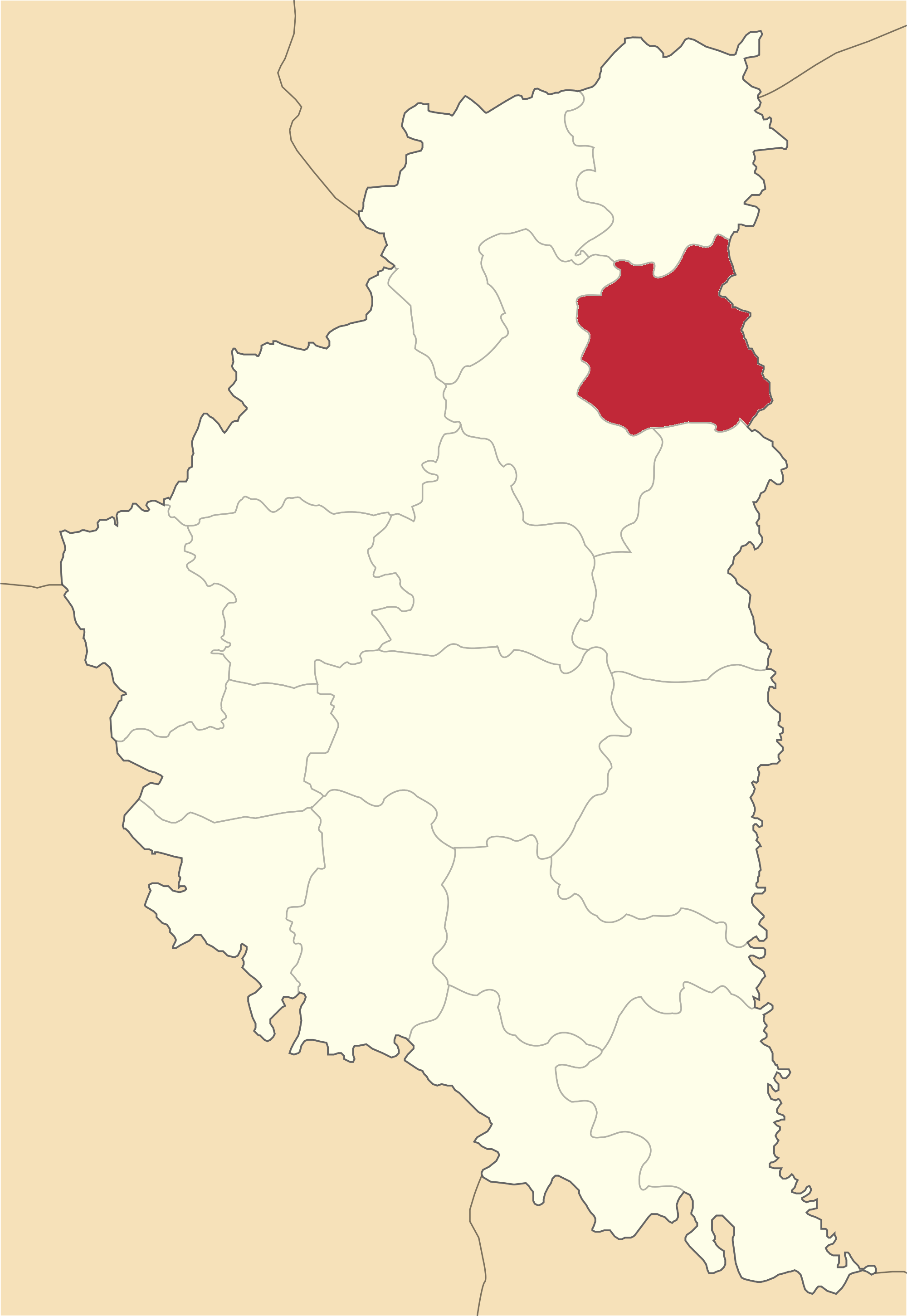
- Coordinates: 49°50′N 26°01′E
- Country: Ukraine
- Oblast: Ternopil Oblast
- Established: 1939
- Disestablished: 18 July 2020
- Admin. center: Lanivtsi
- Subdivisions: List: — city councils; — settlement councils; — rural councils; Number of localities: — cities; — urban-type settlements; 52 — villages; — rural settlements

Area
  - Total: 632 km^{2} (244 sq mi)

Population (2020)
  - Total: 28,410
  - Density: 45.0/km^{2} (116/sq mi)
- Time zone: UTC+02:00 (EET)
  - Summer (DST): UTC+03:00 (EEST)
- Area code: 380-3549

Lanivtsi Raion (Ukrainian: Лановецький район) was a raion (district) in Ternopil Oblast in western Ukraine. Its administrative center was Lanivtsi. The raion was abolished on 18 July 2020 as part of the administrative reform of Ukraine, which reduced the number of raions of Ternopil Oblast to three. The area of Lanivtsi Raion was merged into Kremenets Raion. The last estimate of the raion population was 28,410 (2020 est.).

== Subdivisions ==
At the time of disestablishment, the raion consisted of two hromadas:

- Borsuky rural hromada with the administration in the selo of Borsuky;
- Lanivtsi urban hromada with the administration in Lanivtsi.

== Villages in Raion ==
- Bilozirka (population 1,102)
- Moskalivka (population 582)

== See also ==
- Subdivisions of Ukraine
