= Ukrainization of Russian Army units =

1917 process to create Ukrainian People's Army

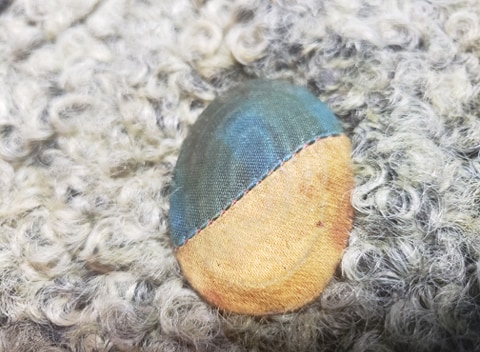
Cockade of the Ukrainianized units of the former Russian Imperial Army

The Ukrainization of Russian Army units was the process of forming Ukrainian military formations within the Russian Army (formerly the Imperial Russian Army) with the aim of further creating Ukrainian People's Army on their basis during the time of the Ukrainian Central Rada. The process lasted from March to the end of 1917 and was actually continued during the war against Bolsheviks and White movement. It became one of the key factors in the declaration of independence of the Ukrainian People's Republic (UPR).

Ukrainization was a success, as "In early December 1917, the number of soldiers of the Ukrainized Russian Army units reached about 600,000. Approximately 400,000 of them were on the territory of the UPR, of which almost 60,000 were in the 1st Ukrainian Corps of Pavlo Skoropadsky." However, by the end of December, a mere 27,000 soldiers remained under the command of the Central Rada, thus indicating a drop of almost 15 times in the size of the Ukrainian People's Army.

== Spring 1917 ==
=== February 1917 ===
In February 1917, the Tsarist autocracy was overthrown in the Russian Empire during the February Revolution, the Provisional Government came to power, and the Russian Republic was proclaimed. The entire former empire was engulfed in revolutionary chaos, full of desires for the establishment of a new and more just order and the resolution of painful national and social problems that had accumulated during the tsarist era.

The February Revolution's consequences did not bypass the Russian Imperial Army, in which at the time about 3.5 million Ukrainians served, whereas the army had a total strength of 9.6 million soldiers. On the Southwestern and Romanian fronts, Ukrainians made up 60–70% of the personnel.

=== March−April 1917 ===
==== Creation of the Central Rada (March 4, 1917) ====
At this crucial time, in order to unite Ukrainian national forces, a broadly representative public structure was created in Kyiv on 4 March [O.S. 17 March] 1917 from representatives of political, scientific, educational, student, cooperative, and other organizations - the Ukrainian Central Rada (UCR), the head of which was elected the outstanding historian Professor Mykhailo Hrushevsky and which advocated the democratization of public and political life, overcoming national and social problems, and granting Ukraine broad autonomy within the framework of a new, free Russia.

==== Creation of the Ukrainian Military Council (March 9, 1917) ====
Already on March 9 [O.S. March 22] in Kyiv, on the initiative of a lawyer and officer of the district court, Lieutenant Mykola Mikhnovsky, a council of Ukrainians, officers and soldiers of the local garrison was held, which decided to consider itself the Ukrainian Military Council and in this status to send an official appeal to the Provisional Government in Petrograd with a demand to grant autonomy to Ukraine.

==== Ukrainian Military Club (from mid-March) ====
A week later, a public and political organization, the Ukrainian Military Club "Hetman Pavlo Polubotok", was founded in Kyiv, which took into its own hands the organization of "its own national army, as its own powerful military force, without which it is impossible to even think about gaining full freedom for Ukraine," becoming in essence a kind of ideological and political center of this process. And the Ukrainian Military Organizational Committee, created at the same time, was to deal with the resolution of various current issues, and its activities were subject to the instructions of the Club. The Club was headed by Lieutenant Mikhnovsky, and the Committee was headed by Colonel M. Hlynsky.

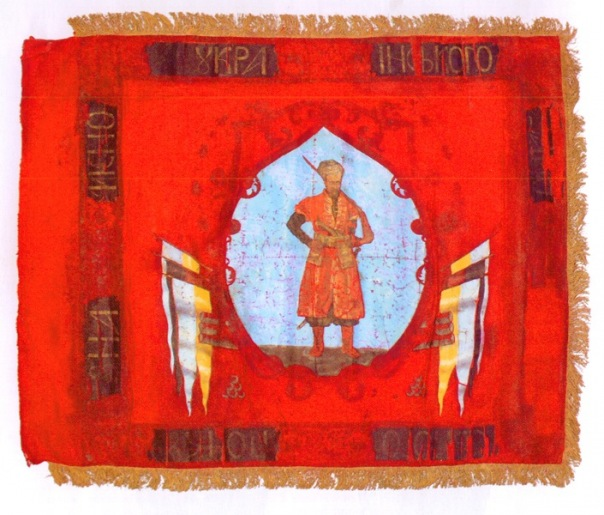
Flag of the Ukrainian Zaporozhian Regiment, formed in Moscow from Ukrainian soldiers of the local garrison

At the call of the Polubotkovites, the active creation of various organizations of Ukrainian soldiers began on all fronts and armies and in large rear garrisons. Thus, on April 7 [O.S. March 25], a 20,000-strong demonstration of Ukrainian soldiers of the capital's garrison took place in Petrograd, who took to the streets with national flags. On April 20 [O.S. April 7], a similar action took place in Moscow. It was organized by the local Ukrainian Military Club. In April, the Ukrainian Council was created in the army group called Western Front, headed by Symon Petliura, then the commissioner of the All-Russian Union of Zemstvos, who was engaged in supplying the army. The Ukrainian Council, headed by Lieutenant O. Bolonsky, was created in the 12th Army, which held the front in the Riga area and which included about 120,000 Ukrainians. The geography of the Ukrainian national movement in the Russian army was expanding. Ukrainian military councils, communities, committees, societies, etc. operated on all fronts and in most rear garrisons; various demonstrations, veches, congresses, and rallies took place even in such remote regions from Ukraine as Finland, the Caucasus, the Black Sea coast of Turkey, Siberia, the Far East, and Manchuria.

==== April 1917 − Creation of the 1st Ukrainian Cossack Regiment ====
On May 1 [O.S. April 18], 1917, a “festival of the first flowers” took place on Syretsky Field in Kyiv, in which Ukrainian soldiers from the Russian units stationed in the city took part. It was here that about 3,000 soldiers from the Kyiv staging point declared themselves the 1st Ukrainian Cossack Regiment "Hetman Bohdan Khmelnytsky". Within a few days, the necessary organizational measures were taken and personnel, cannon, cavalry, machine gun and engineering units were formed; there were hopes that an entire division would soon be deployed on the basis of the unit. The regiment consisted of 16 hundreds and numbered 3,574 soldiers. Staff Captain D. Putnyk-Hrebenyuk was elected commander. However, the Russian command refused to recognize the regiment, accusing the Bogdanovites of trying to sit out in the rear and avoid participating in hostilities in this way. The commander of the Southwestern Front, General Aleksei Brusilov, threatened to disperse the "deserters" by force, but under the pressure of the revolutionary situation, he had to make concessions three days later, agreeing to the creation of a Ukrainian military unit on a volunteer basis, numbering 500 people.

== May–June 1917 ==
=== 1st All-Ukrainian Military Congress (May 18–21, 1917) ===
In order to unite and direct the powerful, but largely spontaneous patriotic movement of Ukrainians in the Russian army into a single stream, the 1st All-Ukrainian Military Congress was held in Kyiv on May 18–21 [O.S. May 5–8], 1917. It was attended by more than 700 delegates, representing almost 1 million servicemen. The delegates advocated the autonomy of Ukraine within the framework of federal Russia and the "immediate nationalization of the army on the national-territorial principle." In addition, they demanded that the Black Sea Fleet continue to be staffed exclusively by Ukrainians (at that time, about 65% of its personnel were Ukrainians), and that the Baltic Fleet be staffed with Ukrainians to command several warships. The congress raised the issue of introducing the Ukrainian language in the troops. It was to be used in national units, to print textbooks, military statutes, and other specialized literature, and to be taught in national military schools.

==== Creation of the Ukrainian General Military Committee ====
For the practical implementation of these requirements, the congress decided to establish the Ukrainian General Military Committee (UGVK) under the Central Rada, initially consisting of 18 members headed by Petliura. The first day of the UGVK's work, May 22 [O.S. May 9], was later recognized as the holiday of the revival of the Ukrainian army. The Committee's activities were aimed at creating new Ukrainian military units, even despite the ban of the Russian command. First of all, the already existing 1st Regiment "Bohdan Khmelnytsky" was expanded, the number of which increased to 3,200 soldiers. It consisted of three infantry kurins of four hundreds each, and also had separate machine-gun, cavalry, communications and economic hundreds. The new commander of the regiment was Yuriy Kapkan, a delegate to the 1st All-Ukrainian Military Congress from Ukrainian soldiers of the Saratov garrison. At the same time, without the consent of the Russian authorities, the creation of new volunteer (volunteer) Ukrainian units began. Thus, in particular, the following were created:

- 2nd Infantry Regiment "Hetman Pavel Polubotok" (Kyiv);
- Infantry Regiment "Hetman Petro Doroshenko" (Chernihiv);
- Infantry Regiment "Hetman Petro Doroshenko" (Simferopol);
- Infantry Regiment "Taras Shevchenko" (Khmilnyk);
- Infantry Regiment "Hetman Petro Sahaidachny" (Zhytomyr);
- Regiment "Ivan Gonta" (Uman);
- Reserve Ukrainian Regiment (Moscow);
- 2nd Ukrainian Reserve Regiment (Kharkiv);
- Kurin "Taras Shevchenko" (Daugavpils, now Latvia)

=== 2nd All-Ukrainian Military Congress (June 18–23, 1917) ===
The openly hostile attitude towards the Ukrainian movement on the part of the Provisional Government and the military leadership prompted the UGVK to convene the 2nd All-Ukrainian Military Congress, which, despite the ban of Petrograd, began its work on June 18 [O.S. June 5], 1917. This time, 2,500 delegates had already arrived in Kyiv, representing about 2 million Ukrainian soldiers. They put forward a demand to the Central Rada to stop their inaction and "immediately proceed… to the actual implementation of the foundations of the autonomous system, as the only way to save Ukraine and all of Russia from disorder and destruction." Then, having heard the UGVK report, the delegates instructed it to develop a detailed plan for the Ukrainization of the army as soon as possible and approved the charter of the Ukrainian military communities. The congress also obliged all Ukrainian military organizations and individual Ukrainian soldiers to strictly carry out the orders of the UGVK, which, at the suggestion of Petliura, was supplemented by 10 new members. At the same time, a Provisional Military Council was elected consisting of 130 people, who became members of the Central Rada.

The firm position of the military finally forced Ukrainian politicians to dare to declare autonomy. On June 23 [O.S. June 10], 1917, on the last day of the 2nd All-Ukrainian Military Congress, the Central Rada adopted its First Universal, which announced that "we ourselves will create our life." On June 28 [O.S. June 15], the Ukrainian Central Rada formed its executive body, a de facto autonomous government - the General Secretariat headed by Volodymyr Vynnychenko. Among other departments, the General Secretariat for Military Affairs was also created under the leadership of Symon Petliura, chairman of the Ukrainian General Military Committee.

== July 1917 ==
The proclamation of Ukrainian autonomy and the emergence of its own government coincided with the final stage of preparation for the offensive operation of the Russian Southwestern Front (the so-called "Kerensky offensive"), which, in turn, was to become a key part of the general strategic offensive of the Russian troops along the entire front line from the Baltic to the Black Sea. However, despite the first quite significant successes, due to a sharp drop in the level of discipline of the soldiers, who refused to carry out the orders of their commanders and held mass rallies, this offensive turned into a complete disaster and the complete loss of the previously occupied Eastern Galicia.

In the midst of the fighting, a delegation of ministers of the Provisional Government arrived in Kyiv, begging the Central Rada not to "break up the common front" through mass and arbitrary Ukrainization, proposing instead, under certain conditions, to recognize the UCR as its representative body, and the General Secretariat of Ukraine as its executive body in the region. Seeking to gain legitimacy from the Petrograd government, the Rada leaders decided to compromise and in fact refused to lead the process of Ukrainization of the army, which was rapidly gaining momentum. As a result of the negotiations, on July 16 [O.S. July 3], the UCR published the Second Universal. This, in particular, stated:

As for the manning of military units, for this purpose the Central Rada will have its representatives in the office of the Minister of War, at the General Staff and the Supreme Commander-in-Chief, who will participate in the matters of manning individual units exclusively with Ukrainians, since such manning, according to the definition of the Minister of War, will be technically possible without violating the combat capability of the army.

In other words, the Ukrainian Central Democratic Republic completely handed over the matter of forming Ukrainian units to the Russians.

=== Polubotkivtsi uprising (July 4–5, 1917) ===
The Second Universal caused indignation among the personnel of the 2nd Ukrainian Regiment "Hetman P. Polubotok", stationed in Kyiv, whose radical soldiers raised the armed Polubotkivtsi uprising on the night of July 17–18 [O.S. July 4–5]. In their response, they wrote:

We, Ukrainian Cossacks, do not want to have freedom only on paper, or half freedom. After the proclamation of the first Universal (we do not recognize the second), we begin to restore order in Ukraine. To this end, we will remove all Russians and renegades who hinder the work of Ukrainians from their posts by force, without taking into account the Russian Government.

However, the uprising was unsuccessful. Mostly through negotiations, but sometimes by force, the activists of the Ukrainian Central Rada and the UGVK, with the help of the headquarters of the Kyiv Military District, returned the rebels to the barracks two days later, and then very quickly sent them under escort to the Romanian front. By order of Volodymyr Vynnychenko, the arrested Mykola Mikhnovsky, whom the authorities considered the main initiator of the riots, was also sent under escort along with the Polubotkivtsy.

It was during the Polubotkivtsi's uprising that several trains of recruits arrived at the Kyiv railway station, demanding that they be sent to the front not to replenish various Russian units, but only as a separate Ukrainian military unit – the 3rd Ukrainian Cossack Regiment "Mykhailo Hrushevsky". In order not to provoke possible unrest at a critical time, their demand was met.

=== Late July 1917 ===
Following this, on August 8 [O.S. July 26], by order of the district headquarters, the 1st Ukrainian Cossack Regiment "Hetman B. Khmelnytskyi" also set off for the Southwestern Front. After the recent performance of the Polubotkivtsi, neither the Russian authorities nor Ukrainian politicians had confidence in the Ukrainian military units, so they sought to quickly expel the regiment from Kyiv.

At the Post-Volynskyi station (today Kyiv-Volynskyi), the Bogdanovtsi echelon was fired upon with machine guns by Russian soldiers of the 2nd Life Guards Cuirassier and 17th Don Cossack Regiments. When the train stopped, the cuirassiers, led by their officers, began to beat and drag the unarmed Bogdanovtsi out of the carriages, brutally cursing and threatening: "We will show you autonomy!"

At the same time, all the foremen of the 2nd Kurin were arrested and sent back to Kyiv for trial. As a result of the treacherous and treacherous attack, according to official information, 16 Ukrainian soldiers were killed and 30 more were wounded. However, according to the testimony of the Bogdanovites themselves, their losses were much greater - about 100 people died during the shelling and about fifty more were shot on the spot. The killers managed to bury the bodies of these people before the arrival of the investigative commission, so they did not get into the official statistics. The Central Rada unsuccessfully tried to achieve punishment for the criminals. The funeral of the Bogdanovites turned into a large national manifestation, in which the entire nationally conscious Ukrainian population of Kyiv took part. These were the first victims of the then undeclared war of Russia against Ukraine.

After the Bogdanovites went to the front, in their barracks, from those soldiers who for various reasons remained in place, the formation of the 1st Ukrainian Reserve Regiment began, which was soon awarded the honorary name of Hetman Petro Doroshenko. This regiment was the only Ukrainian military unit in Kyiv for a long time.

== Ukrainization of units ==
In the last battles at the front, the Russian divisions proved to be completely unreliable. Demoralized and engulfed in pacifist propaganda, the soldiers did not want to fight, constantly rallied, and brutally dealt with their commanders. Against the backdrop of the deepening degradation of the army, the units manned on the national-territorial principle looked much better, were more motivated, disciplined, manageable, and therefore more combat-ready. This convinced the Russian command to resort to "nationalization", hoping that this would save the army from general decay and allow it to continue the war. Among other measures, the Supreme Command Headquarters allowed Ukrainization, that is, the allocation of Ukrainian soldiers, soldiers, and officers into separate national units and formations. However, Ukrainization took place exclusively on orders and under the control of the Russian authorities, since on August 17 [O.S. August 4], the Provisional Government, by its instruction, liquidated the separate military department within the Ukrainian autonomous government, the Ukrainian General Military Committee.

=== Southwestern Front ===
The first to be designated for Ukrainization was the Southwestern Front's 7th Army's 34th Army Corps, led by General Pavlo Skoropadsky, great-grandson of Hetman Ivan Skoropadsky. By order of the front commander, General Lavr Kornilov, on July 31 [O.S. July 18], he began the appropriate reorganization of his unit, which was removed from the front for this purpose and transferred to the area of the town of Medzhybizh in Podolia. All Russians were to be sent to the neighboring 41st Army Corps, and Ukrainian soldiers transferred from other units were to come in their place. However, General Pavlo Skoropadsky kept all the "good" Russians, officers and rank-and-file soldiers. As he himself later admitted, "this decision of mine caused me a lot of trouble," because the Russian minority constantly provoked internal conflicts and sabotaged the execution of orders from the Ukrainian authorities. With the beginning of Ukrainization, the 34th Corps was called the 1st Ukrainian, and its 104th and 153rd Divisions were called the 1st and 2nd Ukrainian, respectively. They were commanded by Generals Yakiv Handziuk and Viktor Klymenko. By the end of October, the reorganization was generally completed and the corps was ready to be sent to the front. At that time, it had about 60,000 soldiers.

On the Southwestern Front, the 11th Army's 6th Army Corps was also subject to Ukrainization. However, this process took place here somewhat differently. The Russians remained in place, and all Ukrainian soldiers in September 1917 were allocated to the new 51st Army Corps, which was soon renamed the 2nd Sich Zaporizhzhia. For reorganization, the unit was planned to be removed from the front and transferred to the Letychiv area, but due to the lack of fresh soldiers, there was no one to replace it, so the Ukrainization of the unit took place not in the rear, but directly in combat positions. At the end of November, General Heorhiy Mandryka was appointed as commander of the corps. The 4th Ukrainian Division was to be commanded by General Oleksander Osetsky, while the 5th by General Oleksandr Poggio.

Also on the Southwestern Front, the 9th Cavalry Division was Ukrainized, which became known as the 3rd Serdyutskaya Cavalry. The 1st Republican Ukrainian Infantry Regiment, organized by Colonel Petro Bolbochan, appeared in the 5th Army Corps; in the 102nd Infantry Division, the Ukrainians formed a separate death Kurin; in the 129th Infantry Division, two regiments and two gun batteries were Ukrainized; in the 7th Cavalry Division, a cavalry regiment. In addition, the 32nd and 41st Army Corps were to be Ukrainized, but due to strong Bolshevik agitation, this was never done.

=== Northern Front ===
Ukrainization also took place on other fronts. On the Northern Front, Ukrainian soldiers were concentrated in the 21st Army Corps, which became entirely Ukrainian. In the 1st Cavalry Corps, the 14th Cavalry Division was allocated for Ukrainization. In addition, the "Hetman Ivan Mazepa" Regiment appeared in the 4th Cavalry Division.

=== Western Front ===
On the Western Front, where there were relatively few Ukrainians, they were gathered in the 9th Army Corps and the 16th Corps's 45th Infantry Division. In the Grenadier Corps, Ukrainians formed the Kurin "Severyn Nalyvaiko", in the 24th Army Corps - the Regiment "Taras Shevchenko", in the 129th Infantry Division one regiment was Ukrainized. The "Kost Hordiienko" Cavalry Regiment, one of the most famous Ukrainian military units of the Ukrainian War of Independence (1917–1921), was formed from the Ukrainians of the 3rd Siberian Army Corps and the 7th Turkestan Division.

=== Romanian Front ===
On the Romanian Front, the 10th, 11th, 26th, and 40th Army Corps, the 4th Rifle, 10th, and 12th Cavalry Divisions were Ukrainized.

=== Caucasus Front ===
On the Caucasus Front, the 5th Caucasian Army Corps was to become Ukrainian.

Thus, the “Ukrainization of the bayonet,” as they called it at the time, gradually gained wider and wider scope. To a greater or lesser extent, it encompassed 16 army corps, 6 infantry and 6 cavalry divisions at the front; in the rear — 50 reserve regiments, technical units and a number of educational institutions, including two Kyiv, Vilnius (moved to Poltava during the war), Chuhuiv military, Yelizavetgrad cavalry and Sergiyev artillery (in Odesa) schools.

== November 1917 ==
=== Bolshevik October Coup ===
On 7 November 1917 [O.S. 25 October], the Bolsheviks in Petrograd carried out a coup d'état, overthrew the Provisional Government, proclaimed Soviet Russia as officially a republic of Soviets of Workers', Soldiers' and Peasants' Deputies, and formed a new government, the Council of People's Commissars, headed by Vladimir Lenin. The Ukrainian authorities reacted negatively to these events. On 9 November [O.S. 27 October], the General Secretariat of Ukraine issued an appeal in which it stated that "the bloody events threaten to destroy the achievements of the revolution," and therefore it would "resolutely fight all attempts to support this uprising in Ukraine."

However, the Bolsheviks, who had about 6,000 of their armed supporters in Kyiv, did not pay attention to this warning. Already on 11 November [O.S. 29 October], they tried to seize power by force in the Kiev Bolshevik Uprising, but were quickly defeated in clashes with Russian military units that still remained loyal to the overthrown Provisional Government. However, the Russians did not manage to gain a foothold in the city either.

=== 3rd All-Ukrainian Military Congress ===
At the call of the Central Rada, having learned about the Bolshevik uprising, three Ukrainian Cossack regiments quickly arrived in Kyiv from the front - those named after B. Khmelnytsky, P. Polubotka and M. Hrushevsky. In addition, at the crucial moment, the 1st St. George Infantry Reserve Regiment, numbering almost 1,000 soldiers (90% of whom were Ukrainians), went over to the side of the Central Rada, which, having removed all the Russians, declared itself the 4th Serdyutsky Regiment "Colonel Ivan Bohun". Finally, the 3rd All-Ukrainian Military Congress was taking place in Kyiv at that time, at which there were about 2,500 delegates. Given the seriousness of the situation, they formed the 1st Ukrainian Regiment of the Guard of the Revolution, led by Kapkan. Thus, the forces of the Central Rada grew rapidly. Seeing their advantage, the Russians, who decided to continue the fight against the Bolsheviks, left the city without a fight and went to the Don. Kyiv came completely under the control of the Ukrainian authorities.

Having suppressed the Bolsheviks' uprising and ousted the Russians, the delegates of the 3rd All-Ukrainian Military Congress returned to work. They expressed their full confidence in the Central Rada, but demanded that it "immediately proclaim the complete independence of Ukraine and begin the creation of the Ukrainian Army." In military matters, the congress demanded that the Ukrainian General Military Committee seek the immediate separation of all Ukrainians at the front into separate units, the complete Ukrainization of all garrisons on the territory of Ukraine, the appointment of its commissars to all Ukrainized divisions, and the creation of Ukrainian units in all branches of the army.

The decisions of the congress prompted the Central Rada to promulgate the Third Universal on November 20 [O.S. November 7], which proclaimed the Ukrainian People's Republic (UNR), which included 9 provinces: Volhynia, Podolia, Kyiv, Chernihiv, Poltava, Kharkiv, Kherson, Katerynoslav and Taurida (excluding Crimea). All power in these territories belonged only to the Central Rada and the General Secretariat. However, the document did not mention independence. The universal stated:

Without separating from the Russian Republic and preserving its unity, we will stand firmly on our land, so that with our forces we can help all of Russia, so that the entire Russian Republic may become a federation of equal and free peoples.

Thus, despite the proclamation of the UNR, the leaders of the Central Rada continued to consider Ukraine as an autonomous unit within Russia, albeit a federal, democratic, non-Bolshevik one.

== December 1917 ==
After the Third Universal, relations between the Central Rada and Lenin's Council of People's Commissars began to rapidly deteriorate. Conflict was inevitable. Under these conditions, intensive work began in Kyiv aimed at creating its own armed forces capable of protecting the newly proclaimed republic from the encroachments of the Bolshevik political usurpers. To this end, in November 1917, the Ukrainian General Military Committee was reorganized into the General Secretariat for Military Affairs, headed by Symon Petliura, and his assistant - Volodymyr Kedrowsky. This was not just a change in the name of the institution. For the military department, this meant an increase in competence, an expansion of the scope of responsibilities, and an increase in legal status to the level of other government secretariats. One of Petliura's first steps in this position was the establishment of the Ukrainian General Military Staff, headed by General Boris Bobrovsky, and his assistants - General Vasyl Pashchenko and Lieutenant Colonel Oleksandr Slyvinsky. Thus, the main bodies of the central military administration of the UNR were established.

=== Creation of the Ukrainian Front (December 6, 1917) ===
On December 6 [O.S. November 23], 1917, Petliura issued an order to unite the troops of the Southwestern and Romanian fronts into a new Ukrainian Front, which would be subordinate not to the Russian Bolshevik, but to the Ukrainian authorities. At Petliura's insistence, General Dmitry Shcherbachev, who had previously headed the Romanian front, was appointed commander of the front. The next step was Petliura's order to demobilize all Russian soldiers of the Ukrainian front, as well as all officers who did not want to serve the Central Rada. He also called for the disarmament of the Bolshevik units, but in this matter he met with a categorical refusal from Volodymyr Vynnychenko, who called for fighting the Bolsheviks exclusively by ideological methods.

==== Sich Riflemen ====
The creation of new military units also continued. In November 1917, the Sich Riflemen Halych-Bukovyna Kurin began to be formed in Kyiv from captured soldiers of the Austro-Hungarian army of Ukrainian nationality, as well as refugees and exiles from Western Ukrainian lands. It initially became part of the 1st Ukrainian Reserve Regiment "Hetman P. Doroshenko". The kurin's first commander was the Russian officer O. Lysenko. The organization of the unit proceeded quite quickly, so by the end of the year it already had 500 soldiers.

==== Serdyutsky Divisions ====
Also in November, the new, already Ukrainian commander of the Kyiv Military District, Colonel Viktor Pavlenko, at Petliura's suggestion, initiated the creation of two Serdyutsky Divisions, which he conceived as elite units stationed in the capital, an analogue of the Russian Guards. The name "Serdyutsky" was not chosen by chance - it was supposed to remind of the Serdyutsky regiments of Hetman Ivan Mazepa, who died defending Baturyn in 1708. The 1st Serdyutsk Division, led by Lieutenant Colonel Kapkan, included the infantry regiments B. Khmelnytsky, P. Polubotka, P. Doroshenko and I. Bohun, the T. Shevchenko kurin, the Death kurin, the 1st Cavalry Regiment "Free Ukraine" and the 1st Cannon Brigade "M. Hrushevsky". The 2nd Serdyutsk Division of General Oleksander Hrekov included the infantry regiments M. Hrushevsky, P. Sahaidachny, T. Shevchenko, and S. Nalyvayko. Soon the 3rd Serdyutskaya was declared by the Ukrainianized 9th Cavalry Division. Strict military discipline and unity of command were introduced in all divisions, the activities of electoral committees were prohibited, and a new, picturesque uniform was even introduced to attract soldiers.

Soon the Serdyuks justified the hopes placed on them. The 1st Division of Lieutenant Colonel Yu. Kapkan thwarted the Bolsheviks' plans to seize power in Kyiv for the second time. On the morning of December 12 [O.S. November 30], 1917, it disarmed the Bolshevik units of the Kyiv garrison and the workers' Red Guards detachments of the Arsenal factory and other enterprises - a total of almost 7,000 people who were about to raise an uprising against the Central Rada. The Russian soldiers were sent to Russia by railway trains under guard, and the Ukrainians were demobilized and sent home. At the same time, Bolshevik units were disarmed in 10 more cities of Ukraine. At the same time, the 1st Ukrainian Corps of General P. Skoropadsky, having taken control of the Zhmerynka - Koziatyn and Shepetivka - Vapnyarka - Koziatyn railways, successfully stopped the advance on Kyiv of the agitated soldiers of the 2nd Guards Corps under the command of Yevgenia Bosch. At the same time, the Russian soldiers were also sent under escort to Russia.

After two unsuccessful attempts to carry out a coup d'état and overthrow the power of the Central Rada, the Bolsheviks finally resorted to open aggression against the UNR, causing the Ukrainian–Soviet War.

=== Soviet telegram (December 17, 1917) ===
On December 17 [O.S. December 4], the UCR received a radiogram from Petrograd from the government of Soviet Russia (its author was Leon Trotsky, and Vladimir Lenin and Joseph Stalin edited the written text). It stated that the Council of People's Commissars confirms the right of all nations oppressed by the Russian autocracy to self-determination and secession from Russia, recognizes the Ukrainian People's Republic, its right to completely secede from Russia "immediately, without restrictions and unconditionally." However, this was followed by an accusation of the Central Rada that, “under the guise of national phrases, it is pursuing an ambiguous bourgeois policy, which has long been manifested in the Rada’s non-recognition of… Soviet power in Ukraine,” and therefore the Council of People's Commissars cannot consider it “an authoritative representative of the working and exploited masses of the Ukrainian Republic.” The authors of the telegram then made four ultimatum-like demands to the Central Rada:

1. to abandon the "disorganization of the common front", in other words, the Ukrainization of the troops and the creation of their own armed forces;
2. not to allow any military units heading to the Don, the Urals and other areas where anti-Bolshevik forces are concentrated without the permission of the Petrograd command;
3. to help the Red troops fight their enemies-"counter-revolutionaries", in particular with General Alexei Kaledin in the Don Region (Don Host Oblast).
4. to stop the disarmament of Bolshevik military units and detachments of the workers' Red Guards on their territory and to return weapons to all from whom they had been taken.

The last requirement directly concerned those 7,000 people who had been disarmed a few days earlier by the Serdyutsky. The People's Commissar gave the Central Rada 48 hours to respond positively. Otherwise, he would consider the Ukrainian Central Rada "in a state of open war against the Soviet government in Russia and Ukraine."

The telegram to the Council of People's Commissars arrived just as the All-Ukrainian Congress of Soviets was beginning its work in Kyiv, which the local Bolsheviks planned to use to remove the Central Rada from power. However, at the congress they found themselves in the minority and were unable to pass the decision they needed. Instead, the delegates supported the Ukrainian Central Rada and on December 20 [O.S. December 7] resolutely rejected Lenin's ultimatum.

==== Proclamation of the Ukrainian People's Republic of Soviets (December 25, 1917) ====
Then the Bolshevik faction in its entirety left Kyiv and moved to Kharkiv, where it organized its own All-Ukrainian Congress of Soviets, which on December 25 [O.S. December 12] proclaimed Ukrainian People's Republic of Soviets, recognized it as a federal part of Soviet Russia, and extended the validity of all Lenin's decrees to it. It is clear that the Petrograd Council of People's Commissars recognized the "Kharkiv" Soviet Ukraine as the true representative of the interests of the "proletariat" of the Ukrainian population and was ready to provide it with the necessary assistance in the fight against the "bourgeois" Central Rada.

Already on December 26 [O.S. December 13], the Russian Red troops, who had been concentrating in Kharkiv for a long time, supposedly for further movement to the Don to suppress the forces of General Kaledin, unexpectedly attacked the Lozova station, and two days later the city of Chuhuiv. On December 28 [O.S. December 15], a meeting of the General Secretariat of the UNR was held. The head of the government, V. Vynnychenko, did not believe in the reality of a real war and proposed first

“asking the Council of People’s Commissars whether it was fighting or not… demanding an end to hostilities in Ukraine, the withdrawal of Russian troops from Ukraine.”

In contrast, Petliura proposed immediately launching an offensive on Kharkiv, convincing that he had enough strength to take this stronghold of the Bolsheviks and protect the borders of the UNR. Three days earlier, he had already ordered the transfer of Ukrainian units to the east to take control of the Lozova, Synelnykove, Oleksandrivsk (now Zaporizhzhia), Yasynuvata and other important transport hubs. However, instead of fighting the enemy, the UNR government decided on December 31 [O.S. December 18] to dismiss the Secretary General of Military Affairs Petliura, a supporter of decisive action. The official wording was "for abuse of authority." The real reason was the personal hostility to Petliura of the head of government Vynnychenko, who envied his popularity in the troops, accused him of "Bonapartism", the desire to establish a military dictatorship and considered him the main culprit in the conflict with Lenin's Council of People's Commissars. He hoped that Petliura's resignation would avoid a large-scale war with Soviet Russia, which it did not and instead the Ukrainian–Soviet War still happened.

== January 1918 ==
With the removal of Petliura, his initiatives aimed at building regular armed forces were put to an end. Thus, Colonel V. Pavlenko, the commander of the Kyiv Military District, was dismissed from his post, and the Serdyutsky divisions created on his initiative were disbanded. On 6 January 1918 [O.S. 24 December 1917], due to disagreement with the policy of the Central Rada, the commander of the 1st Ukrainian Corps, General P. Skoropadskyi, also resigned. His departure led to a crisis of management and rapid disorganization of the previously disciplined unit, whose soldiers in January 1918 were subjected to a general wave of demobilization.

The new Secretary General of Military Affairs, Mykola Porsh, was completely unsuited to either the high position or the difficult military-political situation. He was catastrophically lacking in firmness and determination, and most importantly, in professional knowledge in the military field. He never managed to issue clear orders on the organization of the republic's defense. Instead, he was captivated by the idea of building a new Ukrainian army on a volunteer basis. He firmly believed that in this way he would be able to recruit a combat-ready army of at least 100,000 soldiers in two months.

Removed from office, Petliura took up the creation of a special volunteer department in Kyiv - the Haidamak Kosh of Sloboda Ukraine, with which he intended to independently go to Kharkiv (hence the choice of the name Sloboda Ukraine). The Kosh consisted of kurens of "black" and "red" Haidamaks, an ataman's hundred and a cannon divizion. The "black" Haidamaks were mainly enrolled by cadets from the 2nd Ukrainian Military School, and the "red" - by volunteer starshina. The total number of personnel of the department was approximately 300 soldiers, disciplined and motivated fighters for the independence of Ukraine.

=== Expanding Soviet occupation ===
While Vynnychenko could not understand whether Petrograd was at war with him, while Secretary General M. Porsh was considering his grandiose plans, both in scale and utopian, the Red troops gradually occupied more and more Ukrainian territory. On 8–9 January 1918 [O.S. 26–27 December 1917] they occupied Luhansk and Mariupol, on 10 January 1918 [O.S. 28 December 1917] they disarmed Ukrainian units in Kharkiv, on 11 January 1918 [O.S. 29 December 1917] they captured Katerynoslav, on January 15 [O.S. January 2] — Oleksandrivsk, Synelnykove, Kupiansk, on January 17 [O.S. January 4] Sumy, on January 19 [O.S. January 6] Poltava, on January 21 [O.S. January 9] Konotop.

The disorganized Ukrainian units, abandoned by political leaders to their fate at a crucial moment, put up weak, disorganized resistance, and some, such as in Chernihiv and Nizhyn, declared their neutrality and even began to openly play along with the Reds. Time and opportunities for an offensive against the enemy were lost. Hopes for the Ukrainianized units that were to arrive in Ukraine from different parts of the front also did not come true.

All these regiments, which were formed revolutionaryly, and which had neither a name nor a number, were only a random gathering of people, which disbanded immediately upon touching Ukrainian territory, because their slogan was - "home". This is how the Ukrainian regiment from Moscow disbanded, which went "to celebrate the liberation of Ukraine", and survived only one parade; this is how the regiment named after T. Shevchenko, which gathered against the will of the Bolsheviks from the reserve units of the guard in St. Petersburg, disappeared... It only managed to "restore order" in the warehouses in Pechersk and at the moment of the sharp struggle for Kyiv in 1917-1918, maintaining neutrality, disappeared, not even leaving in history the date when it disappeared.

— General Vsevolod Petriv

General Vsevolod Petriv had every right to make such a critical statement, because the K. Hordienko Cavalry Regiment he created on the Western Front was almost the only unit that not only arrived in Ukraine, but also immediately began to fight the enemy.

=== Demobilization of Ukrainian forces on January 17, 1918 ===
The enemy troops were getting closer and closer to Kyiv. However, in response to this, on January 17 [O.S. January 4], Secretary General M. Porsh issued orders for the immediate demobilization of Ukrainian regular units, the disbandment of the old army and the liquidation of officer ranks. Thus, before the enemy offensive, the UNR itself voluntarily liquidated the Ukrainianized units and put an end to its regular armed forces. They planned to replace them with a militia of conscious citizens. The leaders of the Central Rada and the leaders of the most influential Ukrainian parties (Social Democrats, Social-Revolutionaries, Socialist-Federalists) did not pay due attention to the organization of their own army, did not understand its important importance for the state. They considered the Ukrainian military movement only as one of the trump cards in the fight against the central Russian authorities to achieve their moderate demands. This is where the roots of the anti-militaristic course of the socialist leaders of the Central Rada lie, who actually refused to create an army. On this subject, V. Vynnychenko wrote:

We, the Social Democrats and all sincere democrats, do not need our own army, but the destruction of all standing armies.

— V. Vynnychenko

=== Fourth Universal on January 22, 1918 ===
Similar utopian ideas were soon enshrined in the Fourth Universal of the Central Rada, adopted on January 22 [O.S. January 9], 1918. This historical document, written by the same Vynnychenko, proclaimed the complete independence of the UNR, but at the same time it also said the following:

Disband the army altogether, and then instead of a standing army, establish a people's militia, so that our army serves to protect the working people, and not the desires of the ruling classes.

Such calls and official decisions dealt a major blow to the Ukrainian military movement, depriving it of the main goal of the struggle it was striving for at a difficult and dramatic moment — the building of a regular national army.

It must be said that the militia organization of the armed forces was not so harmful in itself (today the Swiss army is being built on this example), but the key to its successful implementation is a high level of patriotism and national consciousness of the population, ready to stand up to defend their state. So, the figures of the Central Rada turned out to be not up to par, demonstrating political immaturity and short-sightedness. They went with the flow, did not keep up with the rapid changes in the situation, did not lead the masses of the people, but acted under their influence. Such inertia, covered up by beautiful phrases and theatrical pose, brought certain dividends to the figures of the Central Rada in the polemic with the conservative Russian Provisional Government. They were believed, they had the sympathy of the Ukrainian population.

However, after the far left radical Bolsheviks seized power in Petrograd, everything changed. Due to their political naivety and indecision, the Ukrainian leaders lost the decisive duel for the soldiers' consciousness to the Bolsheviks. Not with rifles and cannons, but with propaganda skillfully built on populist slogans, Leninist agitators removed the majority of the soldiers of the Ukrainianized units from the ideological influence of moderate Ukrainian parties. Weary of the war, they sought to return home as soon as possible to divide the landlord's land.

According to Vynnychenko, the Central Rada leaders watched with sadness as before their eyes “the regiments named after various hetmans, who so consciously, so harmoniously, so resolutely entered the capital of Ukraine to defend and protect it, who so cheered all national hearts with their national consciousness, sincerity, yellow-blue flags and Ukrainian songs, who so loudly shouted “glory” to the Ukrainian government, these regiments, after a couple of weeks, in a strange way, first lost their enthusiasm, then fell into apathy, into “neutrality” towards the Bolsheviks, and then… turned their Ukrainian bayonets against us together with those Bolsheviks.”

== See also ==
- Ukrainization
- Ukrainian People's Army
- Imperial Russian Army

== Sources ==
- Kharuk, Andriy (13 December 2017). "Крила революції. Як в УНР створили власні повітряні сили" [Wings of the Revolution. How the UNR Created Its Own Air Force]. www.dsnews.ua (in Ukrainian). Ділова столиця. Archived from the original on 28 December 2017.
- Zinkevych, R. D. (5 November 2015). "Український військовий рух в умовах загострення політичної конфронтації у Росії восени 1917 р." [Ukrainian military movement in the context of the aggravation of political confrontation in Russia in the fall of 1917]. www.ukrmilitary.com. Ukrainian Military Pages.
- Михайло Ковальчук. "Українізація на Південно-Західному фронті російської армії (травень-листопад 1917)" [Ukrainization on the Southwestern Front of the Russian Army (May–November 1917)] (PDF).
- Kalynchuk, Dmytro (2012-03-16). "Від імператорської до національної: як українізувалися частини російської армії" [From imperial to national: how parts of the Russian army were Ukrainized]. tyzhden.ua. Український тиждень.
- "Українізація війська 1917 року" [Ukrainization of the army in 1917]. www.armyfm.com.ua. Армія FM. 2022-06-16.
- "Синьо-жовтий прапор над Кремлем" [Blue and yellow flag over the Kremlin]. www.istpravda.com.ua. Історична правда. 2022-08-23. Archived from the original on 2022-08-23.

=== Books ===
- Halushko, K. (2016). Історія українського війська [History of the Ukrainian army] (in Ukrainian). Kharkiv: Клуб сімейного дозвілля. ISBN 978-617-12-1472-9.
- Pinak, Yevhen; Chmir, Mykola (2017). Військо української революції [Army of the Ukrainian Revolution] (in Ukrainian). Харків: Клуб сімейного дозвілля. ISBN 978-617-12-3399-7.
- Petriv, Vsevolod (1927). Спомини з часів української революції (1917—1921) [Memories from the Ukrainian Revolution (1917–1921)] (in Ukrainian). Vol. 1. Lviv.
- Kedrowsky, Volodymyr (1967). "Початки українізації армії (pp. 160–180); Українізація на фронтах (pp. 211–217)". 1917 рік [1917] (PDF) (in Ukrainian). Winnipeg: «Тризуб».

== Literature ==
- Верстюк В. Чому українізація частин російській армії не була успішною? // Перелом: Війна Росії проти України у часових пластах і просторах минувшини. Діалоги з істориками. У 2-х кн. — Кн. 1 / Відп. ред. В. Смолій. — К.: Інститут історії України НАН України, 2022. — С. 625—629. — ISBN 978-966-02-9982-5.
