= Ukrainian People's Army =

Army of the Ukrainian People's Republic (1917–1921)

- Active: 1917–1921
- Country: Ukraine
- Type: Army
- Role: Land warfare
- Size: 100,000 personnel at its peak
- Engagements: Russian Civil War; Kiev Arsenal January Uprising; Battle of Kruty; Battle of Kiev (1918); Crimea Operation (1918); Anti-Hetman Uprising; Katerynoslav March; 1919 Soviet invasion of Ukraine; Battle of Kiev (January 1919); Proskuriv offensive; Battle of Vapniarka; Capture of Kiev by the White Army; First Winter Campaign; Polish-Ukrainian War; Battle of Lutsk (1919); Polish-Soviet War; Kiev offensive (1920); Battle of Lwów (1920); Second Winter Campaign; Battle of Bazar

Commanders
- Chief Otaman: Symon Petliura

The Ukrainian People's Army (Ukrainian: Армія Української Народної Республіки, romanized: Armiia Ukrainskoi Narodnoi Respubliky), also known as the Ukrainian National Army (UNA) or by the derogatory term Petliurivtsi (Ukrainian: Петлюрівці, lit. '"Petliura's people"'), was the army of the Ukrainian People's Republic (1917–1921). They were often quickly reorganized and Ukrainized units of the former Imperial Russian Army and newly formed volunteer detachments that later joined the national armed forces. The army lacked a certain degree of uniformity, adequate leadership to keep discipline and morale. Unlike the Ukrainian Galician Army, the Ukrainian People's Army did not manage to evolve a solid organizational structure, and consisted mostly of volunteer units, not regulars.

== History ==
=== Creation: Military congresses ===
When the Central Rada came to power in Ukraine in spring of 1917, it was forced to promptly put together an army to defend Ukraine against the Bolsheviks. Nearly all units of the newly created army were Ukrainianized from the Imperial Russian Army. On March 29, 1917 the first organization of military forum the Ukrainian Military Club was organized at the Kiev Military District on the initiative of Mykola Mikhnovsky. Also during 1917 there were three All-Ukrainian Military Congresses that elected their representatives to the Central Rada. After the first such congress that took place on May 18–21, 1917 in Kiev, the Ukrainian General Military Committee was created. The committee was placed in charge for creation and restructuring of the army. The head of the committee was elected the future first General Secretary of Military Affairs, Symon Petlyura.

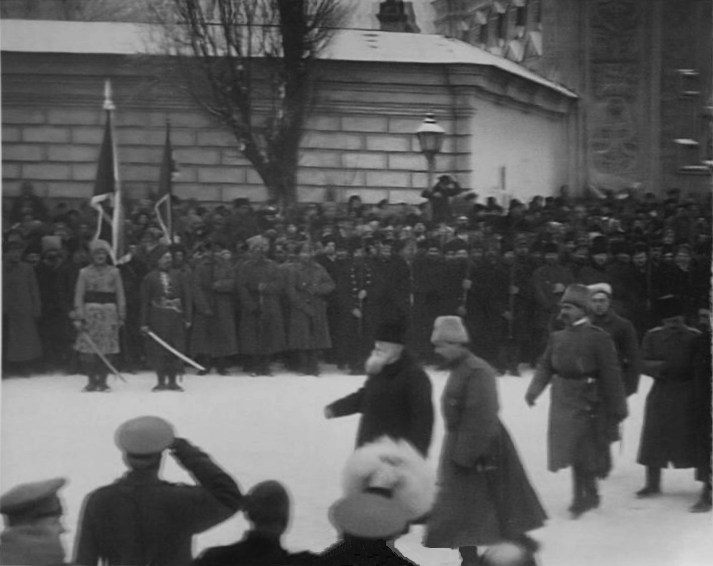
Head of the Ukrainian Central Rada, Mykhailo Hrushevskyi, at a military parade in Kiev in 1917

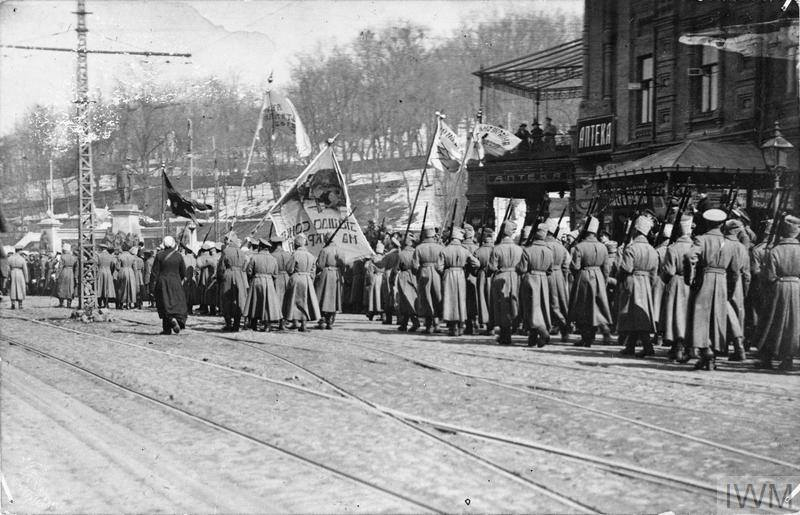
Ukrainian soldiers in Kiev in 1917

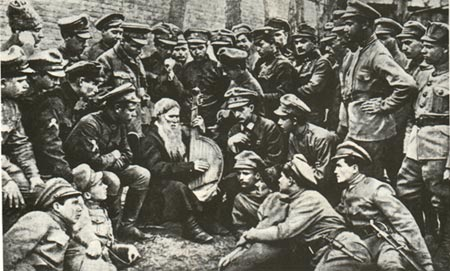
Soldiers of the Ukrainian People's Army in 1917

The next congress, defying a ban placed by the Russian Provisional Government, took place on June 18–23, 1917 in Kiev. At this congress the First Universal of the Central Rada was read and the first elections to that institution took place. The last congress took place on November 2–12, 1917 and also in Kiev. Due to the civil unrest that was initiated by the Bolsheviks across the country also known as the October Revolution the congress took longer than its predecessors as it was interrupted for a few days in order to create the 1st Ukrainian Regiment for the Defense of Revolution (headed by Colonel Yuri Kapkan). The main requests of the congress were proclamation of the Ukrainian Democratic Republic, full Ukrainization of army and navy, and an immediate peace treaty.

At the time, the Central Rada did not see the need for a standing army, reinforced by conscription. Instead, a 'Free Cossack' concept (which was no different from a militia) was introduced and ratified in November 1917. Only when the Bolsheviks invaded the Ukrainian People's Republic, in December 1917, was the need for a regular standing army appreciated. The new organization was to include; eight infantry corps and four cavalry divisions. But these plans were never realized, as the Rada was overthrown in a coup led by Pavlo Skoropadsky, who brought the Hetmanate to power in Ukraine. A temporary peace treaty with the Bolsheviks was also signed on 12 June 1918.

After taking power, the Hetmanate government established its own plans for a standing army. These were to consist of 310,000 military personnel divided into eight territorial corps, with an annual budget of 1,254 million karbovantsi. However, this army did not develop beyond the organizational stage, due to many dissident movements and gross unpopularity of the Hetmanate amongst peasants and civilians. In November 1918, the Directorate came to power in Ukraine, bringing with it yet another vision for the structure of the army. During this time, most units simply crossed from the Hetmanate to the Directorate with little organizational change occurring.

=== War of Independence ===
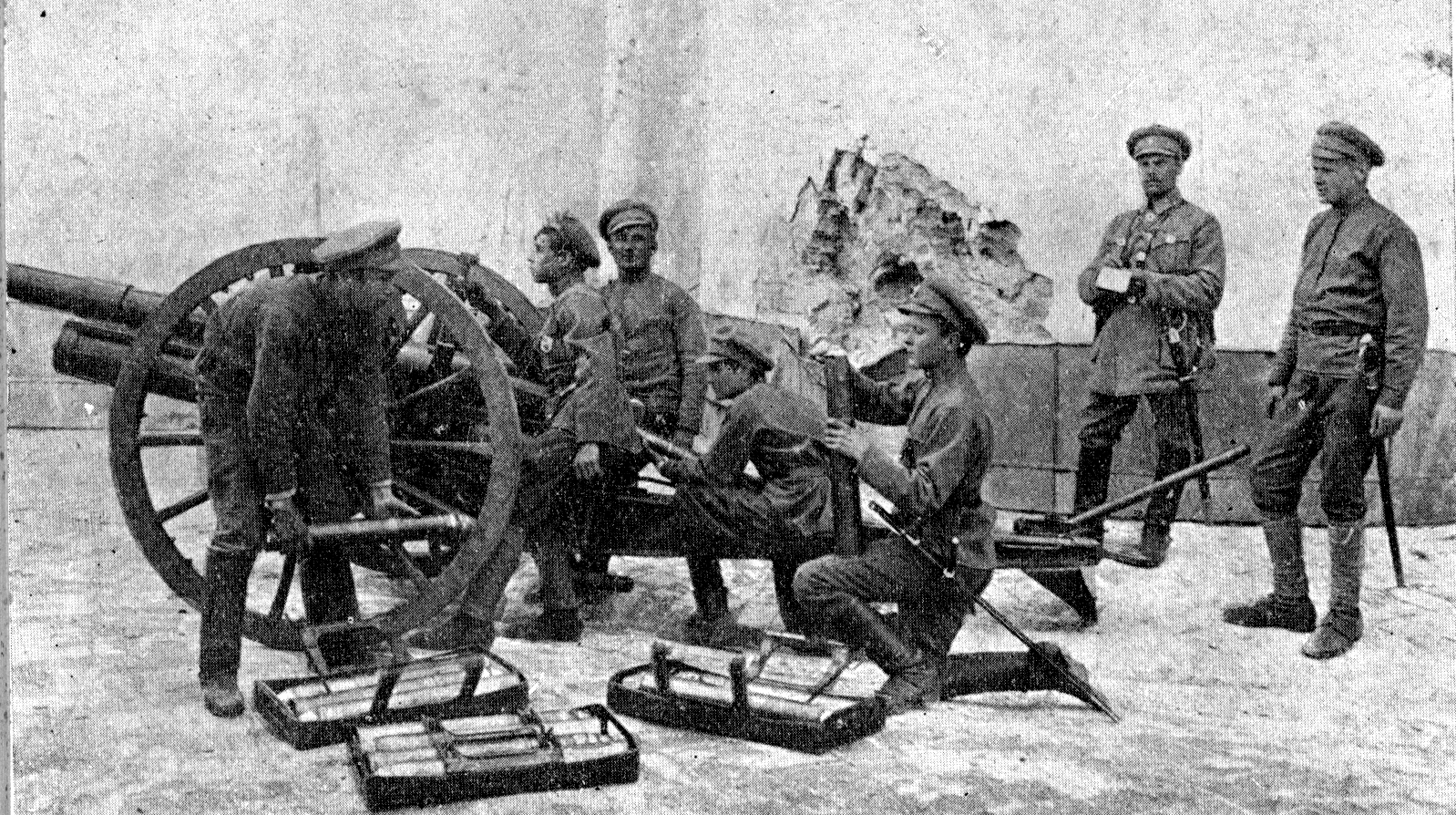
Sich Riflemen with a howitzer

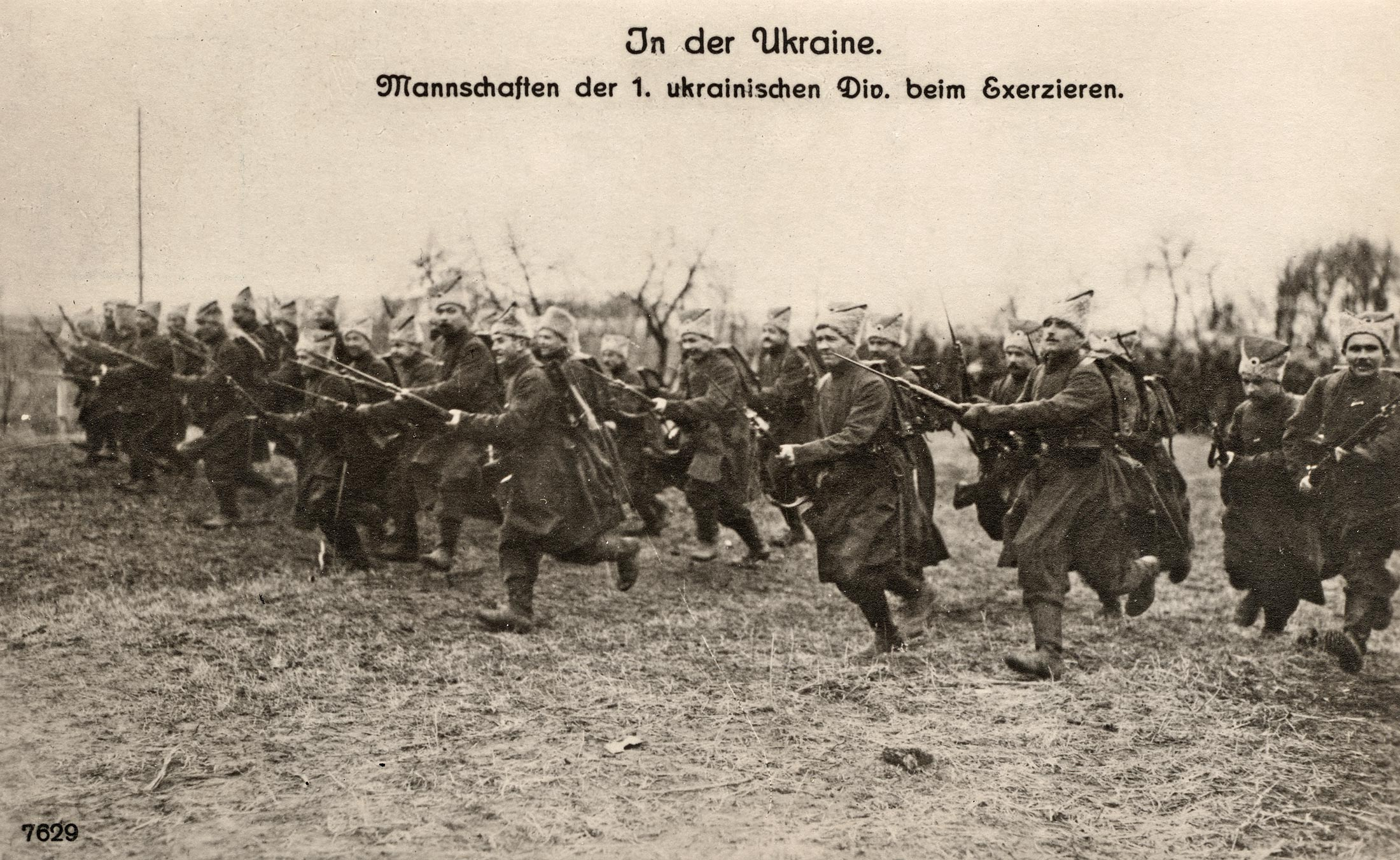
The 1st Ukrainian Division was formed in the spring of 1918 by Ukrainian POWs in German camps. Since they wore blue coats they were generally called Sinyozhupanna.

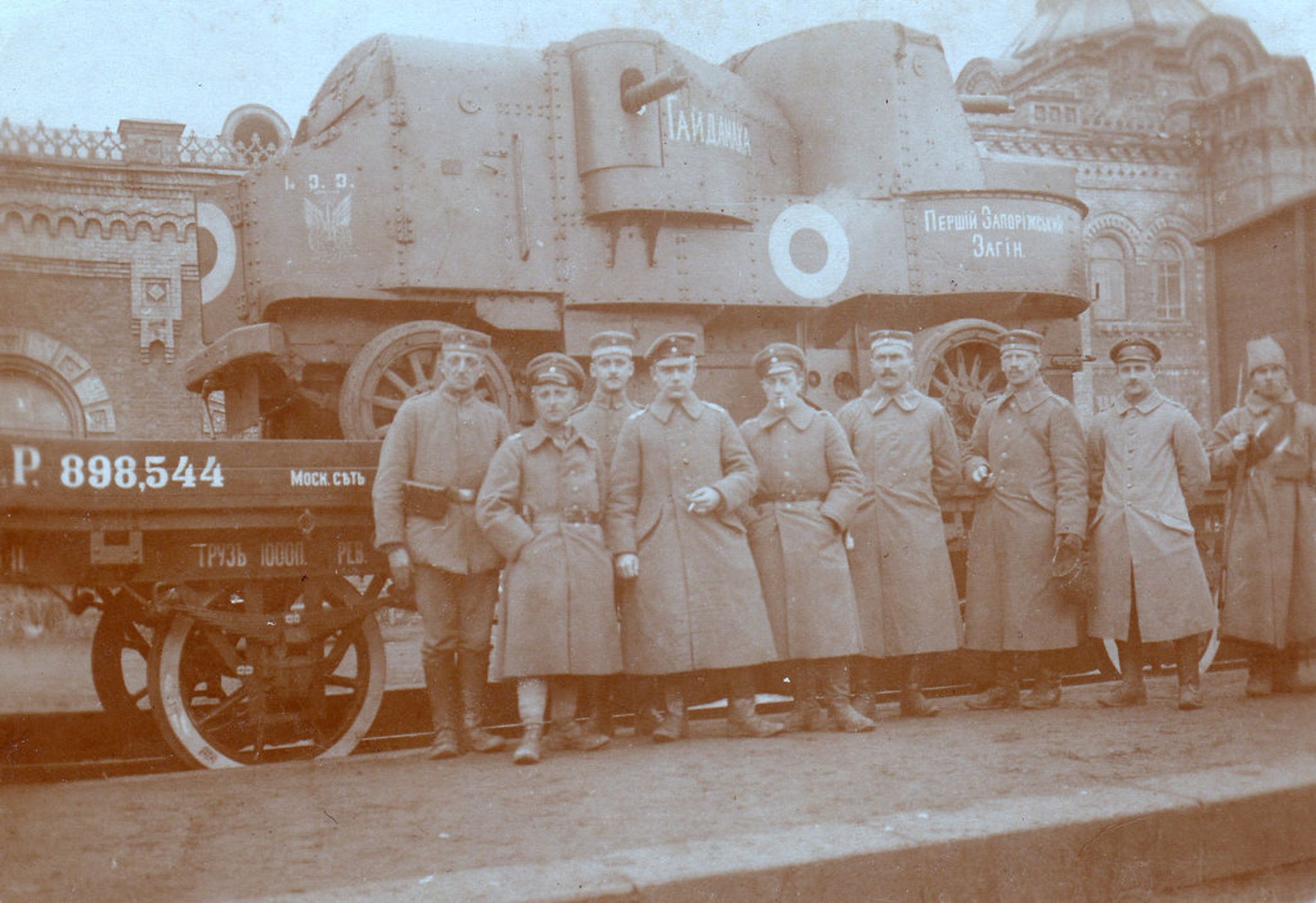
Troops from the 1st Zaporizhian Detachment with a Garford-Putilov Armoured Car called "Haidamaka"

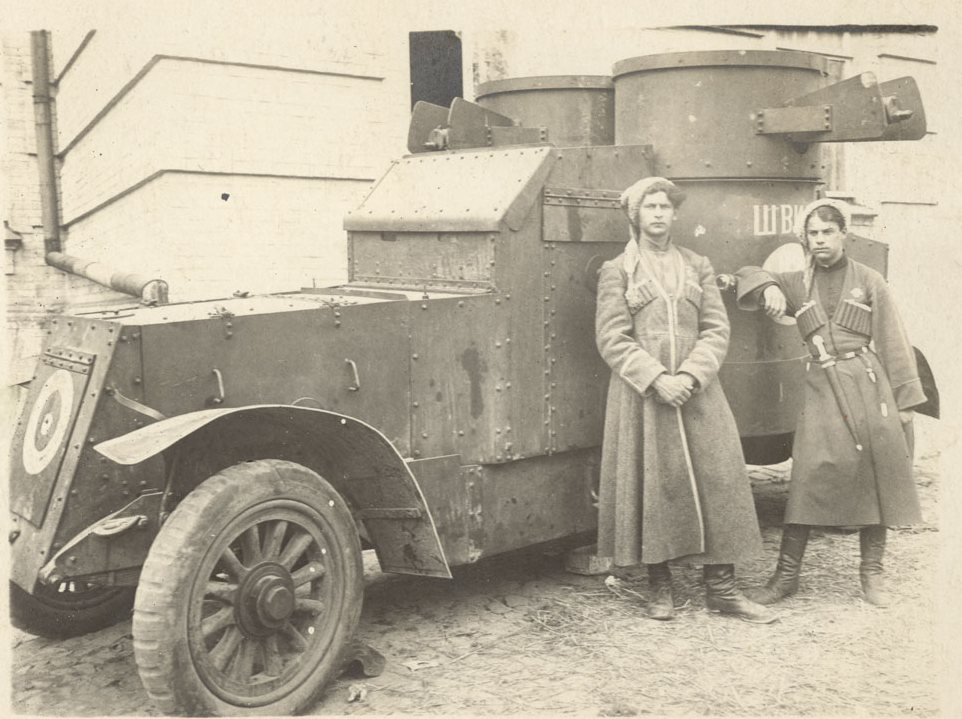
3rd Haidamatsky Infantry Regiment of Sloboda Ukraine troops with an Austin Armoured Car called "Shvidkiy"

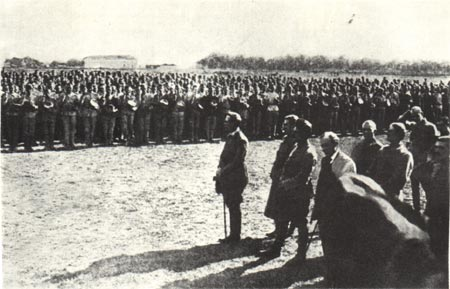
Newly enlisted volunteers swearing an oath of allegiance in 1919

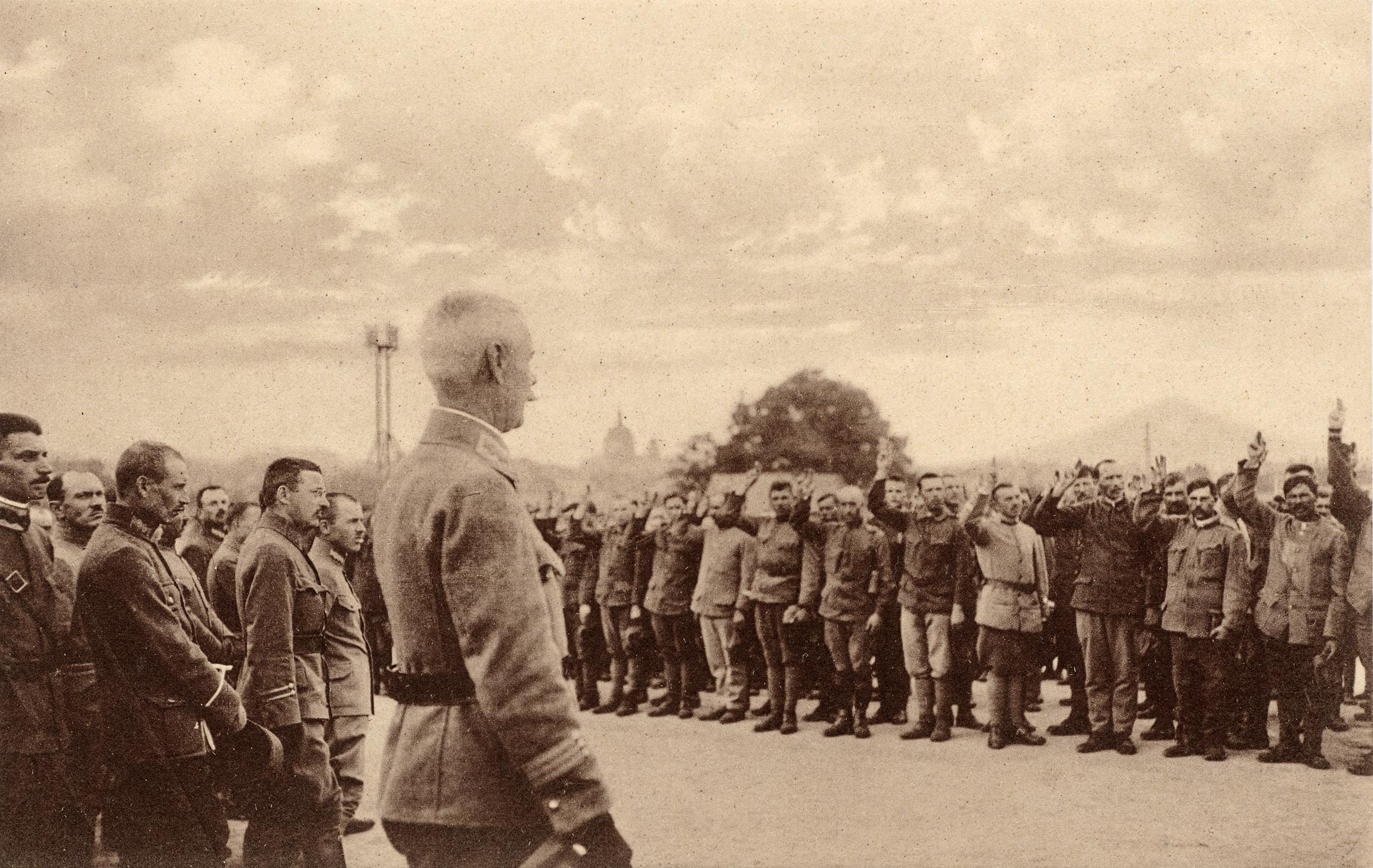
Ukrainian POWs released from Serbian captivity swear the oath of allegiance to Ukraine and the Ukrainian Brigade on August 3, 1919

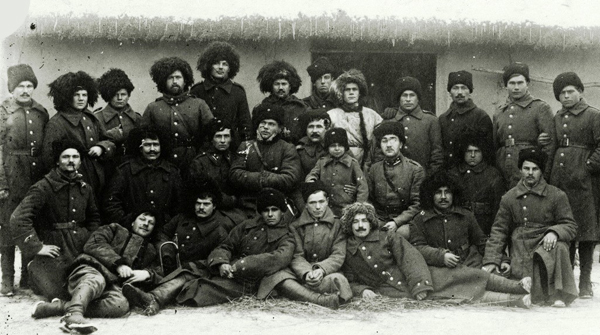
UPR soldiers who participated in the 1919 First Winter Campaign

The Bolsheviks first invaded the Ukrainian People's Republic in January 1918. After several weeks of battle, the Red Army overwhelmed the fairly small Ukrainian force, and took Kiev on February 9. This forced the Central Rada to seek help from the Central powers of World War I. After signing the Treaty of Brest-Litovsk, the Ukrainian Army was to receive assistance in fighting the Red Army. A German-Austrian Operation Faustschlag offensive removed the Bolsheviks from Kiev in early March, and the Rada government returned to the capital. In April, the Red Army was forced to completely retreat from Ukraine, and a peace treaty was signed. The German/Austro-Hungarian victories in Ukraine were due to the apathy of the locals and the inferior fighting skills of Bolsheviks troops compared to their Austro-Hungarian and German counterparts.

The defeat in the open confrontation with the Bolsheviks and the temporary loss of a significant part of the territory sobered the leaders of the Central Rada, who finally understood the need to have their own regular armed forces, and not a people's militia. For this reason, after returning to Kyiv, the Ministry of War and the General Staff developed a plan for the deployment of the army, according to which it was to consist of 16 infantry divisions (64 regiments), organized into 8 territorial corps (I Volyn Corps, II Podilsky Corps, III Kherson Corps, IV Kyiv Corps, V Chernihiv Corps, VI Poltava Corps, VII Kharkiv Corps and VIII Katerynoslav Corps), 4 cavalry divisions and 1 cavalry brigade (18 regiments).

On April 17, 1918 corps commanders were appointed. The first draft of recruits was planned for mid-October 1918, for which the network of local military administration bodies at the county and provincial levels began to be restored. However, other people had to take on the practical implementation of the planned measures. However, these armed forces proved to be neither battleworthy nor well-organized. At the time most of Pavlo Skoropadskyi's Ukrainian State forces changed sides and joined the Directorate.

After the Directorate's rise to power, on 25 November 1918 the new government issued an order for general mobilization, and by December the army reached its peak at an estimated 100,000 recruits. In order to prevent inflitration by Bolshevik agitators, only people who recognized the authority of Ukrainian People's Republic were accepted into the ranks of the army. Nevertheless, Communist propaganda had a great influence on its personnel, leading to mass desertions. Due to this factor, along with the absence of a long-term mobilization plan, as well as lack of supplies and equipment, soldiers were poorly motivated, and units had a hard time with attracting new recruits. At the same time, mobilizatio efforts were much more successful in areas which had previously suffered from Bolshevik terror.

In January 1919, Ukraine declared war on Soviet Russia, after the latter established a provisional government in Kharkiv, proclaiming the Ukrainian Soviet Socialist Republic. Simultaneously, the West Ukrainian People's Republic had taken Lviv, thereby beginning a war with the Second Polish Republic. In January 1919, the Ukrainian People's Republic and the West Ukrainian People's Republic united, but their institutions continued to function separately. By July West Ukrainian People's Republic had been completely occupied by Polish forces, and Kiev by Soviet forces. Symon Petlyura became the commander in chief of the new Ukrainian Army, which improved its order and discipline. Special inspectors with wide authority were introduced, similar to Bolshevik commissars. The army grew as 35,000 soldiers of central Ukraine were joined by 50,000 Galicians. Having this force, the army of the UNR launched a successful campaugn against Kiev and Odessa in August 1919. But eventually the united armies suffered severe casualties, fighting simultaneously against the Polish army, Denikin's Whites and the Bolsheviks. An epidemic of spotted fever contributed to this defeat. Therefore, Ukraine signed an armistice with the Entente and later with Poland in May 1919.

After failing to capture Kiev on their own, the Ukrainian army signed the Treaty of Warsaw with Poland, in April 1920. Under the treaty, Ukrainian forces fought side by side with Polish forces against Soviet Russia and other Ukrainian 'Red' movements (Denikin, the Germans and the Entente had long since been expelled from Ukraine). However, despite the alliance, Polish command prevented 15,000 soldiers of the former Red Galician Army from joining the Ukrainian force, and put obstacles to the mobilization of locals in Podolia. In some cases, Ukrainian troops resorted to taking hostages from among relatives of deserted recruits. Following a decisive failure in the Kiev offensive, Ukrainian presence only decreased in the seesaw Polish-Soviet war. Finally, Soviet Russia and Poland signed the Treaty of Riga on March 18, 1921, ending the war. The small remnants of the Ukrainian People's Army either resorted to guerrilla warfare or joined the Polish Army.

== Structure ==
The headquarters of the Ukrainian Armed forces was called the General Bulawa. The original structure of the army, as designated by the Tsentralna Rada, planned to organize an optimistic eight infantry corps and four cavalry divisions. But these plans were never realized due to the internal struggle for power in Ukraine. Instead, the army was hastily formed of various armed volunteer units and "Free Cossacks". But in May 1919 (long after the Directorate assumed power), the Ukrainian people's army was forced to reorganize after its manpower dropped from 100,000 to 15,000 in just five months of warfare with Soviet Russia. According to then Ukrainian politician Volodymyr Vynnychenko, this dramatic decrease in manpower occurred mainly because of communist propaganda. The new, semi-organized structure was made up of five brigade-sized "army groups" and a large number of Free Cossacks:

- Sich Riflemen, which were disbanded in late 1919 (5,000 servicemen)
- Zaporizhtsi group (3,000 servicemen)
- Volynska group (4,000 servicemen)
- Udovychenko's regiment (1,200 servicemen)
- Tyutyunnyk's group (1,500)

In May 1920 in the middle of the Polish-Soviet War, the army was once again forced to reorganize, after its strength more than doubled in size. The new structure included: six infantry and one cavalry division. Each infantry division was to have three brigades armed with artillery, a cavalry regiment and an engineer regiment. The single cavalry division had six mounted regiments. The formation of six reserve brigades was also attempted, but this was only partially successful. The reinforcement brigades were later made into an under strength, two brigade machine gun division. Thus, the structure was, as follows:

- 1st Zaporizhska Infantry Division
- 2nd Volynska Infantry Division
- 3rd Zalizna Infantry Division
- 4th Kyivska Infantry Division
- 5th Khersonska Infantry Division
- 6th Sich Rifle Division
- 1st Machine Gun Division (UPR)
- 1st Cavalry Division (UPR)
- Karmelyuk (armored train)
- Chernomorets (armored train)

=== Ranks and insignia ===
Following the reformation that took place among the Ukrainian military units the older Russian rank structure and insignia were dropped and replaced with those of the Hetmanate times. Most notable is the introduction of the rank of Otaman that replaced the General ranks of the Russian army. The army headquarters became known as the General Bulawa. The military representative in the Directorate of Ukraine, Symon Petliura was given the rank of the Chief Otaman. The new position was introduced by the former Russian General and later Otaman Oleksander Hrekov.

Ranks (in descending order) since end of 1917:

General ranks

1. Otaman Frontu
2. Otaman Armii
3. Otaman Korpusu
4. Otaman Divizii
5. Otaman Brihady (Brigadier general)

Other officers

1. Polkovnyk (Colonel)
2. Osavul (Lieutenant colonel)
3. Kurinny (Major)
4. Sotnyk (Captain)
5. Pivsotenny (Lieutenant)

Enlisted

1. Bunchuzhny (Company Sergeant)
2. Chotar (Platoon Sergeant)
3. Royovyi (Sergeant)
4. Kozak (see Cossacks)

Ranks have altered in June 1918, but only for officers:

General (Heneral)

1. Heneralnyi Bunchuzhnyi (General)
2. Heneralnyi Znachkovyi (Lieutenant general)
3. Heneralnyi Khorunzhyi (Major general)

non-General

1. Polkovnyk (Colonel)
2. Viyskova Starshyna (Lieutenant colonel)
3. Sotnyk (Captain)
4. Znachkovyi (Lieutenant)
5. Khorunzhyi (2 Lieutenant)

=== Main military formations (UPR) ===
- 1st Ukrainian Corps, former 34th Russian Corps
- 2nd Sich Zaporozhian Corps, former 6th Russian Corps
- Kurin of Sich Riflemen (not to be confused with the Austrian military formation of Ukrainian Sich Riflemen), formed out of the Austrian prisoners of war interned in Russian concentration camps
  - Cavalry Regiment of Sich Riflemen
- Khmelnytsky Cossack Regiment (Bohdanivtsi)
- Polubotok Cossack Regiment (Polubotkivtsi)
- Zaporizhian Corps
  - 1st Zaporizhian Infantry Regiment (Hetman Doroshenko IR)
  - 2nd Zaporizhian Infantry Regiment
  - 3rd Zaporizhian Infantry Regiment (Hetman Khmelnytsky IR)
  - 3rd Haidamaka Infantry Regiment
  - 1st Zaporizhian Regiment of Haidamaka Cavalry (Kosh Hordienko Cavalry)
  - 1st Zaporizhian Engineer Regiment
  - 1st Zaporizhian Artillery Regiment
  - 1st Zaporizhian Auto-Armor Division
  - Cavalry-Mountainous Artillery Division
  - Zaporizhian Air-Floating Squadron
  - Black Zaporizhians (1 Cavalry Regiment of Black Zaporizhians)
- Free Cossacks
  - Ukrainian Steppe Division (Anti-Bolshevik revolutionary-military unit)
- Ukrainian Marines
  - 1st Hutsul Marines Regiment
  - 2nd Hutsul Marines Regiment
  - 3rd Marines Regiment
- 1st Riflemen-Cavalry Division (Gray-Coats)
- Blue-Coats (military formations)
- Sloboda Ukraine Haidamaka Kish
  - Black Haidamaka Kurin
  - Red Haidamaka Kurin
- 3rd Iron Riflemen Division
  - Sich Riflemen Light Artillery Regiment
  - Don Cossack Regiment (mounted)
- 20th Pavlohrad Cavalry Regiment
- 6th Sich Division (former 2nd Division)
- Kiev Insurgent Division of Yu.Tyutyunyk
- Ukrainian Navy
- Ukrainian People's Republic Air Fleet

=== Main military formations (WUPR) ===
- Ukrainian Galician Army
  - I Galician Corps
  - II Galician Corps
  - III Galician Corps
  - IV Galician Corps
  - V Galician Corps
  - Galician Air Regiment

== Uniforms ==
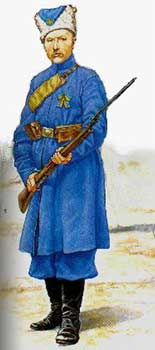
Uniform of a soldier from the Blue Coat Division

Several projects of standard uniform for the Ukrainian People's Army were introduced during 1917-1921, but most of them had a temporary character. The first order concerning uniforms was issued by Symon Petliura on 30 December 1917 and introduced chevrons, gorget patches and blue-and-yellow cockades for Ukrainian soldiers. On 8 January 1919 another order was adopted, according to which grey zhupans, pants and fur hats were to be introduced as campaign uniform, meanwhile the parade uniform was to consist of a long blue zhupan, red sharovary and a Cossack hat.

However, due to loss of control over most of the Ukrainian territory by the government, it was impossible to realize the project of a single uniform standard, and by summer 1919 Ukrainian soldiers continued wearing various uniforms inherited from the Russian and Austro-Hungarian armies. In order to distinguish own soldiers from the enemy, the command adopted chevrons and triangles of various colours, which were to be placed on sleeves and designated allegiance to various army branches.

The common headwear among soldiers of both the Ukrainian People's Republic and the Ukrainian Galician Army were peaked caps modelled on headgear of the British Army. Some units, such as the Sich Riflemen, were equipped with steel helmets, adorned with blue rhombuses with yellow tryzubs. Officers of the People's Army wore frenches with four pockets, meanwhile common soldiers were usually dressed in gimnasterkas, khaki pants and fastened boots.

== List of generals ==
- Lieutenant (Poruchik) General Borys Bobrovskyi (1868 – 1918), Major General of the former Imperial Russian Army
- Lieutenant General Nikolai Bredov (1873 – 1945), Lieutenant General of the former Imperial Russian Army (brief period in 1918)
- Lieutenant (Poruchik) General Serhiy Diadiusha (1870 – 1933), Major General of the former Imperial Russian Army
- Lieutenant (Poruchik) General Fedir Kolodiy (1872 – 1920), Major General of the former Imperial Russian Army
- Lieutenant (Poruchik) General Pavlo Kudriavtsev (1873 – 1921), Lieutenant Colonel (Voyskovoy Starshina) of the former Imperial Russian Army
- Lieutenant (Poruchik) General Mykola Koval-Medzvetskyi (1868 – 1929), Major General of the former Imperial Russian Army
- Lieutenant (Poruchik) General Antin Maslinyi (1865 – 1929), Major General of the former Imperial Russian Army
- Lieutenant (Poruchik) General Oleksandr Mykhailiv (1868 – ????), Major General of the former Imperial Russian Army
- Lieutenant (Poruchik) General Nikolai Volodchenko (1862 – 1945), Lieutenant General of the former Imperial Russian Army
- Lieutenant (Poruchik) General Oleksandr Vyshnivskyi (1890 – 1975), Sub-Lieutenant (Podporuchik) of the former Imperial Russian Army
- Lieutenant (Poruchik/Znachkovy) General Petro Yeroshevych (1870 – 1945), Major General of the former Imperial Russian Army
- Colonel (Polkovnyk) General Sergei Delvig (1866 – 1944), Lieutenant General of the former Imperial Russian Army
- Colonel (Polkovnyk) General Oleksiy Galkin (1866 – 1941), Lieutenant General of the former Imperial Russian Army
- Colonel (Polkovnyk) General Mykhailo Omelianovych-Pavlenko (1878 – 1952), Colonel of the former Imperial Russian Army
- Colonel (Polkovnyk) General Pavlo Shandruk (1889 – 1979), Sub-Lieutenant (Podporuchik) of the former Imperial Russian Army
- Colonel (Polkovnyk) General Oleksandr Udovychenko (1887 – 1975), Stabskapitän of the former Imperial Russian Army
- Colonel (Polkovnyk) General Andriy Vovk (1882 – 1969), Sub-Lieutenant (Podporuchik) of the former Imperial Russian Army
- Colonel (Polkovnyk) General Mykola Yunakiv (1871 – 1931), Lieutenant General of the former Imperial Russian Army
- Colonel (Polkovnyk) General Oleksandr Zahrodskyi (1889 – 1968), Stabskapitän of the former Imperial Russian Army
- Colonel (Polkovnyk) General Viktor Zelinskyi (1864 – 1940), Major General of the former Imperial Russian Army
- Full (Bunchuzhny) General Alexander Ragoza (originally Oleksandr Rohoza; 1858 – 1919), General of the Infantry of the former Imperial Russian Army (in 1918)

== Ukrainian Military Cemetery ==
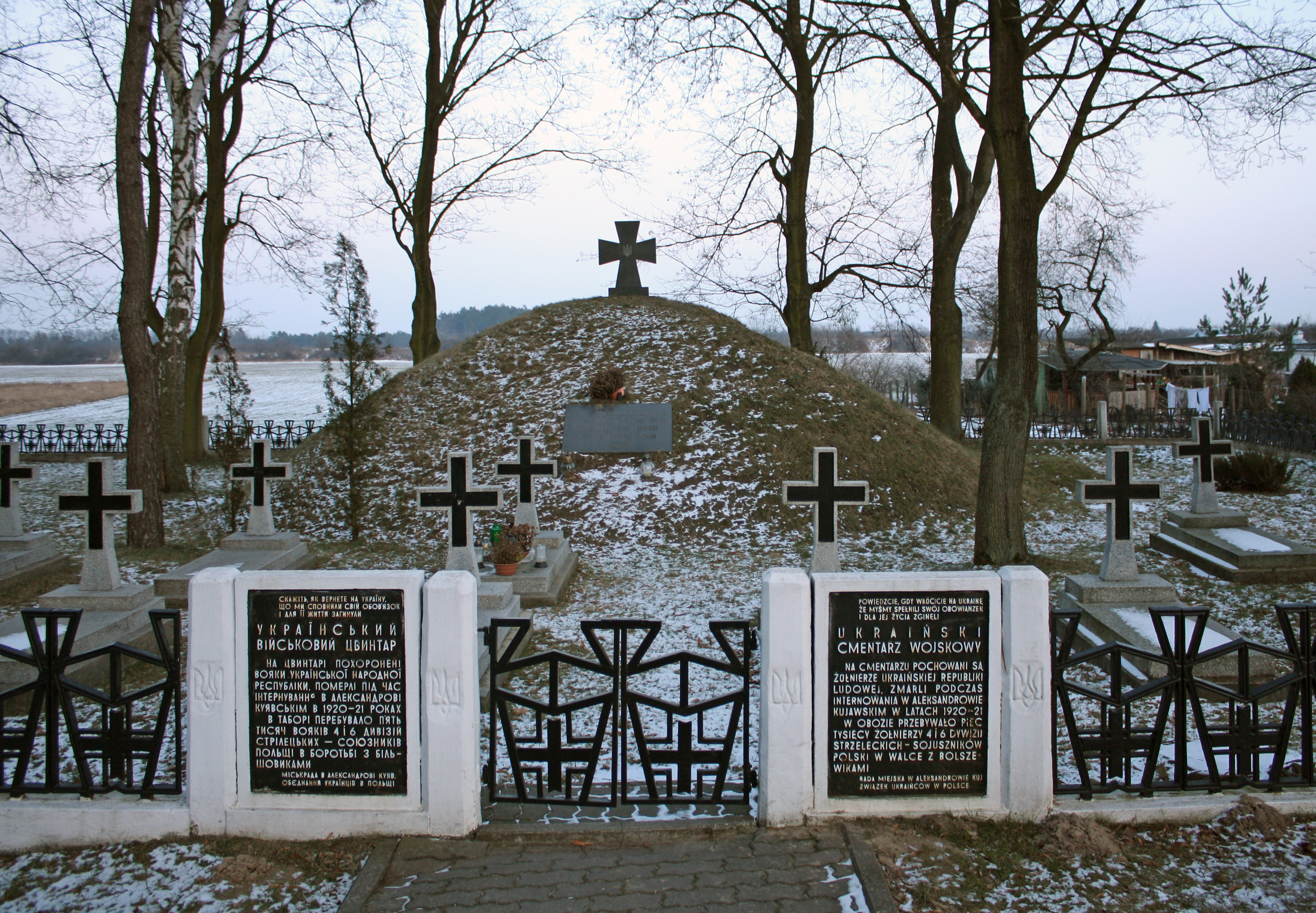
General view of the cemetery

The Ukrainian Military Cemetery in Aleksandrów Kujawski is the final resting place of 17 soldiers of the Ukrainian People's Army who were interned in Aleksandrów Kujawski internment camp in December 1920 and died during their stay there (before the camp was disbanded in the autumn of 1921). The cemetery is located on Narutowicz Street in Aleksandrów Kujawski. It was entered into the register of historic monuments on 7 June 1995.

The cemetery was established during the camp's existence by other interned individuals. In 1921, Edward Mycielski-Trojanowski donated a piece of land adjacent to the barracks of the internment camp for this purpose. On July 24 of the same year, the officers in the camp organized a collection among the internees to fund the establishment of the cemetery and the erection of a monument. They collected 20,000 Polish marks, which enabled them to tidy up the graves and prepare a design for the commemorative burial mound. The internees themselves carried out the cleaning and construction of the monument.

According to a description of the burial mound made shortly after its construction, it appeared as follows:

On the mound, a black Zaporozhian cross was erected. In the center of the cross was placed the coat of arms – the trident, and on its arms, an inscription in Ukrainian: 'To the fighters for the freedom of Ukraine, officers and soldiers of the 4th and 6th Divisions'. On the other side, there was an inscription: 'Pro Ukraine libertate mortuis' and in Polish: 'To the heroes of the fight for the freedom of Ukraine, 4th and 6th Ukrainian Divisions – 1921'.

On the front slope of the mound, the internees placed a red sandstone plaque with an inscription in Ukrainian: Chaj woroh znaje, szczo kozaćka syła/szcze ne wmerła pid jarmom tyrana/szczo kożna stepowa mohyła/ce wiczna niepimszczena rana (English: Let the enemy know that the Cossack strength has not yet died under the yoke of the tyrant, that every steppe grave is an eternal, unavenged wound).

During the interwar period, the Ukrainian cemetery in Aleksandrów Kujawski became a significant site for annual religious services and patriotic ceremonies, gathering emigrant communities from across the Pomerania and Kuyavia regions. The cemetery, often referred to by Ukrainians as the "Cossack Grave", was a symbol of remembrance for the Ukrainian struggle for independence. On 29 May 1927, for the first time, a memorial service was held at the cemetery in honor of Symon Petliura, a prominent Ukrainian leader. The service was conducted by Father Stefan Rudyk from the Orthodox parish of St. Nicholas in Toruń. From that year onwards, services in memory of Petliura and other deceased participants in the Ukrainian fight for independence became a tradition in Aleksandrów Kujawski, attracting Ukrainians from the entire region. These ceremonies were often followed by commemorative academies.

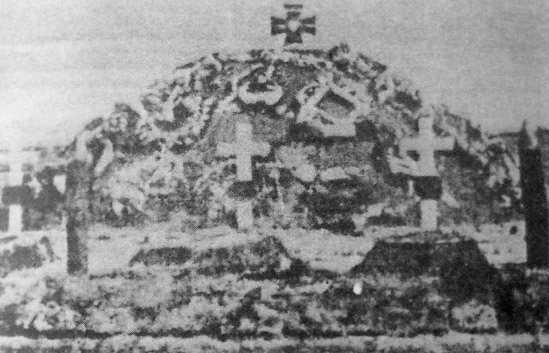
View of the cemetery in 1931

In 1930, the "Cossack Grave" was renovated by a group of emigrants under the supervision of M. Czocha. In 1932, for the first time, the ceremony honoring Petliura was combined with the celebration of the anniversary of the revival of the Ukrainian army.

Viktor Babicz, a participant in the 1939 ceremonies, recalled:

We would arrive for the morning mass at the local Orthodox church, which on that day could not accommodate all the faithful. People came to Aleksandrów Kujawski from all possible directions. Around ten o'clock, everyone would gather around the market square. Here, units of former soldiers of the Ukrainian People's Army began to form. Commands and orders from the senior officers could be heard. The Ukrainian Military Cemetery was well-maintained and decorated with flowers.

=== Post-war history of the cemetery ===
After World War II, the Ukrainian emigrant communities in Kuyavia and Pomerania, including those in Aleksandrów Kujawski and Toruń, became dispersed. As a result, the cemetery was abandoned after 1945.

The initiative to restore the cemetery was taken up in the spring of 1991 by Emilian Wiszka and Colonel Szymon Smetana, with the support of local authorities, particularly the mayor of Aleksandrów Kujawski, Zdzisław Nasiński, and his deputy, Stanisław Krysiński. Between April 1992 and the spring of 1993, cleanup and restoration work was carried out. The original fencing was restored using the remaining posts, and a new commemorative plaque was created with the original inscription in the same font. The work was performed by the Lviv-based company Nekropolis. The project was overseen by the Union of Ukrainians in Poland and the Ukrainian Embassy in Poland, with Sławomir Mąkowski leading the coordinating committee.

The renovated cemetery was officially reopened on 12 June 1993 with an ecumenical service attended by Orthodox, Greek Catholic, Lutheran, and Roman Catholic clergy. The service included Catholic Bishop Bronisław Dembowski of Włocławek, Greek Catholic Metropolitan Jan Martyniak of Przemyśl and Warsaw, Orthodox Archbishop Szymon Romańczuk of Łódź and Poznań, and Lutheran Pastor Jerzy Molin. The independent Ukrainian government was represented by the Ukrainian Ambassador to Poland, Hennadiy Udovenko, and Minister of Defense Volodymyr Mulawa. In his speech, the mayor of Aleksandrów Kujawski emphasized the importance of commemorating shared history in the context of European integration. Jerzy Rejt, chairman of the Union of Ukrainians in Poland, spoke about the necessity of reconciliation between the two nations to prevent future conflicts.

Since that year, an ecumenical service has been held at the cemetery every first Saturday in June.

== See also ==
- Russian Civil War
- Sotnia
- Ukrainian Death Triangle
- Ukrainian Sich Riflemen

== Bibliography ==
- Abbott, Peter (2004). Ukrainian Armies 1914-55. Osprey Publishing. ISBN 1-84176-668-2.
- Waszkiewicz, Z. (2008). "Życie religijne w Obozie Internowanych nr 6 w Aleksandrowie Kujawskim w 1921 roku" [Religious Life in Internment Camp No. 6 in Aleksandrów Kujawski in 1921]. In Wiszka, E. (ed.). Aleksandrów Kujawski. Obozy jeńców i internowanych 1918–1921 [Aleksandrów Kujawski: Prisoner and Internment Camps 1918–1921] (in Polish). Toruń: Wydawnictwo Naukowe Uniwersytetu Mikołaja Kopernika. ISBN 978-83-231-2212-8.
- Wiszka, E. (2005). Emigracja ukraińska w Polsce 1920–1939 [Ukrainian Emigration in Poland 1920–1939] (in Polish). Toruń: MADO. ISBN 83-89886-08-1.
- Cieśla, A. (2008). "Odbudowa Ukraińskiego Cmentarza Wojskowego w Aleksandrowie Kujawskim (1992–1993)" [Reconstruction of the Ukrainian Military Cemetery in Aleksandrów Kujawski (1992–1993)]. In Wiszka, E. (ed.). Aleksandrów Kujawski. Obozy jeńców i internowanych 1918–1921 [Aleksandrów Kujawski: Prisoner and Internment Camps 1918–1921] (in Polish). Toruń: Wydawnictwo Naukowe Uniwersytetu Mikołaja Kopernika. ISBN 978-83-231-2212-8.
