= 1st Ukrainian Corps =

- 1-й Украинский корпус
- Active: August 1917 – January 1918
- Allegiance: Russian Republic; Ukrainian People's Republic
- Type: Army Corps
- Engagements: Revolution and Civil War in Ukraine

Commanders
- Notable commanders: Pavlo Skoropadskyi

The 1st Ukrainian Corps was a Ukrainianized combined–arms military formation created during the "democratization" of the army in Russia in August 1917 based on the 34th Army Corps of Lieutenant General Pavlo Skoropadskyi. After the October Revolution, the 1st Ukrainian Corps became part of the army of the Ukrainian People's Republic, but it ceased to exist in January 1918.

== Background ==
On January 22, 1917, Lieutenant General Pavlo Skoropadskyi was appointed commander of the 34th Army Corps by the Tsar.

After the Kerensky Offensive's failure by the Russian Army, coupled with the Tarnopol breakthrough by the Austro–Hungarian and German troops, General Lavr Kornilov, the 8th Army's commander, who managed to hold the front in a difficult situation, was appointed commander–in–chief of the armies of the Southwestern Front. On the evening of the same day, Kornilov sent a telegram to the Provisional Government with a description of the situation at the front ("The army of maddened dark people ... is running ...") and his proposals for rectifying the situation (the introduction of the death penalty and field courts at the front). Two weeks later, he was appointed the Supreme Commander–in–Chief. Before accepting this position, he stipulated the conditions on which he would agree to do so – one of such conditions was the implementation of the army reorganization program. To restore discipline, at the request of General Kornilov, the Provisional Government returned the death penalty in the army. By decisive and harsh methods, with the use of deserters in exceptional cases, General Kornilov restored the army's combat capability and restored the front.

According to Kornilov, one of the measures that could radically increase the troop's combat capability was the creation of large national military formations – primarily Ukrainian ones. Kornilov noted that it was the Ukrainians who directly defended their native land that showed the greatest stamina and discipline in battle. In August 1917, at Lavr Kornilov's suggestion, Skoropadsky began to "Ukrainize" his corps (104th and 153rd Infantry Divisions). For reorganization, the corps was transferred to the Medzhybizh Region.

The 34th Army Corps was "Ukrainized" with all the Russian soldiers and officers in the unit being transferred to the 41st Army Corps, with their places, both soldier and officer, being substituted with Ukrainians from other parts of the front; in the regiments, along with the all–Russian, national symbols and the Ukrainian language were introduced.

It was assumed that the 1st Ukrainian Corps, consisting of 8 regiments, united in two divisions, would have a total strength of 60,000 soldiers.

== History ==
The date of creation of the 1st Ukrainian Corps in several sources is July 2, 1917, although in fact, Ukrainization began only in August and ended at the end of September.

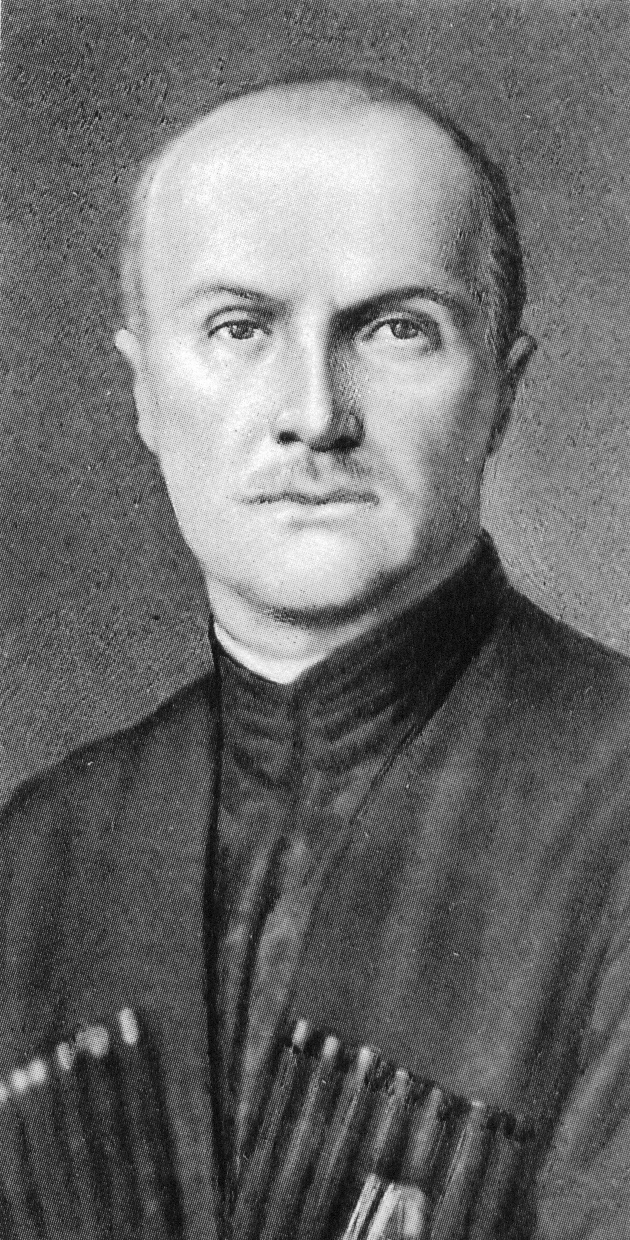
Pavlo Skoropadsky

In October 1917, after the Bolsheviks came to power, Skoropadskyi, having changed his oath to the emperor, recognized the Central Council of Ukraine's power, although its leaders socialist ideas seemed unacceptable to him.

In November–December, the corps implemented the plan developed by the corps' chief of staff, General Yakov Safonov, to neutralize the "Bolshevized" military units of the 2nd Guards Corps, which had left the front and were advancing on Kyiv. Parts of the corps occupied strategically important railway stations – Vinnytsia, Zhmerynka, Koziatyn, Berdychiv, Bila Tserkva and Fastiv – and blocked the way for the Bolsheviks to Kyiv from the south. The "red" echelons were intercepted, disarmed and sent to Soviet Russia.

However, the leadership of the Central Council and the Ukrainian People's Republic continued to treat Skoropadskyi with prejudice, considering him as a future rival in the power struggle or not believing that an aristocrat and one of the wealthiest people of the former empire could sincerely defend the interests of the Ukrainian People's Republic. Skoropadskyi's growing popularity is atested by the fact that he was elected General Ataman on 6 October 1917, at the All–Ukrainian Congress of Free Cossacks in Chigirin, which aggravated relations with the Central Council. This was a manifestation of special trust and respect, testifying to great authority among the masses.

After Symon Petliura's dismissal from the post of Secretary-General of Military Affairs and the appointment of Mykola Porsh in his place, Skoropadsky's relations with the Ukrainian Central Council's leaders completely broke down. The combat general, who was awarded the highest military awards, could not understand why the army's organizational problems were entrusted to a person who never had anything to do with it.

All of Skoropadskyi's efforts to prove the necessity of the existence of the Ukrainian regular army were in vain. On winter's eve, the corps was without food, winter clothing and shoes. This demoralized the fighters, and they began to go home. Experiencing constant pressure from the Central Council's leadership, General Skoropadskyi, to save the corps, on the eve of 1918 was forced to resign from the post of ataman – the commander–in–chief of the Central Rada troops. At the same time, he left the post of commander of the 1st Ukrainian Corps. With the departure of Skoropadsky from the post of commander–in–chief, the Ukrainian Army practically collapsed.

Formally, the 1st Ukrainian corps until the end of 1917 was part of the 7th Army of the Southwestern Front, although the front itself and the army as a single structure did not actually exist anymore.

After General Skoropadskyi's resignation, the corps was actually headed by General Yakov Gandzyuk, head of the 1st Ukrainian Division.

On January 16, 1918, the Central Council issued a temporary "Law on the Formation of the Ukrainian People's Army", according to which the Ukrainianized regiments of the regular army were to be disbanded, replacing them with the people's militia. On January 17, Mykola Porsh issued an order for the army's complete demobilization, which finally disoriented and demoralized the Ukrainianized units.

In January 1918, the corps was split into parts and stationed in Bila Tserkva, Berdichev, Fastov and Vinnytsia to maintain order there and protect the local population from deserters and local gangs. Covering Kyiv from the south, the corps did not have sufficient forces to effectively resist the attack on Kyiv by the Bolshevik troops of Mikhail Muravyov, which unfolded in January 1918. On February 9, Kyiv was taken by Soviet troops, and the day before, on the night of February 7–8, the Ukrainian government and the remnants of the troops of the Ukrainian People's Republic left Kyiv along the Zhytomyr Highway. On one of the last days of Kyiv's defence, General Gandzyuk with the chief of staff, General Safonov, left the corps headquarters for a meeting in Kyiv, not expecting such a sharp change in the situation. At one of the outposts of Soviet troops, they were captured and sent for interrogation to the commander–in–chief Muravyov. Refusing to accept his offer to go into the service of Soviet Russia, on February 9, both generals were shot.

Left without command, units of the corps also lost discipline in an atmosphere of general anarchy, and by mid–February, general desertion began. In February 1918, the corps was demobilized. A small part of it, led by Colonel Nikonov, after the arrival of the Germans, joined the army of the Ukrainian State of Hetman Skoropadsky.

== Composition ==
The 1st Ukrainian Corps consisted of 8 infantry and two artillery regiments and other formations.

- 1st Infantry Division (Commander Major General Yakov Gandzyuk, Chief of Staff Colonel Mykola Kapustiansky);
  - 1st Kyiv Inf. Regiment "Bohdan Khmelnitsky" (commander – Colonel Mayevsky);
  - 2nd Starodubsky Regiment "Hetman Skoropadsky" (Colonel Dmitry Masalitinov);
  - 3rd Poltava Regiment "Hetman Sagaydachny" (Colonel Naum Nikonov);
  - 4th Chernihiv Regiment "Hetman Polubotok" (Colonel Ignaty Porokhovsky).
- 2nd Infantry Division (Commander Major General Viktor Klimenko, Chief of Staff Major General Pyotr Kramarenko).

== Command ==
=== Commander ===
- Pavlo Skoropadskyi (July 2 – December 29, 1917);
- Yakov Gandzyuk (December 29, 1917 – January 27, 1918).

=== Chief of Staff ===
- Yakov Safonov, Major General.

== Sources ==
- Konstantin Zalessky. Who Was Who in the First World War. Biographical Encyclopedic Dictionary. Moscow, 2003
- Military Encyclopedic Dictionary. Moscow, Military Publishing House, 1984. Brest–Litovsk Peace Treaty of 1918. Pages 100–101; Southwestern Front 1914–1917, Page 838
- Valery Klaving. The Russian Civil War: White Armies. Military History Library. Moscow, 2003
- Yaroslav Tynchenko. Ukrainian Armed Forces. Kyiv: Tempora, 2009 – Page 246
