= Battle of Zhmerynka =

Battle of the Ukrainian–Soviet War

- Part of the Bolshevik–Ukrainian War during the Ukrainian War of the Independence in the Russian Civil War and the World War I
| Date | December 1917 – March 1918 |
| Location | Zhmerynka, Kyiv Governorate, Ukrainian People's Republic |
| Result | Ukrainian victory |
| Territorial changes | Bolsheviks were defeated and retreated from the Right–Bank Ukraine |

Belligerents
| Ukrainian People's Republic; Austria-Hungary | Bolsheviks |

Commanders and leaders
| Pavlo Skoropadskyi | Sergey Kashevich †; Pyotr Ptakhin † |

Units involved
| Ukrainian People's Army; Free Cossacks; Austro–Hungarian Army | Red Army; Red Guard; 2nd Guard Corps |

Casualties and losses
| Light | 200+ casualties |

The Battle of Zhmerynka (December 1917 – March 1918) — battle between the Ukrainian People's Army, Austro-Hungarian forces and Red Army. A detachment of the Free Cossacks led by Pavlo Skoropadskyi from the 2nd Guard Corps of the Red Army took part in the battle. Pavlo Skoropadsky managed to drive the Bolsheviks out of Zhmerynka and force them to retreat from the Right Bank Ukraine, and on March 1, 1918 the Central Powers took Kyiv.

== Battle ==
In the last days of December 1917, the troops of the 2nd Guard Corps recaptured Zhmerynka, and the Bolsheviks regained power over the city. In the first 2 days, more than 200 workers of the plant enlisted in the newly organised Red Guard unit. It was also supplemented by soldiers and peasants from the surrounding villages. In early March 1918, battle of Zhmerynka railway station began. The Ukrainian People's Army and Austro-Hungarian forces was fighting against Bolsheviks together. Pavlo Skoropadsky with a regiment of the Free Cossacks managed to stop Bolsheviks near Zhmerynka disarm them, and deport from Right-bank Ukraine. The other Bolshevik forces captured Kharkiv on December 26, Yekaterinoslav on January 9, Aleksandrovsk on January 15, and Poltava on January 20, on their way to Kyiv. On January 27, the Bolshevik army groups converged in Bakhmach and then set off under the command of Muravyov to take Kyiv. After suffering significant losses, the Red Guards retreated. The yellow and blue flag flew over Zhmerynka again. In the battle, the driver of the Zhmerynka locomotive depot, Serhiy Kashevych, was assassinated. One of the streets in the city is now named after him. Another driver who died during the battles on the side of Bolsheviks was Petro Ptakhin.

== Literature ==
- Skoropadskyi, Pavlo (2019). Воспоминания : Конец 1917 – декабрь 1918 [Memories: Late 1917 – December 1918] (in Russian). ПРОЗАиК. ISBN 978-5-91631-282-9.
