= 41st Army Corps (Russian Empire) =

- Country: Russian Empire; Russian Republic
- Allegiance: Imperial Russian Army; Russian Army (1917)
- Engagements: World War I

The 41st Army Corps was an Army corps in the Imperial Russian Army.

== 1915-16 ==
- 9th Army

== 1916-17 ==
As part of the 7th Army the 41st Corps took part in the Kerensky Offensive. Although they consisted of seven divisions rather than the standard four, they were however significantly understrength as the average strength of the rifle companies was 80 as opposed to the nominal 250 on account of mass desertions. Their divisions consisted of:

- 113th Division
- 5th Trans-Amur Division
- 3rd Trans-Amur Division
- 74th Siberian Division

Reserves:

- 23rd Division
- 108th Division
- Polish Division
