= Pavlo Skoropadsky =

Ukrainian and Russian Cossack military and political official; Hetman of Ukraine (1918)

Hetman Pavlo Skoropadsky
- Павло Скоропадський
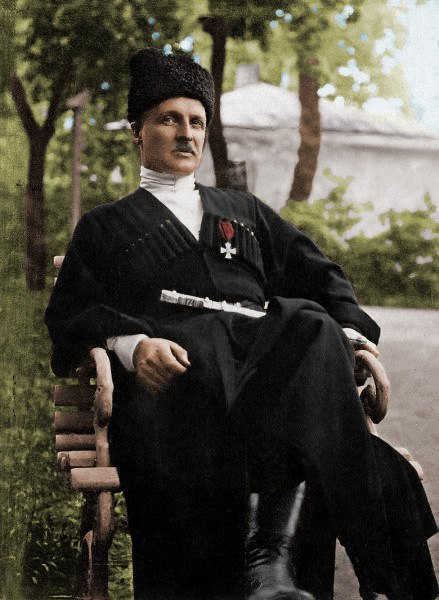
- Skoropadsky in Cossack dress, c. 1920

Hetman of all Ukraine
- In office 29 April 1918 – 14 December 1918
- Preceded by: Position established
- Succeeded by: Position abolished

Supreme Commander‑in‑Chief of the Ukrainian Armed Forces
- In office 29 April 1918 – 14 December 1918
- Preceded by: Position established
- Succeeded by: Symon Petliura (Directory)

Personal details
- Born: 15 May 1873 Wiesbaden, German Empire
- Died: 26 April 1945 (aged 71) Metten, Nazi Germany
- Cause of death: Allied bombing
- Spouse: Oleksandra Durnovo (m. 1898)
- Children: Danylo; Maria; Yelyzaveta; Olena; Pavlo; Petro
- Relatives: Skoropadsky family

Military service
- Allegiance: Russian Empire; Ukrainian People's Republic; Ukrainian State
- Years of service: 1891–1918
- Rank: Lieutenant General
- Battles/wars: See list: Russo-Japanese War; First World War; Eastern Front (World War I); Invasion of Prussia; Russian Civil War; Southern Front of the Russian Civil War; Ukrainian War of Independence; Crimea Operation (1918); Battle of Zhmerynka; 1918 Ukrainian coup d'état; Anti-Hetman Uprising

Pavlo Petrovych Skoropadsky (Ukrainian: Павло Петрович Скоропадський; 15 May [O.S. 3 May] 1873 – 26 April 1945) (Note: For dates prior to 1 March [O.S. 16 February] 1918, when the Ukrainian People's Republic adopted the Gregorian calendar, the Julian (Old Style) calendar dates are used.) (Note: Sometimes spelled as Skoropadskyi or Skoropadskyy; pre-reform Russian: Павелъ Петровичъ Скоропадскій.) was a Ukrainian aristocrat, military leader and statesman who served as the hetman of the Ukrainian State throughout 1918 following a coup d'état on 29 April, of the same year. He abdicated on 14 December 1918.

Born the son of a nobleman, he attended the Page Corps from which he came out an officer. After his service in the Russo-Japanese War, he was promoted to the rank of colonel, later in command of the 20th Finnish Dragoon Regiment in 1910. Skoropadsky would be promoted to major general and aide-de-camp of Nicholas II in 1912. During the First World War, he became a lieutenant general in charge of the 34th Army Corps.

After the February Revolution, which saw the emergence of the Central Rada, Skoropadsky began to Ukrainize his 34th Army Corps, later known as the 1st Ukrainian Corps. With the tacit support of the German Empire, Skoropadsky overthrew the Ukrainian People's Republic and established the Ukrainian State. During his rule, he gave the occupying Austrian and German forces greater control over Ukraine while also appealing to the interests of large landowners.

Opposition to his rule grew, particularly among the rural population, due to the forced requisition of grain by the German and Austrian troops, which often acted violently towards the local Ukrainian peasants. After his issue of a controversial statement proclaiming his aim to join a federal union with the White movement, which was unpopular with many Ukrainians, the Anti-Hetman Uprising broke out on 14 November 1918 and removed him from power, re-establishing the earlier Ukrainian People's Republic.

Despite his short tenure as hetman, he is credited with founding the National Academy of Sciences of Ukraine, establishing diplomatic ties internationally and restoring relative peace and order amidst the wider Russian Civil War.

== Early life ==
Pavlo Petrovych Skoropadsky was born on 15 May [O.S. 3 May] 1873 in Wiesbaden, German Empire, into the noble Skoropadsky family. The family traced its origin back to the Zaporozhian Cossacks, with one Ivan Skoropadsky serving as the Hetman of the Zaporozhian Host from 1708 to 1722. By the 19th century, the Skoropadsky family had become a prosperous noble clan, with many of the men serving as officers in the Imperial Russian Army. Pavlo spent the first 5 years of his life in Germany, even learning German as his first language, after which he moved to Trostianets, then part of the Russian Empire (today in Ukraine). As his father, Colonel Petro Skoropadsky, had contracted syphilis during the Caucasian War, he lived separately from the rest of the family, so Pavlo and his brother, Mykhailo, were raised by their grandfather, Ivan.

In Trostianets, Pavlo was deeply immersed in Ukrainian culture, as his grandfather strictly maintained old Cossack and Ukrainian traditions, although Pavlo did not learn Ukrainian at this time. Besides the overall atmosphere of the Ukrainian countryside, he was also fascinated by the huge collection of portraits of old hetmans, as he was directly related to many of them.

After Petro's death in 1885, Pavlo and Mykhailo were sent to study in Starodub, while the rest of the family moved to Moscow. Despite neither his father nor his grandfather having achieved the rank of general, which was the usual requirement to attend the Page Corps in Saint Petersburg, his mother, Maria Skoropadska, obtained Emperor Alexander III of Russia's personal permission for Pavlo to attend. Starting in 1886, Pavlo found the life at the Page Corps to be difficult, falling into a brief bout of depression after 2 years of largely unsuccessful studying. After a vacation in various parts of Europe with his mother, Pavlo returned to Saint Petersburg and graduated from the Page Corps at the rank of cornet in 1893.

== Military career ==
=== First assignments and Russo-Japanese War ===
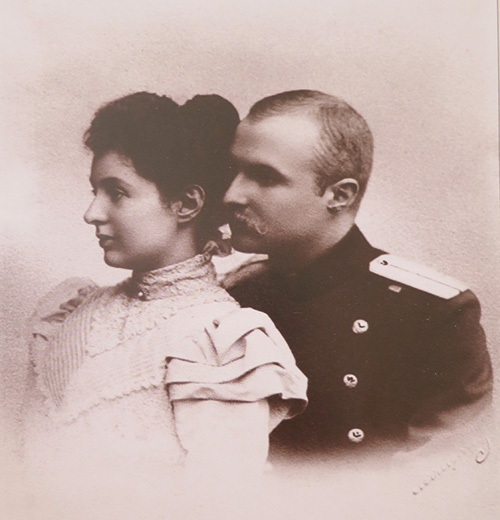
Skoropadsky (wearing lieutenant's insignia) with his fiancée Oleksandra, October 1897

Having graduated, Skoropadsky was assigned to the Chevalier Guard regiment where he was given command of a squadron. After two years he was promoted to be the regimental adjutant in the same regiment. In December 1897, he was promoted to lieutenant. When Skoropadsky's father-in-law died, he also received his substantial estate, making him extremely wealthy for the time.

Skoropadsky arrived in Manchuria on 16 March 1904 after volunteering to be transferred from the capital to the frontlines of the Russo-Japanese War. He was reassigned to the 3rd Verkhneudinsk Regiment under the Trans-Baikal Cossack Host upon his arrival and he began combat on 20 April 1904. On 1 May he was promoted to serve as adjuntant under General F. E. Keller. After Keller was killed in July 1904, Pavlo Skoropadsky remained in a staff position until volunteering to be transferred to the 2nd Chita Cossack Regiment on 1 October, where he took command of the 5th Sotnia of the regiment. He received the Order of St. Anna on 29 October 1904 for his battles against the Japanese from 20 April to 4 July.

In May 1905, he was transferred to serve under Nikolai Linevich. During the war, Skoropadsky was awarded the Golden Weapon for Bravery and several orders. In December 1905, Emperor Nikolai II made him a Fliegel-Adjutant in a rank of colonel. On 4 September 1910, Colonel Skoropadsky was commissioned as the commander of the 20th Finnish Dragoon Regiment, while still continuing to be a Fliegel-Adjutant of the H. I. M. Retinue. On 15 April 1911, he was reassigned to the Leib-Guard Cavalry Regiment. Leib-Guards were the elite Russian military forces assigned for a personal protection of the emperor. On 6 December 1912, Skoropadsky was promoted to the Major General of the H. I. M. Retinue.

=== World War I ===
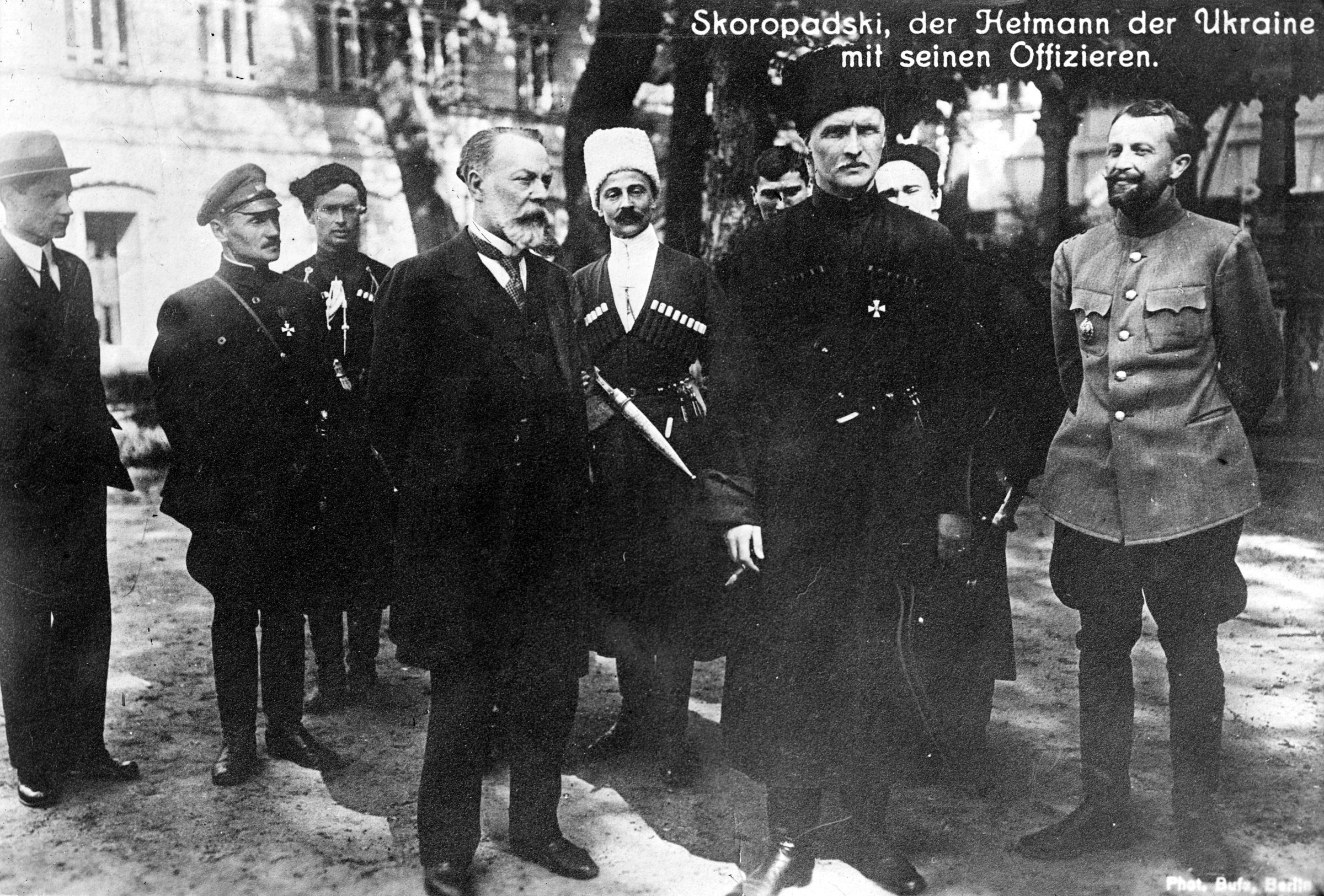
Pavlo Skoropadsky with Fedir Lyzohub

At the start of World War I, Skoropadsky was given command of the reorganized 1st Brigade of the 1st Cavalry Guard Division as part of the 1st Army commanded by General Paul von Rennenkampf. Skoropadsky already worked for von Rennenkampf during the Russo-Japanese War when the latter was commanding Trans-Baikal Cossack Host.

On 6 August 1914, his regiment distinguished itself in battles near Kraupischken as part of the Russian invasion of East Prussia. General Skoropadsky also temporarily commanded the 5th Cavalry Division from the summer of 1915 to March 1916. In March 1916, he was promoted to Lieutenant General and was commissioned the 1st Cavalry Guard Division.

On 22 January 1917, Skoropadsky was made commander of the 34th Army Corps.

Skoropadsky met the news of the February Revolution and Abdication of Nicholas II favourably, expressing hope that the new Provisional Government would lead Russia to greater prosperity. Meanwhile, in Kyiv, power was being seized by the newly-formed Central Rada, which initially sought to achieve autonomy for Ukraine within the Russian Empire and to conduct socialist reform. At the same time, on 5 May 1917, a meeting of 700 representatives of Ukrainian service members from all fronts and fleets gathered in Kyiv and agreed to form the Ukrainian General Military Committee, subordinate to the Rada.

Skoropadsky's 34th Army Corps took part in the failed Kerensky offensive of early June 1917, though without success, being plagued by a breakdown in discipline and low morale. On 19 July 1917, Skoropadsky met Lavr Kornilov, the new supreme commander of the Russian army, at the Southwestern Front headquarters in Kamianets-Podilskyi, where the latter ordered him to Ukrainise his corps. Skoropadsky was initially reluctant, but complied, and began retreating to Medzhybizh, where his 34 Army Corps was transformed into the 1st Ukrainian Corps.

In October 1917, at the first Congress of the Free Cossacks, he was awarded a title of the honorary Otaman. From October to November 1917 his 60,000-man Army Corps successfully defended the railway corridor stretching through Podolie to Polissya, Vapniarka – Zhmerynka – Koziatyn – Shepetivka and defended against the attacks from the Romanian front particularly the 2nd Guard Corps that was headed by Yevgenia Bosch.

== Hetman of Ukraine ==
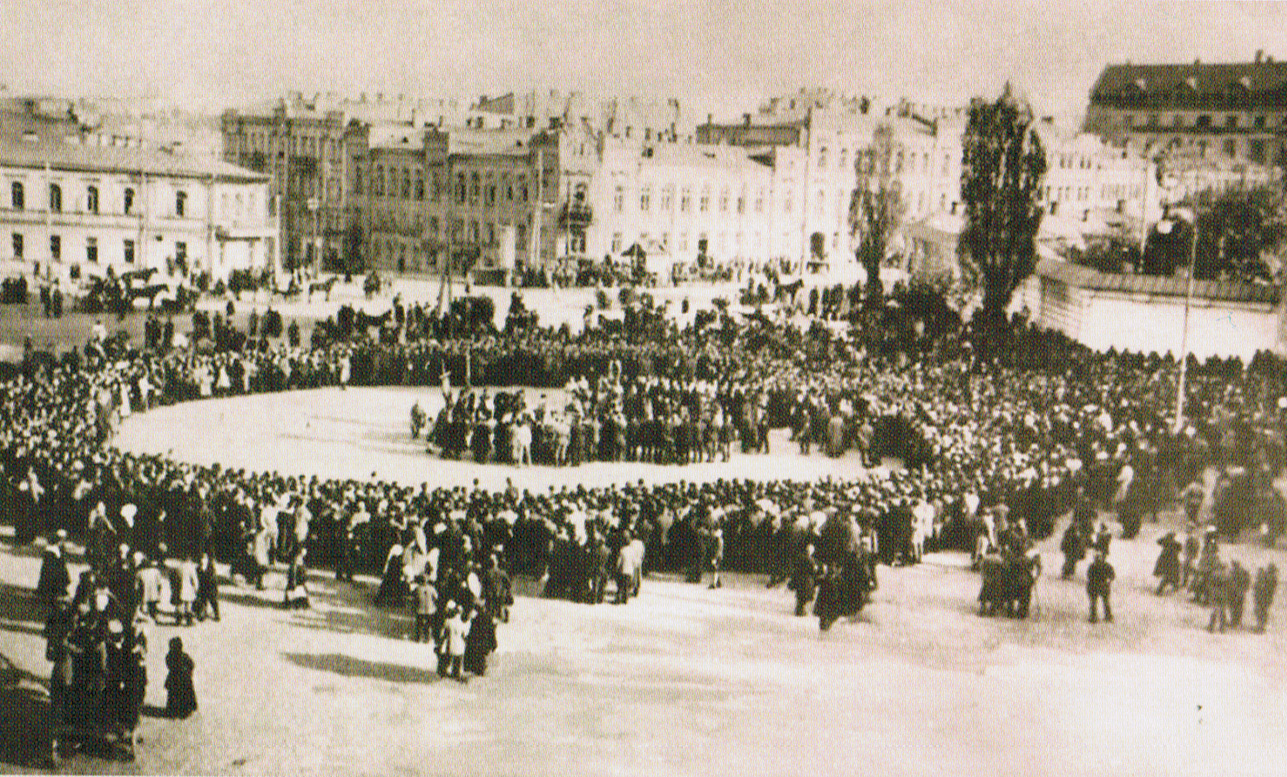
Moleben for Skoropadsky in Sophia Square of Kyiv immediately after his proclamation as hetman

In April 1918, the German troops present in Ukraine according to the Treaty of Brest-Litovsk conducted a coup against the socialist Ukrainian People's Republic and made Skoropadsky Hetman of Ukraine. According to Peter Kenez, "German troops occupied the Ukraine in order to extort as much food and raw material as possible, but the German high command was wary of penetrating deeper into Russia for fear of spreading their army too thin."

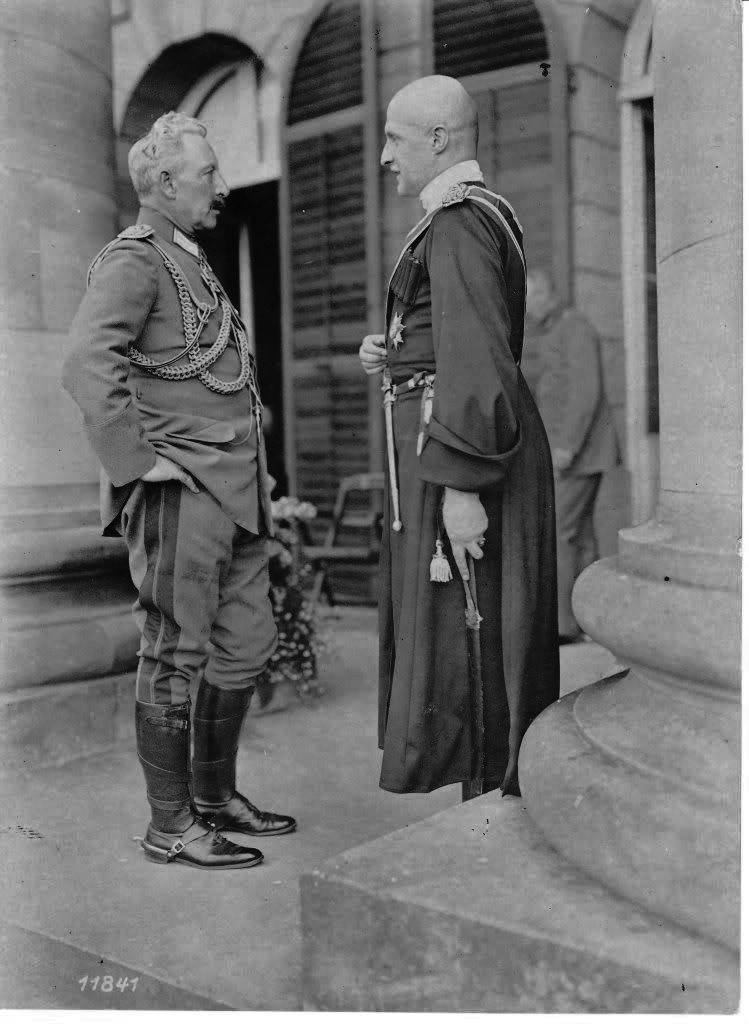
Emperor Wilhelm II of the German Empire (left) and Hetman Skoropadsky (right) at a meeting at the High Command Headquarters in Spa in August 1918.

Skoropadsky was chrismated by bishop Nykodym in Saint Sophia Cathedral. Some Ukrainian nationalists denounced him as a German collaborator supported by wealthy landowners. Some other Ukrainians considered him too pro-Russian and dictatorial. Among other things, Skoropadsky formed a cabinet of mainly Russian-speakers, Tsarists, and Slavophiles. Simultaneously, he committed Ukraine to federation with a restored Russian Empire. Despite these criticisms, by contrast with the earlier Central Rada, his government was given credit in certain circles for forming an effective administrative organization, establishing diplomatic ties with many countries, concluding a peace treaty with Soviet Russia, and founding many schools and universities, including the National Academy of Sciences of Ukraine.

On 11 November 1918, Germany signed an armistice with the Entente – this left the Hetmanate's military and international support in doubt. In the same month an uprising led by the social democrat Symon Petliura started to take power in Ukraine. The uprising nominally restored the Ukrainian People's Republic, but power was vested in the Directoria, a provisional government of five directors chaired by Volodymyr Vynnychenko. Skoropadsky signed an abdication document on 14 December 1918.

== Exile and aftermath ==
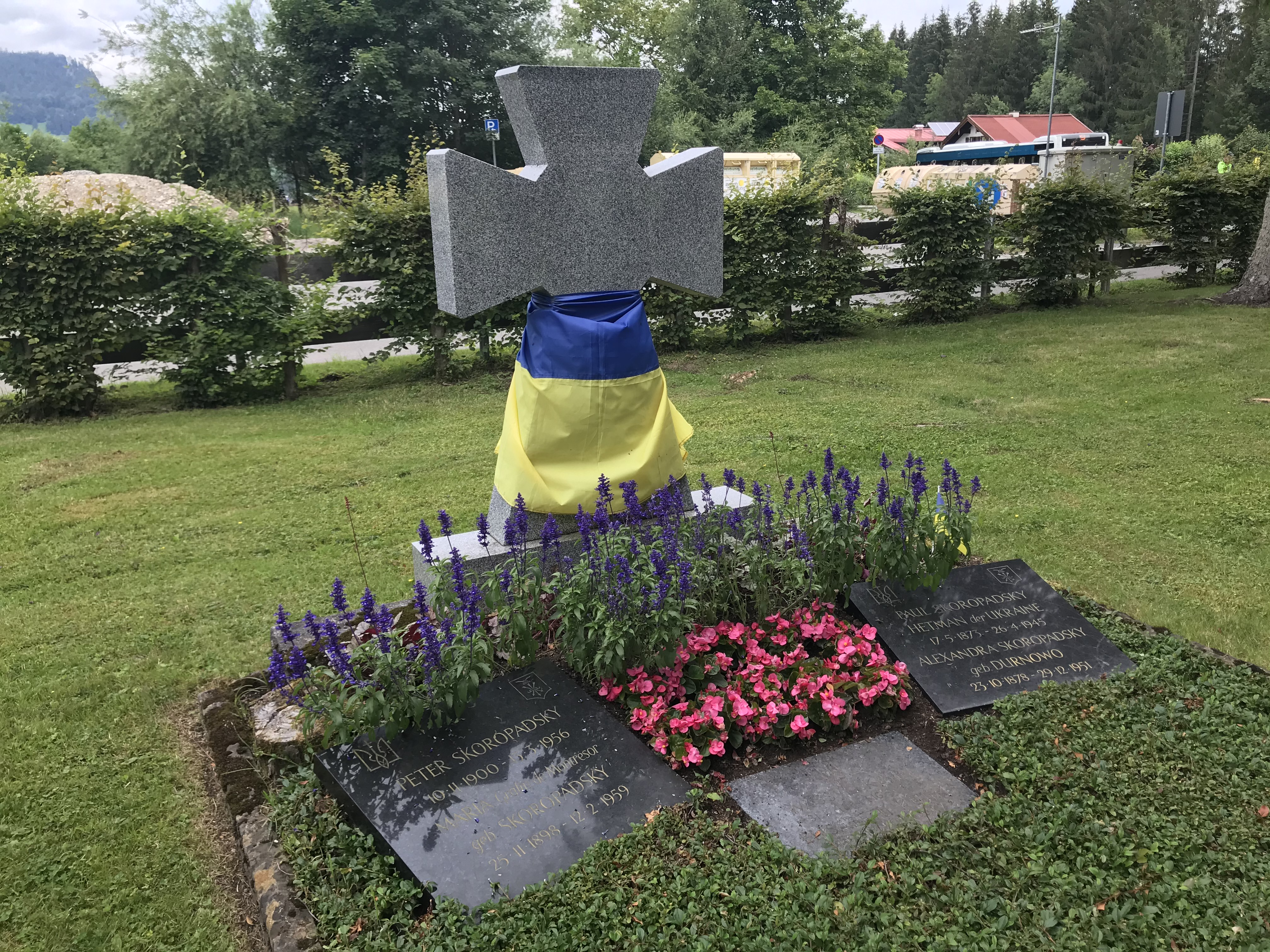
The grave of Skoropadsky family in Oberstdorf, Germany

After going into hiding in Kyiv, Skoropadsky retreated with the withdrawing German forces. He went into exile in Germany in 1919 and settled in Berlin's Wannsee district.

While living in Weimar Germany, Skoropadsky led the Hetmanite movement and maintained close personal friendships with senior government and army officials originating as far back as his military-college days. In later years, however, he consistently refused offers to collaborate with the Nazis.

In the final weeks of World War II in Europe, Skoropadsky fled from advancing Soviet forces with the retreating German army. He died at Metten Abbey in Germany on 26 April 1945 after being wounded during the Allied bombing of Plattling near Regensburg ten days prior, and was buried in Oberstdorf.

His movement continued into the early 1980s, influencing a Ukrainian monarchist program based on the Cossack State model. It ended gradually with the aging of Ukrainian émigré communities.

Skoropadsky's daughter, Olena Skoropadska-Ott (died 2014), resided in Switzerland, visited Ukraine several times, and was honoured for her historical writings.

== Personal life ==
=== Family ===
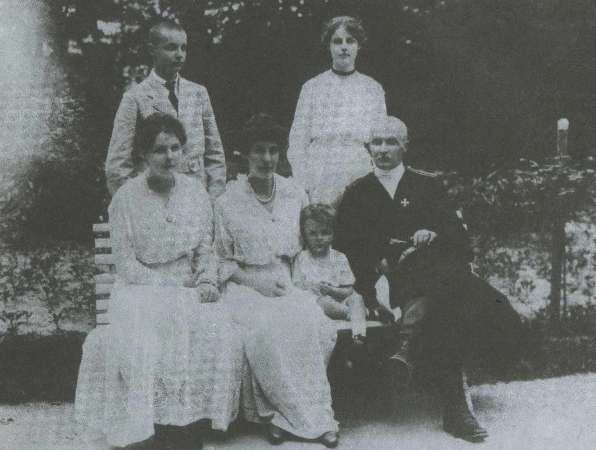
Skoropadsky family after the hetman's exile

On 11 January 1898 in Saint Petersburg, Russia, Skoropadsky married the Russian noblewoman Aleksandra Petrovna Durnovo (23 May 1878 – 29 December 1952), daughter of the Russian soldier and statesman Pyotr Pavlovich Durnovo and his wife Princess Maria Vasiliyevna Kochubey (who came from the Kochubey family, originally of Ukrainian stock).

The couple had six children:

- Maria (Ukrainian: Марія) (1898 – 12 February 1959)
- Yelyzaveta (Ukrainian: Єлизавета) (1899 – 16 February 1976)
- Petro (Ukrainian: Петро) (1900–1956)
- Danylo (Ukrainian: Данило) (1904–1957), a prominent leader of the monarchist Hetmanite movement abroad
- Pavlo (Ukrainian: Павло) (1915–1918)
- Olena (Ukrainian: Олена) (5 July 1919 – 4 August 2014)

=== Ethnic affiliation ===
Growing up, Skoropadsky's family was well-integrated into Russian society and considered themselves to be Little Russian, or part of the wider All-Russian nation. Having spent his formative years at the Page Corps, in the heart of Imperial Russia, Skoropadsky grew enamoured with the Russian culture and language, which set him apart from many other Ukrainian political leaders of the time. In his memoirs, he would write:

Russian: Я люблю русский язык, украинцы его терпеть не могут; по крайней мере, делают вид, что не любят его; я люблю среднюю Россию, Московщину – они находят, что эта страна отвратительна; я верю в великое будущее России, если только она переустроится на новых началах, где все бы части ее в решении вопросов имели одинаковый голос и где бы не было того, как теперь, например, когда в Москве в известных кругах смотрят на Украину, как хозяин смотрит на работника; украинцы этому будущему не верят и т. д

[I love the Russian language, Ukrainians cannot stand it; or at least, they pretend to; I love central Russia, Muscovy – they find that this land is horrible; I believe in the great future of Russia, if only she could be rebuilt on new foundations, where all parts of her would have an equal voice in decision-making and where it would not be like now, when in certain Muscovite circles, Ukraine is viewed in the same way as a servant by his master; Ukrainians do not believe in this future, and so on]

— Pavlo Skoropadsky, Воспоминания. Конец 1917 г. – декабрь 1918 г.

The Abdication of Nicholas II and the rise of Ukrainian national consciousness influenced Skoropadsky's decision to embrace his Ukrainian and Cossack heritage more thoroughly. In a March 1917 letter to his wife, Skoropadsky encourages her to teach Danylo Ukrainian and says that he himself is planning to "make a Ukrainian out of myself", although Papakin notes that this might refer more to a political Ukrainian orientation, rather than ethnic identity. However, upon receiving the order from Lavr Kornilov to begin Ukrainisation of the two divisions under his command in August 1917, Skoropadsky was still initially reluctant, as he felt that it could be damaging to the war effort.

Despite being viewed as excessively Russophillic in Ukrainian nationalist circles, he would earn the derision of some Russian leaders (such as the Metropolitan of Galicia and Kyiv Antony Khrapovitsky) for being a traitor or separatist of Russia. Anton Denikin, one of the leaders of the White Movement, held the same view, as did Vasily Shulgin, a State Duma member from Kyiv.

== Honours ==
- Order of St. Anna 4th degree, 1904
- Order of St. Anna 3rd degree with swords and bow, 1904
- Order of St. Stanislaus 2nd class with swords, 1905
- Order of St Vladimir, 4th degree with swords and bow, 1905
- Golden Weapon for Bravery, 1905
- Order of St. Anne 2nd degree with swords, 1906
- Order of St Vladimir, 3rd degree, 1900
- Order of St. George, 4th class,
- Order of the Red Eagle, 1918 (Prussia)

== Legacy ==
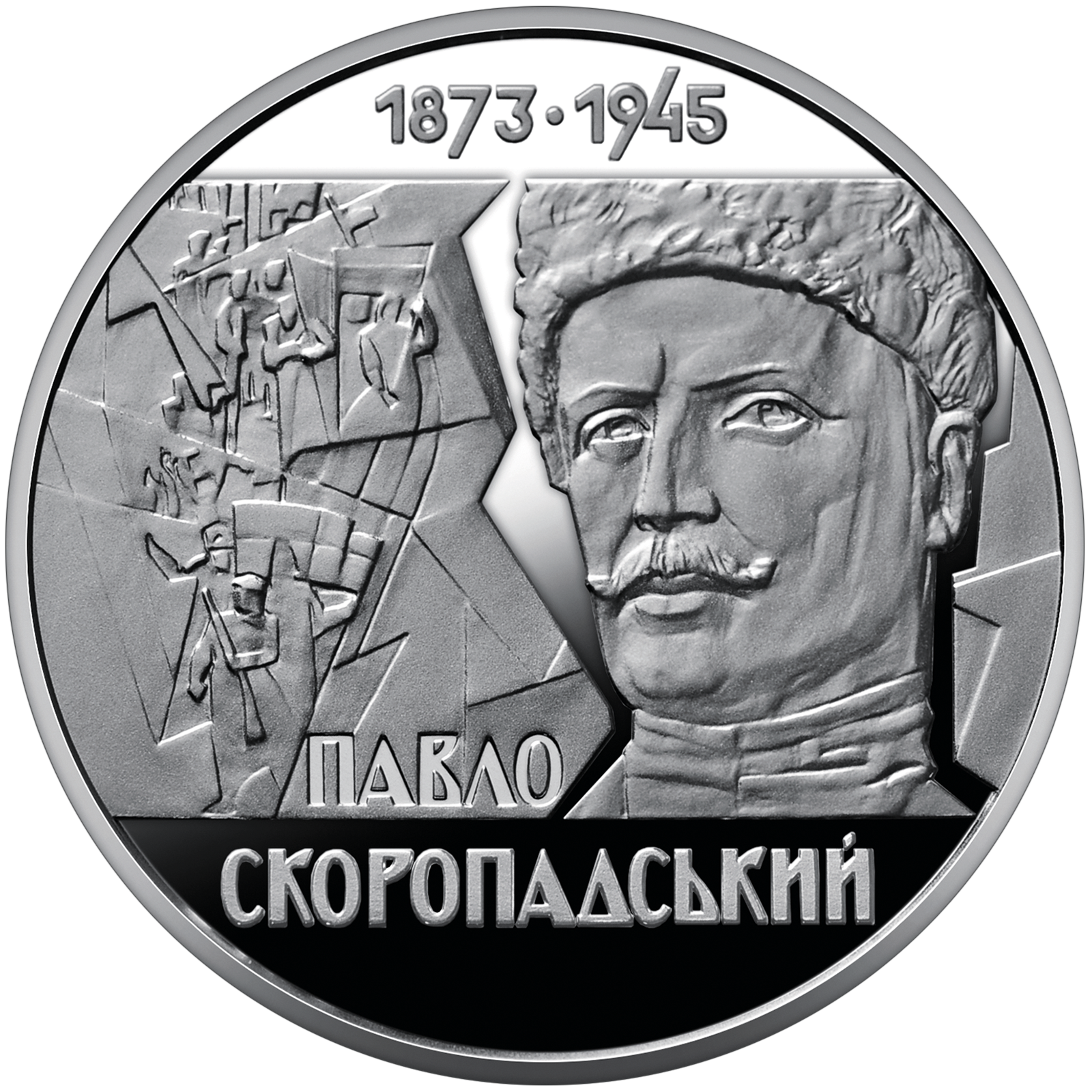
Skoropadsky memorial coin issued in 2023

In some Ukrainian cities there are streets named after Pavlo Skoropadsky.

In 2023 the National Bank of Ukraine released a 2 hryvni coin to commemorate the 150th anniversary of the birth of Pavlo Skoropadsky.

== Ancestry ==
Ancestors of Pavlo Skoropadsky

8. Mykhailo Skoropadsky
4. Ivan Skoropadsky
18. Mykola Markevych
9. Pulkheria Markevych
2. Petro Skoropadsky
5. Yelyzaveta Tarnovska
1. Pavlo Skoropadsky
6. Andriy Miklashevsky
3. Maria Miklashevska
7. Daria Olsuyeva

== Bibliography ==
- Skoropadsky, Pavlo (2020). Воспоминания. Конец 1917 г. – декабрь 1918 г. [Memories. The end of 1917 – December 1918.] (in Russian). Издательство «Фолио».
- Papakin, Heorhiy (2003). Павло Скоропадський: патріот, державотворець, людина [Pavlo Skoropadsky: patriot, statesman and man] (in Ukrainian). ISBN 966-8225-10-4.
- Pritsak, Omeljan (1955). Рід Скоропадських (Історично-ґенеалоґічна студія) [The Skoropadsky Line (Historical-genetical study)] (in Ukrainian). New York: Bulava Publishing Corporation.
- Savchenko, Victor (2008). Павло Скоропадський – Останній Гетьман України [Pavlo Skoropadsky – the last hetman of Ukraine] (in Ukrainian). ISBN 978-966-03-4058-9.
- Ott-Skoropadska, Olena (2013). Остання з роду Скоропадських [The last of the Skoropadsky line] (in Ukrainian). ISBN 978-966-8853-33-3.
- Reent, Oleksandr (2003). Скоропадський. Історичні нариси [Skoropadsky. Historical notes] (in Ukrainian). ISBN 966-7217-82-5.
- von Hagen, Mark (2005). "I love Russia and/but I want Ukraine", or How a Russian General Became Hetman of the Ukrainian State, 1917-1918.
- Hay-Nyzhnyk, Pavlo (2019). Павло Скоропадський і власний штаб гетьмана всієї України: боротьба за владу і державність [Pavlo Skoropadsky and the staff of the Hetman of all Ukraine: the fight for power and statehood] (in Ukrainian). ISBN 978-617-692-517-0.
- Mykhailova, Olha (2018). Павло Скоропадський - «Крім негідників, усі підуть за мною» [Pavlo Skoropadsky - "Besides the scoundrels, everyone will follow me"] (in Ukrainian). ISBN 978-966-922-132-2.
