= Ukrainian General Military Committee =

Ukrainian General Military Committee (Ukrainian: Український генеральний військовий комітет; Ukrayinskyi heneralnyi viyskovyi komitet) was the highest military institution in Ukrainian People's Republic established by the First All-Ukrainian Military Congress on 18 May 1917 for the purpose of governing the Ukrainian military movement and transforming the Russian military on the territory of Ukrainian lands into national military force. The committee is seen as a precursor of the Ukrainian Ministry of Defence.

The delegates of military congress decided that the committee would be subordinated to the Central Council of Ukraine rather than the Russian Provisional Government or the All-Russian General Military Command.

== Formation ==
Initially it was composed of 19 members: Symon Petliura (chairman), Volodymyr Vynnychenko, General Mykhailo Ivanov, Colonel Ivan Lutsenko, Colonel Oleksandr Pilkevych, Colonel Viktor Pavlenko, Lt.Colonel Yuriy Kapkan, Lt.Colonel Volodymyr Poplavko, Lieutenant (Poruchik) Arsen Cherniavsky, Lieutenant (Poruchik) Mykola Mikhnovsky, Ensign (Khorunzhyi) A.Pevnyi, Ensign (Khorunzhyi) Vasyl Potishko, Ensign (Khorunzhyi) Mykhailo Poloz, Ensign (Khorunzhyi) Fedir Seletsky, military administrator I.Horemyka-Krupchynsky, soldiers S.Hrazhdan and Dmytro Rovynsky, sailor Semen Pysmenyi. In June 1917 they were co-opted with General Luka Kondratovych, Colonel Oleksandr Zhukovsky, Lt.Colonel Vasyl Matiashevych, Lt.Colonel Oleksandr Slyvynsky, Captain (Sotnyk) S.Biletsky, Captain (Sotnyk) H.Hlibovsky, Lieutenant (Poruchik) Volodymyr Kedrowsky (deputy chairman), Lieutenant (Poruchik) M.Levytsky, Lieutenant (Poruchik) Petro Skrypchynsky, Soldier S.Kolos (secretary).

=== Subsequent fate of its members ===
- After realizing perspectivelessness of establishment of the Ukrainian military, Mikhnovsky resigned from the committee. Chairman of the Polubotko Military Club, Mikhnovsky forcefully tried to convince members of the Central Council of Ukraine in militarization of Ukraine through the mutiny of members of Polubotko Military Club and Polubotko Regiment.
- During the advance of Muravyov's Red Guards, Mykhailo Poloz was arrested due to cooperating with Bolsheviks and convicted to death by firing squad.
- Symon Petliura became the first minister (secretary) of Military Affairs of Ukraine, but eventually resigned in protest to policies of Vynnychenko's government.
- Since October 1917 Ivan Lutsenko became one of leaders of Free Cossacks.
- Viktor Pavlenko became a chief of the Kiev Military District and created two Serdyuk Divisions. Later he worked in creation of the Ukrainian Air Force.
- Yuri Kapkan replaced Pavlenko as a commander of all Ukrainian forces during the winter of 1917-18.
- During the World War II, Vasyl Potishko became one of organizers of the Ukrainian Supreme Liberation Council.
- In 1918 Luka Kondratovych headed the anti-Soviet Turkestan Military organization in Tashkent.
- Oleksandr Zhukovsky became a minister of Military Affairs and minister of Naval Affairs in 1918 and chief of Border Guard in 1919.
- Oleksandr Slyvynsky replaced Kapkan as a commander of all Ukrainian forces. After the resignation of Pavlo Skoropadsky, Slyvynsky resigned as a chief of General Staff.
- Members who formed the Ukrainian General Staff (General Bulawa): Oleksandr Slyvynsky (chief) and Fedir Seletsky.

== Composition ==
- Presidium - 5 members

=== Sections ===
- Propaganda-Educational and Organizational
  - Editorial-Publishing—Dmytro Rovynsky
- Inspectorate—Mykhailo Ivanov
- Mobilization and Military Communications—Volodymyr Kedrovsky
- Military Engineering—Mykola Shumytsky
- Sanitary-Medical—Dmytro Odryna
- Jurist-Consultative—M.Levytsky
- Military Training—Volodymyr Poplavko (since October 1917 - Arsen Cherniavsky)
- Chancellery—S.Kolos
- Committee Commandant and Free Cossacks Organization—A.Pevnyi
- Commission of Special Services—Luka Kondratovych

=== Representatives ===
- Headquarters in Saint Petersburg—Oleksandr Pilkevych
- General Staff in Saint Petersburg—Oleksandr Zhukovsky
- Ministry of War -- Mykhailo Poloz
- Southwestern Front headquarters—P.Skrypchynsky
- Odessa Military District headquarters—Volodymyr Poplavko
- Moscow Military District headquarters—Arsen Cherniavsky
- Naval Affairs—Semen Pysmennyi

== See also ==
- Ministry of Defence (Ukraine)
