= Battle of Vapniarka =

1919 battle in Ukraine

- Part of the Ukrainian–Soviet War
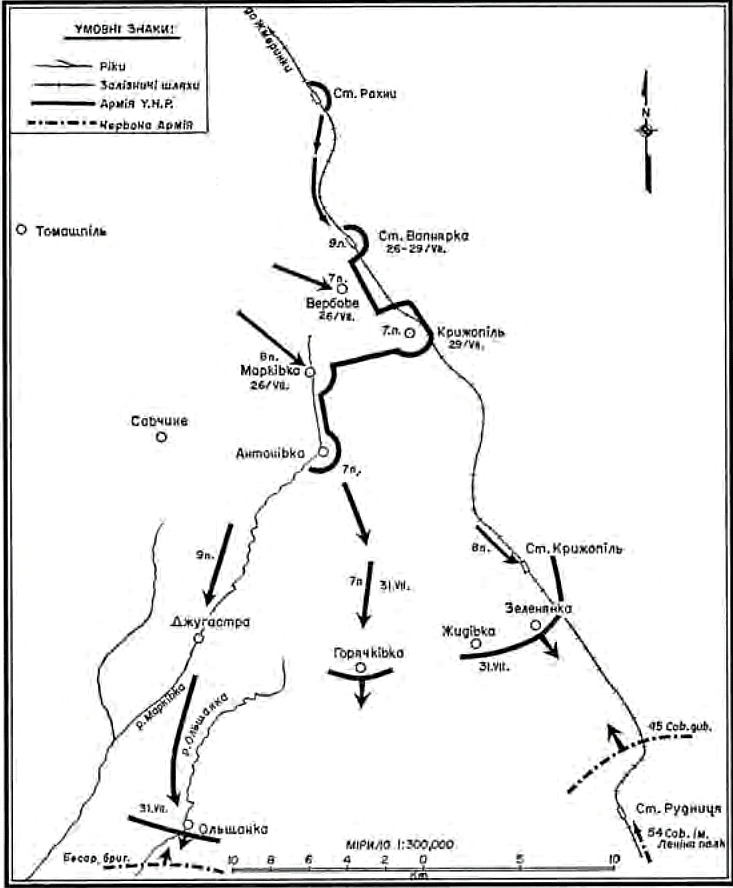
- Ukrainian advance south of Vapniarka, 28-31 July 1919
Date	26–31 July 1919
Location	Vapniarka railway station
Result	Ukrainian victory

Belligerents
Ukrainian People's Republic	Russian SFSR

Commanders and leaders
Oleksandr Udovychenko	Iona Yakir

Units involved
3rd "Iron" Rifle Division: 7th Bluecoats Regiment; 9th Rifle Regiment; 8th Black Sea Regiment	45th Rifle Division

Strength
3,000; 18 cannons	11,000; 20 cannons 5 armoured trains

The Battle of Vapniarka, also known as the Vapniarka operation was a battle that took place during the Ukrainian-Soviet war between 26 and 31 July, 1919 near the railway station Vapniarka (now Vinnytsia oblast) and ended in Ukrainian success.

== Background ==
After the Bolshevik invasion, most of Ukraine came under Soviet control. Despite the series of defeats, Ukrainian army was reorganized. On 6 of June 1919, Ukrainian forces counterattacked and captured the city of Kamyanets together with Proskuriv and Starokostiantyniv. After the battle, Kamyanets-Podilskyi became the temporary capital of the UPR, on 3 of July, Mohyliv-Podilskyi was captured.

Following the defeat in a war with Poland, Ukrainian Galician Army crossed the Zbruch river, which allowed to increase the size of UPR forces. At the end of July, the joint forces of Ukrainian People's Army and Ukrainian Galician army began an offensive with goal of capturing Kiev, which at the time was held by Bolsheviks. In order to establish a naval link for the supply of munitions, the leadership of Ukrainian People's Republic planned another offensive with the aim of capturing Odesa, with Vapniarka being an important railway node on the route towards the port city.

== Opposing forces ==
=== Ukrainian army ===
Units of the Ukrainian People's Army participating in the battle were subordinated to the 3rd Rifle Division headed by former tsarist army colonel Oleksandr Udovychenko. Udovychenko's force was an amalgam of various preceding formations, including World War I veterans from the Bluecoat Division. The division consisted of a little more than 3,000 soldiers, and suffered from a lack of cavalry forces and artillery, as well as general scarcity of weapons. The problem with munition supplies was solved with the help of equipment captured from the enemy; trophies taken from the Red Army included armoured cars and even several armoured trains.

Simultaneously with Udovychenko's offensive actions, a group of Ukrainian forces led by Tiutiunnyk and Bozhko attempted to dislodge Bolshevik troops from Zhmerynka.

=== Red Army ===
The area of Vapniarka was defended by the 45th Division under command of Iona Yakir, as well as several other units, including the 54th Regiment named after Vladimir Lenin led by notable Odesa gangster Mishka Yaponchik. The Red Army forces were well-supplied and had support of several armoured trains. Their total strength was over 10,000 soldiers.

== Battle ==
=== Prelude ===
In order to approach Vapniarka, on 16-17 July elements of the Ukrainian 8th Black Sea Regiment under command of colonel Tsarenko advanced on Red Army positions near Komarhorod. After establishing control over the village, Ukrainian troops started advancing towards Vapniarka, aiming to surround the numerically superior enemy force from three sides. On 17 July the 7th Bluecoat Regiment captured the village of Vapniarka, and on the next day established control over Kyslytske. However, the Reds eventually reestablished control over the latter settlement, attacking its civilians for alleged support of the Ukrainian side. The 8th Black Sea Regiment, meanwhile, advanced towards Antopil, and was able to capture the village after receiving support of the Bluecoats several days later.

On 22 of July, Ukrainian forces began a new offensive, as a result of which, Vapniarka and the neighbouring settlements of Tomashpil and Komarhorod were captured. However, the Bolsheviks counterattacked and recaptured the station.

=== Fighting for Vapniarka station ===
On 26 of July, Ukrainians captured the villages of Tsapivka and Kolodianka, while continuing their advance towards Vapniarka. Despite the fact that Bolshevik forces managed to temporarily halt the Ukrainian offensive, on the same day Ukrainian 7th Blue regiment captured Vapniarka station with a bold attack. During the next days, the station changed hands several times.

A key event in the battle was the Ukrainian capture of Verbova on 26 July. Left unguarded by the Bolsheviks, the village lay on a railway line to Kryzhopil, which was used to transfer Red Army units to Vapniarka. At 17:00 on the same day, Ukrainian command ordered to destroy the railway. Simultaneously, the Bluecoats started an attack on Vapniarka from the southwest, supported by an improvised armoured train created by putting a simple cannon on a railway platform. This action resulted in panic among the Bolsheviks, leading to their retreat from the station.

On the night of 27-28 of July, the Reds began a counterattack, which forced the UPA to retreat. However, on the morning of the same day the station was again recaptured by the Ukrainians. Further Bolshevik attacks on the station continued until July 31 and were unsuccessful.

== Aftermath ==
The victory at Vapniarka was a great success for the Ukrainian army, as it managed to significantly defeat the 45th Rifle division and capture the station, which was a strategically important point of the Ukrainian summer campaign. The 3rd Ukrainian division got its nickname "Iron Division" after the capture of Vapniarka due to their bravery that was shown during the battle.
