= Vasyl Bozhenko =

Ukrainian Red Army commander

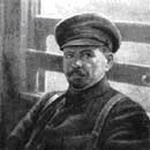
- Native name: Василь Назарович Боженко
- Born: 1867/1869/1871; Berezhynka, Kherson Governorate, Russian Empire (now Kirovohrad Oblast, Ukraine)
- Died: 21 August 1919 (aged 47–52) Slavuta, Soviet Ukraine (now Khmelnytsky Oblast, Ukraine)
- Allegiance: Russian Empire; Ukrainian SSR
- Branch: Imperial Russian Army; Red Guards; Red Army
- Service years: 1904–1905; 1917–1919
- Commands: 2nd Ukrainian Soviet (Tarashcha) Regiment; 44th Rifle Brigade
- Conflicts: Russo-Japanese War; Ukrainian-Soviet War; Kiev Bolshevik Uprising; Kiev Arsenal January Uprising; Battle of Kiev (January 1919)

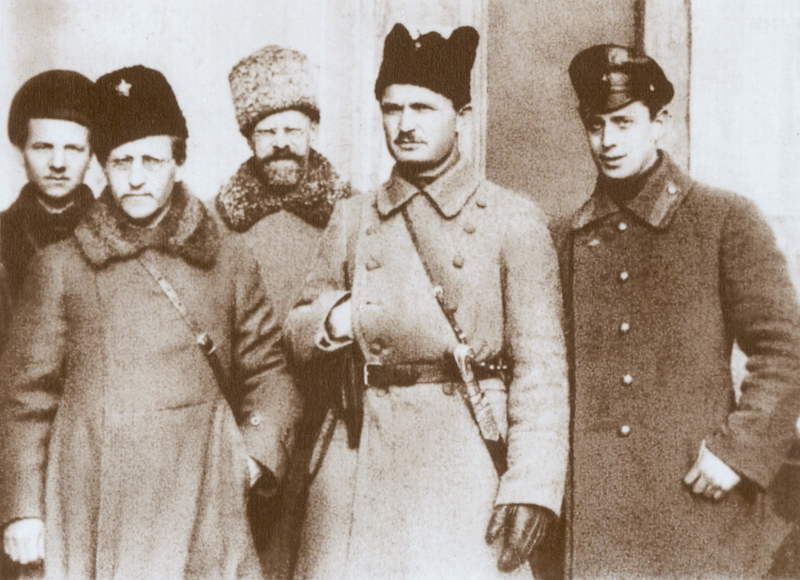
Bozhenko (middle) with Antonov-Ovseenko (second from left) in 1919

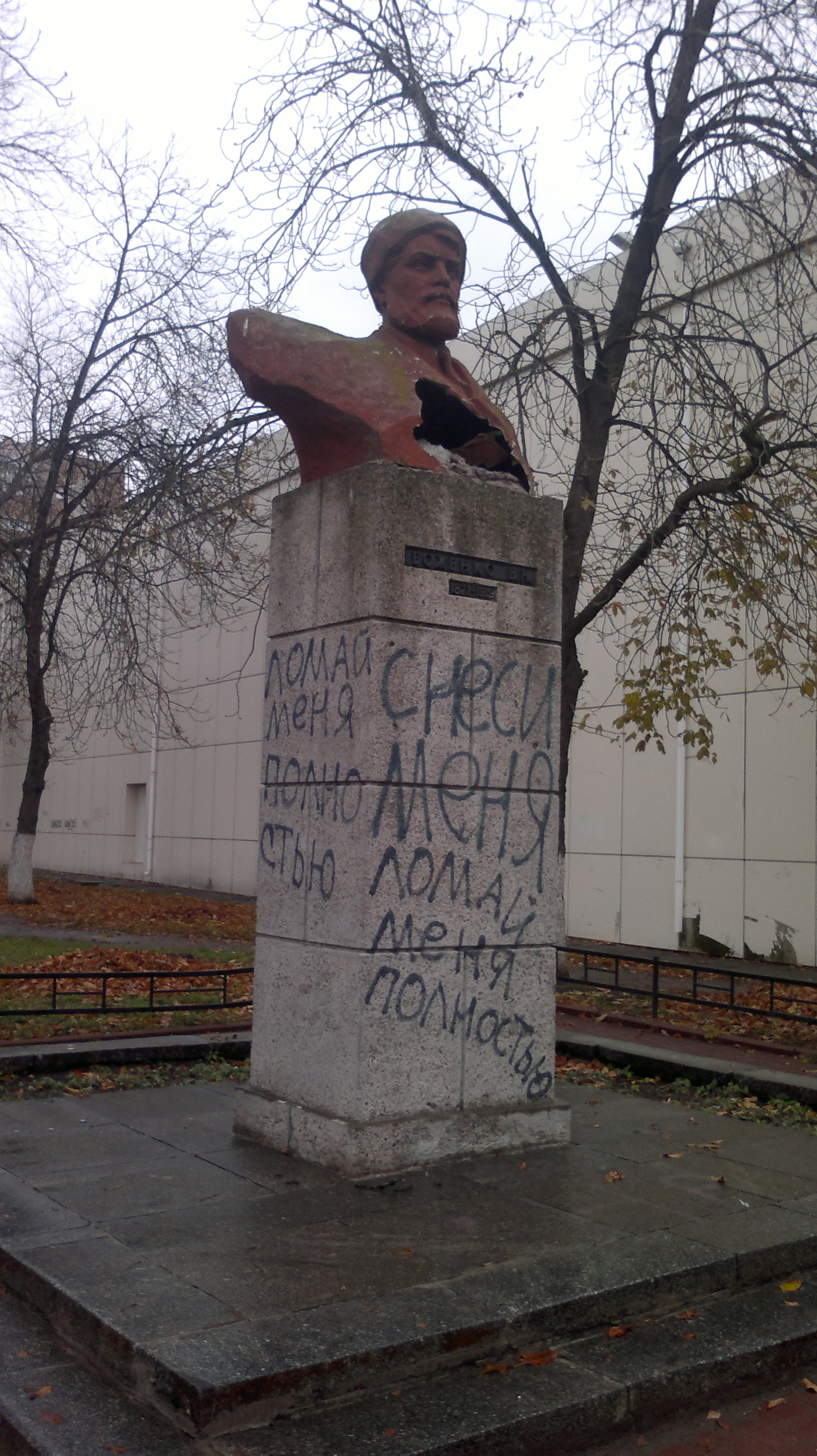
Monument to Bozhenko in Kyiv shortly before its demolition in 2015

Vasyl Nazarovych Bozhenko (Ukrainian: Василь Назарович Боженко; between 1867 and 1871–21 August 1919) was a commander of Bolshevik partisans and regular Red Army units during the Soviet-Ukrainian War. He was a subordinate of Mykola Shchors in the fight against the Ukrainian People's Army in 1918–1919.

== Biography ==
Bozhenko's exact birth date is unknown, with various sources claiming 1867, 1869 or 1871 to be his birth year. He was born to a peasant family in Berezhynka, Kherson Governorate (now part of Kropyvnytskyi Raion, Kirovohrad Oblast). In 1904–1905 he fought in the rows of Russian Imperial Army during the Russo-Japanese War, and reached the rank of feldwebel. During the First Russian Revolution, in 1907 Bozhenko was arrested for revolutionary activities and sentenced to three years of imprisonment. After his liberation, in 1915–1917 he worked as a joiner at a mechanical workshop in Kyiv, and headed the city's woodworkers' trade union.

Following the February Revolution, in March 1917 Bozhenko joined the Bolshevik Party, and was elected member of the Kyiv Council of Workers' and Soldiers' Delegates, and in October of the same year became a member of its executive committee. During the Kyiv Bolshevik Uprising and Kyiv Arsenal January Uprising he commanded Red Guard units fighting against forces of the Ukrainian People's Republic. Following the 1918 Central Powers occupation of Ukraine Bozhenko organized partisan units fighting the German and Austrian forces and Pavlo Skoropadsky's Hetmanate in the neutral zone.

In late 1918 Bozhenko was appointed commander of the Tarashcha Regiment subordinate to the 1st Ukrainian Insurgent Division in Unecha (modern Bryansk Oblast). That unit was later reorganized into the 2nd Ukrainian Soviet Regiment, part of the 1st Ukrainian Soviet Division of the Ukrainian Front. On 5 February 1919 Bozhenko's unit took part in the capture of Kyiv from the Directorate of Ukraine. For this achievement the division was awarded an honorary Red Flag, and Bozhenko himself received personal weapons from the All-Ukrainian Central Executive Committee.

In April 1919 Bozhenko was appointed commander of the 2nd brigade as part of 1st Ukrainian Soviet Division. In August 1919 he became commander of the 44th Rifle Brigade. Later during that month, Bozhenko died of an unknown illness in Slavuta. It is speculated, that he could have been poisoned, either by Soviet agents, who suspected him of preparing to launch a mutiny against own superiors, or by Symon Petliura's agents. Bozhenko's body was buried in a desecrated crypt in Zhytomyr, but soon reportedly got stolen from the grave.

== Personal life ==
According to Vladimir Antonov-Ovseenko, Bozhenko produced the impression of a typical otaman, poorly disciplined in relation to his superiors, but at the same time caring and demanding for his subordinates. He identified himself as Little Russian and conversed in Ukrainian language or Surzhyk. Bozhenko was greatly respected by his soldiers, who called him bat'ko ("father") according to Cossack tradition.

Bozhenko's wife Yelyzaveta Ivanivna was a fellow revolutionary, who enjoyed his great trust. In April 1919, when Bozhenko received news of his unit's soldiers being harassed by local Bolshevik authorities in Kyiv, he sent her to the city in order to clarify the situation. However, several days later Yelyzaveta was found dead in a morgue, reportedly murdered by a group of people who had presented themselves as Cheka agents. Infuriated, Bozhenko threatened to march with his unit from the frontline near Novohrad-Volynskyi and capture Kyiv, but the conflict was eventually mediated by his superior Mykola Shchors.

== Legacy ==
Unlike Mykola Shchors, Bozhenko was mostly ignored by Soviet propaganda, and his few depictions in the media following his death frequently had a caricature and satirical tone. During the Soviet period, a museum dedicated to Bozhenko existed, but was closed down after 1991.

A street named after Bozhenko existed in Kyiv, but was renamed in 2012 after famous painter Kazimir Malevich.
