= Battle of Kiev (January 1919) =

January 1919 offensive in the Ukrainian-Soviet War

Coordinates: 50.40°N 30.54°E

Battle of Kyiv (January 1919)
- Part of the 1919 Soviet invasion of Ukraine
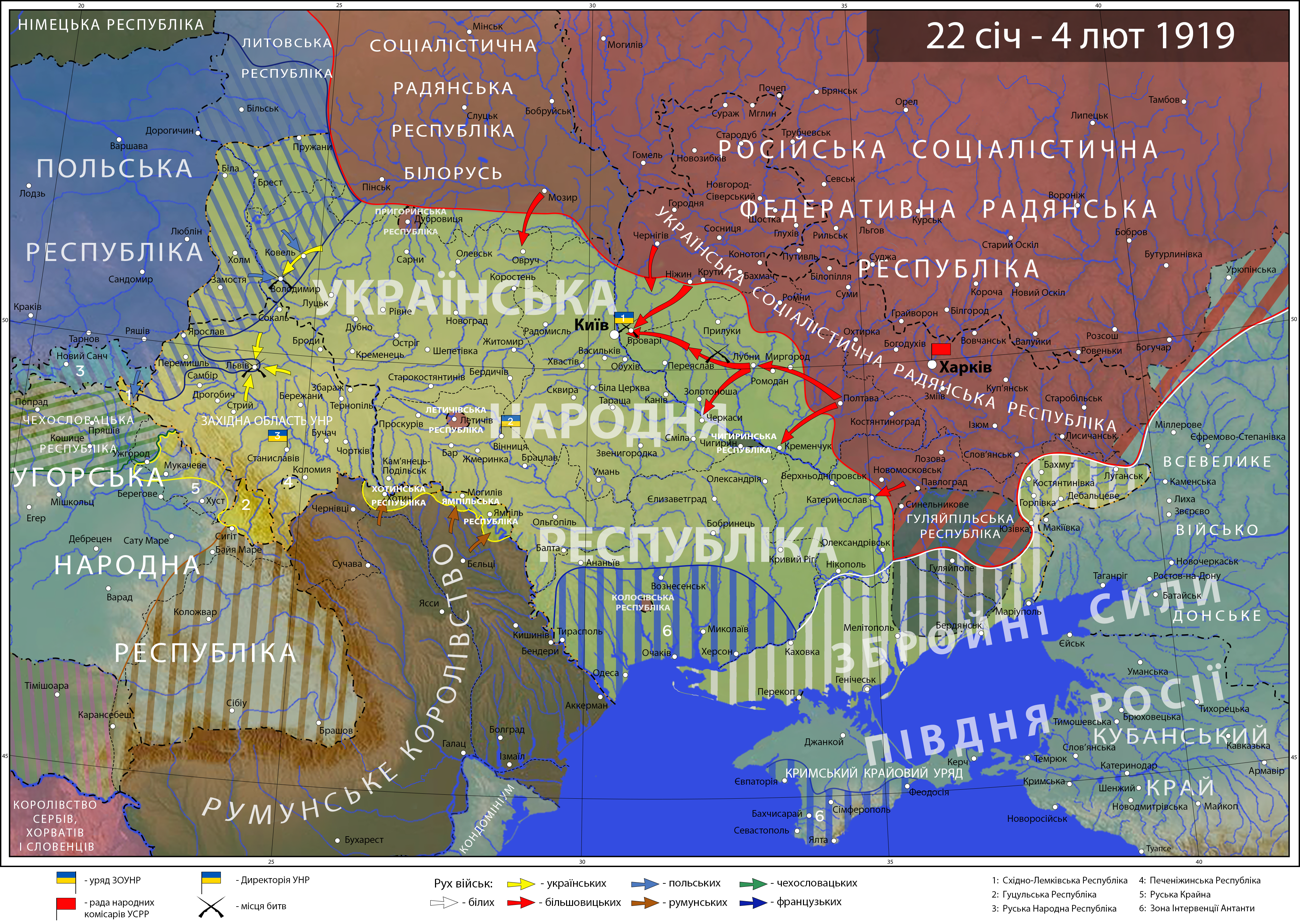
- Bolshevik advance on Kyiv in January 1919
Date	18 January – 5 February 1919
Location	Kyiv, Ukraine
Result	Soviet victory

Belligerents
Ukrainian SSR (nominally); Russian SFSR (de-facto)	Ukrainian People's Republic

Commanders and leaders
Vladimir Antonov-Ovseyenko; Nikolay Shchors	Symon Petliura; Roman Sushko

Units involved
Ukrainian Front: 1st Ukrainian Soviet Army	Ukrainian People's Army: Sich Riflemen

The Battle of Kyiv started in January 1919 and was one of a number of battles fought over the capital of Ukraine during the Russian Civil War and Ukrainian–Soviet War. It involved an offensive by elements of the Ukrainian Front of the Red Army to capture Kyiv. The battle was a part of the General Offensive of the Ukrainian Front.

== Prelude ==
On 12 December 1918 Red Army troops invaded Ukrainian territory, occupying Novhorod-Siverskyi and Shostka. On 21 December the Bolsheviks started their advance on Kharkiv, and on 24 December the People's Commissariat for Foreign Affairs of the Russian SFSR declared its recognition of the Ukrainian People's Republic following the Treaty of Brest null and void. At the same time, Bolshevik foreign minister Georgy Chicherin denied the presence of Russian troops in Ukrainian territory, claiming Red Army troops to be subordinate to the "entirely independent" Soviet Ukrainian government.

== Battle ==
In mid-January 1919 Ukrainian People's Republic issued an official declaration of war against Soviet Russia. On 22 January, Nizhyn was occupied. On 24 January, the Red Army approached Brovary and occupied the city after fierce fighting. By the end of January the Red Army had occupied most of Left-bank Ukraine.

Starting from 1 February Ukrainian troops performed an evacuation from Kyiv. Sich Riflemen commander Yevhen Konovalets left the city on 3 February, transferring command over the defending forces to Roman Sushko. On 4 February a revolutionary committee was established in Kyiv by Bolsheviks, Mensheviks and Left SRs.

By 5 February, Ukrainian troops had been withdrawn from the city. On the same day, a delegation of the City duma arrived to the Red Army headquarters in Brovary, but was denied participation in negotiations. Mass plundering of property spread around the city. At 1 PM the Red Army started entering Kyiv, welcomed by groups of the city's workers.

== Aftermath ==
The Soviet offensive forced the premature closure of the Labour Congress of Ukraine, which on 22 January 1919 had adopted the Unification Act of Ukrainian People's Republic and West Ukrainian People's Republic. After the occupation, the government of Soviet Ukraine moved into the city. The new regime closed down many local newspapers, leaving the population in an information vacuum. On 8 February the City Duma was dissolved, and the City Council was reelected.

On 7 February the Bolshevik executive committee organized the Extraordinary Commission tasked with eliminating "counterrevolutionaries". The office of the organization was located in baron Shteingel's house in Yaroslaviv Val, with the nearby garden serving as a site of executions. Later the commission's office was moved to Lypky, and it was headed by Martin Latsis. Numerous people in Kyiv were executed by the Bolshevik regime during the following months.
