= Manifesto to the Ukrainian people with ultimate demands to the Ukrainian Rada =

Ultimatum from Soviet Russia to Ukraine (1917)

Manifesto to the Ukrainian people with ultimate demands to the Ukrainian Rada (pre-reform Russian: Манифестъ къ украинскому народу съ ультимативными требованіями къ Центральной раде) is an official document of the Council of People's Commissars of the Russian Soviet Federative Socialist Republic, prepared by Chairman of the Council of People's Commissars Vladimir Lenin, People's Commissar for Foreign Affairs Leon Trotsky, People's Commissar of Nationalities Joseph Stalin.

It was adopted on December 16 (3), 1917 at a meeting of the People's Commissars in Moscow and submitted to the Central Rada in Kyiv on December 17 (4).

== Preliminary actions ==
Concerning the disorganization of the army: Order No. 1 of the Petrograd Council of Workers 'and Peasants' Deputies of March 1, 1917. (Decree 9 (22) November)

== Russian ultimatum ==
The ultimatum of the Council of People's Commissars to the Ukrainian Central Rada is an ultimatum sent by the Bolshevik government of Russia (Council of People's Commissars) to the representative body of the Ukrainian People's Republic, the Central Council of Ukraine or Central Rada. It was written with the signature of Vladimir Lenin and Leo Trotsky, and sent to Kyiv on 17 [O.S. 1917] December. The document demanded that the Ukrainian government provide unconditional assistance to the Bolsheviks in Ukraine. It was rejected on 20 [O.S. 1917] December by the Central Council of Ukraine, a motion signed by Volodymyr Vynnychenko and Symon Petliura. This became a cause for the Soviet–Ukrainian War.

The Central Council of Ukraine was accused of "unheard of betrayal of the revolution." The ultimatum had the following demands for the Ukrainians:

1. to maintain a joint front with Russia, to abandon the creation of a separate Ukrainian front.
2. not to allow military units from the front to enter the Don region and other regions where power has been established, hostile to the Bolshevik Council of People's Commissars of Russia.
3. allow Bolshevik troops on the Southern Front to fight Alexey Kaledin.
4. to stop the disarmament of Bolshevik regiments and Red Guard units in Ukraine.

The Ukrainians were given 48 hours to answer. In case of refusal, the Council of People's Commissars of Russia would consider the Central Council of Ukraine in a state of open war against the Soviet authorities in Russia and Ukraine.

== Ukrainian response ==
20 [O.S. 1917] December the General Secretariat sent a reply signed by Volodymyr Vynnychenko and Symon Petliura. It stated that:

1. The Council of People's Commissars of Russia had no right to interfere in the internal affairs of Ukraine.
2. Ukraine would not allow anarchy and devastation as in Russia.
3. The disarmament of Bolshevik units was necessary to avoid civil war.
4. Russian Bolshevik units must realize their national aspirations in Russia, not Ukraine.
5. The disarmament of Bolshevik units would continue if these units threaten the Ukrainian authorities.
6. Ukrainian units hold only their part of the front, which is already disorganized.
7. Ukraine recognizes the right of nations to self-determination and political pluralism, so it would allow troops to the Don and Kuban.
8. Ukraine opposes Bolshevik methods of establishing power.

== Sources ==
- Бойко О. Д.. Маніфест до українського народу з ультимативними вимогами до Української Ради // Енциклопедія історії України : у 10 т. / редкол. : В. А. Смолій (голова) та ін. ; Інститут історії України НАН України. — К. : Наук. думка, 2009. — Т. 6 : Ла — Мі. — С. 495. — 784 с. : іл. — ISBN 978-966-00-1028-4.
- Декреты Советской власти. Т. I. 25 октября 1917 г. — 16 марта 1918 г. / Ин-т марксизма-ленинизма при ЦК КПСС, Ин-т истории акад. наук СССР.— М.: Политиздат, 1957.— С. 174–180.
- Конституанта «Конфлікт революцій. Центральна Українська Рада та Рада Народних Комісарів („Генеральський“ і Народний Секретаріат УНР) 1917—1918»
- Ленин В. И. Сочинения / Изд-е третье, перепечат. без изменений со второго, исправл. и дополнен. изд-я. Под ред.: Н. И. Бухарина, В. М. Молотова, М. А. Савельева.— М.: Партиздат ЦК ВКП(б), 1935.— Том XXII. 1917–1918.— С. 593, 591–592.
- Летопись революции. Журнал по истории КП(б)У и Октябрьской революции на Украине.- 1925, No. 2 (11), март - апрель.
- Манифест к украинскому народу с ультимативными требованиями к Украинской раде.— Российский государственный архив социально-политической истории.— Ф. 2. Оп. 1. Д. 4880. Л. 1–3.— Подлинник. Машинописный текст, подписи – автографы В. И. Ленина и Л. Д. Троцкого, резолюция – автограф Л. Д. Троцкого.
- Михутина, И. В. Украинский Брестский мир. Путь выхода России из первой мировой войны и анатомия конфликта между Совнаркомом РСФСР и правительством Украинской Центральной рады М. «Европа», 2007, ISBN 978-5-9739-0090-8 (рос.)
- Романчук О. Ультиматум. Хроніка одного конфлікту між Раднаркомом РРФСР і Центральною Радою. — Київ, 1990.
- В. Ф. Солдатенко. Маніфест до українського народу з ультимативними вимогами до Української Ради // Українська дипломатична енциклопедія: У 2-х т./Редкол.:Л. В. Губерський (голова) та ін. — К.:Знання України, 2004 — Т.2 — 812с. ISBN 966-316-045-4
- Українська Центральна Рада: документи і матеріали. У 2 т. / НАН України, Ін-т історії України, Центр. держ. архів вищ. органів влади і упр. України.- Т. 1: 4 березня — 9 грудня 1917 р. / Упорядники: В. Ф. Верстюк (керівник), О. Д. Бойко, Ю. М. Гамрецький та ін.; редкол.: В. А. Смолій (відп. ред.) та ін.— Київ: Наук. думка, 1996.— 587, [2] c.(Пам'ятки історії України. Сер. V. Джерела новітньої історії)
