= 1919 Soviet invasion of Ukraine =

Part of Ukrainian–Soviet War (1917–1921)

- Part of the Ukrainian–Soviet War, Soviet westward offensive of 1918-1919, and Russian Civil War
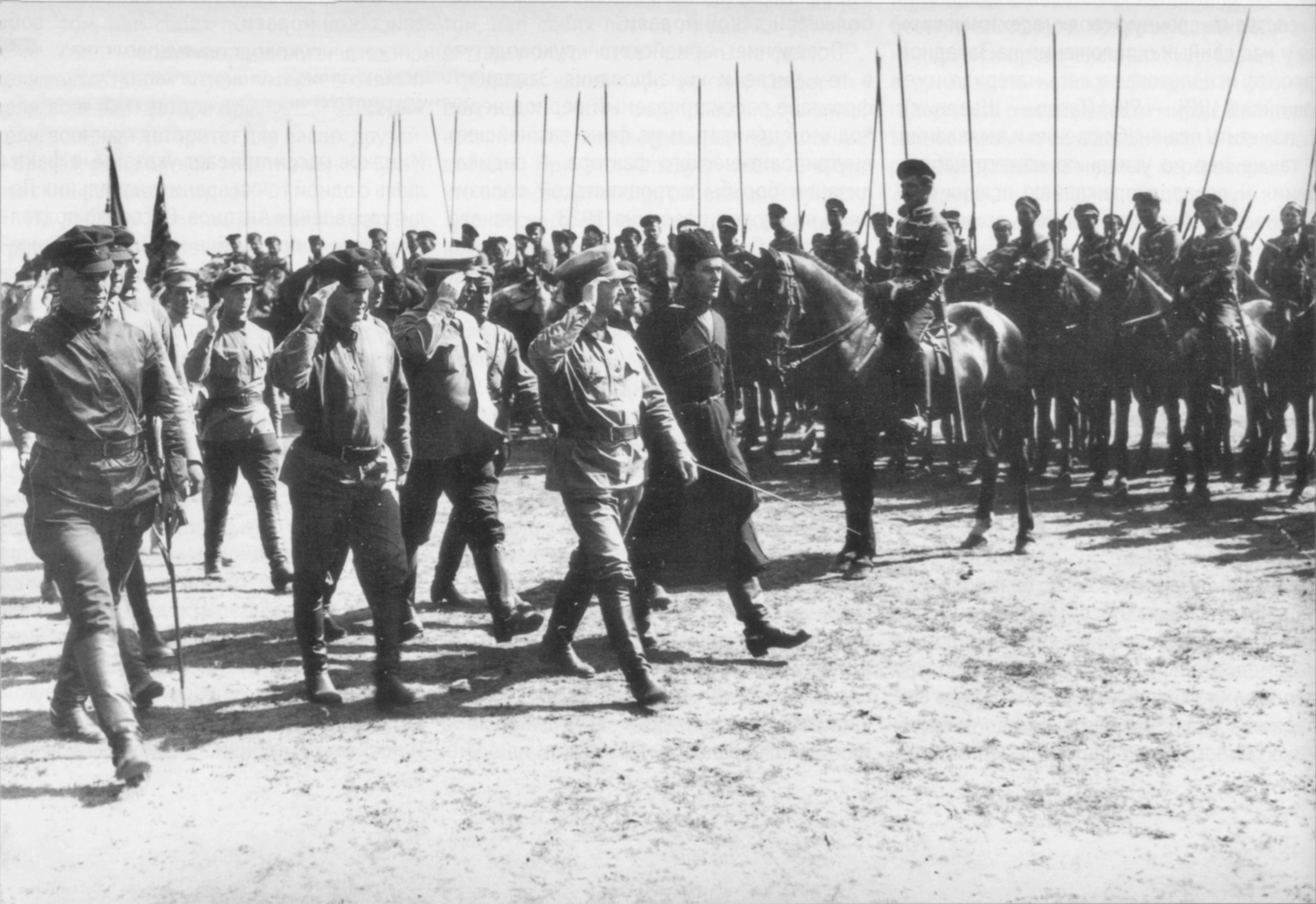
- Leon Trotsky inspects units of the Red Army in Kharkiv, which was occupied by the Russian Bolsheviks, June 1919.
Date	2 January – 31 August 1919
Location	Ukraine
Result	Soviet defeat; Hryhorivshchyna and Makhnovshchyna rebel against Soviet command; Whites with the help from Allies win the battle for the Donbas, successfully capture Kyiv and advance on Moscow; Poland occupies Volhynia and Galicia (Eastern Lesser Poland); Ukrainian Front disbanded and integrated into the Western and Southern Fronts

Belligerents
Soviets: Russian SFSR; Ukrainian SSR; Crimean SSR; Partisans: Green Army (Note: Allied with the Bolsheviks until February, when it rebelled.); Hryhorivshchyna (Note: Part of the 3rd Ukrainian Soviet Army until May, when it launched an anti-Bolshevik uprising in Kherson.); Makhnovshchyna (Note: Part of the 2nd Ukrainian Soviet Army until June, when it resigned its position.)	Nationalists: Ukrainian People's Republic; West Ukrainian People's Republic; Independent Medvyn Republic; Kholodny Yar Republic	White movement: South Russia; Crimea; Don Republic; Allies: France; (Kingdom of Greece) Greece; Poland

Commanders and leaders
Vladimir Antonov-Ovseenko; Vasily Glagolev; Pavel Dybenko; Ivan Dubovoy; Mykola Shchors; Yuriy Kotsiubynsky; Efim Shchadenko; Andrei Bubnov; Nestor Makhno; Nykyfor Hryhoriv; Danylo Terpylo	Symon Petliura; Petro Bolbochan (executed); Yevhen Konovalets; Oleksandr Udovychenko; Yuriy Tyutyunnyk; Mykhailo Omelianovych-Pavlenko	Anton Denikin; Nikolai Bredov; Pyotr Krasnov Antoni Listowski; Wacław Iwaszkiewicz

Units involved
Ukrainian Front: 1st Ukrainian Soviet Army; 2nd Ukrainian Soviet Army; 3rd Ukrainian Soviet Army; Crimean Soviet Army	Ukrainian People's Army; Ukrainian Galician Army	Armed Forces of South Russia: Volunteer Army; Don Army; Polish Armed Forces: Volhynian Front; Polesie Front; Galician Front

Strength
50,000: 14,000 infantry; 1,400 cavalry; 20 artillery guns; 139 machine guns	20,000	

The Soviet invasion of Ukraine was a major offensive by the Ukrainian Front of the Red Army against the Ukrainian People's Republic (UPR) during the Soviet–Ukrainian War. The invasion was first planned in November 1918, after the Council of People's Commissars of the Russian Soviet Federative Socialist Republic annulled the Treaty of Brest-Litovsk, and was launched in the first days of January 1919 with the occupation of Kharkiv. Its aim was to join Ukraine to the RSFSR, as the country was of significant economic, demographic and strategic importance for the Bolsheviks. In the longer term, the capture of the Black Sea coast was to prevent an intervention by the Allies in support of the Volunteer Army. Finally, the Bolsheviks intended to extend the area they control as far as possible to the west, in order to be able to support the other revolutionary movements in Europe.

In the first days of January 1919, by joining forces with local workers' units, the troops of the 1st Ukrainian Soviet Division took Kharkiv, which was announced as the seat of the Provisional Workers' and Peasants' Government of Ukraine. Then they quickly captured most of northern and eastern Ukraine, and on 5 February 1919, they occupied Kyiv. The Directorate of Ukraine moved to Vinnytsia, then to Kamianets-Podilskyi. By spring, the Red Army had reached the Zbruch and repelled a counteroffensive by the Ukrainian People's Army (UPA) that threatened Kyiv.

The introduction of the policy of war communism and the requisitioning of food for the needs of the cities quickly alienated a significant part of the Ukrainian peasantry from Bolshevik rule. The outbreak of a number of local uprisings, and in May 1919, the rebellion of the 20,000-strong forces of Nykyfor Hryhoriv, prevented the Red Army from finally destroying the UPA and marching west towards Bessarabia and Hungary. At the end of June, the Red Army suffered a series of defeats in clashes with the Volunteer Army in Donbas, losing Katerynoslav and Poltava by the end of June 1919, as well as those territories captured in the course of operations against Mykolaiv and Odesa. In August, the Red Army also succumbed to the offensive of the combined forces of the Ukrainian People's Army and the Ukrainian Galician Army. On 31 August, Kyiv was captured, first by the Ukrainian People's Army, and then, after their withdrawal from the city, by the Volunteer Army.

== Planning ==
On 12 November 1918, at the direct command of the Council of People's Commissars, the Revolutionary Military Council of the Russian SFSR, headed by Leon Trotsky, dismissed Vladimir Antonov-Ovseenko from the Ural Front and ordered him to prepare an offensive in the direction of Ukraine within ten days. The Ukrainian Revolutionary Military Council was immediately established, including Antonov-Ovseenko, Joseph Stalin, Volodymyr Zatonsky and Georgy Pyatakov. Over the next two days, Antonov-Ovseenko developed an offensive plan. It was based on the assumption that, in the first place, the Bolshevik forces should seize cities, industrial centers, ports, and railway junctions, which would provide the necessary resources and guarantee the possibility of gaining support from the workers. In the first move, Antonov-Ovseenko planned to attack Kharkiv, which would then become the base for the march to Donbas. The second step was to capture Kyiv, and the third step was to capture southern Ukraine and the Black Sea coast, including the key centers of Mykolaiv and Odesa.

As the commander-in-chief of the Red Army Jukums Vācietis adopted the Antonov-Ovseenko plan without amendments, he decided that he would receive in the course of operations all the necessary replenishment (including armored trains) and supplies. In particular, the commander of the Ukrainian Front expected that he would have at his disposal the Reserve Army under the command of Vasily Glagolev. Vacietis, however, assigned him completely different tasks - participation in the defense of Voronezh against Pyotr Krasnov's Don Army and Anton Denikin's Volunteer Army. This was in line with Vladimir Lenin's expectations - while Trotsky was convinced that the seizure of Ukraine should be a priority for the Red Army, the chairman of the Council of People's Commissars considered it more important to repel direct threats by the White movement to the Southern and Eastern Fronts. An additional source of conflicts between Vacietis and the Ukrainian Revolutionary-Military Council was the conviction of Stalin, Zatonsky and Pyatakov that they were performing a task of special importance, independent of other operations conducted by the Southern Front.

At the disposal of Antonov-Ovseenko were initially the 1st and 2nd Ukrainian Soviet Divisions, as well as the 9th division, to which new volunteers were constantly arriving, but which needed urgent additions to hardware and supplies. The two Soviet Ukrainian divisions, formed in mid-1918 by the Ukrainian Bolsheviks in order to fight the government of Pavlo Skoropadskyi and the Central Powers, did not have high combat value. Many volunteers who joined them during the formation intended to fight only in their local area and deserted when the fighting moved to other regions.

On 20 November, Antonov-Ovseenko directed orders both to the line units of the Red Army and to irregular units in Ukraine that were participating in the anti-Hetman uprising and recognizing, at least formally, the sovereignty of the All-Ukrainian Central Military-Revolutionary Committee. He ordered the revolutionary troops in Homiel to maintain control of the city in order to prevent anti-Bolshevik forces from moving from Kyiv towards Kursk and Bryansk. Those operating in the regions of Katerynoslav and Kharkiv were ordered to initiate local revolts, take control of smaller towns in order to facilitate the Red Army's march south, help in the capture of Kharkiv and, in the longer term, Mykolaiv. Bolshevik supporters in northern Donbas were called on to organize guerrillas and take control of the region, and those who were in Crimea - to prepare to repel possible Allied intervention on the peninsula. In November 1918, a wave of strikes broke out in cities in eastern Ukraine and partisan troops also operated outside the cities. Meanwhile, on 21 November, Vacietis ordered Antonov-Ovseenko to focus on the expansion and training of troops and to set up a strike group that would attack the forces of Pyotr Krasnov at Millerovo. Troops of the Don Cossacks, with the consent of the retreating Germans, took control of the Donbas from them.

The commander of the Ukrainian Front decided to ignore the orders of the high command, offended by the tone and wording contained in the Vacietis directives. Having learned about the landing of the first Allied ships in Odesa, Antonov-Ovseenko decided to lead the offensive according to his own concept. At the same time, Pyatakov and Zatonsky began to form a Bolshevik government for Ukraine. Although in October 1918, the Bolshevik government had concluded an agreement with the Ukrainian socialist leader Volodymyr Vynnychenko, under which it was not to interfere in the internal affairs of the Ukrainian People's Republic, in exchange for consent to the legal operation of the communist party within its borders. However, it was decided to undertake military intervention. On 28 November 1918, the Provisional Workers' and Peasants' Government of Ukraine was established in Kursk.

== Invasion ==
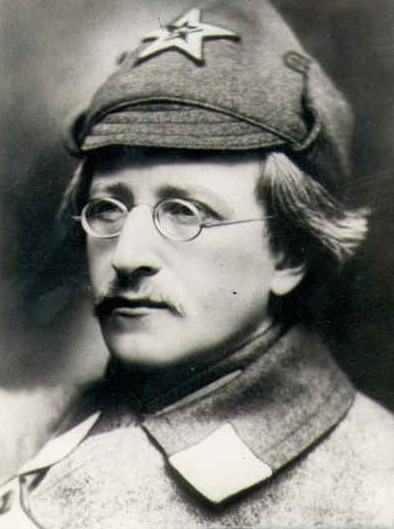
Vladimir Antonov-Ovseenko, commander-in-chief of the Ukrainian Front during the Soviet invasion.

=== Kharkiv offensive ===
In December 1918, the Ukrainian Soviet divisions were put at the disposal of Antonov-Ovseenko. Numbering approximately 5,000 soldiers each, the divisions were still not full-fledged regular formations. They consisted of undisciplined, largely independent departments. Their commanders included both ideological communists and ordinary peasants. One-third of the red soldiers and guerrillas had no weapons at all. Before the start of military operations, Antonov-Ovseenko relieved the most disgraced commanders from command, but he never gained complete control over the units that made up his front.

Further disputes between Antonov-Ovseenko and Vacietis concerning competences and tactics lasted almost throughout December 1918. Finally, on 2 January 1919, Antonov-Ovseenko made a decision on his own to start the march to Kharkiv, having learned that the last German units were withdrawing from the city and that the Bolshevik workers' units were getting ready to start an armed uprising. On 3 January 1919, the 1st Ukrainian Soviet Division entered Kharkiv. The next day, the Ukrainian Front was formally established with Antonov-Ovseenko as the commander. The Reserve Army was attached to the Front, and Vasily Glagolev was appointed as its chief of staff. A significant part of the partisan peasant units in Ukraine, which had previously fought against the Germans and sympathized with Petliura, defected to the Soviet side, under the influence of Bolshevik agitation. The urban proletariat of non-Ukrainian origin also joined the fight on the side of the Red Army.

=== March on Poltava, Katerynoslav and Kyiv ===
After the capture of Kharkiv, the offensive of the Ukrainian Front significantly accelerated. On 12 January 1919, the Red Army captured Chernihiv and, on 20 January, it successfully captured Poltava after a sixteen-day battle for the city. Units of the 2nd Ukrainian Soviet Division, led by Pavel Dybenko, entered Katerynoslav, which the Petliurists and Makhnovists had been fighting fiercely over. On 18 January 1919, Antonov-Ovseenko, who moved his quarters from Kursk to Chernihiv, accelerated the preparations for the march to Kyiv. He expected that the Allies who landed in Odesa and Crimea also intended to launch an offensive in the same direction, in support of Anton Denikin's Volunteer Army. However, the negotiations of the Directorate with the French regarding active military aid ended with the French refusing.

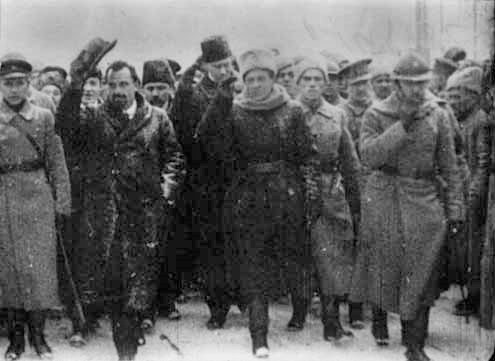
Symon Petliura (center), commander-in-chief of the Ukrainian People's Army, and Volodymyr Vynnychenko (left), leader of the Ukrainian Social Democratic Labour Party.

In the face of the invasion, treating the Red Army's march as an expression of Russian imperialism, Vynnychenko's Ukrainian socialists supported the defense of the country's independence. However, it turned out to be impossible to successfully repel the march of the Ukrainian Front, as the forces loyal to the Directorate were dwindling with each passing day. The Ukrainian national movement did not have a broad social base, being the domain of mainly a narrow intelligentsia. In addition, the Directorate was weakened by internal disputes between nationalists and socialists. At the end of January, only 21,000 soldiers remained loyal to the Ukrainian government. On 23 January, Symon Petliura began the evacuation of military personnel from the capital to avoid a battle, the outcome of which would be a foregone conclusion.

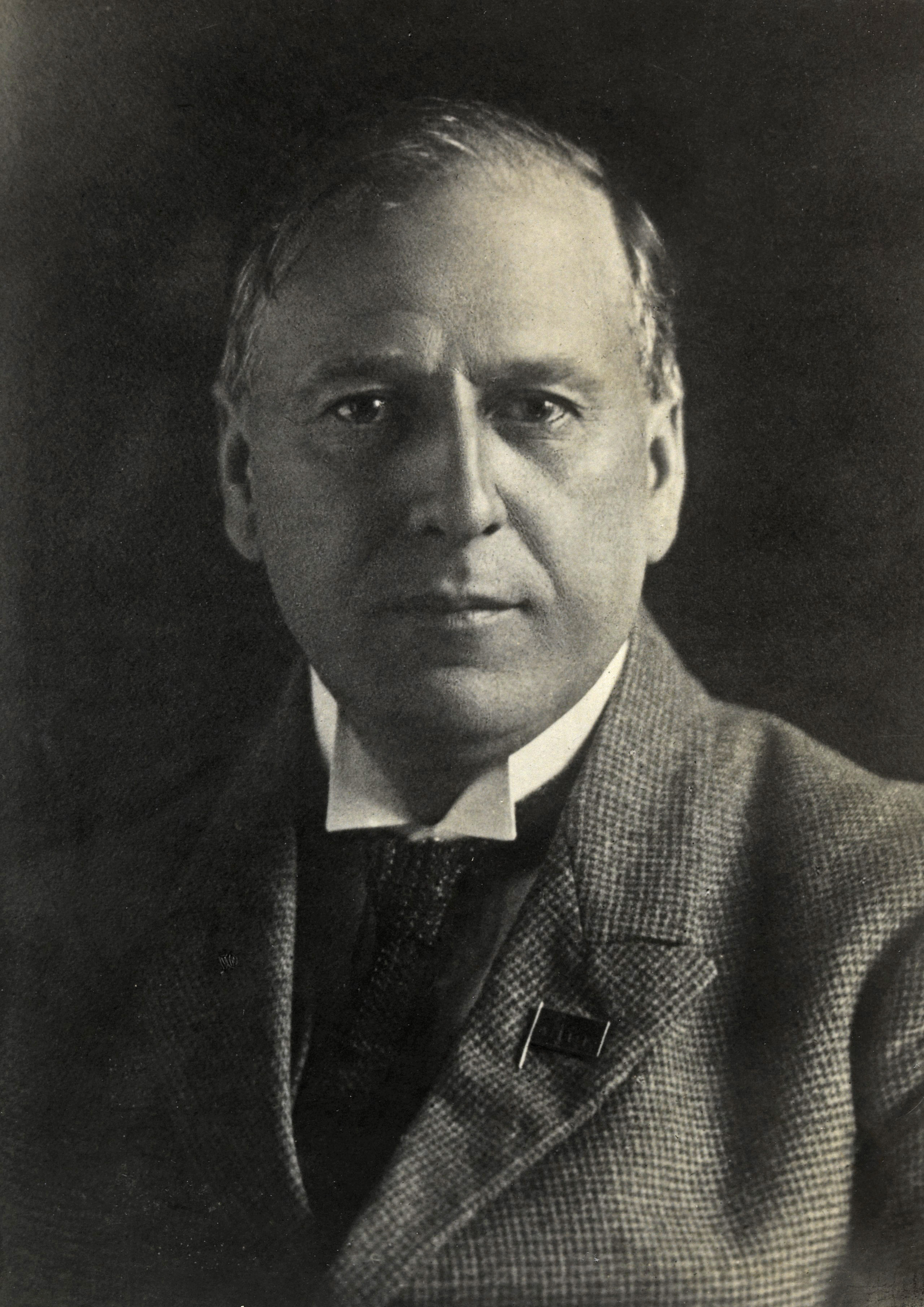
Christian Rakovsky, chairman of the Council of People's Commissars of the Ukrainian Soviet Socialist Republic.

Meanwhile, the Bolshevik troops continued to grow, after the occupation of Kharkiv, as the 1st Ukrainian Soviet Division alone reached over 10,000 soldiers. The Ukrainian capital was left without a fight, seized by the 1st Ukrainian Soviet Division on 5 February. Earlier, on 29 January 1919, the Provisional Workers' and Peasants Government was transformed into the Council of People's Commissars, headed by Christian Rakovsky. The directorate moved to Vinnytsia, and then to Kamianets-Podilskyi.

By the end of January, the Red Army had captured the entirety of left-bank Ukraine. In early February, partisan units allied with the Red Army seized Znamianka, Kryvyi Rih and Dovhyntseve. A workers' uprising broke out in Yelysavethrad, the participants of which, after joining forces with the partisans, seized the city. On 12 February, Novomyrhorod was seized. The Red Army continued their march south and west into areas controlled by Allied interventionist troops. By this time, there were 200,000 people in the Red Army, as the anarchist forces of Nestor Makhno were incorporated into the Ukrainian Soviet ranks and the peasant division of otaman Nykyfor Hryhoriv also defected from the side of the Ukrainian nationalists to the Soviets.

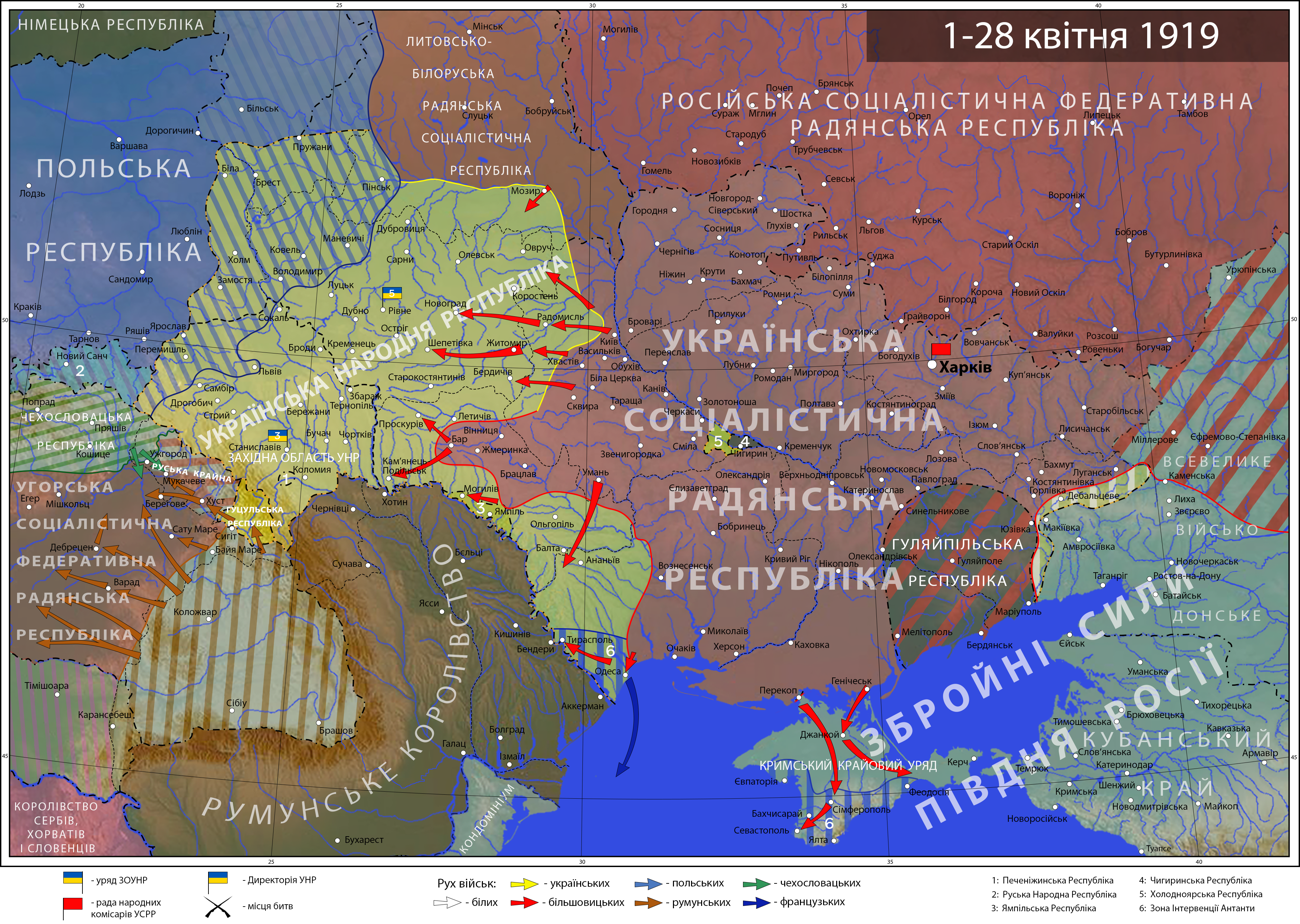
Soviet advances in Ukraine (red) as of late April 1919

After the capture of Kyiv, the Red Army continued its offensive actions in three directions. The Northern Group headed from Mazyr towards Korosten, and from Luninets through Sarny towards Rivne, to prevent the Ukrainian People's Army from joining forces with the Ukrainian Galician Army. The Southern Group, supported by the forces of otaman Hryhoriv, was intended to cut off the UPA troops from possible Allied aid and attacked from the Katerynoslav region and Kremenchuk along the line Zhmerynka-Koziatyn-Podilsk. The third group headed from Kyiv along the Berdychiv-Koziatyn-Zhmerynka line to prevent the northern and southern wings of the Ukrainian People's Republic from joining. Ukrainian troops survived in Volhynia and Podolia, but the existence of the Ukrainian People's Republic, at the same time at war with Poland, and cut off from the Black Sea from the south by French forces, seemed doomed. By mid-February, there were 46,000 soldiers and 14 thousand partisans under the command of Antonov-Ovseenko. The regular army, however, still remained insufficiently disciplined and trained, lacked competent officers and political commissars. In turn, the loyalty of partisan formations to the Bolshevik command was uncertain, these units repeatedly robbed and murdered Jews, or even local newly arrived Soviet officials. In the spring of 1919, the army of the Ukrainian People's Republic withdrew to the vicinity of Kamianets-Podilskyi and western Volhynia, and the Red Army had reached the Zbruch.

The implementation of war communism by the government of Rakovsky, which introduced requisitions and the Cheka to the countryside, quickly alienated a significant part of the Ukrainian peasantry from the Bolshevik rule. Rakovsky was also reluctant to cooperate with the Borotbists, who acted independently of the Bolshevik party. As a result, there was a series of peasant uprisings in the countryside against the new authorities. The reorganization of the Ukrainian Soviet government and the introduction of Borotbist representatives into it only partially calmed the situation. Party officials and activists from Moscow, not understanding the local realities, contributed to the growth of antagonisms.

=== Ukrainian counter-offensive ===
In March 1919, the Ukrainian People's Army launched a counteroffensive, defeating the Red Army along the Koziatyn-Berdychiv line. It came close to achieving its goal of regaining Kyiv. In April, the Red Army launched a counter-attack, seizing Zhmerynka and cutting off the southern flank of the Ukrainian People's Army from its core body. The Ukrainian People's Army was pushed to a narrow strip of territory, with an average width of 40-50 km, in the Brody and Dubno region. An attempted coup by Volodymyr Oskilko weakened it all the more.

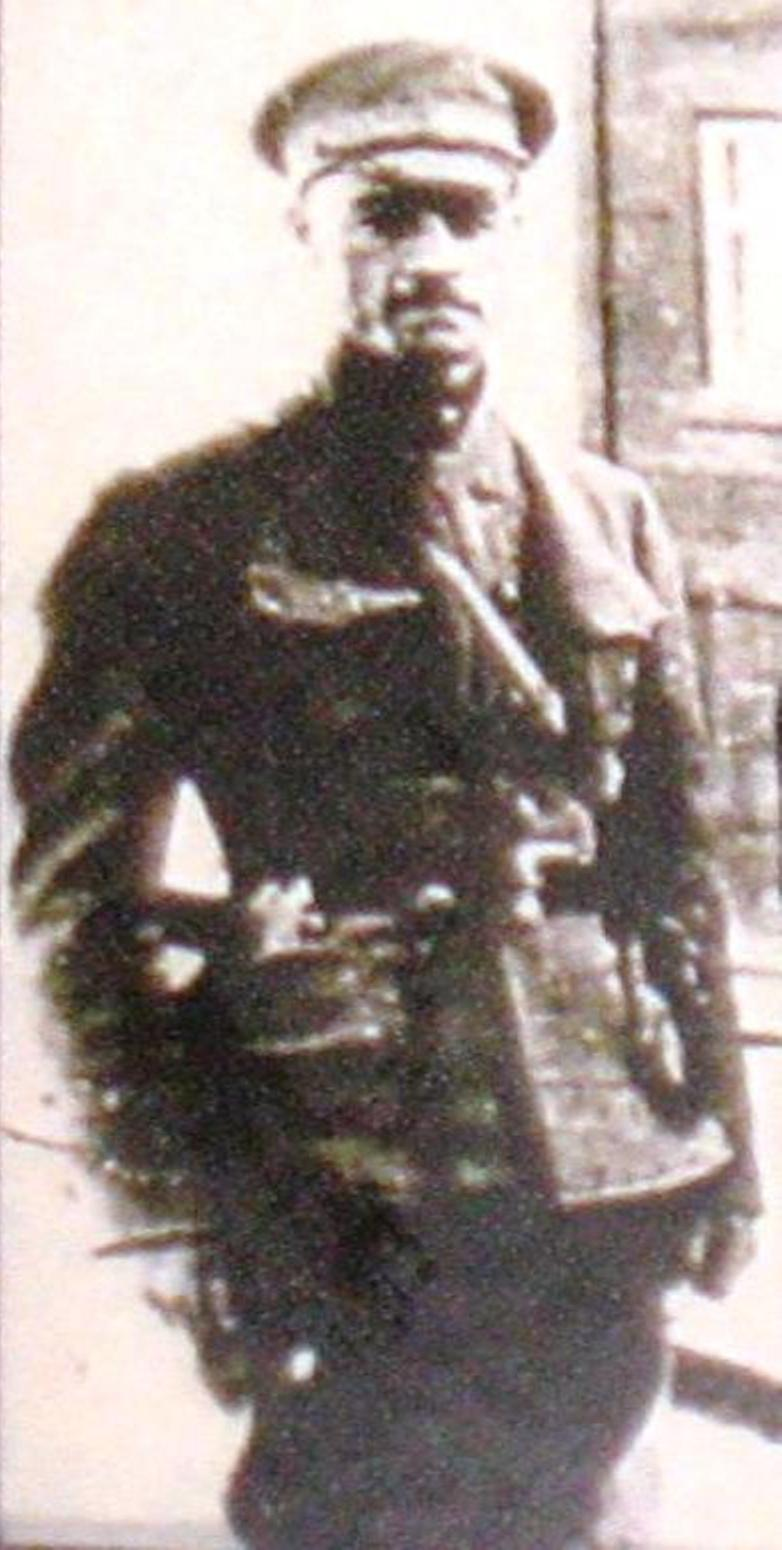
Nykyfor Hryhoriv, who led an anti-Bolshevik uprising in Kherson.

In May 1919, the most serious uprising against the Soviet government in central and southern Ukraine took place - otaman Nykyfor Hryhoriv led a rebellion against the command of the Ukrainian Front and the government of the Ukrainian SSR. His forces numbered 20,000 soldiers, 10 armored trains and 700 machine guns, which allowed him to take control of the area with Katerynoslav, Yelysavethrad, Kherson, Kremenchuk, Mykolaiv, Cherkasy, Oleksandriia and Kryvyi Rih.

The necessity to fight Hryhoriv forced the command of the Ukrainian Front to give up any further offensive in the south-west direction, making it impossible to enter Bessarabia and Eastern Galicia and preventing them from providing military support to the Hungarian Soviet Republic.

In June 1919, after the conclusion of a ceasefire with Poland and regrouping, the Ukrainian People's Army numbered 15,000 active soldiers. It launched a new counter-offensive. At the beginning of the month, it again took control of Podolia. At the end of the month, the Red Army achieved a new victory, taking Proskuriv and approaching Kamianets-Podilskyi. The Ukrainian People's Army achieved a new success when it was joined by Yuriy Tyutyunnyk's troops, which had previously been under the command of Hryhoriv. The Ukrainian counter-offensive reached the line Horodok-Jarmolińce-Szarhorod-Dunajowce-Nowa Uszyca-Wapniarka. This was followed by the merger of the Ukrainian People's Army with the Ukrainian Galician Army, which brought together 85,000 soldiers and 15,000 partisans. At the same time, the Red Army suffered a series of defeats in the fight against the Volunteer Army. At the beginning of June, it lost in the battle for the Donbas. By 27 June, the Ukrainian Soviet capital of Kharkiv was lost to the Whites. The following day, Katerynoslav also fell to the White advance, followed soon after by Poltava, Mykolaiv and Odesa.

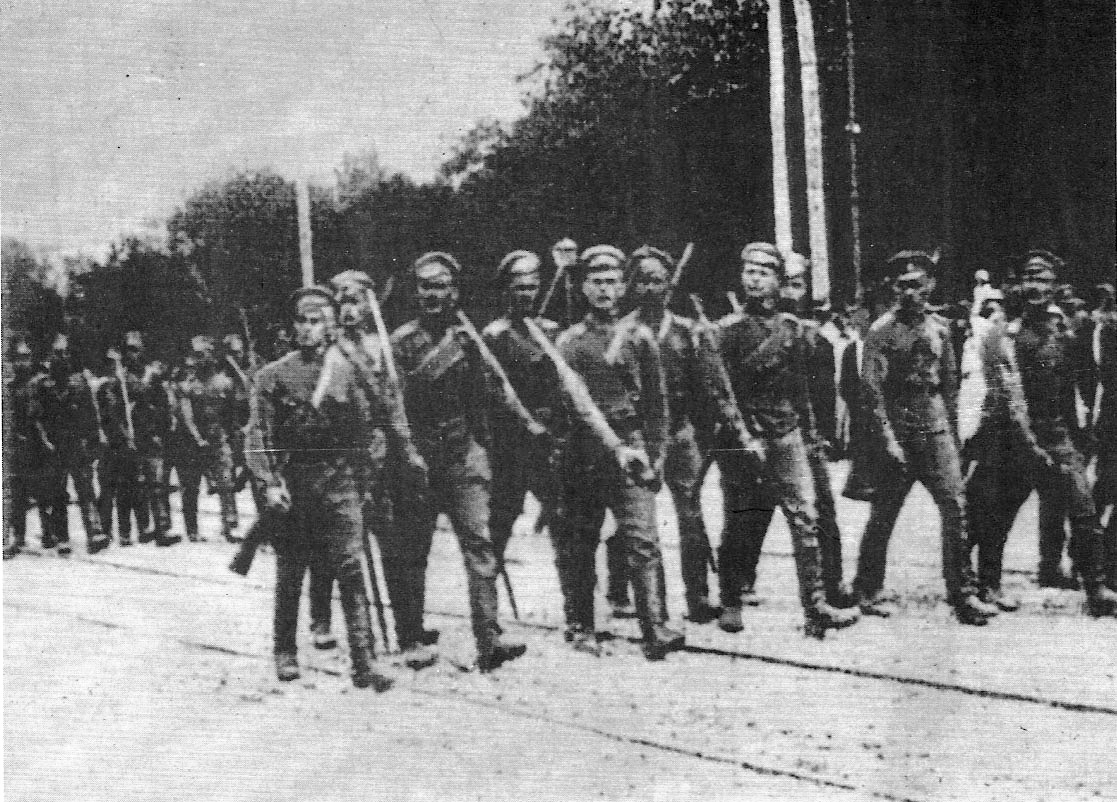
White troops entering Kyiv on 31 August 1919.

In August 1919, the Ukrainian troops carried out a successful offensive in the direction of Kyiv, successively taking Vinnytsia on 12 August, Starokostiantyniv on 14 August, Berdychiv on 19 August and Zhytomyr on 21 August. On 31 August, the Ukrainian Galician troops of Myron Tarnavsky briefly entered Kyiv, which had been abandoned by the Bolsheviks, but a few hours later White troops led by Nikolai Bredov occupied the city. As the bridges on the Dniepr were not manned by the Ukrainian troops, they were forced to hand the city over to the Whites. The conflict between the Ukrainian nationalists and the Whites made it possible for the Bolsheviks to transfer some of their forces from the Katerynoslav region to right-bank Ukraine, near Zhytomyr, and to continue fighting with Petliura's forces.

== Bibliography ==
- Adams, Arthur (1963). Bolsheviks in the Ukraine. The Second Campaign, 1918-1919. New Haven: Yale University Press. OCLC 406299.
- Bruski, Jan Jacek (2004). Petlurowcy. Kraków: Wyd. Arcana. pp. 59–60. ISBN 83-86225-03-3. OCLC 749576912.
- Kenez, Peter (2004). Red Advance, White Defeat. Civil War in South Russia 1919-1920. Washington DC: New Academia Publishing. ISBN 0974493457.
- Mishina, A.V. (2006). "Н.А. Григорьев - Атаман повстанцев Херсонщины" [N. A. Hryhoriv - Otaman of the Kherson insurgents]. New Historical Bulletin (in Russian). 1 (15). Moscow: Ippolitov Publishing House: 1–7. ISSN 2072-9286. OCLC 844626269.
- Serczyk, W. (2001). Historia Ukrainy (in Polish). Wrocław: Zakład Narodowy im. Ossolińskich. ISBN 83-04-04530-3.
- Smele, J. D. (2015). The "Russian" Civil Wars 1916-1926. Ten Years That Shook the World. London: C. Hurst & Co. ISBN 9781849047210.
- Suprunenko, M. (1977). Velyka Žovtneva socialistyčna revoljucija i hromadjansʹka vijna na Ukrajini (1917-20). Istorija Ukrajinsʼkoji RSR (in Ukrainian). Kyiv: Naukowa Dumka. OCLC 637625190.
- Velychenko, Stephen., "How the Bolsheviks Created Soviet Ukraine." https://www.academia.edu/106518713/_How_the_Bolsheviks_Created_Soviet_Ukraine_Ukraine_s_Bolsheviks_1917_1923_Translation_of_Los_bolcheviques_en_Ucrania_Desperta_Ferro_no_59_Sept_2023_Ucrania_y_la_Guerra_Civil_rusa_despertaferro_ediciones_com_
- Zhukovsky, Arkadii (1993). "Ukrainian-Soviet War, 1917–21". Encyclopedia of Ukraine. Vol. 5.
