= Sich Riflemen =

Sich Riflemen Kurin
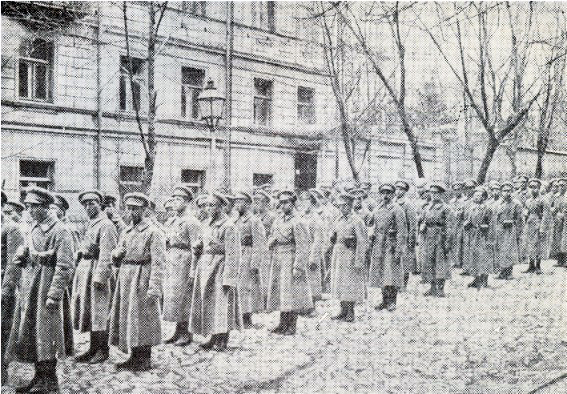
- The first detachment of Sich Riflemen after the suppression of the Kyiv Arsenal January Uprising in January 1918.
- Active: 1917–1919
- Country: (West Ukrainian People's Republic) West Ukraine; Ukraine
- Allegiance: Ukraine
- Branch: Ukrainian People's Army
- Type: Battalion
- Role: infantry
- Size: up to 20,000 (1919)
- Garrison/HQ: Chernivtsi and Kyiv
- Nickname: Sich Riflemen
- March: Oi u luzi chervona kalyna
- Engagements: Ukrainian War of Independence; Ukrainian–Soviet War; Kyiv Arsenal January Uprising, 1918; Anti-Hetman Uprising

Commanders
- Notable commanders: Yevhen Konovalets; Andriy Melnyk; Yuriy Otmarstein; Ivan Rogulsky

The Sich Riflemen Halych-Bukovyna Kurin (Ukrainian: Галицько-буковинський курінь Січових Стрільців, romanized: Halytsko-bukovynskyi kurin Sichovykh Striltsiv) was one of the first regular military units of the Ukrainian People's Army. The unit operated from 1917 to 1919 and was formed from Ukrainian soldiers of the Austro-Hungarian army (Ukrainian Sich Riflemen) and local volunteers.

The first kurin was formed in Kyiv on 13 November 1917. Commanded by Col. Yevhen Konovalets with his chief of staff Andriy Melnyk, the Sich Riflemen had up to 25,000 men at their peak, including artillery, cavalry, reconnaissance and machine-gun units and defended the government of UNR against the Bolshevik insurrection in the capital and later against the regular Red Army forces that advanced into Ukraine in 1918. When Kyiv was recaptured in March 1918, the Ukrainian Sich Riflemen guarded government buildings in the capital and maintained order in the city. The unit later expanded to include two infantry detachments, a cavalry unit and an artillery battery. With the establishment of the Hetmanate of Pavlo Skoropadsky, the Sich Riflemen refused to serve him and were disarmed by the German forces that supported the hetman.

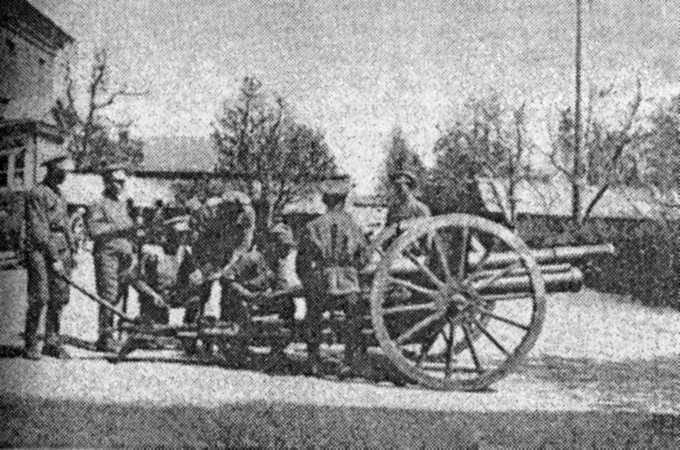
Sich Riflemen during the Ukrainian War of Independence

Soldiers from the unit joined other forces, notably Petro Bolbochan's 2nd Zaporozhian Regiment, and attempted to reestablish themselves under the new command. In August 1918, Skoropadsky finally allowed a partial re-establishment of the Sich Riflemen in Bila Tserkva. The new unit consisted of 1,200 men and was divided into an infantry regiment, an artillery battery and a technical unit. In Bila Tserkva, the Sich Riflemen led the revolt against hetman Skoropadsky, with their ranks expanding to 11,000 by November 1918. Later the Dnipro and Black Sea divisions also joined the unit. In November 1918, with new recruits, the ranks of the Sich Riflemen swelled to 25,000. They played a crucial role in the establishment of the Directorate under Symon Petliura. In December, the unit captured Kyiv and was subsequently divided into smaller units.

Different detachments of Sich Riflemen fought against advancing Bolshevik armies in Ukraine. Together with the Directory, the unit retreated from Kyiv when it was recaptured by the Bolsheviks. The Sich Riflemen also fought on different fronts against General Denikin's White Russian forces. In 1919, the unit took heavy losses in combat and later from typhus. On 6 December 1919, the Sich Riflemen were finally demobilized. Some former soldiers were interned by the Polish army, others continued to fight in smaller detachments in Ukraine.

== Culture and ideology ==
The main ideological principles of the Sich Riflemen were Ukrainian independence, sovereignty, and the unity of the Ukrainian people. The Riflemen chose to prioritise national interests over the socialist idea of class struggle, in contrast to contemporary Ukrainian politicians who were sometimes preoccupied with ideological discussions. A statute for internal use stated: "The army must be a completely centralised institution, in which responsibility lies only with superiors, never with subordinates". In this vein, Konovalets, supported by the riflemen, refused demands that the unit establish military councils. The Rifle Council (Note: Konovalets held the position of chairman of the Rifle Council, with Melnyk as deputy chairman. The Rifle Council had previously organised and served as the de facto leadership of the unit.) was restricted to an advisory role though it retained the right to make major decisions relating to ideological, political, and organisational issues. Riflemen were expected to unconditionally follow orders and were required to sign statements declaring that they would agree to fight Austrian forces if the order were given. During training, an emphasis was placed upon cultural and educational work through courses for the illiterate, the use of Prosvita reading rooms, and visits to Kyiv's theatres among other examples. Sergeants and other officers were expected to live in the barracks and eat with the riflemen.

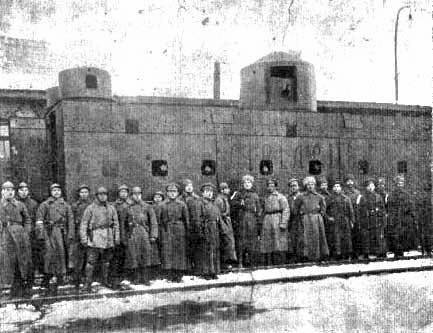
The armoured train 'Sichovy Strelets' [ukr] captured by the Sich Riflemen. Kyiv, December 1918.

When building the new Sich Riflemen unit in Bila Tservka, the level of discipline expected of the soldiers was such that only the most experienced, morally responsible, politically committed, and nationally conscious riflemen were intended to remain. After the capture of Kyiv in December 1918, the Sich Riflemen garrison carried out the Ukrainisation of the city; according to historian Ivan Khoma this was done in a national-radical spirit characteristic of Galician Ukrainians whereby Russian-language signs were ordered to be removed and replaced with ones in Ukrainian.

According to Khoma, the members of the Sich Riflemen that sought to continue the armed struggle against Poland and therein cofounded the Ukrainian Military Organisation in 1920 contributed the ideology and politics of the organisation.

== See also ==
- Ukrainian Sich Riflemen
- 6th Sich Rifle Infantry Division

== Bibliography ==
- Orest Subtelny. Ukraine. A history. University of Toronto Press. 1994. ISBN 0-8020-0591-8.
- Paul Robert Magocsi. The Roots of Ukrainian Nationalism: Galicia As Ukraine's Piedmont. University of Toronto Press. 2002. ISBN 0-521-81988-1.
- Khoma, Ivan (2011). Sichovi Striltsi. Stvorennia, viiskovo-politychna diialnist ta zbroina borotba Sichovykh Striltsiv u 1917-1919rr [Sich Riflemen. Creation, Military-Political Activities and Armed Struggle of the Sich Riflemen in 1917-1919] (in Ukrainian). Kyiv: Nash chas [Our Time]. Archived from the original on 2019-12-25.
- Sich Riflemen during the January Uprising. Ukrayinska Pravda (Istorychna Pravda). 6 April 2012
