= Oleksandr Udovychenko =

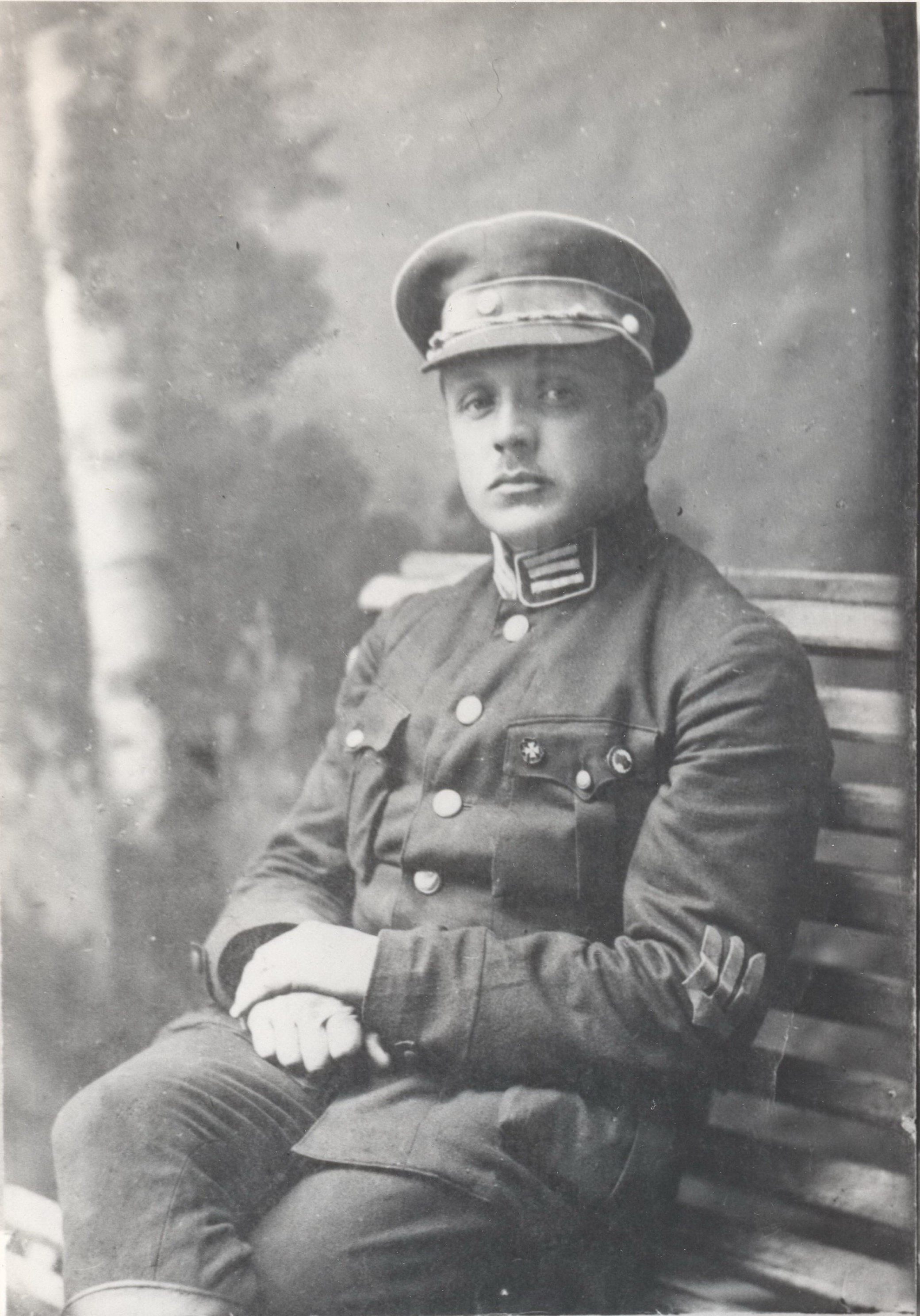
- Udovychenko in 1919
- Born: 20 February 1887; Kharkiv, Kharkov Governorate, Russian Empire
- Died: 19 April 1975 (aged 88) near Menton, France
- Military career
- Allegiance: Russian Empire (1908–1917); Ukrainian People's Republic (1917–1921)
- Branch: Imperial Russian Army; Ukrainian People's Army
- Service years: 1908–1921
- Rank: Colonel General
- Unit: 3rd "Iron" Infantry Division
- Commands: 3rd Haidamaka Regiment; Kholm-Halych Front; Right-bank Front; 3rd "Iron" Infantry Division
- Conflicts: First World War; Ukrainian–Soviet War; Battle of Vapniarka; First Winter Campaign
- Awards: Honorary George's weapon

Oleksandr Ivanovych Udovychenko (Ukrainian: Олександр Іванович Удовиченко 20 February; 1887 – 19 April 1975) was a general of the Army of the Ukrainian National Republic and a military administrator. Later, he served as the Vice-President for the government of the Ukrainian People's Republic in exile.

== Heritage ==
Oleksandr was born to a peasant family of Udovidchenko from Cherkassy volost, Livny uyezd of Orel Governorate that moved Kharkiv. His father served in the Russian Imperial Army earning a rank of colonel. His brother, Mykola Udovychenko, was a captain of the Russian Imperial Army and a khorunzhy general of the Ukrainian People's Army.

== Russian Army ==
Udovychenko was raised in the children shelter of Prince Oldenburg. In 1908 he finished the Military-Topographic college (uchilishche) in the rank of starshina, after which he served in the Topographic Corps of the Russian Imperial Army. With the break of the World War I Udovychenko was transferred to the 129th Bessarabia Regiment with which participated in military operations and was eventually wounded. In 1916 he finished the First Accelerated course Nikolai Military Academy in Saint Petersburg, a member of the Leib-Guard Eger Regiment. In November 1917 Udovychenko was commissioned as a senior staff adjutant for the 21st Infantry Division and the 3rd Caucasus Corps at the rank of staff captain. He was awarded with the honorary George's weapon by the order of the 7th Army #1888 of 21 November 1917.

== Ukrainian Army ==
Udovychenko participated in the 1st and the 2nd All-Ukrainian Military Congresses. Since 16 December 1917 Udovychenko was an assistant to the chief of an operation department of the Ukrainian General Staff. In January 1918 he was appointed a chief of staff for the Haidamaka Kosh of Sloboda Ukraine led by Symon Petlyura and participated in extinguishing of the Bolshevik Uprising at the Kiev Arsenal factory before the Ukrainian parliamentary elections. For a brief stint from 12 March 12 to 1 April 1918 Udovychenko headed the 3rd Haidamaka Regiment. During the times of the Ukrainian State he was appointed an assistant to the chief of intelligence of operation department headed by Vasyl Tyutyunyk (no relations to Yurii Tiutiunnyk). On 31 October 1918 Udovychenko was appointed the head of the department in formation of a Special Army of Main Directorate of Ukrainian State General Staff.

With the fall of the Skoropadsky's regime Udovychenko was recruited by the Directorate of Ukrainian People's Republic. Just after the Christmas, 26 December 1918, he was appointed a Quartermaster General of the Kholm-Halych Front and later the Right-bank Front. In March 1919 - a chief of staff of the Hutsul Kosh. On 6 June 1919 Udovychenko was commissioned as the chief of the 16th Infantry Brigade of the Ukrainian Galician Army, formed out of remains of the Ukrainian People's Army. About a week and a half later the unit was reformed into the 3rd Special Riflemen Division (later the 3rd "Iron" Infantry Division). The unit distinguished itself in battles against the Red Army units led by Iona Yakir near Vapniarka in Podolia. In October 1919 Udovychenko became sick with typhus which was part of widespread epidemic disease in the region. He eventually was taken as a prisoner by the Denikin's army and transferred to Odessa.

Udovychenko managed to escape his captivity and in January 1920 with a group of military officers reached Mohyliv-Podilsky where he headed the formation of the 5th Ukrainian Brigade. The unit later was united with the 4th Brigade to form the 2nd Riflemen Division. Udovychenko eventually was appointed the commander of the division which on 29 May 1920 was renamed into the 3rd "Iron" Division. He stayed in the command of the unit until November 1920 when the Ukrainian Army was forced to cross Zbruch. On 5 October 1920 Udovychenko was promoted to the Khorunzhy General. In December 1920 he was appointed the Inspector General of the Army. During the conflict between the Chief Otaman with the members of the Ukrainian General Staff Udovychenko sided with Symon Petlyura. In Spring of 1921 he became a member of the Supreme Military Council.

== Emigration ==
In emigration Udovychenko worked as a miner in France since 1924 and upon the conclusion of his work contract year later continued to live there. Eventually he became a head of the Veterans Association of the Ukrainian People's Republic in emigration and since 1953 - the head of the European Federation of Ukrainian Military Organizations. In emigration Udovychenko was promoted to Colonel General and was appointed the Minister of Defense of the Ukrainian National Rada Executive Committee. From 1954 to 1961 he served as the Vice-President of the Ukrainian People's Republic in exile.

== Publications ==
- Ukraine in the war for the Statehood (Winnipeg, 1954) Electronic copy (in Ukrainian)
- Third Iron Division Vol.1 (New York, 1971), Vol.2 (New York, 1982)

== Bibliography ==
- Tinchenko, Ya. Officer Corps of the Ukrainian People's Army (1917-1921). Vol.1. Kiev, 2007. pages 449-450. (Тинченко Я. Офiцерський корпус Армii Украiньскоi Народноi Республiки (1917—1921). Кн. 1. Киев, 2007. С. 449—450.)
- Malanyuk, Ye. Memoirs. Kiev, 2004. (Евген Маланюк Уривки зi спогадiв. Киiв, 2004)
- Kubiyovych, V. Encyclopedia of Ukraine. "Molode Zhyttya". Paris, New York, 1954-1989.
