= Medvyn rebellion =

1919 anti-Russian uprising in Ukraine

Самостійна Медвинська республіка Independent Medvyn Republic
- 1919–1921
- Flag
- Status: Military administration
- Capital: Medvyn 49°23′25″N 30°47′5″E
- Largest city: Medvyn
- Common languages: Ukrainian
- Government: Republic
  - квітень 1919 — червень 1919: Ensign Kolomiets, left activist Pyrhavka
  - August 18, 1920 — October 13, 1920: Homa Lebed (Sidorenko)
- Historical era: Ukrainian War of Independence
  - Established: April 1919
  - Disestablished: 1921

Population
- 15 000
- Currency: hryvnia

The Medvyn rebellion was an anti-Russian and anti-Bolshevik uprising of the Ukrainian inhabitants of Medvyn in the Boguslav region in 1919–1922, loyal to the Ukrainian People's Republic. The culmination of the uprising was the proclamation of the Medvin Republic. Suppressed by the occupation corps of the Russian Armed Forces and Russian special services.

== Preconditions ==
Revolution of 1917 affected on life in Medvyn. Local people decided to confiscate private property of Russian aristocratic family Branicki.

Ukrainian People's Republic was turned into a provisional dictatorship of Hetman of Ukraine Pavlo Skoropadskyi. Many locals was against this regime. Directorate of Ukraine returned control over this settlement in December 1918.

== Independent Medvyn Republic ==
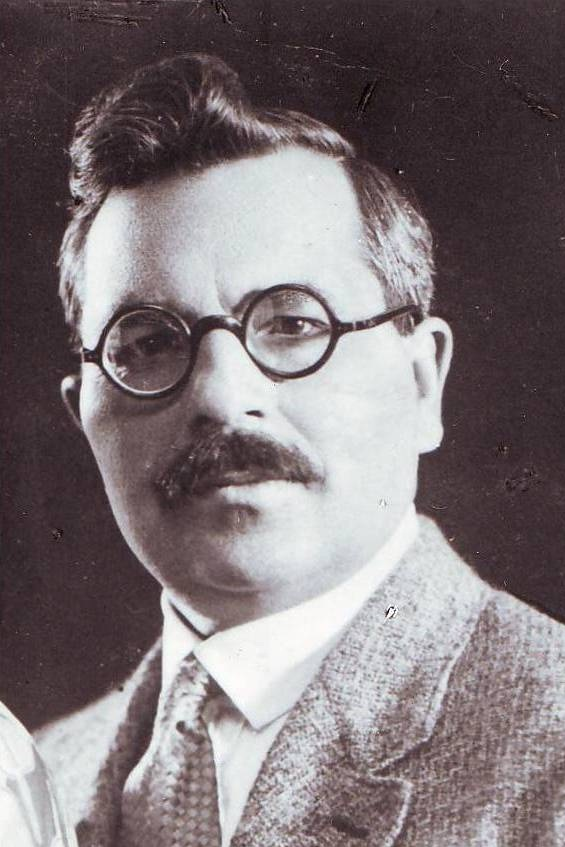
Hryhoriy Pyrhavka was one of the organizers of the uprising in Medvyn and Isayky in 1919.

After Russian Bolsheviks invasion in April 1919 into Ukraine, the regular Ukrainian army withdrew. Local supporters of Ukrainian People's Republic established the "Independent Medvyn Republic" in Medvyn and Isaiky under the leadership of Ensign Kolomiets and Socialist-Revolutionary Pyrhavka, a former member of the Ukrainian Constituent Assembly. The insurgents protested against the Bolshevik system. Boguslav was captured by combatants, 50 Red Army soldiers were killed, and hostages were taken. The rebel troops numbered several thousand people. With the help of the international regiment of the Hungarian Rudolf Fekete and the battalion of the Kyiv County Military Commissariat, the Medvin Uprising was defeated.

On August 18, 1920, Russian occupants tried to draft men into Red army and confiscate food from locals. On the same day, the locals proclaimed a republic and dug up harrows around the village to defend it. They were sure that they would last for several months, and there, they say, help would come from neighboring villages and Petliura's army would come. The insurgents made "raids" in the nearest settlements – Luka, Kivshovata, Brane Pole, Vilkhovets, Stebliv. However, the defenders of the republic did not have enough weapons (for every 1,000 volunteers – only 300 rifles and a little ammunition). When the insurgents attacked a sugar factory a few days later and disarmed several Bolsheviks there, the incident was noticed in Kyiv and soon in Moscow. The Bolsheviks were worried that other villages might follow Medvyn's example.

After reconnaissance, a Russian cavalry jumped into the village. The attackers burned the Church of the Assumption, looted several bypasses and killed two owners. After the firefight, they retreated. Almost every day several hundred Bolsheviks with machine guns attacked the village. Insurgent rangers reported in time, the churches rang bells, peasants quit their jobs and fled to defend themselves. The peasants heroically defended their village from Russian troops, only a regular army division broke the resistance of the peasants and seized the village. From October 10 to 13, 1920, the operation to encircle the Medvyn Republic ended. Medvyn was set on fire, about 600 houses were burned, and an insurgent flag was seized. Surviving rebel forces retreated to the forest.

The Bolsheviks plundered the village for three days. They also collected a huge tax. For several days the Bolsheviks went from house to house looking for bandits, and they were most interested in household treasure. After paying a large contribution and the introduction of military power in the village, soviet secret-police organization Cheka section arrived. All the suspects were sent to Smila, where a military tribunal was sitting, but no one returned.

The insurgent troops were reorganized and operated with small forces near Lysianka, Stebliv, and the areas adjacent to Medvyn. It was at this time that the Bolsheviks transferred their units to the Wrangel front and one of the convoys of the 1st Cavalry Army of Budyonny was defeated near Medvyn (in the Gudariv Yar tract). All the blame fell on Medvyn. On the morning of October 13, 1920, a punitive detachment arrived in Medvyn from Zvenigorodka. The Bolsheviks announced the gathering of the village. Visitors selected up to hundreds of young men aged 18 to 30 and took them to the parish. The Bolshevik said: "You are a well-known bandit village and must return everything looted from the military convoy." If not, then, they say, it will be the same for everyone: he took the man out of the crowd and shot him in the head in retaliation. He gave people one hour to bring food. The locals were frightened and ran away. The column of hostages was taken out of the village and near the Kovtuniv tract the forest was killed. Several men managed to escape. At night, locals dismantled the dead and buried them in village cemeteries.

After the occupation of the mini-republic, the Bolsheviks searched and destroyed for another two decades in Medvyn all those who were somehow involved in the uprising. In total, they killed more than 6,000 people in Medvyn.

== Honoring ==
Ivan Dubinets, a resident of Medvin and a witness to the Medvyn Uprising, published a book in 1952 in exile in the United States. Emigrant Oleksandra Brazhnyk, who visited her native Medvin in the 1960s, brought her to Ukraine on a double-day suitcase.

In 2019, Natalia and Viktor Goryansky, based on the script by Marina Gogula, created the documentary "Medvin Uprising".

Today, in the center of the village there is a memorial in honor of the Medvyn Republic, and at the place of execution of 80 hostages restored the cross.
