= Ukrainian–Soviet War =

Armed conflict in Europe (1917–1921)

- Part of the Ukrainian War of Independence and Soviet westward offensive of 1918–1919
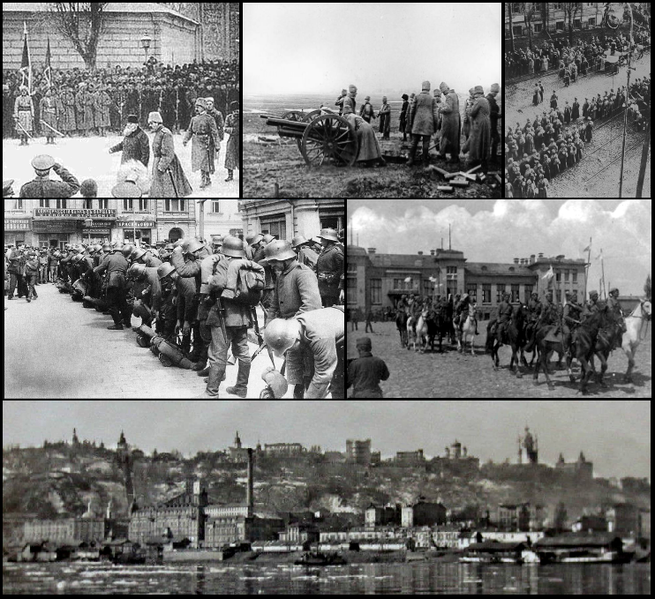
- Parade of Ukrainian People's Republic troops in Kyiv led by Mykhailo Hrushevsky in December 1917, shelling of the Ukrainian army by the Bolsheviks, defense of Kyiv from the Bolsheviks in February 1918, entry of German troops into Kiev, entry of the Ukrainian People's Republic army into Bakhmut, Kyiv under the rule of Skoropadsky
Date	First: 8 November 1917 – 12 June 1918; Second: 2 January 1919 – November 1921
Location	Ukraine
Result	First: Ukraine and Central Powers victory Second: Soviet victory
Territorial changes	Partition of Ukraine between the Bolsheviks and Poland; Establishment of the Ukrainian Soviet Socialist Republic (UkSSR) and its absorption into the Soviet Union

Belligerents
Ukrainian People's Republic UPR loyalist forces: West Ukrainian People's Republic (1918-1919); Komańcza Republic (1918-1919); Hutsul Republic (1919); Medvyn Republic (1919-1921); Kholodny Yar Republic (1919-1921); Green Army (June–September 1919); Ukrainian State (1918); Austria-Hungary (1918); German Empire (1918); Poland (1920–1921)	Russian SFSR; Ukrainian SSR; UNRR (1917); URR (1918); Makhnovshchina (1918-1920); Green Army (1918-February 1919); Hryhorivschyna (January -May 1919)		Makhnovshchina (1918-1919, 1920-1921); Green Army (February–June 1919); Hryhorivschyna (May–July 1919)

Commanders and leaders
(Ukrainian People's Republic) Symon Petliura; Yevhen Konovalets; Petro Bolbochan (executed); (Ukrainian People's Republic) Mykhailo Pavlenko; (Ukrainian People's Republic) Oleksandr Udovychenko; Oleksandr Hrekov; Pavlo Skoropadsky (surrendered)	(Russian Soviet Federative Socialist Republic) Mikhail Muraviev; (Russian Soviet Federative Socialist Republic) Vladimir Antonov-Ovseenko; (Ukrainian Soviet Socialist Republic) Georgiy Pyatakov; (Ukrainian Soviet Socialist Republic) Volodymyr Zatonsky; (Ukrainian Soviet Socialist Republic) Nikolay Shchors †		(Makhnovshchina) Nestor Makhno (WIA); (Makhnovshchina) Semen Karetnyk (executed); (Makhnovshchina) Fedir Shchus †; (Makhnovshchina) Viktor Bilash; Otaman Zelenyi †; Nykyfor Hryhoriv X

The Ukrainian–Soviet War (Ukrainian: українсько-радянська війна, romanized: ukrainsko-radianska viina) is the term commonly used in post-Soviet Ukraine for the events taking place between 1917 and 1921, nowadays regarded essentially as a war between the Ukrainian People's Republic and the Bolsheviks (Russian SFSR and Ukrainian SSR). The war ensued soon after the October Revolution when Lenin dispatched Antonov's expeditionary group to Ukraine and Southern Russia.

Soviet historiography viewed the Bolshevik victory as the liberation of Ukraine from occupation by the armies of Western and Central Europe (including that of Poland). Conversely, modern Ukrainian historians consider it a failed war of independence by the Ukrainian People's Republic against the Bolsheviks. The conflict was complicated by the involvement of the Revolutionary Insurgent Army of Ukraine, non-Bolshevik Russians of the White Army, and the armies of the Second Polish Republic, Austria-Hungary, and the German Empire, among others.

== Historiography ==
In Soviet historiography and terminology, the armed conflict is depicted as part of the greater Russian Civil War: in Ukraine, this war was fought between the national government (led by Symon Petliura) and the Russian Bolshevik government (led by Lenin).

The war may be divided into three phases:

1. December 1917 – April 1918: Revolutionary days, attempted Bolshevik coups, invasion of Ukraine by the Red Army formations, signing of protectorate treaty, and liberation from the Bolsheviks.
2. December 1918 – December 1919: Civil war in Ukraine, full-scale invasion by the Red Army, unification of Ukraine, anti-Soviet peasant uprisings, Denikin's Volunteer Army and the Allied intervention, loss of West Ukraine to Poland.
3. Early 1920 – late 1921: Polish–Soviet War (Treaty of Warsaw), Russian Civil War (between Bolshevik armies and the Armed Forces of South Russia), Ukrainian guerrilla operations (First and Second Winter Campaigns), government in exile.

=== Important documents ===
- Declarations of the Central Council of Ukraine (Universals)
- Ultimatum of Sovnarkom to the Central Council of Ukraine
- Treaty of Brest-Litovsk granting status of neutrality to Ukraine as a buffer state of the Central Powers, as well as military protection, in negotiating peace with the Bolsheviks of the Russian Soviet Federative Socialist Republic.
- Unification Act, unification of the Western Ukrainian People's Republic with the UPR
- Treaty of Warsaw, Polish-Ukrainian anti-Bolshevik pact
- Peace of Riga, partition of Ukraine between Poland and the Bolshevik USSR

== Background ==
After the February Revolution of 1917, the nationalities within the Russian Republic (formerly the Russian Empire) demanded national autonomy from Petrograd. In the summer of 1917, the Russian Provisional Government approved regional administration over some parts of Ukraine.

In November 1917, the Central Council of Ukraine denounced the Bolsheviks' armed coup against the Russian Provisional Government, known as the October Revolution, and declared it would decisively fight against any attempted similar coup in Ukraine. A special joint committee for preservation of revolution was organized to keep the situation under control. The Kiev Military District command tried to prevent a Bolshevik coup, leading to street fights and eventually surrendering of pro-Bolshevik troops in the city. On November 14, 1917, the Ukrainian Central Rada issued its "Appeal of the Central Council to the citizens of Ukraine" in which it sanctioned transfer of the state power in Ukraine to itself. On November 16, a joint session of the Rada and executive committee of the local workers and soldiers soviets recognized the Central Rada as the regional authority in Ukraine. On November 20, 1917, the Rada declared Ukraine the Ukrainian People's Republic as an autonomous part of the Russian Republic and scheduled the January 9, 1918 elections to a Ukrainian Constituent Assembly. The Secretary of Military Affairs, Symon Petliura, expressed his intentions to unite both the Southwestern and Romanian fronts that were stretched across Ukraine into one Ukrainian Front under the command of Colonel General Dmitry Shcherbachev.

On December 17, 1917, the Russian Bolsheviks planned a rival All-Ukrainian Congress of Soviets and on December 11–12, 1917, they set off a number of coups across Ukraine in Kiev, Odessa and Vinnytsia. They were successfully defeated by the Rada. On December 17, 1917, Sovnarkom, which had initiated peace talks with Central Powers earlier that month, sent a 48-hour ultimatum to the Rada requesting it stop "counterrevolutionary actions" or prepare for war. Also on December 17, 1917, Reingold Berzins led his troops from Minsk towards Kharkov to the Don. They engaged in an armed conflict at a rail station in Bakhmach with the Ukrainian troops who refused to let the Russian red forces (three regiments and an artillery division) pass. The Central Rada did not accept the accusations and stated its conditions: recognition of the Ukrainian People's Republic, non-interference in its internal affairs and affairs of the newly organized Ukrainian Front, permission on transferring of Ukrainized troops to Ukraine, division of the former imperial finances, participation of the Ukrainian People's Republic in the general peace negotiations. The same day the All-Ukrainian Congress of Soviets in Kiev, after the Bolshevik delegation left, recognized the authority of the Ukrainian government and denounced the ultimatum of the Soviet Russian government. The Kiev Bolsheviks in their turn denounced that congress and scheduled another one in Kharkov. The next day, Sovnarkom in Moscow decided to go to war. Vladimir Antonov-Ovseyenko was appointed by Vladimir Lenin the commander-in-chief of expeditionary force against Kaledin and the South Russia, while near the borders with Ukraine (Bryansk–Belgorod), Red troops began to gather.

The Kievan Bolsheviks who fled to Kharkov joined the regional Congress of Soviets of the Donetsk-Krivoy Rog Soviet Republic. They then declared this meeting the First All-Ukrainian Congress of Soviets that announced the creation of the Ukrainian People's Republic of Soviets. It called the Central Rada of Ukraine an enemy of the people declaring war against it on January 2. The Rada then broke all ties with Petrograd on January 22, 1918, and declared independence, thereby commencing the Ukrainian War of Independence. It was around this point that Bolshevik troops began invading Ukraine from Russia. Russian military units from Kharkov, Moscow, Minsk and the Baltic Fleet invaded Ukraine.

== War ==
=== December 1917–April 1918 ===
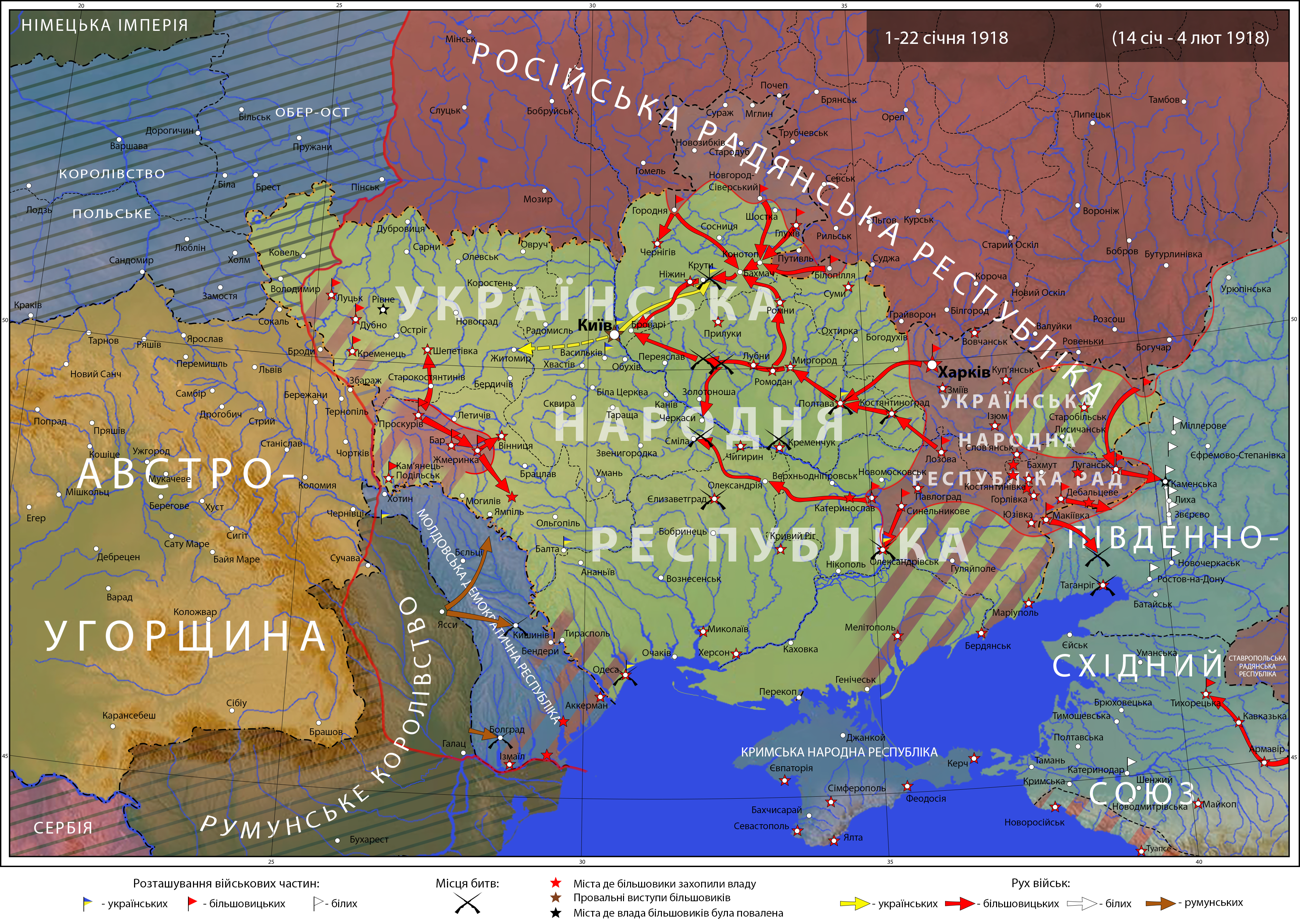
Bolshevik advances in Ukraine (red) by early February 1918

The Bolsheviks, numbering around 30,000 and composed of Russian army regulars stationed at the front, a number of garrisoned units, and Red Guard detachments composed of laborers from Kharkov Governorate and the Donbass, began by advancing from the northeast led by Vladimir Antonov-Ovseenko and Mikhail Muravyov. The Ukrainian forces at the time of the invasion consisted of about 15,000 made up from volunteer detachments and several battalions of the Free Cossacks and the Sich Riflemen.

The invasion of pro-Soviet forces from Russia was accompanied by uprisings initiated in Ukraine by the local Bolsheviks in the developed cities throughout the territory of left-bank Ukraine as well as right-bank Ukraine. The Bolsheviks, led by Yevgenia Bosch, conducted a successful uprising in Vinnytsia sometime in December 1917. They took charge of the 2nd Guard Corps and moved towards Kiev to help the Bolsheviks in the city. Pavlo Skoropadsky with a regiment of the Free Cossacks managed to stop them near Zhmerynka, disarm them, and deport them to Russia. The other Bolshevik forces captured Kharkov (December 26), Yekaterinoslav (January 9), Aleksandrovsk (January 15), and Poltava (January 20) on their way to Kiev. On January 27, the Bolshevik army groups converged in Bakhmach and then set off under the command of Muravyov to take Kiev.

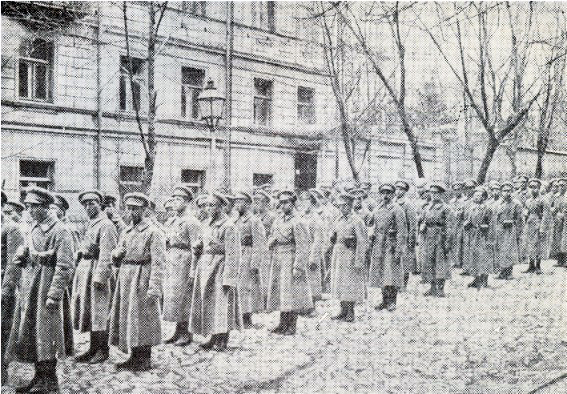
The first detachment of Sich Riflemen after the capture of Kiev in January 1918.

As the Bolsheviks marched towards Kiev, a small Ukrainian National Republic unit of less than 500 schoolboys (some sources give a figure of 300), commanded by Captain Ahapiy Honcharenko, was hastily organized and sent to the front on January 29, 1918, to take part in the Battle of Kruty. The small unit consisted mainly of the Student Battalion (Kurin) of Sich Riflemen, a unit of the Khmelnytsky Cadet School, and a Haidamaka detachment. About half of the 500 were killed during the battle.

On January 29, 1918, the Kiev Arsenal January Uprising, a Bolshevik-organized armed revolt, began at the Kiev Arsenal factory. The workers of the plant were joined by the soldiers of the Ponton Battalion, the 3rd Aviation Regiment and the Sahaydachny regiment. Sensing defeat, the UNR forces stormed the city on February 3. After six days of battle and running low on food and ammunition, the uprising was suppressed, resulting in the death of about 300 workers in total, though according to Soviet sources, more than 1,500 pro-Soviet workers and soldiers were killed during the struggle. On February 8, the Ukrainian People's Republic evacuated Kyiv in order to avoid destruction by opposing Soviet troops, which then entered Kyiv under Mikhail Muravyov's on February 9.

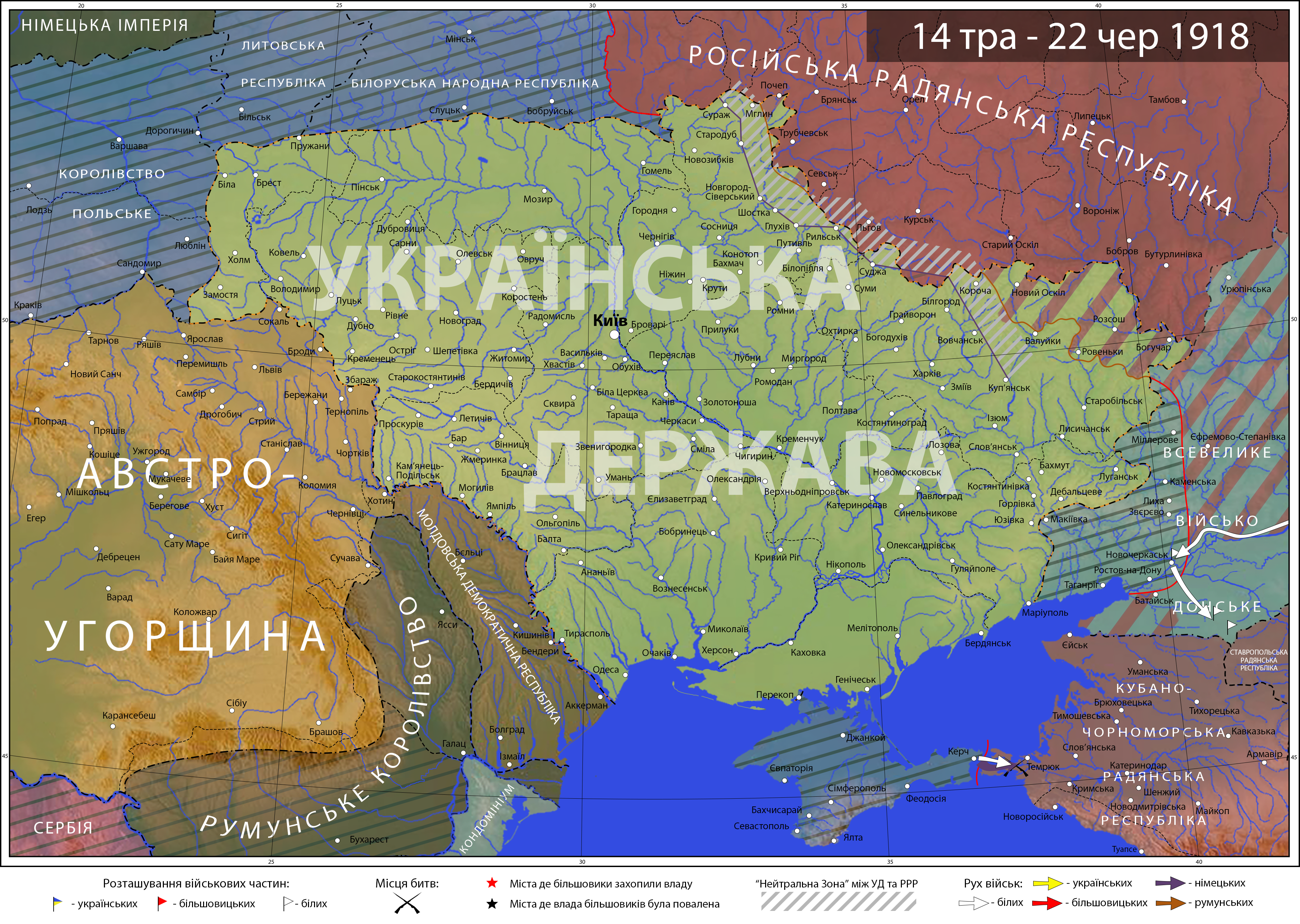
Lands controlled by the Ukrainian State (green) in June 1918

Once the Bolsheviks took Kyiv, they began an offensive in right-bank Ukraine. However, on February 9, the UNR signed the Treaty of Brest-Litovsk and thus received aid from German and Austro-Hungarian troops in late February, over 450,000 troops. In exchange for military aid, the Ukrainians were to deliver foodstuffs to the Central Powers. Under the command of Symon Petlura, the combined forces pushed the Bolsheviks out of Right-Bank Ukraine and retook Kyiv on March 1. Because of the socialist policies of the Rada, mainly the policy on land, which affected food exports to the Central Powers, on April 28 the German forces disbanded the Central Rada and installed the Hetman government in its place. Ukrainian, German, and Austro-Hungarian armies continued making gains, taking back left-bank Ukraine, Crimea and the Donets Basin. These setbacks forced the Bolsheviks to sign a preliminary peace treaty with the Ukrainian People's Republic on June 12.

=== Post-Hetmanate intervention ===
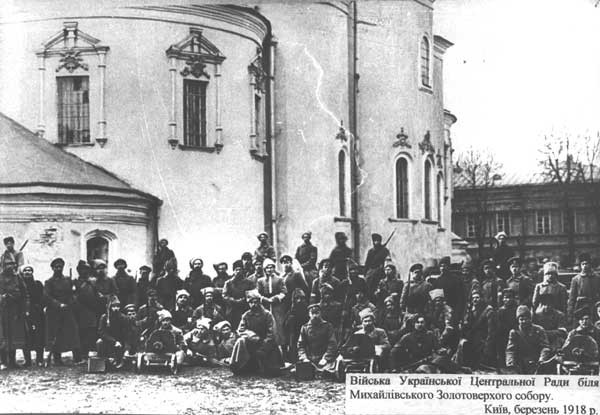
Ukrainian People's Army soldiers in front of St. Michael's Golden-Domed Monastery in Kiev

During November 1918, troops from the Directorate of Ukraine orchestrated the overthrow of the Hetmanate with some help from the Bolsheviks. German forces led by the Soldatenrat kept their neutrality during the two-week-long civil war as they were withdrawing from the country, due to the defeat of the German Empire in World War I. The Directorate reestablished the Ukrainian People's Republic. On January 22, 1919, the neighboring Ukrainian republics united under the Unification Act.

The Central Military-Revolutionary Committee in Kursk on October 22, 1918, issued the order to form two divisions under the Army Group, the Ukrainian Front or the Group of the Kursk Direction. The group was assigned the Worker's Division of Moscow, the 9th Soviet Division, 2nd Orlov Brigade, and two armored trains. According to Antonov-Ovsiyenko, the Army accounted for some 6,000 soldiers, 170 artillery guns, 427 machine guns, 15 military planes, and 6 armored trains. On December 15, 1918, the meeting of the Ukrainian chief of staff was called in Kiev headed by Otaman Osetsky and including the Chief Otaman Petliura, Colonel Bolbachan, Colonel Shapoval, Sotnik Oskilko. They were discussing the border security and formed a plan in case of threat from all sides.

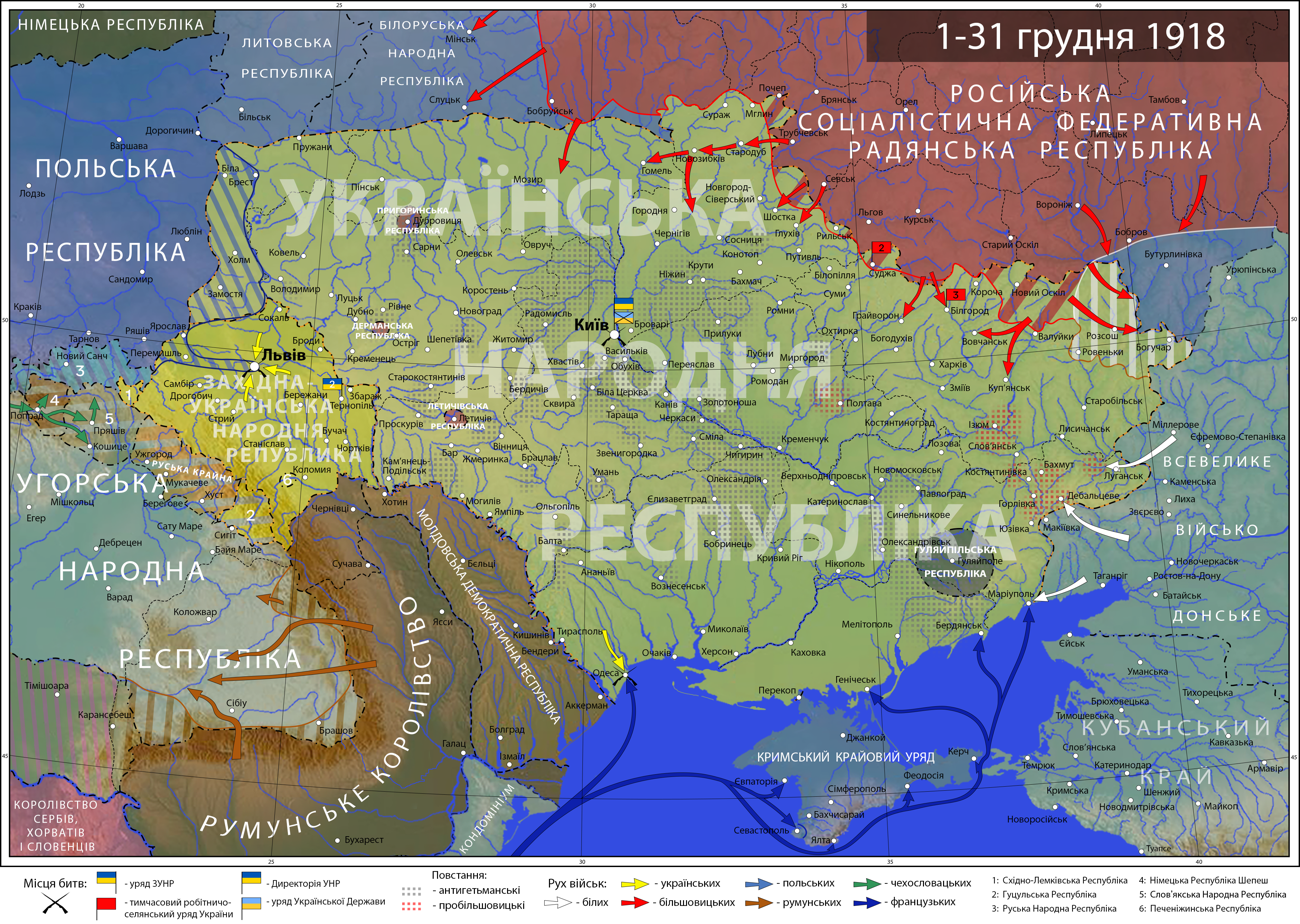
Beginning of the second Bolshevik invasion in December 1918

To stop the coming war with the Bolsheviks, the government of Chekhivsky sent a delegation to Moscow led by the Minister of Foreign Affairs, Semen Mazurenko. The delegation succeeded in signing a preliminary peace agreement yet it did not stop the aggression from the Russian side due to poor communication between the delegation in Moscow and the government of the Ukrainian People's Republic. On December 28, 1918, the Central Committee of the Left UPSR officially declared the mobilization of forces in the support of the Soviet government by an armed staging. From the beginning of January 1919, the Bolshevik bands consistently were crossing the eastern and north-eastern borders to raid.

==== January 1919–June 1919 ====
During the Red Army's westward offensive in the winter of 1918–1919, Soviet forces moved into Byelorussia as well as into Lithuania, as the newly created Soviet republic of Byelorussia had hoped to include Lithuania. On January 7, 1919, the Bolsheviks launched an offensive, with an army led by Vladimir Antonov-Ovseyenko, Joseph Stalin, and Volodymyr Zatonsky. The Directorate declared war once again against Russia on January 16 after several preliminary ultimatums to the Russian SFSR sovnarkom to withdraw their troops. The two main directions of the Bolshevik's forces were onto Kiev and Kharkov.

The Soviet forces were advanced across North-eastern Ukraine and occupied Rylsk and Novgorod-Seversky. On December 21, 1918, the Ukrainian Front took the important strategic railroad connection in Kupiansk. After that, a full-scale advance started between the Dnieper and Oskil Rivers. On January 3, the Red Army took Kharkov, almost as by the same scenario when Bolsheviks had occupied Kiev in February 1918. The Ukrainian forces consisted of two regular troop formations, the Zaporozhian Corps and the Sich Riflemen, as well as partisan detachments. These partisans were led by unreliable atamans which occasionally sided with the Bolsheviks, such as Zeleny, Anhel, and Hryhoriv. The army which had over 100,000 men, fell to about 25,000 due to peasants leaving the army and desertions to the Bolsheviks. Bolbochan with the remnants of the Zaporizhian Corps retreated to Poltava which was holding off the Red Army for a couple of weeks more. On January 6, 1919, the government of Pyatakov officially declared the creation of the Ukrainian SSR. Yet his government continued to stay in Kursk until January 24. On January 4 the Bolsheviks Army Group Ukrainian Front was reformed into the unified Ukrainian front under the command of Antonov-Ovsiyenko with his deputies Kotsiubynsky and Schadenko. On the several inquiries about the purpose of the Russian Army in Ukraine that the Directory was sending to Moscow, Chicherin finally responded on January 6:

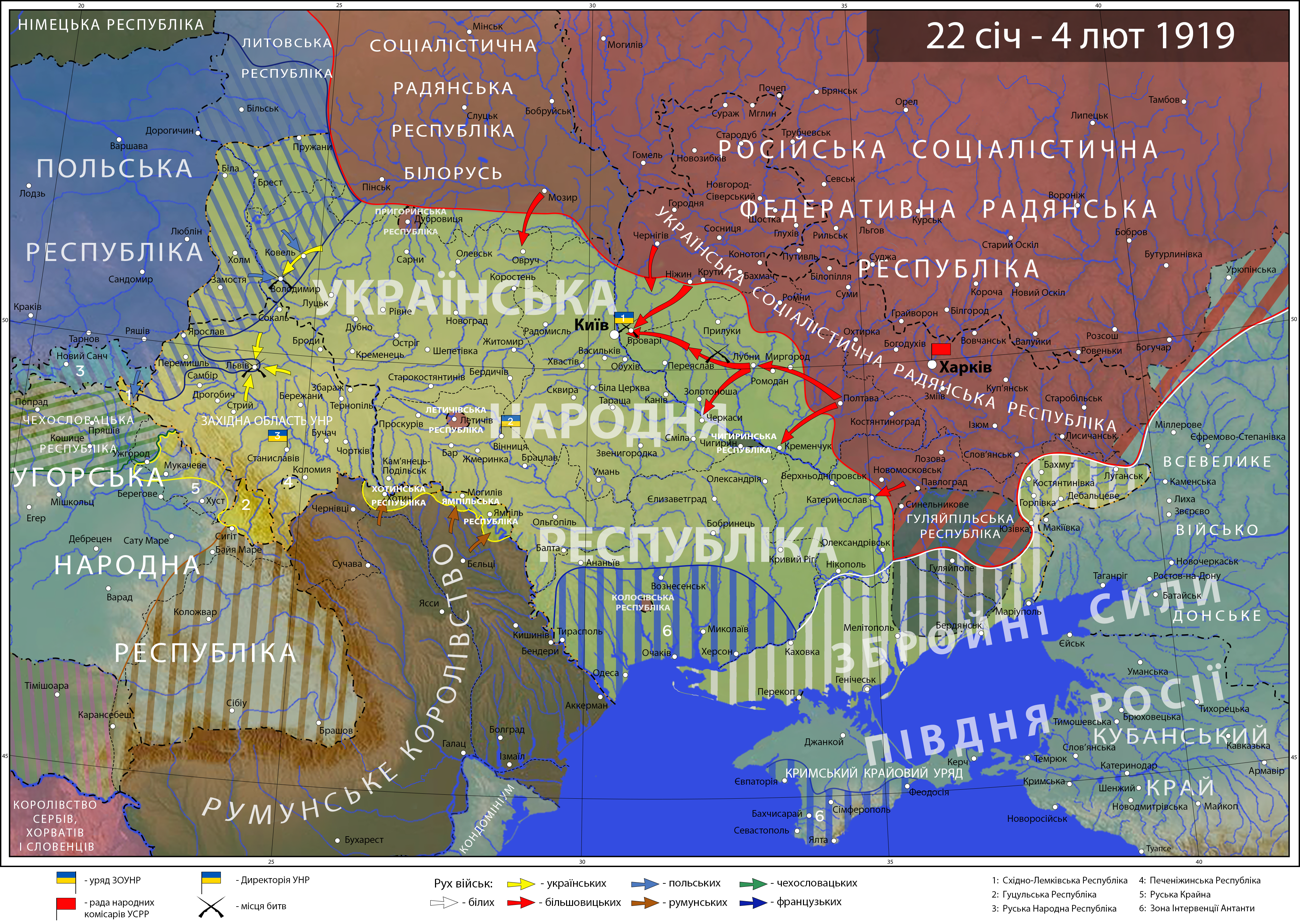
Bolshevik advance by early February 1919

...there is no army of the Russian Socialist Soviet Republic in Ukraine. At this time the military action that takes place on the territory of Ukraine is between the armies of Directorate and the Ukrainian Soviet Government which is completely independent.

On January 12, the troops under the command of Mykola Schors occupied Chernigov while other units under command of Pavlo Dybenko took Lozova, Pavlohrad, Synelnykove, and established contact with Nestor Makhno. After some long discussion between the members of the Directory and other state officials, it was decided to declare War against Soviet Russia. The only person who was against it, was the chairman of the Directory Volodymyr Vynnychenko, while Shapoval, for example, for some reason was simply requesting the prompt creation of the Soviet government. Denikin later commented that the war declaration did not change absolutely anything on the frontlines and only reflected the political crisis inside the Ukrainian government with the victory of the military party of Petliura-Konovalets-Hrekov over Vynnychenko-Chekhivsky. On January 20 the Soviet Army took Poltava while the Ukrainian troops retreated further to Kremenchuk. On January 26 Dybenko took Yekaterinoslav. The Soviets took Left-Bank Ukraine, and then marched on to Kiev. On February 2 they forced the Directorate to move to Vinnytsia while troops of Schors and Bozhenko occupied Kiev three days later.

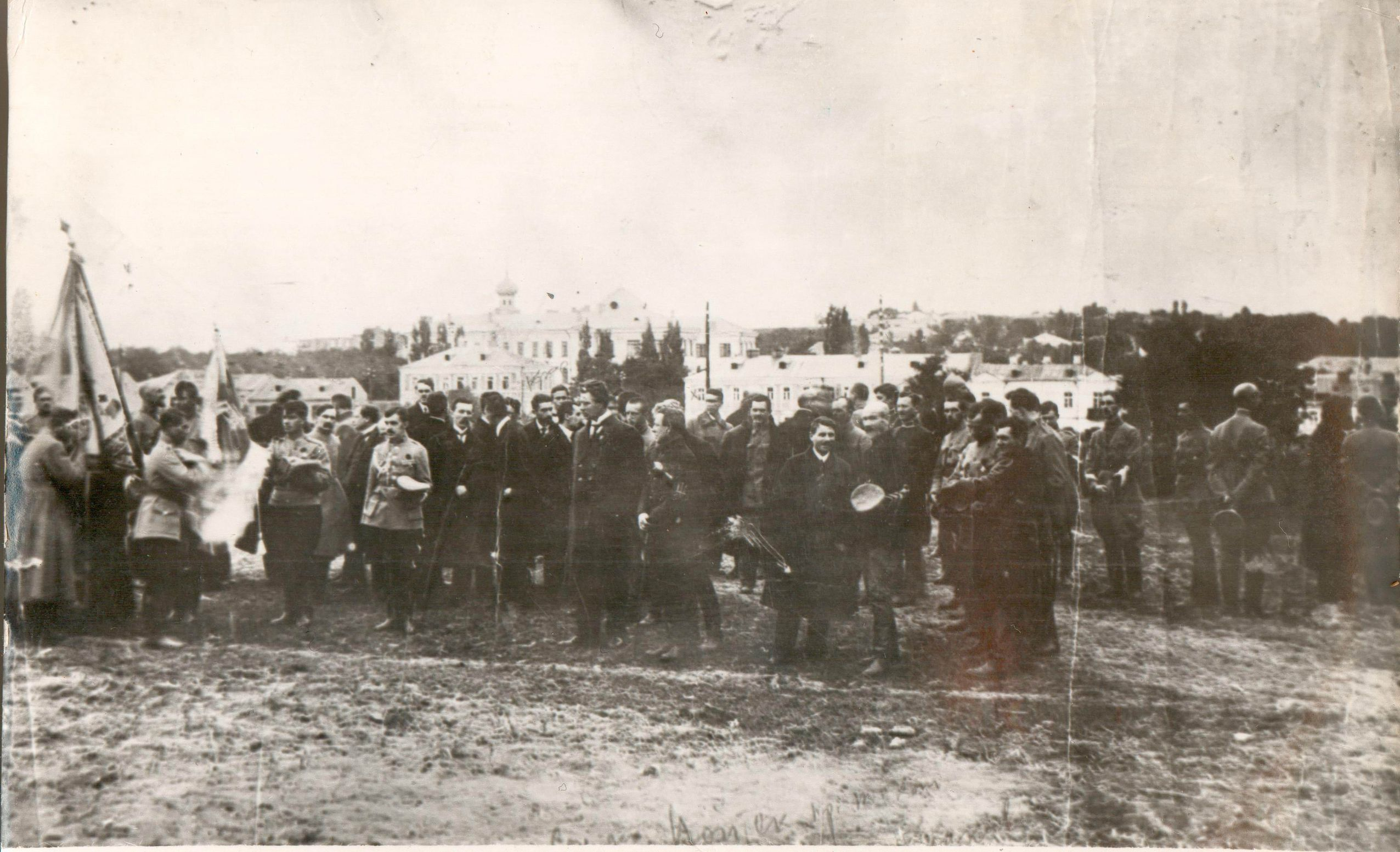
Pledge of allegiance by Cossacks of the Ukrainian army in Kamianets-Podilskyi, 1919

Then, Chekhivsky resigned from office, right after Vynnychenko created in Kamianets-Podilskyi the Committee for the salvation of Republic, which was again dissolved by Petliura on February 13. During that time the Soviet troops acquired the rest of the Kiev Governorate while the bands of Hryhoriv took Oleksandria and Yelyzavethrad. By March 6, the Directorate had relocated to Proskurov while yielding most of Polissia and Podillia to the Bolsheviks. Surprisingly, by the end of March the Ukrainian armies successfully conducted series of military operations retaking Sarny, Zhytomyr, Korosten, and threatening to take back Kiev. On March 2, Otaman Hryhoryev occupied Kherson and March 12 he was already in Mykolaiv. By April 3, the Entente forces evacuated from Odessa which Hryhoryev entered three days later. In early June, Ukraine launched an offensive, retaking the Podolia region.

==== July 1919–December 1919 ====
The Red Army retaliated against the Ukrainian offensive, recapturing Proskurov on 5 July and putting the temporary capital Kamianets-Podilskyi under threat. However, Ukraine was strengthened by the arrival of general Yurii Tiutiunnyk and his experienced troops. The Ukrainian Army launched a counterattack, pushing the Red Army back to Horodok. Troops of the Ukrainian Galician Army, who had crossed the Zbruch on 16–17 July, joined the fight against the Bolsheviks. Their arrival resulted in Ukraine having a combined force of 85,000 Ukrainian army regulars, and 15,000 partisans. The united Ukrainian armies possessed 335 artillery pieces, 1100 machine guns, two air regiments and numerous armoured trains and cars.

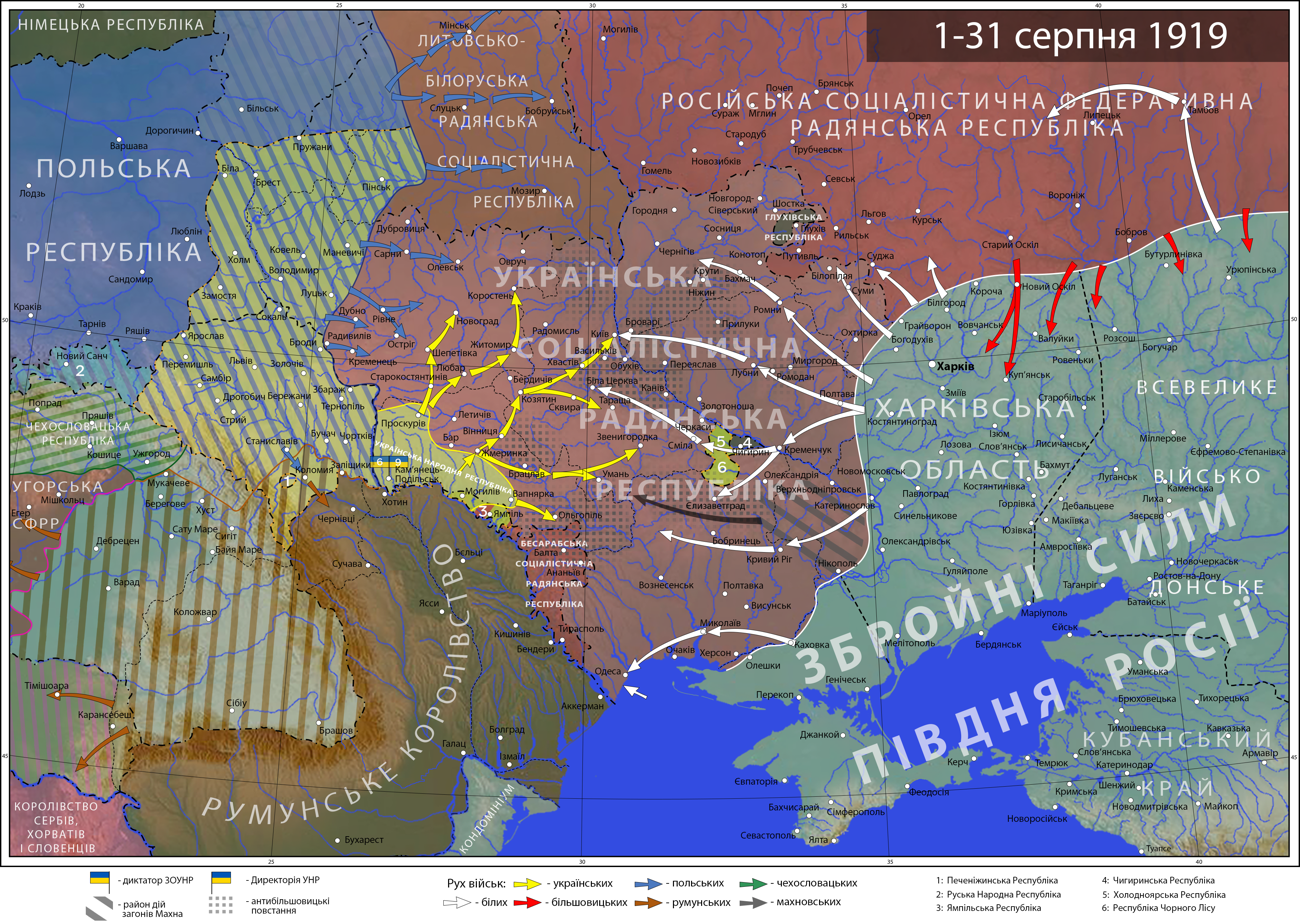
Simultaneous Ukrainian (yellow) and White advances on Kyiv during August 1919

After joining forces with the Galician Army, Ukrainian army command ordered a general offensive on Kyiv. On 12 August Ukrainian troops entered Vinnytsia, on 14 August - Starokostiantyniv, on 19 August - Berdychiv, and on 21 August reached Zhytomyr. On 30 August troops of the Zaporozhian Corps, headed by Volodymyr Salsky, liberated Kyiv. However, simultaneously with the entry of Ukrainian troops into their capital, on 31 August Anton Denikin's Volunteer Army established its positions in the city. After a standoff, Ukrainian troops were forced to retreat to the outskirts of Kyiv.

Taking advantage of the emerging conflict between Ukrainian troops and the Whites, the Bolsheviks transferred part of their forces from Katerynoslav to Zhytomyr. During that period a split emerged between the leadership of the Ukrainian People's Army and the Galician Army on the issue of their policy towards Denikin. An epidemic among the Ukrainian troops further exacerbated the situation. By October 1919, about 70% of the Directorate's troops and more than 90% of the allied Ukrainian Galician Army fell to typhus. Eventually, on 6 November 1919 the command of the Ukrainian Galician Army signed a separate peace with the Volunteer Army. Meanwhile the Bolsheviks made gains in Right-bank Ukraine, and the Polish army advanced from the west, so that by the end of November the Ukrainian army found itself surrounded from three sides. As a result, on 4 December 1919 a conference of its leadership decided to cease regular military operations and engage in underground partisan warfare.

==== December 1919–November 1920 ====
Lenin feared that a Polish offensive was incoming, and offered to accept the current frontline as a permanent border between Poland and Russia, which would include nearly all of Byelorussia going to Poland. However, Józef Piłsudski had greater ambitions, and he also made an agreement with Symon Petliura in Ukraine to exchange Galicia in return for a promise to force out communists in right-bank Ukraine.

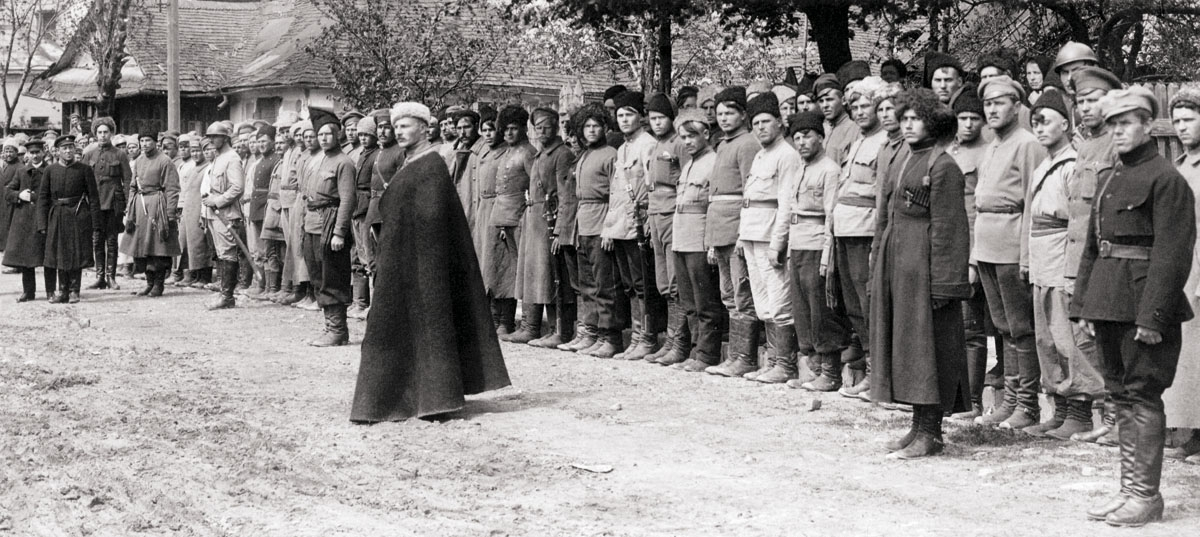
left Symon Petlura (far left) viewing Ukrainian troops in Kyiv, May 1920

From December 6, 1919, to May 6, 1920, the UNR Army under the command of Mykhailo Omelianovych-Pavlenko carried out an underground operation known as the First Winter Campaign in the Kirovohrad region against the Soviet 14th Army. Another significant development of this period was the signing of the Treaty of Warsaw with Poland on April 22, and then beginning of a joint offensive with Polish troops against the Bolsheviks. On May 7, a Ukrainian division under the command of Marko Bezruchko entered Kiev, but was quickly forced out by a Red Army counteroffensive led by Semyon Budyonny. The Ukrainians and Poles were pushed back across the Zbruch River and past Zamość toward Warsaw, but a counter-offensive pushed the Soviets to Minsk. The Poles signed an armistice with the Soviets on October 12.

By 1921, the Polish author of the Polish–Ukrainian alliance, Józef Piłsudski, was no longer the Polish head of state, and only participated as an observer during the Riga negotiations, which he called "an act of cowardice". Petliura's forces kept fighting. They lasted until October 21, when they were forced to cross the Zbruch River and enter Polish-controlled Galicia. There they were disarmed and placed in internment camps.

==== November 1921 ====
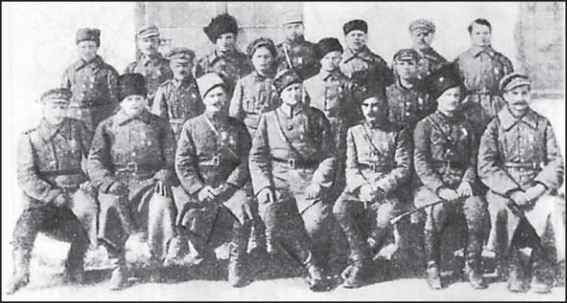
Ukrainian soldiers in Kalisz before Second Winter Campaign, 1921

The last action of the UNR against the Soviets was a raid behind the Red Army lines in November 1921 known as the Second Winter Campaign. This campaign was meant to incite a general uprising amongst the Ukrainian peasants, who were already disgruntled with the Soviets, and to unify partisan forces against the Bolsheviks in Ukraine. The commander of the Ukrainian forces was Yurii Tiutiunnyk.

Two expeditionary forces were established, one from Podolia (400 men) and one from Volhynia (800 men). The Podolia group only made it to the village of Vakhnivka, before returning to Polish territory through Volhynia on November 29. The Volhynia group started out on November 4, captured Korosten on November 7 and made its way to the village of Leonivka. When they began to run low on supplies they decided to return. However, on its return west, it was intercepted by a Bolshevik cavalry force under the command of Grigore Kotovski at Bazar and routed in battle near Mali Mynky on November 17. 443 soldiers were captured by the Soviets during the battle. 359 were shot on November 23 near the town of Bazar after refusing to defect to the Red Army, and 84 were passed on to Soviet security forces.

This was the last operation of the UNR Army against the Soviets. The end of the Second Winter Campaign brought the Ukrainian–Soviet war to a definite end, however, partisan fighting against the Bolsheviks continued until mid-1922, and in response, the Red Army terrorized the countryside.

==== Local uprisings ====
Local supporters of Ukrainian People's Republic created anti-Russian and anti-Bolshevik rebellion states on occupied territories, such as the Independent Medvyn Republic, as well as the Kholodny Yar Republic. They kept fighting with Russians and collaborators until 1923.

== Aftermath ==
Eastern Europe after the Treaty of Riga

The end of the war saw the incorporation of most of the territories of Ukraine into the Ukrainian Soviet Socialist Republic which, on December 30, 1922, was one of the founding members of the Union of Soviet Socialist Republics (USSR). Parts of Western Ukraine fell under the control of the Second Polish Republic, as laid out in the Peace of Riga. The UNR government, led by Symon Petlura, was forced into exile.

For the next few years, the Ukrainian nationalists would continue to try to wage a partisan guerrilla war on the Soviets. They were aided by Polish intelligence due to the project known as prometheism; however, they were not successful. The last active Ukrainian movements would be mostly eradicated during the Holodomor. Further, the relative lack of Polish support for the Ukrainian cause would cause a growing resentment on the part of the Ukrainian minority in Poland towards the Polish interwar state.

== See also ==
- List of states and regions involved in the Russian Civil War
- Bibliography of the Russian Revolution and Civil War
- Bibliography of Ukrainian history
- Outline of the Russian Revolution and Civil War
- Ukraine after the Russian Revolution
- Polish–Soviet War
- Polish–Ukrainian War
- Nestor Makhno
- Ukrainian Death Triangle
- Russo-Ukrainian War
- Russian invasion of Ukraine

== Bibliography ==
- Pipes, Richard (25 April 1997). The Formation of the Soviet Union: Communism and Nationalism, 1917–1923, Revised Edition. Harvard University Press. ISBN 978-0-674-41764-9.
