= Battle of Tarnopol =

Battle in the Polish–Ukrainian War

- Part of Polish–Ukrainian War
Date	14–15 June 1919
Location	Tarnopol (modern Ternopil), West Ukrainian People's Republic
Result	Ukrainian victory
Territorial changes	UGA seizes Tarnopol

Belligerents
West Ukrainian People's Republic	Second Polish Republic

Commanders and leaders
Oleksander Hrekov; Arnold Wolf; Myron Tarnavsky	Władysław Sikorski; Władysław Jędrzejewski

Units involved
I Corps; II Corps; III Corps; 9th separate UGA brigade	Several regiments, one death kuriń

Casualties and losses
Unknown	Heavy

The Battle of Tarnopol (Ukrainian: Битва за Тернопіль) was a battle that occurred on 14 June 1919 between the Ukrainian Galician Army led by general Oleksandr Hrekov and the Polish army. It was one of the biggest battles of the Chortkiv offensive.

== Background ==
After the November Uprising, the city became a part of the West Ukrainian People's Republic, from 23 November to 31 December, the WUPR government was located in the city. From 16 to 31 May, Tarnopol was a temporary capital of the Ukrainian People's Republic. On 1 June, Ukrainian government left the city, it was captured by the Polish Army. On 7 June, the Ukrainian Galician Army launched the Chortkiv offensive − most successful operation of the UGA. The units of Władysław Sikorski were defeated at Yahilnytsia and Chortkiv, following this the UGA fought successful battles at Jazłowiec and Buchach, after which the Polish army was forced to retreat towards Tarnopol.

== Battle ==
On 14 June 1919, 9th Brigade of the Ukrainian Galician Army led by Otaman Martynovych captured Skalat, 4 Polish kurens were forced to retreat to the Tarnopol. On the same day, Ukrainian 3rd Corps defeated the Polish army near Kozova on the west bank of the Strypa river and besieged Tovstobaby. At the same time, the 1st and 2nd Corps of the Ukrainian Army under the command of General Myron Tarnavsky were sent to capture Ternopil, a battle began, which turned out to be a victory of the Ukrainians. General Władysław Jędrzejewski attempted counterattack but was defeated by the soldiers from III corps of Arnold Wolf. Meanwhile, on 15 June, soldiers of the 10th brigade entered Tarnopol and captured it.

== Aftermath ==
Capture of the city ended the first phase of the Chortkiv offensive. On the same day after the battle, Ukrainian Galician Army captured Tovstobaby and the 1st Corps continued the offensive towards Krasne and Brody. In July 1919, the Polish army recaptured Tarnopol.

== Sources ==
- Diary of the Supreme Command of the Ukrainian Galician Army (PDF). New York: "Chervona Kalyna" Ukrainian Publications Cooperative. 1974.
