= Henryk Józewski =

Polish artist (1892–1981)

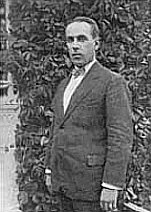
Henryk Józewski

Henryk Jan Józewski (August 6, 1892 - April 23, 1981) was a Polish visual artist, politician, a member of government of the Ukrainian People's Republic, later an administrator during the Second Polish Republic.

A member of Polish-independence organizations, during World War I he joined the Polish Military Organization (Polska Organizacja Wojskowa). An advocate of Polish-Ukrainian alliance and a friend of Symon Petlura, in 1920 he served as a member of the government of the Ukrainian People's Republic.

Józewski supported Józef Piłsudski's May 1926 coup d'état. He served as Minister of Internal Affairs twice in 1929-30; as voivode of Volhynian Voivodeship (1928–38); and as voivode of Łódź Voivodeship (1938–1939). As voivode of Wołyń, a region with a large Ukrainian minority, he advocated increased Ukrainian autonomy.

During World War II, Józewski served in the Polish resistance. Later he joined the anti-communist resistance and in 1953 was arrested by the Security Service. Released during the Polish October thaw in 1956, he resumed painting.

== Life ==
=== Early life ===
Born August 6, 1892, in Kiev, Kiev Governorate, in the Russian Empire, Józewski attended the city's schools, then studied mathematics and physics at the University of Kiev, graduating it in June 1914.

He was active in Polish cultural and pro-independence organizations. In 1905, while in high school, he joined such an organization and became the leader of one of its sections. In 1910 he founded his own organization, Związek Młodzieży Postępowo-Niepodległościowej (Youth Association for Progress and Independence). In 1915 he joined the Polish Military Organization (Polska Organizacja Wojskowa, or POW), a precursor of Polish intelligence, and soon became POW deputy commander in Kiev. Arrested by authorities, he was freed right after the February 1917 Revolution. Soon, Henryk Józewski returned to Kiev and resumed his activities with the POW once again.

Around that time, Józewski also began his painting career and married a fellow POW activist named Julia. In 1919 he moved from Kiev to Warsaw during the Polish-Soviet War. An advocate of the Polish-Ukrainian alliance, in April 1920 Józewski became deputy minister of internal affairs in the government of the Ukrainian People's Republic. During the Polish-Soviet War of 1919–1921, he traveled with Petlura's Ukrainian government to Kiev, later retreating with that government into exile in Polish Tarnów.

At war's end, with the Treaty of Riga having ended Piłsudski's hopes for a Międzymorze federation and an independent, pro-Polish Ukraine, Józewski returned to Warsaw, where he resumed his artistic career. He was a friend of novelist Maria Dąbrowska and of many of the Skamander poets. He also actively supported Petlura, whom he considered a friend and mentor; when the Soviet Union requested Petlura's extradition, Józewski engineered his "disappearance," secretly moving him from Tarnów to his own Warsaw apartment. Petlura would eventually leave Poland in December 1923.

=== In Polish government ===
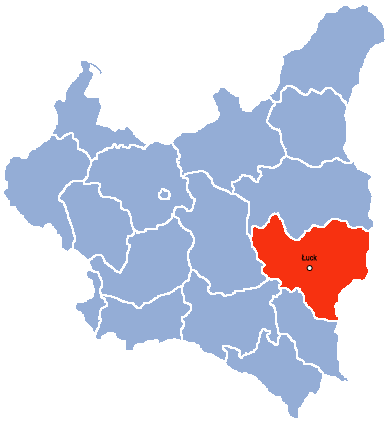
Wołyń Voivodeship

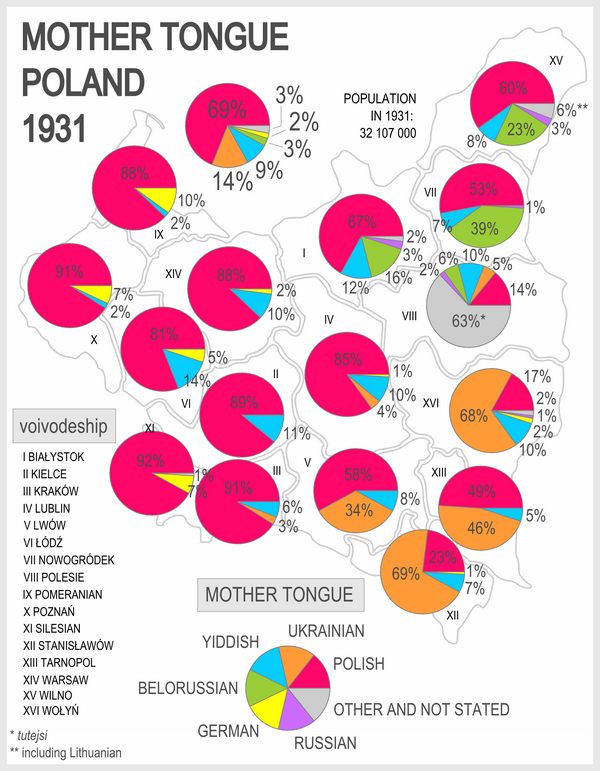
Languages of Poland, based on 1931 Polish census

Józewski actively supported Józef Piłsudski's May 1926 Coup d'État. In its aftermath he returned to politics, in August 1927 becoming a member of the government. In December 1928, he became voivode of Wołyń Voivodship. From December 29, 1929, to March 17, 1930, and again from March 29, 1930, to June 3, 1930, he served as Minister of Internal Affairs, then resumed his post as voivode of Wołyń. In 1923 he was decorated with the Virtuti Militari, and in 1929 with the Polonia Restituta.

As voivode of Wołyń, where Ukrainians formed the majority of the population, Józewski concentrated on improving relations between the Polish government and Poland's Ukrainian minority. He advocated a broad autonomy for Ukrainian self-governance, promoted Ukrainians to administrative posts, and sought to ensure their fair representation in the government. His administration included many former activists of the Ukrainian People's Republic. During his governing period, in Wolyn Voivodeship was established the Volhynian Ukrainian Association, a member of which was Mstyslav (Skrypnyk).

Józewski fostered Ukrainian and Polish-Ukrainian organizations. In education, he supported the teaching of the Ukrainian language and argued for the introduction of Ukrainian as the local official language. As Piłsudski, Józewski espoused a multicultural and multinational view. In Józewski's eyes, the modernization led by the Polish state would lead to a multinational province.

He declared that the Ukrainian national movement must choose between Poland and the Soviet Union. He opposed Soviet influences over Poland's Ukrainians and criticized certain Ukrainian organizations that he viewed as too Soviet-dependent or too extremist (e.g. Prosvita). However, due to the economic state of Poland during the Great Depression, local leaders were not replaced, so Ukrainian organizations were taken over by the state, but mostly run at a local level by the same people.

His efforts were greatly feared by Stalin, who was fearful that Wołyń would end up as a Piedmont to Ukrainian nationalism and engulf Soviet Ukraine.

After the 1935, death of Piłsudski, who had also favored finding peaceful solutions to the minorities problem, Józewski's influence waned, particularly as the National Democrats — much less open to treating with the minorities — gained sway in Polish politics. Józewski faced growing criticism from some quarters for allegedly being too Ukrainophilic. Finally, in 1938, he was moved to the office of voivode of Łódź Voivodeship, which had essentially no Ukrainian population.

=== Resistance fighter ===
With the German-Soviet invasion of Poland in September 1939, Józewski quickly — that October — became involved in forming a resistance movement. He was a member of the high command of Służba Zwycięstwu Polski (Service for Poland's Victory) and later became Warsaw commandant of Związek Walki Zbrojnej (Association for Armed Struggle), which in 1942 was transformed into Armia Krajowa (the Home Army). He co-founded the underground Polish weekly, Biuletyn Informacyjny (Information Bulletin), edited another underground publication, Polska Walczy (Poland Fights), and was one of the chief Polish underground publicists of the time.

With the westward advance of the Eastern Front and the end of the German occupation of Poland, Józewski joined the anti-communist resistance in Poland. Rather than himself becoming an anti-communist underground soldier, he continued as an underground publicist, writing and distributing anti-communist and anti-Soviet works. He evaded the Soviet NKVD and its counterpart, the Ministry of Public Security of Poland, but was arrested in March 1953. In September 1953 four scripts of Józewski prison memoirs had emerged, which he had written during his interrogation. The official interrogation protocols document that the communist state security apparatus invested time and resources in the cross-questioning of Józewski.

Charged with criminal, counter-revolutionary and anti-state activities, he was given a life sentence.

During the Polish October thaw of 1956, Józewski's sentence was reduced to 12 years, and eventually he was released from prison due to poor health. His sentence was further reduced to 5 years and finally vacated.

=== Last years ===
Józewski resumed painting, mainly landscapes and portraits. In 1958 he joined the Polish Association of Painters. Several of his paintings are displayed at the National Museum, Warsaw.

He died on April 23, 1981, and is buried at Warsaw's Powązki Cemetery. He was married in 1919 to Julia née Bolewska (1892–1939), artist-painter, liaison POW; the couple had no children.

== Political legacy ==
Ukrainian historiography does not regard Józewski as heroic figure, few Ukrainian historians have favorably considered the so called Polish compromisers, including Józewski. In Polish nationalism a resistance to Józewski's policy of national concession was entrenched from the outset. In the interwar period Józewski was despised by Poles of the Right.

== Honours and awards ==
Józewski Henry was awarded the Silver Cross of the Virtuti Militari (1923), Cross of Independence with Swords and the Commander's Cross of the Order of Polonia Restituta (1929).

== See also ==
- Międzymorze
- Prometheism
- Volhynia Experiment
- List of Poles
