= Oleksander Hrekiv =

Ukrainian general (1875–1958)

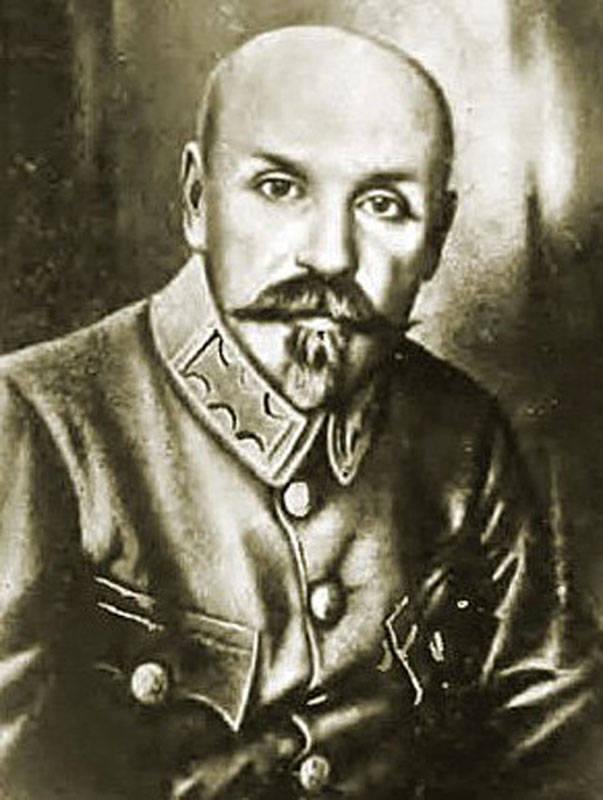
- Born: 4 December 1875; Sopych, Chernigov Governorate, Russian Empire
- Died: 2 December 1958 (aged 83); Vienna, Austria
- Military career
- Allegiance: Russian Empire (1905–1917); Ukrainian People's Republic (1917-1919); West Ukrainian People's Republic (1919–1921)
- Branch: Imperial Russian Army; Ukrainian Galician Army
- Service years: 1905–1921
- Rank: Major General; Otaman
- Conflicts: First World War; Ukrainian War of Independence; Polish-Ukrainian War; Chortkiv offensive; Battle of Buchach (1919); Battle of Tarnopol; Battle of Berezhany; Battle of Chortkiv; Battle of Jazłowiec

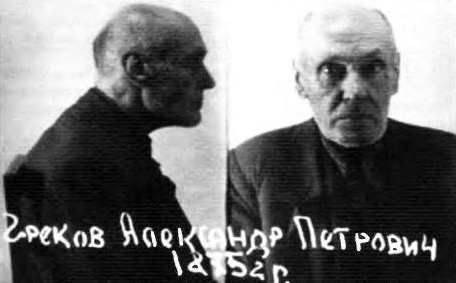
Oleksander Hrekiv after arrest by NKVD, 1948

Oleksander Petrovych Hrekov (Note: or Hrekov) (Ukrainian: Олександр Петрович Греків; 4 December 1875 – 2 December 1958) was a general of the Imperial Russian Army and Ukrainian People's Army. He was a commander-in-chief of the army of the West Ukrainian National Republic during the Polish-Ukrainian War and architect of the Chortkiv offensive in which the Ukrainian Galician Army advanced 120 km (75 mi) against the Polish army.

== Background ==
Hrekov was born into a Russian family whose estate was near Hlukhiv in Sopychi, Chernigov Governorate. Today most of the territory belongs to the village of Sopych, Hlukhiv Raion, on the border with the Russian Federation. His father Petro Havrylovych Hrekov was a lawyer and a large landowner of the Chernigov Governorate and his mother was Maria Hryhorivna Preobrazhenska. According to family legend, the Hrekov's family were descendants of a Greek who was part of the delegation accompanying Sophia Paleologue as she moved to Muscovy in 1472 when marrying Ivan III of Russia, Grand Prince of Moscow. The Hrekov family attained the status of nobility as a reward for their service to Peter the Great.

On the insistence of his father, Hrekov completed the law school of Lomonosov Moscow State University in 1897. Later, after surprising enrollment into the Moscow military school, he graduated it in 1899 and the Nicholas General Staff Academy in 1905 after three years of study (along with another Ukrainian general Volodymyr Sinclair).

== Career in the Russian Army ==
Beginning in 1905 Hrekov served in the Leib-Guard Egersky Regiment. From 1908 he taught political and military history at the military academy. Prior to World War I at first (1907) he served at the 3rd Grenadier Division (Moscow) and later (1908) relocated to Saint Petersburg to the 1st Guard Division. There Hrekov received his first award, the Order of Saint Stanislaus of III degree, as well as promotion to captain. Along with his military service the future general was giving lectures in the Pavel Infantry School (uchilishche). Since 1910 Hrekov worked at the headquarters of the Petersburg Military District. In 1910 he also received an assignment of the first adjutant of Guard forces, similar to the chief of Guard intelligence. One of his duties was working to protect the royal family of Nikolai II. In 1911 he was promoted to lieutenant colonel and received his second award, the Order of Saint Anna of III degree. In 1912 Hrekov defended his dissertation on the History of military art, becoming an extraordinary professor which today is a candidate of sciences. Hrekov also became a professor of the Military Art Department at Nikolas Academy General Staff. At the start of the First World War he was appointed as the chief of staff for the 74th Infantry Division which was stationed at the rear. There Hrekov met with another future Ukrainian general Mykola Yunakiv. After a request to send him to the frontlines, Hrekov was appointed as the chief of staff for the 1st Guard Division. In 1915 he was promoted to colonel. In April 1917 he distinguished himself in fighting near Tarnopol and was awarded the Order of St. George of IV degree. The same year Hrekov was promoted to general.

== Career in the Ukrainian Army ==
Following the October Revolution, and the end to both the Empire and the Provisional Government, in December 1917 he came to serve Ukraine. His first assignment was as the commander of the 2nd Serdyuk Division which was only starting to form and at that time consisted of a small officer corps. One of Hrekov's first remarkable subordinates on the side of the Ukrainian People's Army was Colonel Petro Bolbochan. At one time the Soviet Prime-Minister Vladimir Lenin was offering 50,000 rubles in silver for the head of colonel Bolbochan. During the same time Hrekov was appointed the chief of the Kyiv Military District and was partially involved in the formation of the Sich Riflemen Halych-Bukovyna Kurin (Battalion) led by Yevhen Konovalets. The unit became the main supporter of the Central Rada and Mykhailo Hrushevsky. After the fall of Kyiv early in 1918 Hrekov retired from the Ukrainian People's Army. From December 1918 until January 1919 he was assigned to undertake negotiations with French forces occupying Odessa on behalf of the Directorate of Ukraine. After a conflict with Petliura and leftist Ukrainian politicians, he was forced to resign his post and on 16 May 1919 assumed command of the Ukrainian Galician Army offered to him by Yevhen Petrushevych.

The Galician army, faced against the better equipped the Heller's Army, was pushed from Lviv all the way to Husyatyn at Zbruch river. Hrekov's presence there electrified the Galician soldiers, who were on the verge of defeat at the hands of the Poles during their war against them; many veterans of that war recalled the period under his command as the high point of their war experience. Under Hrekov's command, between 9 June and 5 July the army of the West Ukrainian People's Republic experienced its greatest success during the Chortkiv offensive, when the Poles were thrown back over 200 km (124 mi). Soon, however, the Polish forces were able to recover half of their yielded territory and stabilize the frontlines. As a result, Hrekov became quite popular among the Ukrainians of eastern Galicia. Following a conflict with the leadership of the West Ukrainian National Republic (it is rumored that the head of the West Ukrainian National Republic was pressured by Petliura to let Hrekov go, because Petliura feared Hrekov's popularity and disliked his opposition to Petliura's socialist policies) Hrekov and his family left for Romania in July 1919.

== Life in exile ==
In 1920 he moved to Vienna. While there, he edited the journal "Ukraina" but adopted a pro-Polish orientation that discredited him in the eyes of much of the Ukrainian émigré community. In the 1930s he became close to a circle of Russian émigrés but at the end of that decade returned to the Ukrainian community, where he tried in vain to create an organization of "Ukrainian Cossacks". Arrested by the Soviet occupation authorities in 1948 he was taken to Lukyanivska Prison in Kyiv, he was exiled to the Ozerlag camp of the Gulag before being released in 1956, whereupon he returned to Vienna.

Currently a street in Lviv is named after Hrekov.

== Personal life ==
Oleksander Hrekov married Natalia Ivanivna Kabat in 1905, the daughter of a Hofmeister of the Higher Court, a secret adviser and senator. His wife's family was of Hungarian descent. They had a son Oleh (1914–1942) and a daughter Yelyzaveta (1906-?).

Hrekov had two sisters, Anna and Yulia, as well as three brothers: Kostiantyn who became an attorney, Hryhoriy who was a military officer, and Mykola who was an engineer and railway specialist.

== Honours and awards ==
- Order of St. Vladimir, 3rd and 4th classes
- Order of Saint George, 4th class
- Order of St. Stanislaus, 2nd and 3rd classes
- Order of St. Anne, 3rd and 4th classes

Preceded by Oleksandr Slyvynsky	General Bulava; Otaman	Succeeded by Oleksander Osetsky
Preceded by General Osetsky	Minister of Defense; 1919–February 1919	Succeeded by Oleksandr Shapoval

== On-line articles ==
- (in Ukrainian) Encyclopedia of Ukraine
- General Oleksander Hrekov (Ukrainian)
- Biography (Russian)
- Biography (Russian)
- Fate of General Hrekov (Ukrainian)
- (in Ukrainian) Video report about Hrekov's biography on YouTube
