= Treaty of Warsaw (1920) =

1920 alliance between Poland and Ukraine

Polish: Umowa warszawska Ukrainian: Варшавський договір
- Type: Bilateral political treaty (Military alliance)
- Signed: 21 April 1920 (24 April 1920)
- Location: Warsaw, Poland
- Effective: when signed
- Condition: Recognition of independence of the Ukrainian People's Republic by Poland; Providing military support by Ukraine to Poland; Recognizing of Poland-Ukraine border along Zbruch as international
- Expiration: Signing of the Peace of Riga
- Parties: Poland; Ukraine

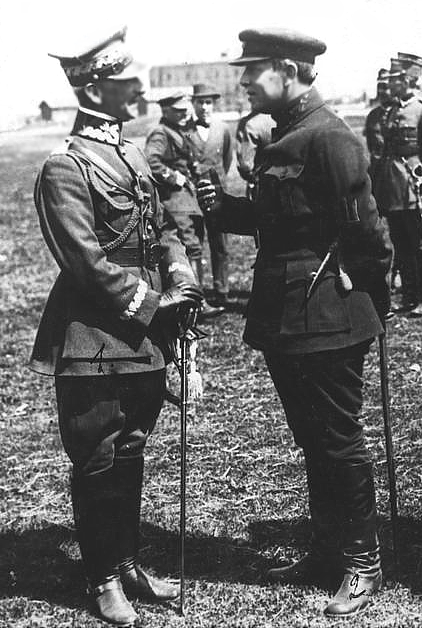
Polish General Antoni Listowski (left) and exiled Ukrainian leader Symon Petliura (second from left) following Petliura's alliance with the Poles.

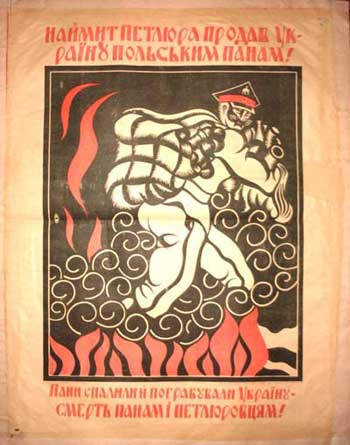
Soviet Ukrainian propaganda poster issued following the Petliura–Piłsudski alliance. The Ukrainian text reads: "Corrupt Petliura has sold Ukraine to the Polish landowners. Landowners burned and plundered Ukraine. Death to landowners and Petlurovites."

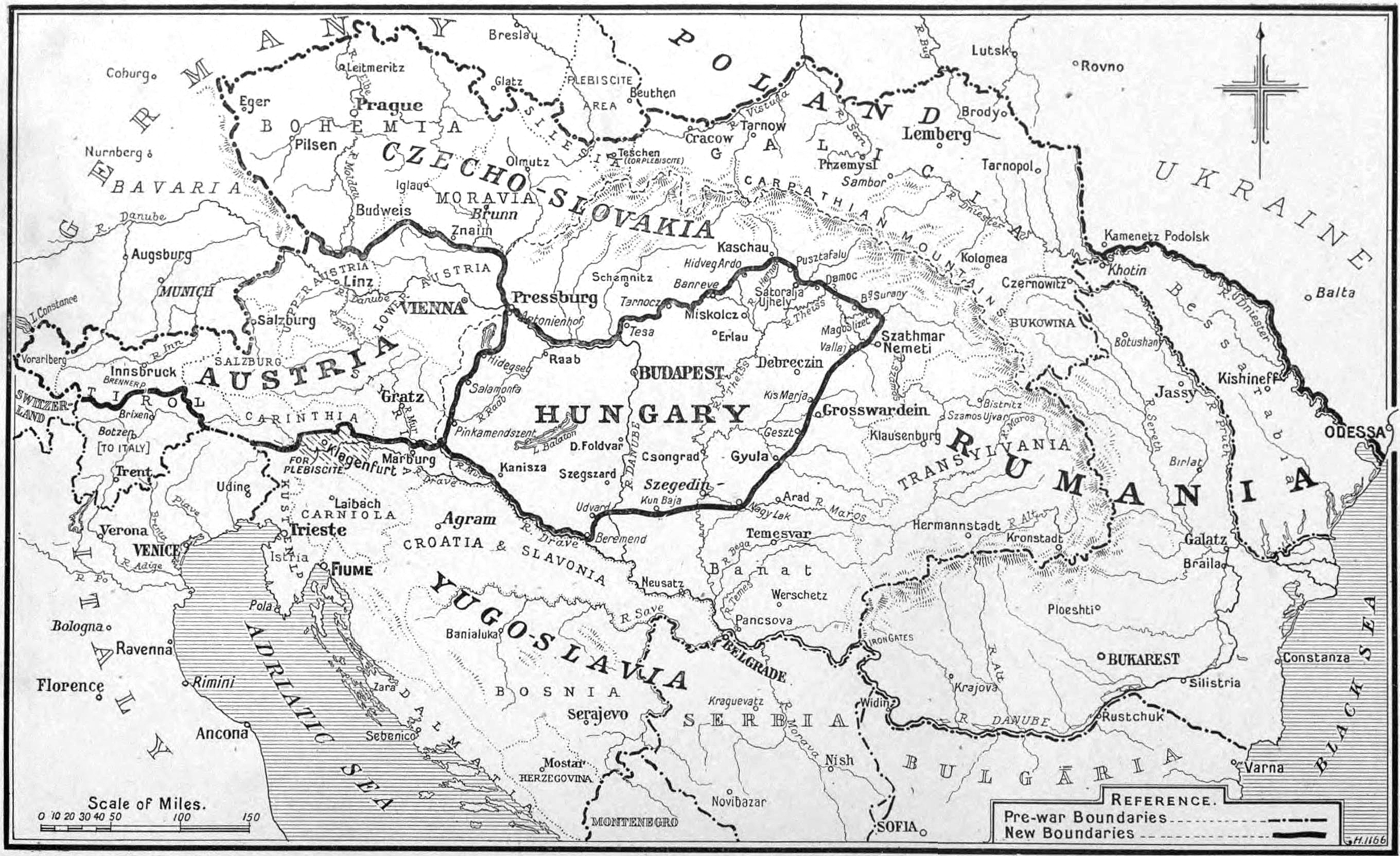
Dissolved Austria-Hungary in 1919 with Ukraine to its east

The Treaty of Warsaw (also the Polish–Ukrainian or Petliura–Piłsudski Alliance or Agreement) of April 1920 was a military-economical alliance between the Second Polish Republic, represented by Józef Piłsudski, and the Ukrainian People's Republic, represented by Symon Petliura, against Bolshevik Russia. The treaty was signed on 21 April 1920, with a military addendum on 24 April.

The alliance was signed during the Polish-Soviet War, just before the Polish Kiev offensive. Piłsudski was looking for allies against the Bolsheviks and hoped to create a Międzymorze alliance; Petliura saw the alliance as the last chance to create an independent Ukraine.

The treaty had no permanent impact. The Polish-Soviet War continued and the territories in question were distributed between Russia and Poland in accordance with the 1921 Peace of Riga. Territories claimed by the Ukrainian national movement were split between the Ukrainian SSR in the east and Poland in the west (Galicia and part of Volhynia).

== Background ==
The Polish leader Józef Piłsudski was trying to create a Poland-led alliance of East European countries, the Międzymorze federation, designed to strengthen Poland and her neighbors at the expense of the Russian Empire, and later of the Russian SFSR and the Soviet Union. His plan was however plagued with setbacks, as some of his planned allies refused to cooperate with Poland, and others, while more sympathetic, preferred to avoid conflict with the Bolsheviks. But in April 1920, from a military standpoint, Polish army needed to strike at the Soviets, to disrupt their plans for an offensive of their own. Piłsudski also wanted an independent Ukraine to be a buffer between Poland and Russia rather than seeing Ukraine again dominated by Russia right at the Polish border. Piłsudski, who argued that "There can be no independent Poland without an independent Ukraine", may have been more interested in Ukraine being split from Russia than he was in Ukrainians' welfare. As such, Piłsudski turned to Petliura, whom he originally had not considered high on his planned allies list.

At the end of June 1919, the Treaty of Versailles was signed, in which Germany withdrew from the Treaty of Brest-Litovsk. The Ukrainian People's Republic, led by Petliura, suffered mounting attacks on its territory since early 1919, and by April 1920 most of Ukrainian territory was outside its control.

In such conditions, Józef Piłsudski had little difficulty in convincing Petliura to join the alliance with Poland despite recent conflict between the two nations that had been settled in favour of Poland the previous year.

== The treaty ==
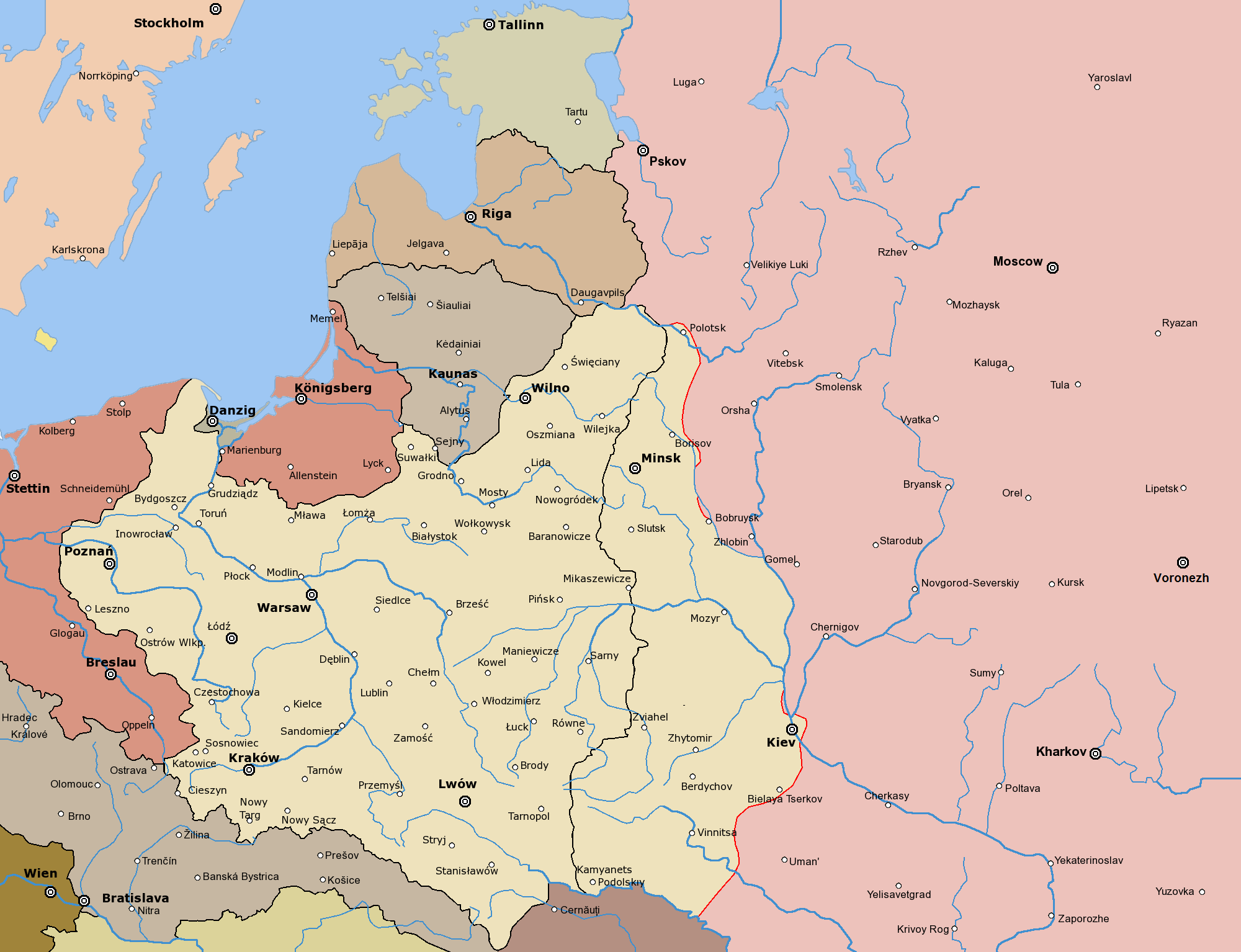
Polish–Ukrainian Kiev offensive at its height, June 1920—just before the Soviet counteroffensive would retake Ukraine and approach the Polish capital, Warsaw, itself.

The treaty was signed on 21 April in Warsaw (it was signed at night 01:40 LST from 21 onto 22, but it was dated as of 21 April 1920). In exchange for agreeing to a border along the Zbruch River, recognizing Poland's annexation of western Ukraine, which included Galicia as well as the western portions of Volhynian Governorate, Kholm Governorate, and other territories (Article II), Poland recognized the Ukrainian People's Republic as an independent state (Article I) with borders as defined by Articles II and III and under ataman Petliura's leadership.

A separate provision in the treaty prohibited both sides from concluding any international agreements against each other (Article IV). Ethnic Poles within the Ukrainian border, and ethnic Ukrainians within the Polish border, were guaranteed the same rights within their states (Article V). Unlike their Russian counterparts, whose lands were to be distributed among the peasants, Polish landlords in Ukraine were accorded special treatment until a future legislation would be passed by Ukraine that would clarify the issue of Polish landed property in Ukraine (Article VI). Further, an economic treaty was drafted, significantly tying Polish and Ukrainian economies; Ukraine was to grant significant concessions to the Poles and the Polish state.

The treaty was followed by a formal military alliance signed by general Volodymyr Sinkler and Walery Sławek on 24 April. Petliura was promised military help in regaining the control of Bolshevik-occupied territories with Kiev, where he would again assume the authority of the Ukrainian People's Republic. The Ukrainian republic was to subordinate its military to Polish command and provide the joint armies with supplies on Ukrainian territories; the Poles in exchange promised to provide equipment for the Ukrainians.

On the same day as the military alliance was signed (24 April), Poland and UPR forces began the Kiev Operation, aimed at securing the Ukrainian territory for Petliura's government thus creating a buffer for Poland that would separate it from Russia. Sixty-five thousand Polish and fifteen thousand Ukrainian soldiers took part in the initial expedition. After winning the battle in the south, the Polish General Staff planned a speedy withdrawal of the 3rd Army and strengthening of the northern front in Belarus where Piłsudski expected the main battle with the Red Army to take place. The Polish southern flank was to be held by Polish-allied Ukrainian forces under a friendly government in Ukraine.

== Importance ==
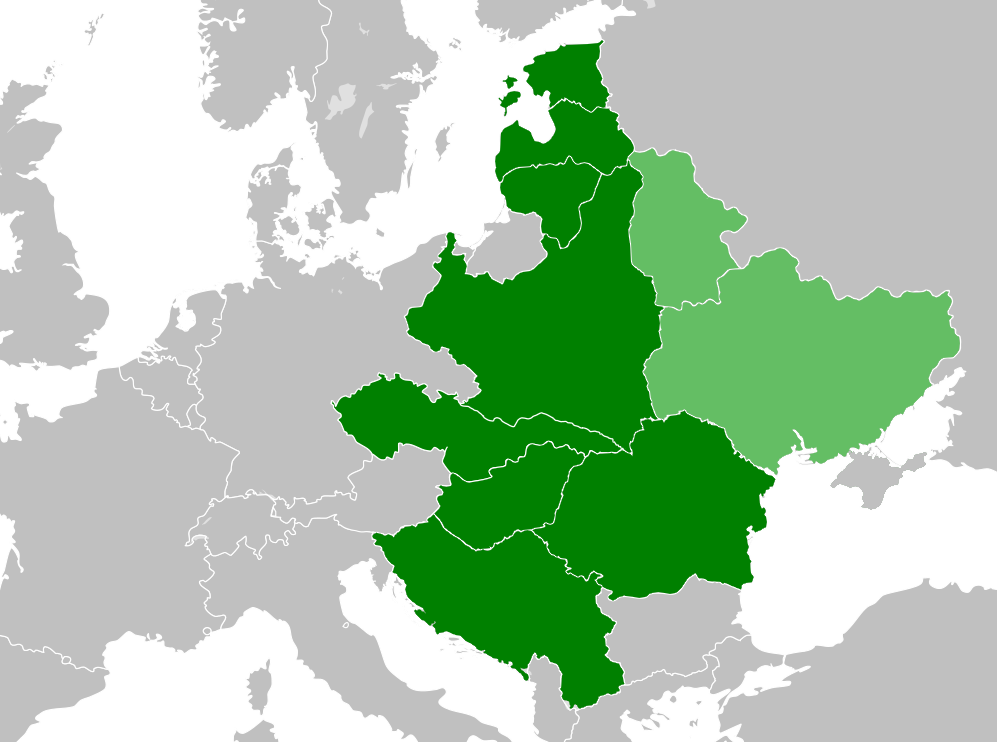
Proposed Międzymorze federation. Lighter green denotes Ukrainian and Belarusian territories controlled after 1921 by the Soviet Union.

For Piłsudski, this alliance gave his campaign for the Międzymorze federation the legitimacy of joint international effort, secured part of the Polish eastward border, and laid a foundation for a Polish dominated Ukrainian state between Russia and Poland. For Petliura, this was a final chance to preserve the statehood and, at least, the theoretical independence of the Ukrainian heartlands, even while accepting the loss of Western Ukrainian lands to Poland.

== Aftermath ==
The final borders layout settled by the Polish-Soviet War, splitting Ukraine between Poland and the Soviet Union.

Both Piłsudski and Petliura were criticized by other factions within their governments and nations. Piłsudski faced stiff opposition from Dmowski's National Democrats who opposed Ukrainian independence; Petliura, in turn, was criticized by many Ukrainian politicians for entering a pact with the Poles and giving up on Western Ukraine. Mykhailo Hrushevsky, the highly respected chairman of the Central Council, also condemned the alliance with Poland and Petliura's claim to have acted on the behalf of the UPR. In general, many Ukrainians viewed a union with Poles with great suspicion, especially in the view of historically difficult relationships between the nations, and the alliance received an especially dire reception from Galicia Ukrainians who viewed it as their betrayal; their attempted state, the West Ukrainian People's Republic, had been defeated by July 1919 and was now to be incorporated into Poland. The Western Ukrainian political leader, Yevhen Petrushevych, who expressed fierce opposition to the alliance, left for exile in Vienna. The remainder of the Ukrainian Galician Army, the Western Ukrainian state's defence force, still counted 5,000 able fighters though devastated by a typhus epidemic, joined the Bolsheviks on 2 February 1920 as the transformed Red Ukrainian Galician Army. Later, the Galician forces would turn against the Communists and join Petliura's forces when sent against them, resulting in mass arrests and disbandment of the Red Galician Army.

On April 26, in his "Call to the People of Ukraine", Piłsudski assured that "the Polish army would only stay as long as necessary until a legal Ukrainian government took control over its own territory". Despite this, many Ukrainians were just as anti-Polish as anti-Bolshevik, and resented the Polish advance, which many viewed as just a new variety of occupation considering previous defeat in the Polish–Ukrainian War. Thus, Ukrainians also actively fought the Polish invasion in Ukrainian formations of the Red Army. Some scholars stress the effects of Soviet propaganda in encouraging negative Ukrainian sentiment towards the Polish operation and Polish–Ukrainian history in general.

The alliance between Piłsudski and Petliura resulted in 15,000 allied Ukrainian troops supporting Poles at the beginning of the campaign, increasing to 35,000 through recruitment and desertion from the Soviet side during the war. This number, however, was much smaller than expected, and the late alliance with Poland failed to secure Ukraine's independence, as Petliura did not manage to gather any significant forces to help his Polish allies.

On 7 May, during the course of the Kiev offensive, the Pilsudski-Petliura alliance took the city. Anna M. Cienciala writes: "However, the expected Ukrainian uprising against the Soviets did not take place. Ukraine was ravaged by war; also, most of the people were illiterate and had not developed their own national consciousness. Finally, they distrusted the Poles, who had formed a large part of the landowning class in Ukraine up to 1918."

The divisions within the Ukrainian factions themselves, with many opposing Poles just as they opposed the Soviets, further reduced the recruitment to the pro-Polish Petliurist forces. In the end, Petliurist forces were unable to protect the Polish southern flank and stop the Soviets, as Piłsudski hoped; Poles at that time were falling back before the Soviet counteroffensive and were unable to protect Ukraine from the Soviets by themselves.

The Soviets retook Kiev in June. Petliura's remaining Ukrainian troops were defeated by the Soviets in November 1920, and by that time the Poles and the Soviets had already signed an armistice and were negotiating a peace agreement. After the Polish-Soviet Peace of Riga next year, Ukrainian territory found itself split between the Ukrainian SSR in the east, and Poland in the west (Galicia and part of Volhynia). Piłsudski felt the agreement was a shameless and short-sighted political calculation. Allegedly, having walked out of the room, he told the Ukrainians waiting there for the results of the Riga Conference: "Gentlemen, I deeply apologize to you". Over the coming years, Poland would provide some aid to Petliura's supporters in an attempt to destabilize Soviet Ukraine (see Prometheism), but it could not change the fact that Polish–Ukrainian relations would continue to steadily worsen over the interwar period. One month before his death Piłsudski told his aide: "My life is lost. I failed to create the free from the Russians Ukraine".

== See also ==
- Georgian–Polish alliance
- Intermarium
- Kiev offensive (1920)
- Polish–Romanian alliance
- Prometheism
- Volhynia Experiment
