= Battle of Buchach (1919) =

- Part of Polish–Ukrainian War and Chortkiv offensive
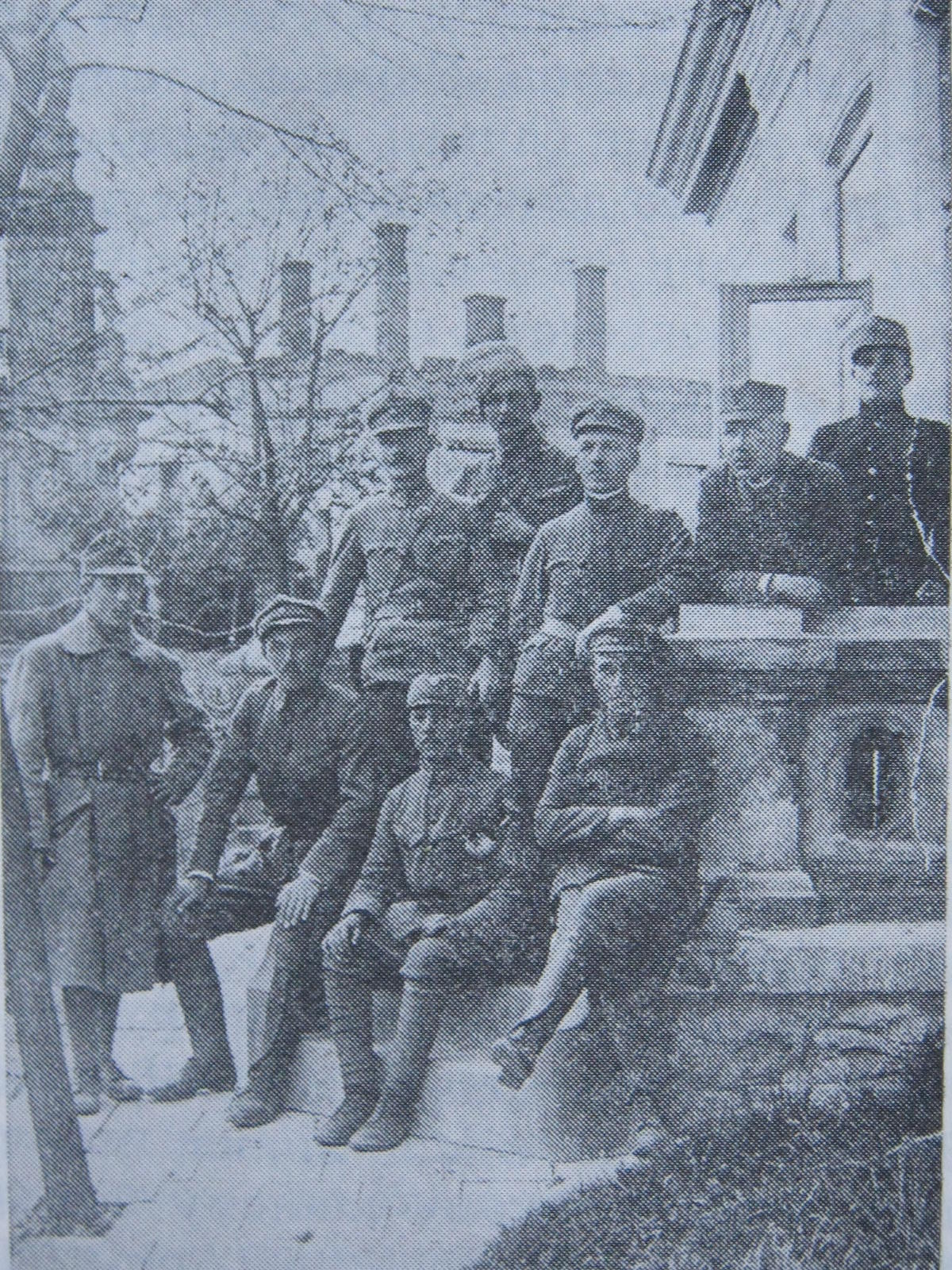
- UGA soldiers in Buchach
Date	10–11 or June 12, 1919
Location	Buchach, West Ukrainian People's Republic
Result	Ukrainian victory

Belligerents
West Ukrainian People's Republic	Poland

Commanders and leaders
Oleksander Hrekov; Alfred Schamanek; Volodymyr Galan; Arnold Wolf	Franciszek Aleksandrowicz

Casualties and losses
Unknown	Lots of POWs, several machine guns captured

Battle of Buchach (Ukrainian: Битва за Бучач) was a battle fought between the Ukrainian Galician Army under the leadership of general Oleksander Hrekov and Polish forces during the Chortkiv offensive and Polish-Ukrainian war which lasted from June 10 to 11, 1919. Ukrainian forces managed to liberate Buchach and Monastyrysk, while the Polish army retreated to Ternopil.

== Prelude ==
After the Polish May offensive, two-thirds of the Ukrainian Galician Army was destroyed and most of Galicia and Volhynia were captured by Poland. The commander of UHA, Mykhailo Omelianovych-Pavlenko was preparing UHA to cross the Zbruch river and retreat from Galicia. However, on June 7, UHA began the Chortkiv offensive. On June 8, Ukrainians defeated Polish forces at the battles of Yahilnytsia and Chortkiv.

== Battle ==
As of June 9, 1919, there was one regiment each of the 17th, 18th, and 42nd Polish regiments from the group of General Franciszek Aleksandrowicz in Buchach. On June 10, 1919, the battle for the city began. Near the village of Soroky, the Polish forces were decisively defeated by Ukrainians, which allowed the units of the Ukrainian II Corps to approach the city. One of the Ukrainian units entered Buchach while being unnoticed by the Poles. On June 11, the Poles tried to counterattack but were defeated. After that, the Poles began retreating to Pidhaytsi and Nyzhniv. Noticing this, Ukrainian forces under the command of Arnold Wolf started intense attacks that led to the capture of the city by UHA at the same day.

== Aftermath ==
The Polish army was forced to retreat to Ternopil. After the battle, the High Commandership of the Ukrainian Galician Army (Ukrainian: Начальна команда Української Галицької Армії) moved to Buchach.

== Bibliography ==
- Diary of the Supreme Command of the Ukrainian Galician Army (PDF). New York: "Chervona Kalyna" Ukrainian Publications Cooperative. 1974.
