= Oleksander Osetsky =

Russian and Ukrainian general (1873–1937)

- Олександр Осецький
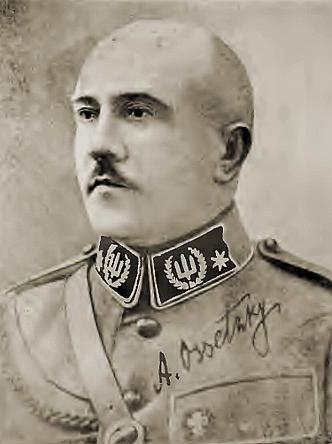
- Oleksander Osetsky
- Born: 24 June 1873; Kremenets, Volhynian Governorate, Russian Empire (now Ternopil Oblast, Ukraine)
- Died: 26 February 1937 (aged 63); Paris, France
- Military career
- Allegiance: Russian Empire; Ukrainian People's Republic; Ukrainian State
- Branch: Infantry
- Service years: 1892-1917 (Imperial Russian Army); 1917-1921 (Ukrainian People's Republic/Ukrainian State)
- Rank: Major general (RIA); Otaman (UNR)

Oleksander Viktorovych Osetsky (Ukrainian: Олександр Вікторович Осецький; Russian: Александр Викторович Осецкий; 24 June 1873 – 16 February 1937) was a Russian and Ukrainian military officer. A general in the Imperial Russian Army, after the Russian Revolution he joined the army of the Ukrainian People's Republic (UNR).

From 1914 to 1918, during the First World War, he served in and commanded a regiment in the Imperial Russian Army and reached the rank of major general. When the Russian Revolution broke out in 1917, he joined the UNR Army. He served as a commander in the Poltava region, commander of a Railroad Guard Corps under the Hetman government, and commander of the Kholm Group on the Polish front in 1919, during the Polish-Ukrainian War. From December 1918 to January 1919 he was minister of defense of the Ukrainian People's Republic, and then the UNR Army otaman. In 1920, he headed a UNR military-diplomatic mission to Belgium. He emigrated to France and died in Paris in 1937.

Preceded by Oleksander Hrekov	General Bulava; Deputy Chief Otaman ? - August 1919	Succeeded by Mykola Yunakiv
Preceded by D.Shchutsky	Minister of Defense; December 1918–1919	Succeeded by General Hrekov
