= Mykola Yunakiv =

Ukrainian general (1871–1931)

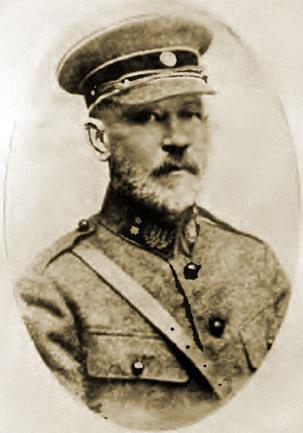
- Born: 6 December 1871; Chuguev, Kharkov Governorate, Russian Empire
- Died: 1 August 1931 (aged 59); Tarnów, Poland
- Military career
- Allegiance: Russian Empire; Ukrainian People's Republic
- Branch: (Russian Empire) Imperial Russian Army; Ukrainian People's Army
- Service years: (Russian Empire) 1894—1917; 1917—1921
- Rank: General
- Unit: 4th Army
- Commands: (Russian Empire) 8th Army; Supreme Military Council of Ukraine
- Conflicts: World War I; Romanian campaign; Russian Civil War

Mykola Yunakiv (Ukrainian: Микола Леонтійович Юнаків; 6 December 1871 Chuguev, Kharkov Governorate – 1 August 1931 Tarnów, Poland) was a Ukrainian general, military pedagogue. He was a general in the army of the Russian Empire and the Ukrainian People's Republic.

Yunakiv finished the Nicholas General Staff Academy in Saint Petersburg (1894–1897). In 1910 he defended his dissertation on the Swedish campaign in Ukraine 1708-1709 and year later became a professor of a military history. In 1914 Yunakiv was pressured to resign after his implementation of teaching reforms found no support in the academy.

During World War I Yunakiv was appointed as a chief of staff serving for the Russian 4th Army and later a commander of the 8th Army fighting on the Romanian Front. In a critical period in the history of the Ukrainian People's Republic in December 1917 he joined the Ukrainian military administration as a head of the education department.

In August 1919 he was appointed as a chief of joint staff for both the Ukrainian armies during the counter advance onto Kiev and Odessa. On 10 October 1919 Yunakiv was promoted to Major General and during the following year briefly served as minister of defense and as head of the Supreme Military Council of Ukraine. Later he emigrated to Poland where he was a member of the Ukrainian Military History Society and the editorial collective of Za derzhavnist’.

Preceded by Oleksander Osetsky	General Bulawa; Deputy Chief Otaman; August 1919 - end 1919	Succeeded by Volodymyr Sinclair
Preceded by V.Salsky	Minister of Defense; 1920	Succeeded by ?
