= Volodymyr Sinclair =

Ukrainian military leader

Volodymyr Oleksandrovych Sinkler
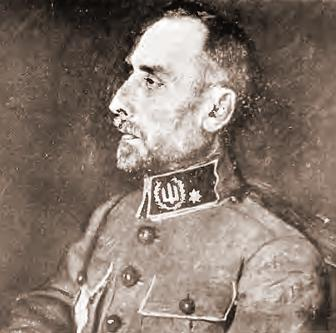
- Born: 12 January 1879; Margilan, Fergana Oblast, Russian Empire
- Died: 16 March 1946 (aged 67); Kiev, Soviet Union
- Military career
- Allegiance: Russian Empire (1905-1917); Ukrainian People's Army
- Branch: Ukrainian People's Army
- Service years: 1904–1921
- Rank: Major General, Quartermaster General
- Units: Company of the Leib-Guard Pavlov Regiment; 176th Perevoloka Regiment of the 37th Infantry Division; Chief of staff for the 2nd Guard Corps acting Chief of Staff for the Ukrainian People's Army (end of 1919); Chief of Staff for the Ukrainian People's Army (March–July 1920)
- Commands: General Bulawa; Supreme Military Rada (1921)
- Conflicts: Russo-Japanese War; World War I Ukrainian–Soviet War
- Awards: Order of Saint Stanislaus, Order of Saint Anna, Order of Saint Vladimir

Volodymyr Oleksandrovych Sinkler or Vladimir Sinclair (Ukrainian: Володимир Олександрович Сінклер) (12 January 1879 – 16 March 1946) was a Ukrainian military leader, general of the Russian Imperial Army, and general of the Ukrainian People's Army.

Volodymyr Sinclair was born in the city of Margilan (present-day Uzbekistan) the former city of Kokand Khanate. Margilan became the uyezd center of the newly established Fergana Oblast in the Russian Turkestan around 1875. The Sinclair family were of the Swedish descent that left the Great Britain after the Glorious Revolution of 1688 and pledged allegiance to Alexis of Russia. Sinclair's father was a military engineer.

Volodymyr studied at the Nepliuyevsky cadet corps and later at Mikhailov Artillery Academy in Orenburg, Russia. After short service at the head of an artillery detachment went to study at the prestigious Artillery Academy of the General Staff along with Oleksander Hrekov with whom he joined the General Staff (General Bulawa) of the Ukrainian People's Army. After graduation with distinction went to serve at different positions in St.Petersburg — served as staff officer and aide-de-camp. Throughout his career Sinclair mostly served as a staff-officer.

During World War I first served as regimental Chief of Staff and later commanded a Russian infantry regiment. Awarded the title of major-general, and the Order of Saint Stanislaus, 2nd and 3rd class; the Order of St. Anne, 2nd and 3rd class; the Order of St. Vladimir, 3rd and 4th class with swords.

After the October Revolution went to serve in the General Staff of the Ukrainian People's Army (UNR). In 1918 was promoted to Quartermaster General. During the Hetmanate and the Directorate he continued to serve in the General Staff, playing an important role in capture of Kiev from Bolsheviks in 1919. At the end of 1919 became Chief of General Staff. In 1920 headed Ukrainian delegation in negotiations with Poland, which resulted in the Treaty of Warsaw.

After the military defeat of the Army of UNR retired and settled in Eastern Poland, participated in the life of the local Ukrainian community. At the end of Second World War with the advance of the Red Army was arrested by NKVD and interned to Kiev. Died in Lukyanivska Prison.

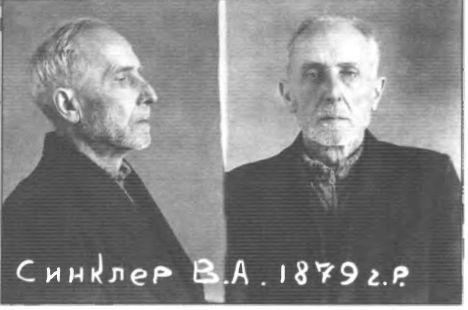
Volodymyr Sinkler, 1945, NKVD, Lukyanivska Prison
