= Volhynia Experiment =

Polish interwar Ukrainian tolerance program

The Volhynia Experiment (Ukrainian: Волинський експеримент, romanized: Volyns'kyy eksperyment) was a cultural and political program, by the interwar Polish government, in Wołyń Province whose purpose was to create a Ukrainian identity that was also loyal to the Polish state. It was hoped that this program would, furthermore, lead to pro-Polish sympathies in Soviet Ukraine and serve as a potential aid to Polish plans concerning the Soviet Union.

The Wołyń Experiment was opposed both by Ukrainian nationalists in neighboring Galicia and by pro-Soviet communists.

== Background ==
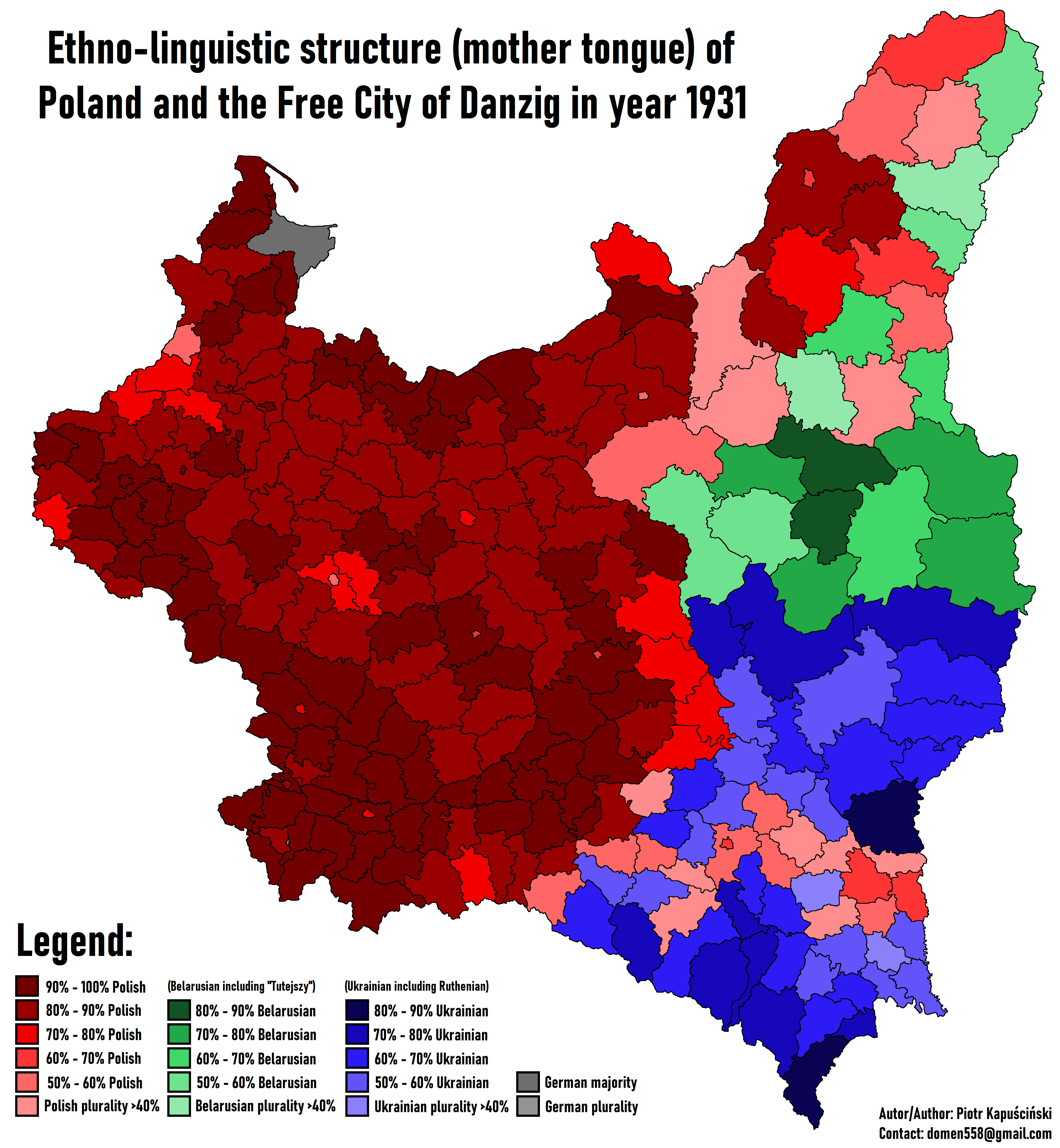
Ukrainian-speakers constituted an absolute majority of the population in all powiats of the Wołyń Voivodeship according to the 1931 Polish census.

Unlike Galicia, which had been part of Habsburg Austria from 1772 to 1918 and which was predominantly Greek Catholic, relatively urbanised and had an active Ukrainian nationalist movement, Volhynia had been part of the Russian Empire, almost 90% of the population worked the land (or owned it) and was majority Orthodox, while the remainder were mostly Jews living in towns, with Rivne, the largest at 42,000 inhabitants, having a Jewish majority. Although there were no tensions between Poles and Ukrainians in Volhynia comparable to those in Galicia, Volhynian peasants did have a long history of violently asserting claims to land in order to support themselves as farmers. It did not become an issue of clashing national identities until the early 1920s, when the new government of the Polish Republic, run by Polish agrarian politicians and National Democrats, began treating Volhynia as land to be colonised and assimilated by Poles from Central Poland, causing resistance by Ukrainian peasants. Communist agitators from neighbouring Soviet Ukraine exploited these tensions for Communist propaganda in favour of the Ukrainian peasants in Volhynia against the Polish Republic, while Ukrainian nationalists in Galicia sought to recruit the peasants for the cause of Ukrainian independence. A third faction was posed by the Polish Socialist Party, which supported Józef Piłsudski's 1926 May Coup, and his policy of "state assimilation" instead of "national assimilation": Ukrainians and other non-Polish minorities living within the Polish Republic were to be respected and included by developing a Ukrainian society that was loyal to the Polish state.

== The Experiment ==
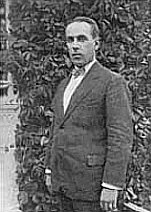
Henryk Józewski

In 1928 Henryk Józewski, the former deputy minister for internal affairs in the Ukrainian government of Symon Petliura, was named voivode, or governor, of Volhynia, to carry out the program of cultural and religious autonomy for Ukrainians in that region. Józewski, a Pole from Kiev (where, unlike in Galicia, Poles and Ukrainians had a history of cooperating with one another), was a Ukrainophile who felt that the Polish and Ukrainian nations were deeply connected and that Ukraine might one day become a "Second fatherland" for Poles.

Józewski brought Ukrainian followers of Symon Petliura, including former officers in Petliura's army, to his capital, Lutsk, to help his Volhynian administration. He hung portraits of Petliura and Piłsudski together in public places, founded an Institute for the Study of Nationality Affairs and an educational society for the Orthodox (which expanded to 870 chapters in Volhynia), subsidized a Ukrainian reading society (which by 1937 had 5,000 chapters), and sponsored Ukrainian theater. The use, in church sermons, of the Ukrainian language instead of Russian, was encouraged.

A loyalist Ukrainian political party, the Volhynian Ukrainian Alliance, was created. This party was the only Ukrainian political party allowed to freely function in Volhynia. Its program called for democracy, separation of church and state, and equality for all citizens. Though many of its supporters, former officers of Symon Petliura, had committed anti-Jewish pogroms in Volhynia during the Revolution, under Józewski's influence antisemitism was not tolerated.

Two groups competed with Józewski and his pro-Polish Ukrainian allies for the allegiance of the Volhynian Ukrainians: the Communist Party of Western Ukraine and the Organization of Ukrainian Nationalists (OUN), based in Galicia. The Communists referred to the Volhynian Experiment as a "Petliurite Occupation", and set up a front party, the Peasant Worker Alliance. The Peasant Worker Alliance, whose affiliation with the Communist party was unknown by most of its supporters, grew to be the most popular party in Volhynia, until it was banned by Józewski in 1932. Soviet-based partisans fought Józewski's police in the marshes of northern Volhynia.

While the Communists were coming to Volhynia from the East, Ukrainian nationalists entered from the South. The OUN saw Volhynia as fertile ground for the expansion of its Ukrainian nationalist ideal. By 1935 it was reported that 800 OUN members were operating in Volhynia; they had penetrated many of the Ukrainian institutions that Józewski had created. According to Józewski's rivals in the Polish military, the pro-Polish Petliurite Ukrainians in Volhynia failed to match the OUN in terms of organization and numbers.

During the period of his governance, Józewski was the object of two assassination attempts: by Soviet agents in 1932 and by Ukrainian nationalists in 1934.

== Discontinuation of the Volhynia Experiment ==
After his sponsor Pilsudski's death in 1935, Józewski lost control over his Ukrainian programme. The Polish army took over the state and, working together with the right-wing National Democrats, began undoing Józewski's reforms in favour of anti-Ukrainian and anti-Orthodox Polonisation. Józewski was criticized for allowing Ukrainians to buy land from Poles, Orthodox churches were demolished or converted to Catholic use during the "revindication" campaign, and by 1938 Józewski himself lost his post. Under his successor, all state support for Ukrainian institutions was eliminated, and it was recommended that Polish officials cease using the words "Ukraine" or "Ukrainian." The Polish army Generals believed that filling all state offices in Volhynia with ethnic Poles would ensure fast mobilization and prevent sabotage in case of a Soviet attack on Poland. Ukrainians were systematically denied the opportunity to obtain government jobs. Although the majority of the local population was Ukrainian, virtually all government official positions were assigned to Poles. Land reform designed to favour Poles from Central Poland (rather than local Volhynian Poles, most of whom could speak Ukrainian) brought further alienation of the Ukrainian population.

Military colonists were settled in Volhynia to defend the border against Soviet intervention. Despite the ethnic Ukrainian lands being overpopulated and Ukrainian farmers being in need of land, the Polish government's land reforms gave land from large Polish estates not to local villagers but to Polish colonists. This number was estimated at 300,000 in both Galicia and Volhynia by Ukrainian sources and less than 100,000 by Polish sources (see osadnik).

Plans were made for a new round of colonization of Volhynia by Polish military veterans and Polish civilians and hundreds of new Roman Catholic churches were planned for the new colonists and for converts from Orthodoxy.

== Volhynia after the Experiment ==
The ultimate result of Polish policies in Volhynia was that a sense of Ukrainian patriotism was created; however this patriotism was not tied to the Polish state. As a result of the anti-Ukrainian Polish policies that followed the Polish government's cancellation of the Volhynian Experiment, both Ukrainian nationalists and Communists found fertile ground for their ideas among the Volhynian Ukrainian population.

== Bibliography ==
- Snyder, Timothy (2003). The Reconstruction of Nations: Poland, Ukraine, Lithuania, Belarus, 1569–1999 (PDF). New Haven, CT: Yale University Press. p. 384. ISBN 978-0-300-12841-3.
- Snyder, Timothy (2005). Sketches from a Secret War: A Polish Artist's Mission to Liberate Soviet Ukraine. New Haven, CT: Yale University Press. p. 384. ISBN 978-0-300-12599-3.
