= Polish–Ukrainian War =

1918–19 conflict between the Second Polish Republic and Ukrainian forces

- Part of the Ukrainian War of Independence and the aftermath of World War I
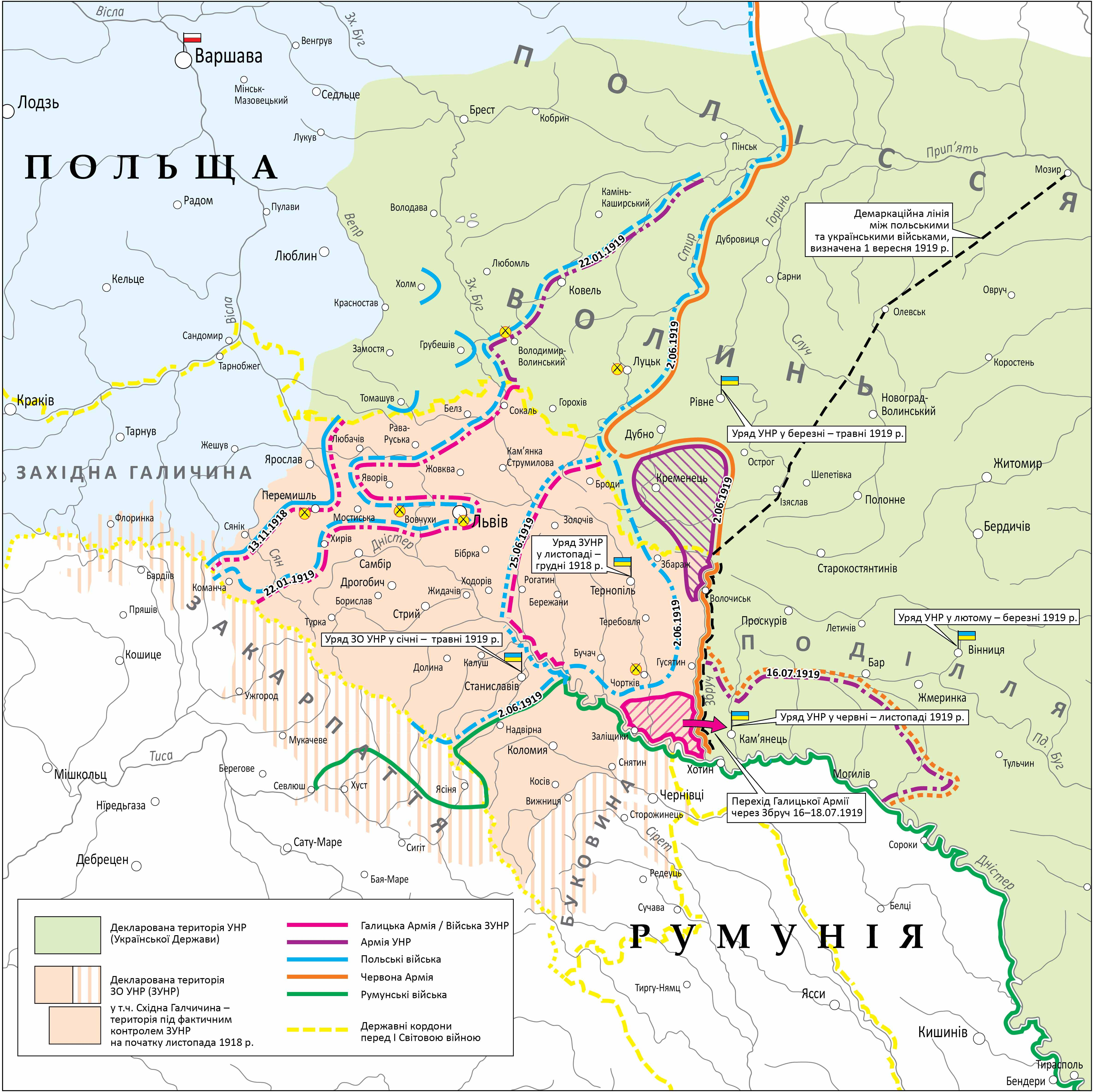
- Positions of Polish (blue) and Ukrainian (purple) forces during various stages of the war; positions of the Red Army during the simultaneous Ukrainian-Soviet War are shown in orange
Date	1 November 1918 – 18 July 1919 (8 months, 2 weeks and 3 days)
Location	West Ukrainian People's Republic
Result	Polish victory: Signing of the Treaty of Warsaw
Territorial changes	Dissolution and annexation of the West Ukrainian People's Republic by Poland

Belligerents
Second Polish Republic Regional support: Romania (in Bukovina and Pokuttia); Hungary; Czechoslovakia; (conflicts with Hutsul Republic) Strategic support: France	West Ukrainian People's Republic; Ukrainian People's Republic; (Ukrainian People's Republic) Hutsul Republic (in Maramureș); (Ukrainian People's Republic) Komancza Republic (in Lemkivshchyna until January 1919); (Ukrainian People's Republic) Bukovyna Viche (in Bukovina, 6–11 November 1919); Supported by: Czechoslovakia

Commanders and leaders
Józef Piłsudski; Jan Wroczyński; Józef Haller; Wacław Iwaszkiewicz; Zygmunt Zieliński; Edward Rydz-Śmigły; Tadeusz Rozwadowski	(Ukrainian People's Republic) Yevhen Petrushevych; Sydir Holubovych; Viktor Kurmanovych; Myron Tarnavsky; (West Ukrainian People's Republic) Oleksander Hrekov; (Ukrainian People's Republic) Mykhailo Omelianovych-Pavlenko; (Ukrainian People's Republic) Omelian Popovych; (West Ukrainian People's Republic) Boguslaw Shashkevych; (West Ukrainian People's Republic) Vasyl Oparivsky †; Symon Petliura; Oleksander Osetsky; Stepan Klochurak

Strength
Polish forces: 190,000; Romanian forces: 4,000; Hungarian forces: 620+	(Ukrainian People's Republic) West Ukrainian forces: 70,000–75,000 or over 100,000; (Ukrainian People's Republic) UPR forces: 35,000; (Ukrainian People's Republic) Hutsul forces: 1,100; (Ukrainian People's Republic) Komancza forces: 800

Casualties and losses
10,000	15,000

The Polish–Ukrainian War, from November 1918 to July 1919, was a conflict between the Second Polish Republic and Ukrainian forces (both the West Ukrainian People's Republic and the Ukrainian People's Republic).

The conflict had its roots in ethnic, cultural, and political differences between the Polish and Ukrainian populations living in the region, as Poland and both Ukrainian republics emerged from the collapse of the Russian and Austrian empires.

The war started in Eastern Galicia after the dissolution of the Austro-Hungarian Empire and spilled over into the Chełm and Volhynia regions formerly belonging to the Russian Empire.

Poland won the disputed territory on 18 July 1919.

== Background ==
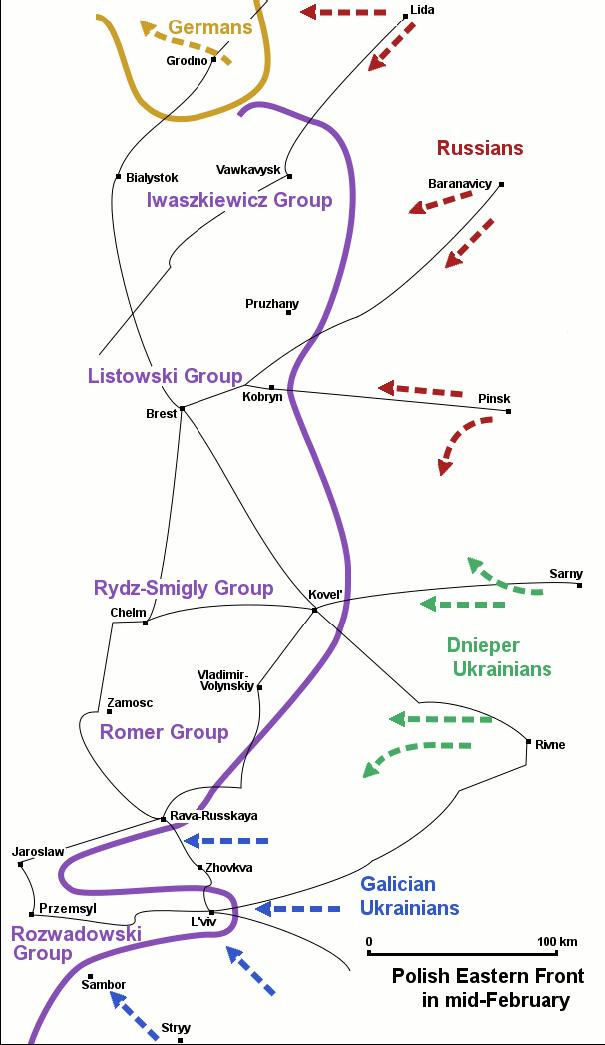
Polish–Ukrainian and Polish–Soviet Wars, early 1919

The origins of the conflict lie in the complex nationality situation in Galicia at the turn of the 20th century. As a result of the House of Habsburg's relative leniency toward national minorities, Austria-Hungary was the perfect ground for the development of both Polish and Ukrainian national movements. During the 1848 Revolution, the Austrians, concerned by Polish demands for greater autonomy within the province, gave support to Ruthenians, the name of the East Slavic people that later was recognized as Ukrainians; their goal was to be recognized as a distinct nationality.

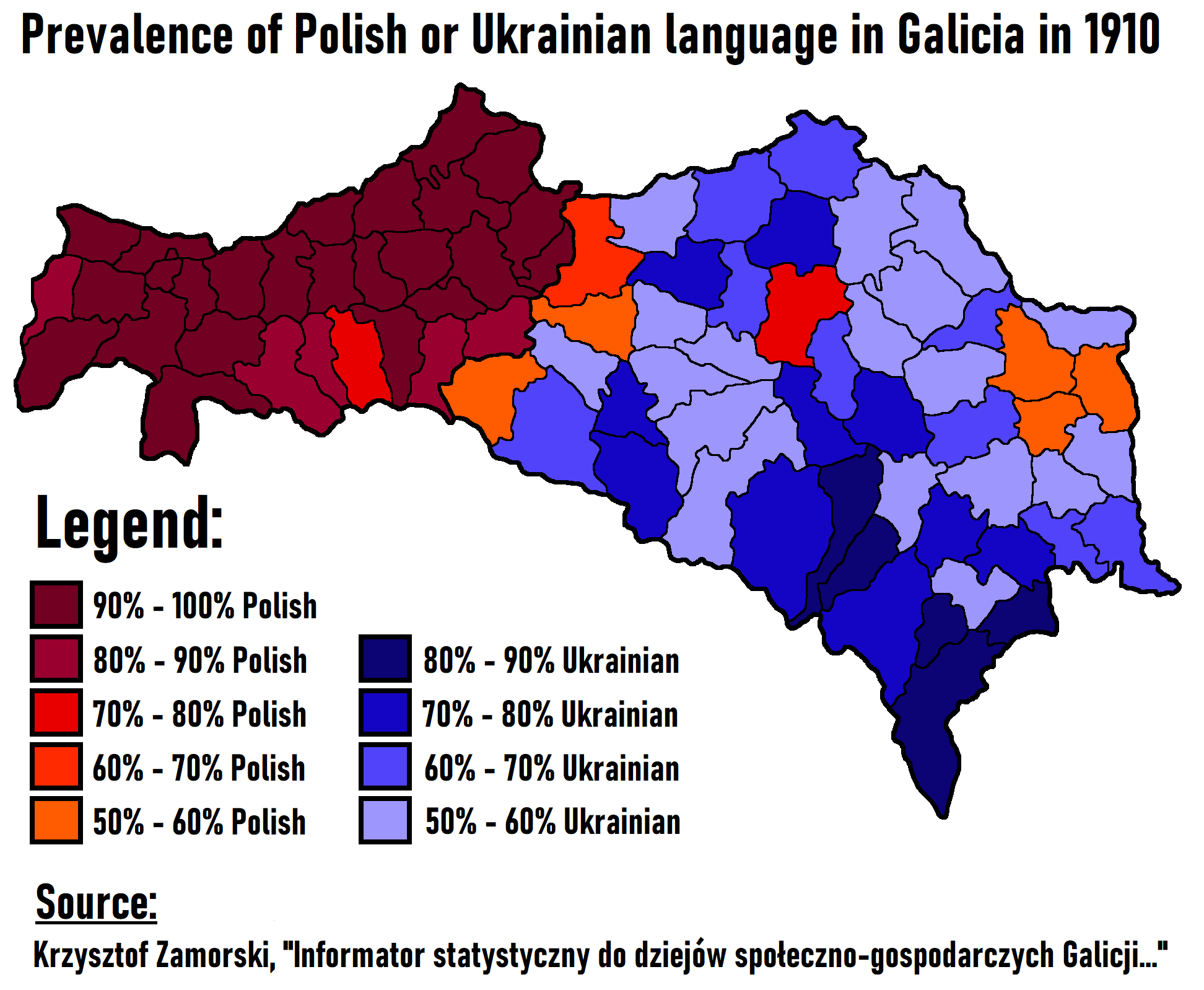
Language map of Galicia according to the 1910 census. Eastern Galicia was predominantly Ukrainian-speaking.

Schools teaching Ruthenian language were established, Ruthenian political parties formed and attempts were begun to revive their national culture. In the late 1890s and the first decades of the next century, the populist Ruthenian intelligentsia adopted the term Ukrainians to describe their nationality. They endeavored to promote a national culture, including efforts toward standardization of the Ukrainian language, and the establishment and support of Ukrainian cultural institutions such as scientific societies, theater, and a national museum in Lviv; beginning in the early 20th century, a national consciousness developed among the broader Ruthenian population, which was mainly rural.

Multiple incidents between the two nations occurred throughout the late 19th century and the early 20th century. In 1903, both Poles and Ukrainians held separate conferences in Lviv: the Poles in May and Ukrainians in August. Afterwards, the two national movements developed with contradictory goals, which was a cause of the later clash.

The ethnic composition of Galicia underlaid the conflict between the Poles and Ukrainians there. The Austrian province of Galicia consisted of Ruthenian Voivodeship territory that was part of Poland from 1434, and was seized by Austria in 1772, during the First Partition of Poland. The land included the territory of historical importance to Poland, including the ancient capital of Kraków, and had a majority Polish population, but the east Galicia included the heartland of the historic territory of Galicia-Volhynia and had a Ukrainian majority. In eastern Galicia, Ukrainians made up 65% of the population, Poles – 22% and Jews – 12%. However, the eastern Galician cities and towns were mostly populated by Poles and Jews, with Polish people forming the largest group of urban inhabitants.

In the city of Lwów (Lviv), the population in 1910 was approximately 60% Polish and 12% Ukrainian. Poles considered Lviv to be one of Poland's cultural capitals and not having a control over the city was unthinkable for them.

The religious and ethnic divisions corresponded to social stratification. Galicia's leading social class were Polish nobles or descendants of Rus' gentry who had been Polonized in the past, but in the east of the province, Ruthenians (Ukrainians) were the majority of the peasants. Poles and Jews were responsible for most of the commercial and industrial development in Galicia in the late 19th century.

Throughout the 19th and the early 20th centuries, the local Ukrainians attempted to persuade the Austrians to divide Galicia into Western (Polish) and Eastern (Ukrainian) provinces. The Austrians eventually agreed in principle to divide the province of Galicia. In October 1916, Emperor Karl I promised to do so once the war had ended.

== Prelude ==
Due to the intervention of Archduke Wilhelm of Austria, who adopted a Ukrainian identity and considered himself a Ukrainian patriot, in October 1918 two regiments of mostly Ukrainian troops were garrisoned in Lemberg (modern Lviv). As the Austro-Hungarian government collapsed, on October 18, 1918, the Ukrainian National Council (Rada), consisting of Ukrainian members of the Austrian parliament and regional Galician and Bukovynan diets as well as leaders of Ukrainian political parties, was formed. The council announced the intention to unite the West Ukrainian lands into a single state. As the Poles were taking their own steps to take over Lviv and Eastern Galicia, Captain Dmytro Vitovsky of the Sich Riflemen led the group of young Ukrainian officers in a decisive action and during the night of October 31 – November 1, the Ukrainian military units, consisting of 1,400 soldiers and 60 officers, took control over Lviv. The West Ukrainian People's Republic was proclaimed on November 13, 1918, with Lviv as its capital.

The timing of proclamation of the Republic caught the Polish ethnic population and administration by surprise. The new Ukrainian Republic claimed sovereignty over Eastern Galicia, including the Carpathians up to the city of Nowy Sącz in the West, as well as Volhynia, Carpathian Ruthenia and Bukovina (the last two territories were also claimed by Hungary and Romania respectively). In Lviv, the Ukrainian residents enthusiastically supported the proclamation. The city's significant Jewish minority accepted or remained neutral towards the Ukrainian proclamation, while the city's Polish majority was shocked to find themselves in a proclaimed Ukrainian state. Since the West Ukrainian People's Republic was not internationally recognized and Poland's boundaries had not yet been defined, the issue of ownership of the disputed territory was reduced to a question of military control.

== War ==
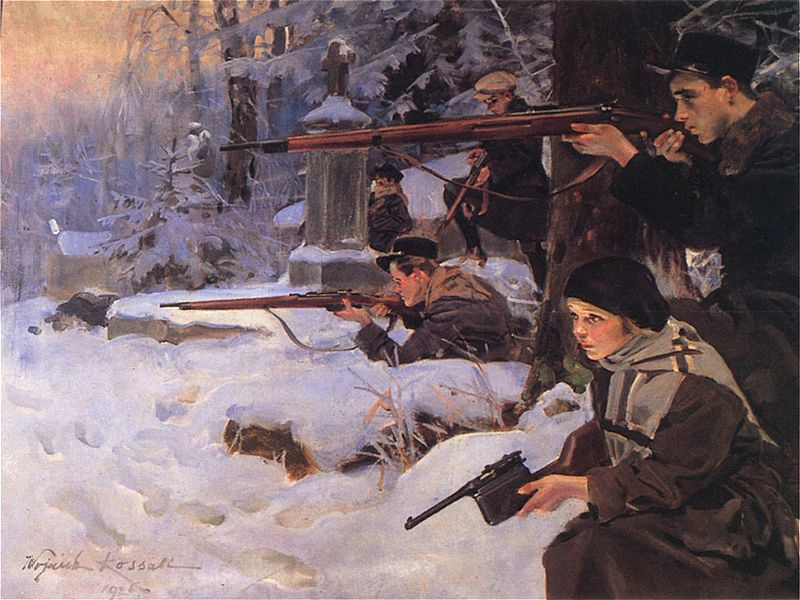
"Lwów Eaglets – the defence of the cemetery" by Wojciech Kossak (1926). Oil on canvas, Polish Army Museum, Warsaw. A painting depicting Polish youths in the Battle of Lemberg (1918) (in Polish historiography called the Defense of Lwów) against the West Ukrainian People's Republic proclaimed in Lviv.

=== Initial stages ===
Fighting between Ukrainian and Polish forces was concentrated around the declared Ukrainian capital of Lviv and the approaches to that city. In Lviv, the Ukrainian forces were opposed by local self-defence units formed mostly of World War I veterans, students and children. However, skillful command, good tactics and high morale allowed Poles to resist the poorly planned Ukrainian attacks. In addition, the Poles were able to skillfully buy time and wait for reinforcements through the arrangement of cease-fires with the Ukrainians. While Poles could count on widespread support from the civilian population, the Ukrainian side was largely dependent on help from outside the city. Other uprisings against Ukrainian rule erupted in Drohobych, Przemyśl, Sambir and Jarosław. In Przemyśl, local Ukrainian soldiers quickly dispersed to their homes and Poles seized the bridges over the River San and the railroad to Lviv, enabling the Polish forces in that city to obtain significant reinforcements.

After two weeks of heavy fighting within Lviv, an armed unit under the command of Lt. Colonel Michał Karaszewicz-Tokarzewski of the renascent Polish Army broke through the Ukrainian siege on November 21 and arrived in the city. The Ukrainians were repelled, the entire Ukrainian Sich Riflemen regiment sent to support the Ukrainians being annihilated. Immediately after capturing the city, some in the local Jewish militia attacked Polish troops, while at the same time elements of the Polish forces as well as common criminals looted the Jewish and Ukrainian quarters of the city, killing up to 340 civilians. The Poles also interned a number of Ukrainian activists in detention camps. The Ukrainian government provided financial assistance to the Jewish victims of the violence and were able to recruit a Jewish battalion into their army. Some factions blame these atrocities on the Blue Army of General Haller. This is unlikely as this French-trained and supported fighting force did not leave France and the Western Front until April 1919, well after the rioting.

On November 9 Polish forces attempted to seize the Drohobych oil fields by surprise, but, outnumbered by the Ukrainians, they were driven back. The Ukrainians retained control over the oil fields until May 1919.

On 6 November, a new Ukrainian polity was proclaimed in the Northern half of the region of Bukovina: Ukrainian Bukovina under President Omelyan Popovych. The new state had its capital at Chernivtsi. It was dissolved on 11 November, when the Romanian Army occupied Chernivtsi. The Ukrainian administration and its military support retreated from the city the day before.

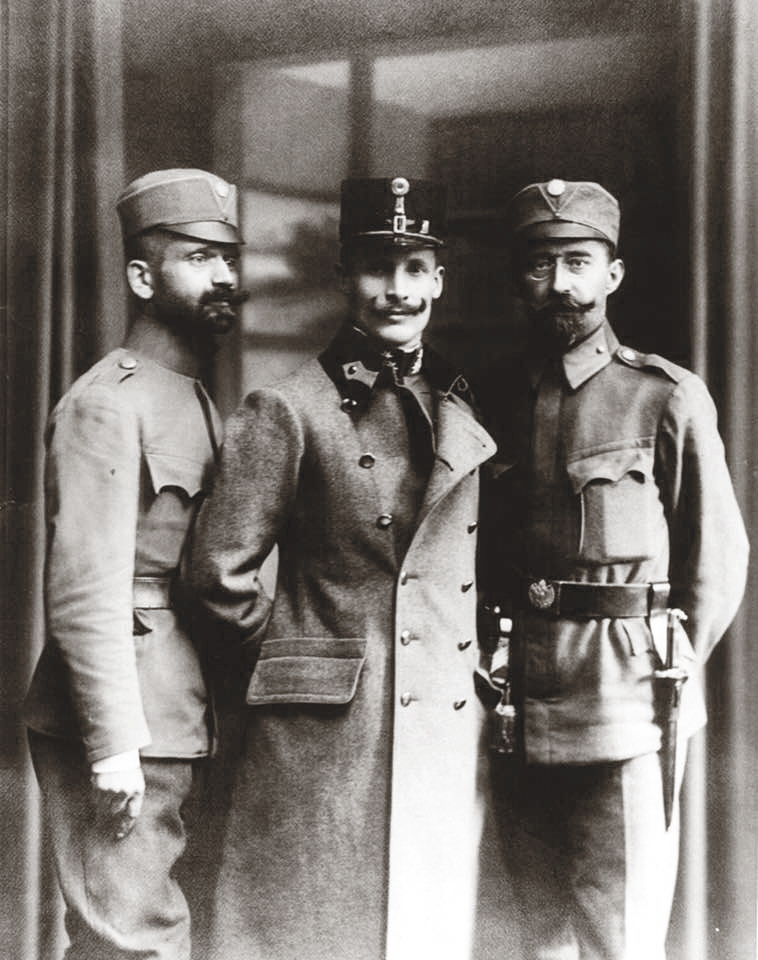
Dmytro Vitovsky, first commander of the Ukrainian Galician Army, flanked by two officers, 1918.

By the end of November 1918, Polish forces controlled Lviv and the railroad linking Lviv to central Poland through Przemyśl, while Ukrainians controlled the rest of Eastern Galicia east of the river San, including the areas south and north of the railroad into Lviv. Thus, the Polish-controlled city of Lviv (Lwów) faced Ukrainian forces on three sides.

=== Battles over Volhynia ===
Immediately after the collapse of Austria-Hungary, Polish forces had captured the Kholm (Polish: Chełm) area; shortly thereafter the Austrian commandants in southwestern Volhynia (Volodymyr-Volynskyi and Kovel) handed over the government to the local Polish national committees. In November–December 1918, the Poles also advanced into Podlachia and Western Polesia, but were stopped in western Volhynia by the troops of general Osetsky.

As Polish units tried to seize control of the region, the forces of the Ukrainian People's Republic under Symon Petlura tried to recover the territory of Kholm Governorate already controlled by the Polish troops.

According to Richard Pipes, the first major pogrom in this region took place in January 1919 in the town of Ovruch, where Jews were robbed and killed by regiments of Kozyr-Zyrka affiliated with Symon Petlura's government. Nicolas Werth claims that armed units of the Ukrainian People's Republic were also responsible for rapes, looting, and massacres in Zhytomir, in which 500–700 Jews lost their lives.

After two months of heavy fighting the conflict was resolved in March 1919 by fresh and well-equipped Polish units under General Edward Rydz-Śmigły.

=== Stalemate in Eastern Galicia ===
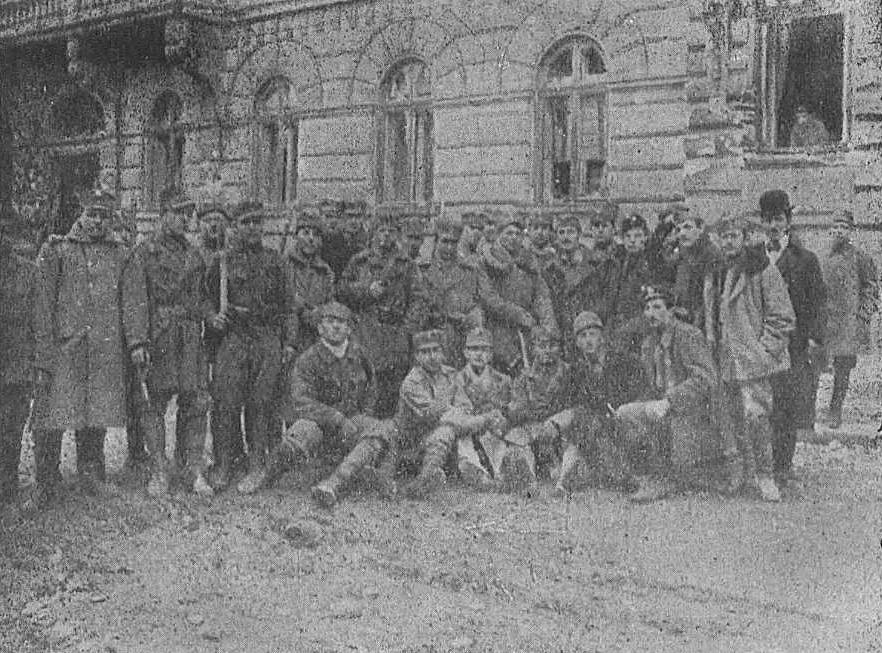
Polish and Ukrainian soldiers in Lviv (Lwów) during a ceasefire, 1918

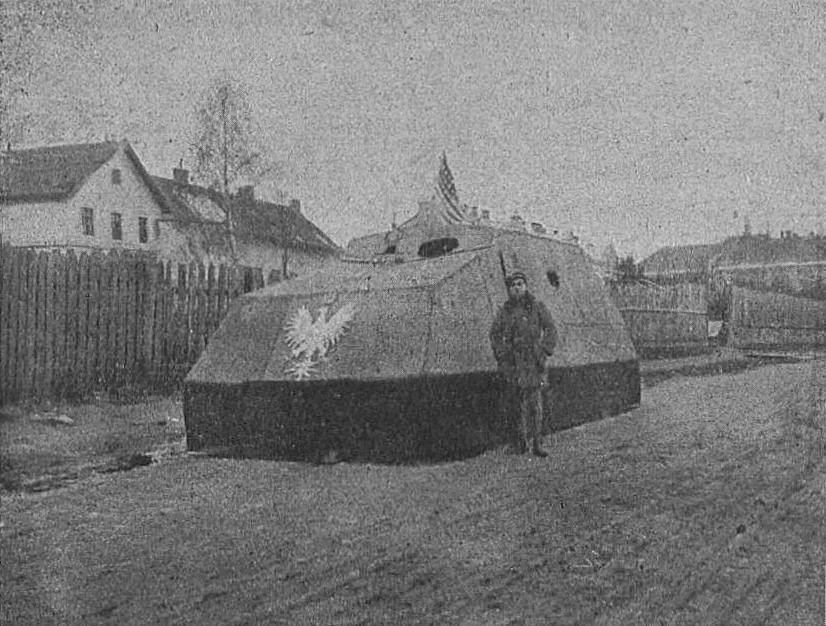
Photograph of an improvised armored vehicle, constructed by the Polish defenders of Lwów, decked with the White Eagle and an American Flag, 1918

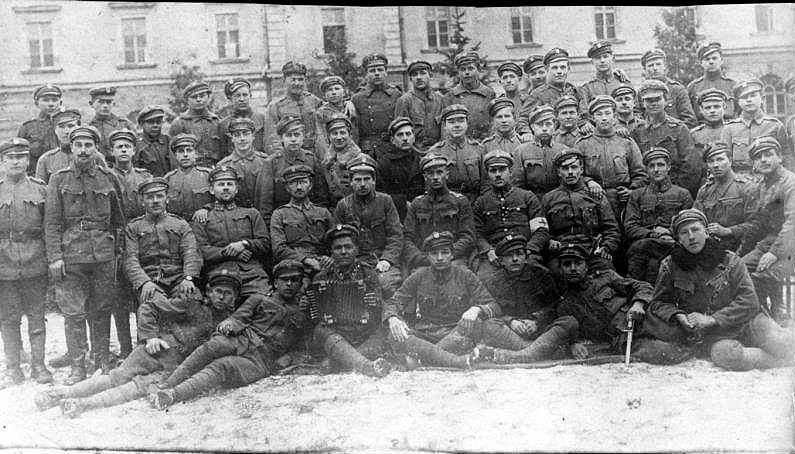
Polish–Ukrainian War 1918–1919. Polish defenders of Chyrów (modern Khyriv) with the Jesuit college in the background, 1919.

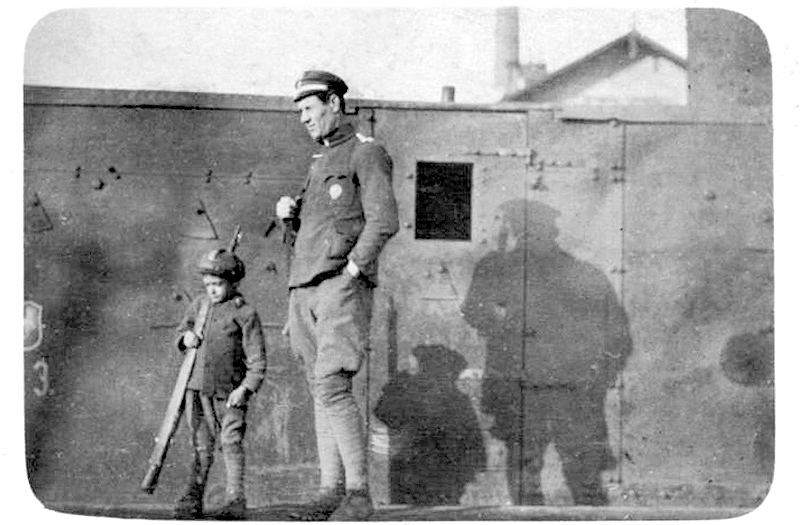
Polish armoured train Sanok-Gromobój and a Polish soldier Wiktor Borczyk with his son, 1918.

Thanks to fast and effective mobilization in December 1918, the Ukrainians possessed a large numerical advantage until February 1919 and pushed the Poles into defensive positions. According to an American report from the period of January 13 – February 1, 1919, Ukrainians eventually managed to surround Lviv on three sides. The city's inhabitants were deprived of water supply and electricity. Ukrainian army also held villages on both sidelines of the railway leading to Przemyśl.

Ukrainian forces continued to control most of eastern Galicia and were a threat to Lviv itself until May 1919. During this time, according to Italian and Polish reports, Ukrainian forces enjoyed high morale (an Italian observer behind Galician lines stated that the Ukrainians were fighting with the "courage of the doomed") while many of the Polish soldiers, particularly from what had been Congress Poland, wanted to return home because they saw no reason to fight for an alien land; the Polish forces were outnumbered by two to one and lacked ammunition. Despite being initially outnumbered, the Poles had certain advantages. Their forces had many more and better-trained officers resulting in a better discipline and more mobile force; the Poles also enjoyed excellent intelligence and, due to their control of railroads behind their lines, were able to move their soldiers quite quickly. As a result, although the Poles had fewer total troops than did the Ukrainians, in particularly important battles they were able to bring in as many soldiers as did the Ukrainians.

On December 9, 1918, Ukrainian forces broke through the outer defences of Przemyśl in the hope of capturing the city and thus cutting off Polish-controlled Lviv from central Poland. However, the Poles were able to quickly send relief troops and by December 17 the Ukrainians were forced back. On December 27, bolstered by peasant troops sent to Galicia from Eastern Ukraine in the hopes that the Western Ukrainians would be able to form a disciplined force out of them, a general Ukrainian offensive against Lviv began. Lviv's defences held, and the eastern Ukrainian troops mutinied.

From January 6-January 11, 1919 a Polish attack by 5,000 newly recruited forces from formerly Russian Poland commanded by Jan Romer was repulsed by Western Ukrainian forces near Rava-Ruska, north of Lviv. Only a small number of troops together with Romer were able to break through to Lviv after suffering heavy losses. Between January 11 and January 13, Polish forces attempted to dislodge Ukrainian troops besieging Lviv from the south while at the same time Ukrainian troops attempted another general assault on Lviv. Both efforts failed. In February 1919, Polish troops attempting to capture Sambir were defeated by the Ukrainian defenders with heavy losses, although the poor mobility of the Ukrainian troops prevented them from taking advantage of this victory.

On February 14, Ukrainian forces began another assault on Lviv. By February 20, they were able to successfully cut off the rail links between Lviv and Przemysl, leaving Lviv surrounded and the Ukrainian forces in a good position to take the city. However, a French-led mission from the Entente arrived at the Ukrainian headquarters on February 22 and demanded that the Ukrainian cease hostilities under threat of breaking all diplomatic ties between the Entente and the Ukrainian government. On February 25 the Ukrainian military suspended its offensive. The Barthélemy mission proposed a demarcation line (February 28) leaving almost 70% of the East Galician territory to Ukrainians, and Lviv with oil fields to Poland. The Ukrainians would be supplied with half of the oil production. The proposal was accepted by the Poles. The Allied demands, which included the loss of significant amount of Ukrainian-held and inhabited territory, were however deemed to excessively favor the Poles by the Ukrainians, who resumed their offensive on March 4. On March 5 Ukrainian artillery blew up the Polish forces' ammunition dump in Lviv; the resultant explosion caused a panic among Polish forces. The Ukrainians, however, failed to take advantage of this. During the time of the cease-fire, the Poles had been able to organize a relief force of 8,000–10,000 troops which by March 12 reached Przemyśl and by March 18 had driven the Ukrainian forces from the Lviv-Przemyśl railroad, permanently securing Lviv.

On January 6–11 of 1919 a small part of the Ukrainian Galician Army invaded Transcarpathia to spread pro-Ukrainian sentiments among residents (the region was occupied by Hungarians and Czechoslovaks). Ukrainian troops fought with Czechoslovak and Hungarian local police. They succeeded in capturing some Hungarian-controlled Ukrainian settlements. After some clashes with Czechoslovaks, the Ukrainians retreated because Czechoslovakia (instead of Ukrainian People's Republic) was the only country that traded with the Western Ukrainian People's Republic and that supported it politically. Further conflict with the Czechoslovak authorities would have led to the complete economical and political isolation of the Western Ukrainian People's Republic.

=== Ukrainian collapse ===
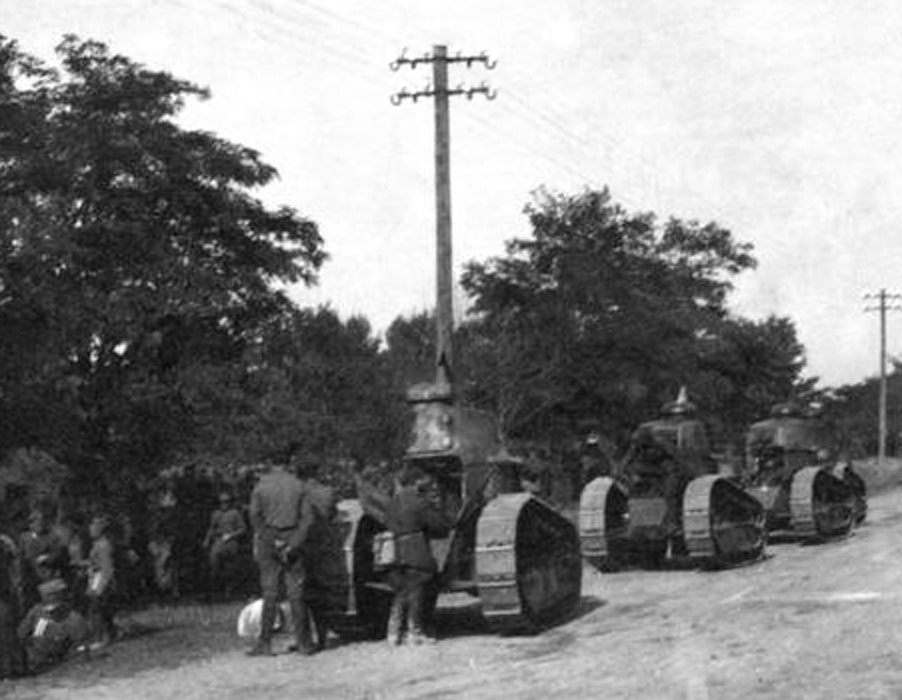
The Blue Army included the 1st Tank Regiment of 120 Renault FT tanks. With its arrival in Lwów, the Ukrainians had to face the fourth largest tank unit in the world.

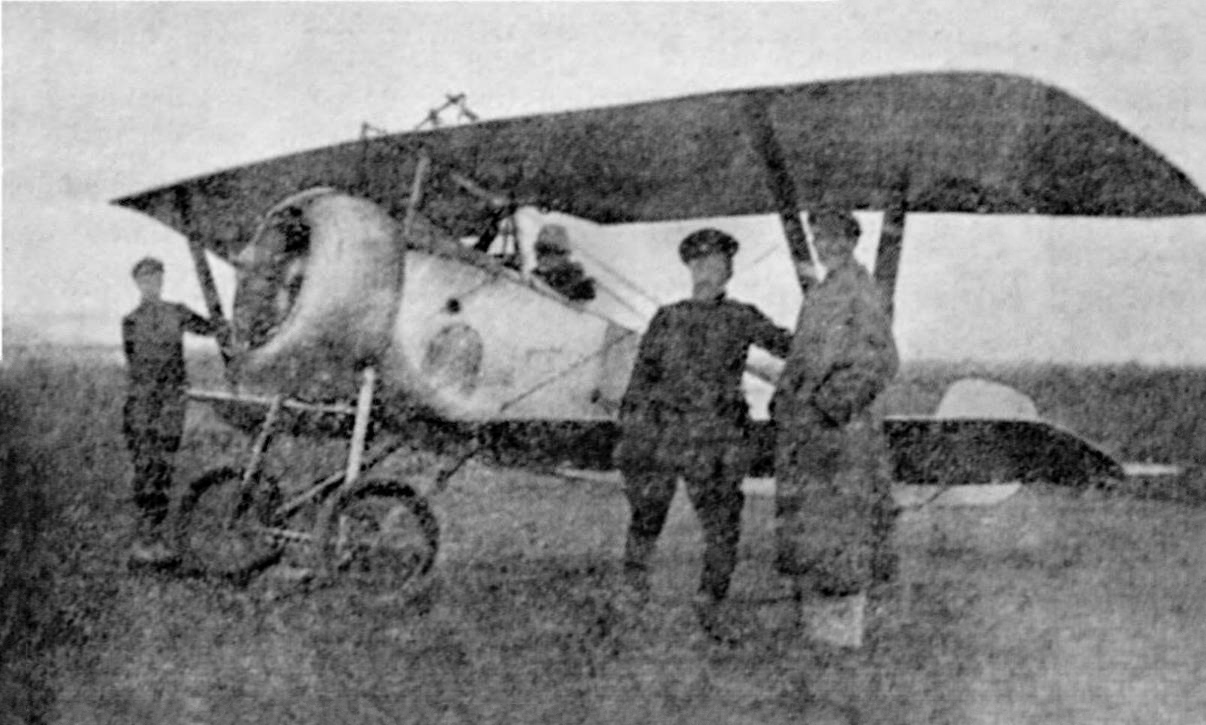
Nieuport 17 of the Ukrainian Galician Army

On May 14, 1919, a Polish general offensive began throughout Volhynia and Eastern Galicia. It was carried out by units of the Polish Army, aided by the newly arrived Blue Army of General Józef Haller de Hallenburg. This army, composed of Polish forces which had fought for the Entente on the Western front, numbering 60,000 troops, was well equipped by the Western Allies and partially staffed with experienced French officers specifically to fight the Bolsheviks and not the forces of the Western Ukrainian People's Republic. Despite this, the Poles dispatched Haller's army against the Ukrainians in order to break the stalemate in eastern Galicia. The Allies sent several telegrams ordering the Poles to halt their offensive, as using the French-equipped army against the Ukrainians specifically contradicted the conditions of the French assistance, but these were ignored, with the Polish side arguing that the Ukrainians were Bolshevik sympathizers. At the same time, on May 23, Romania opened a second front against Ukrainian forces, demanding their withdrawal from the southern sections of eastern Galicia, including the temporary capital of Stanislaviv. This resulted in a loss of territory, ammunition and further isolation from the outside world.

The Ukrainian lines were broken, mostly due to the withdrawal of the elite Sich Riflemen. On May 27 the Polish forces reached the Złota Lipa–Berezhany-Jezierna-Radziwiłłów line. The Polish advance was accompanied by a large wave of anti-Jewish violence and looting by disorganized Polish mobs, as in Lviv in 1918, and by Polish military units operating against the orders of their officers, in particular, those of the Poznań regiments and Haller's army. Following the demands of the Entente, the Polish offensive was halted and Haller's troops assumed defensive positions.

=== Chortkiv Offensive and ultimate Polish victory ===
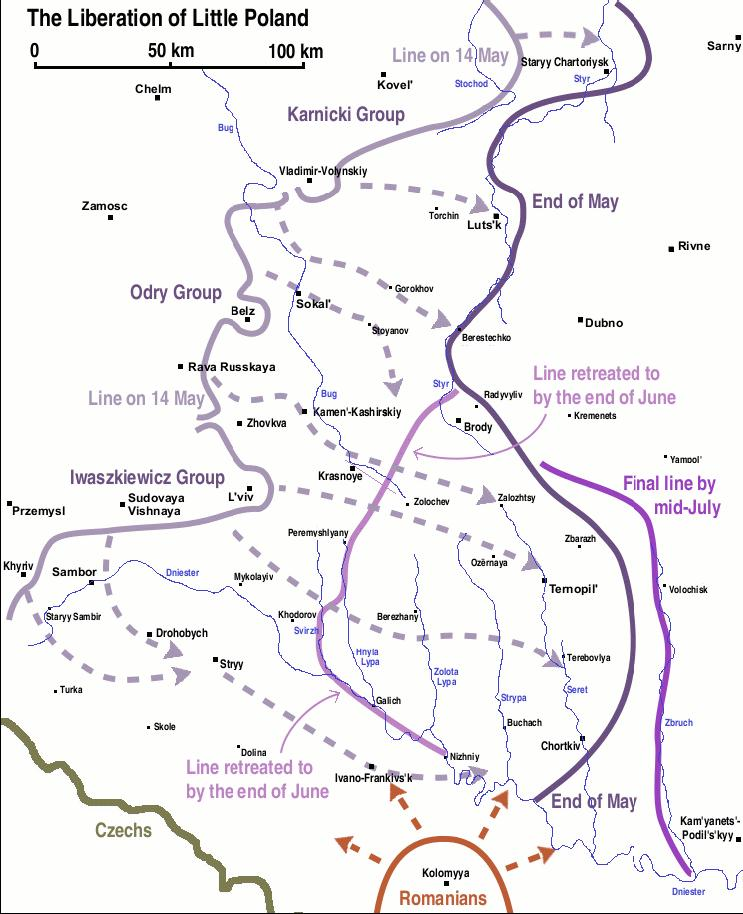
Final stage of the Polish–Ukrainian War.

On June 8, 1919, the Ukrainian forces under the new command of Oleksander Hrekov, a former general in the Russian army, started a counter-offensive, and after three weeks advanced to Hnyla Lypa and the upper Stryi river, defeating five Polish divisions. Although the Polish forces had been forced to withdraw, they were able to prevent their forces from collapsing and avoided being encircled and captured. Thus, in spite of their victories, the Ukrainian forces were unable to obtain significant amounts of arms and ammunition. By June 27 the Ukrainian forces had advanced 120 km. along the Dnister river and on another they had advanced 150 km, past the town of Brody. They came to within two days' march of Lviv.

The successful Chortkiv offensive halted primarily because of a lack of arms – there were only 5–10 bullets for each Ukrainian soldier. The West Ukrainian government controlled the Drohobych oil fields with which it planned to purchase arms for the struggle, but for political and diplomatic reasons weapons and ammunition could only be sent to Ukraine through Czechoslovakia. Although the Ukrainian forces managed to push the Poles back approximately 120–150 km. they failed to secure a route to Czechoslovakia. This meant that they were unable to replenish their supply of arms and ammunition, and the resulting lack of supplies forced Hrekov to end his campaign.

Józef Piłsudski assumed the command of the Polish forces on June 27 and started yet another offensive, helped by two fresh Polish divisions. On June 28, the Polish offensive began. Short of ammunition and facing an enemy now twice its size, the Ukrainian Galician Army and ZUNR leadership were pushed back to the line of the Zbruch river on 16–18 July, after which ZUNR was occupied by Poland. Although the Ukrainian infantry had run out of ammunition, its artillery had not. This provided the Ukrainian forces with cover for an orderly retreat. Approximately 100,000 civilian refugees and 60,000 troops, 20,000 of whom were combat ready, were able to escape across the Zbruch River into Central Ukraine.

== Diplomatic front ==
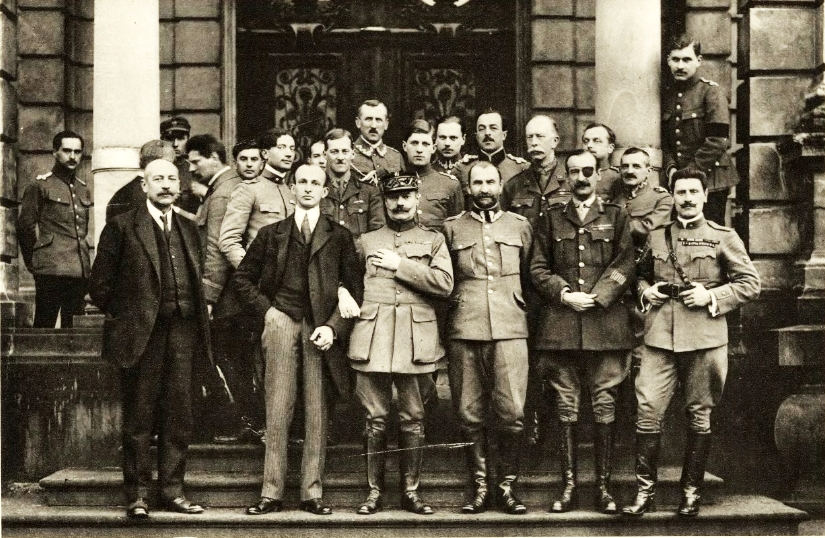
Allied diplomatic mission to Poland in Lwów, February 1919. First row from the left: Stanisław Wańkowicz, Robert Howard Lord, Gen. Joseph Barthélemy, Gen. Tadeusz Rozwadowski, Gen. Adrian Carton de Wiart and Maj. Giuseppe Stabile.

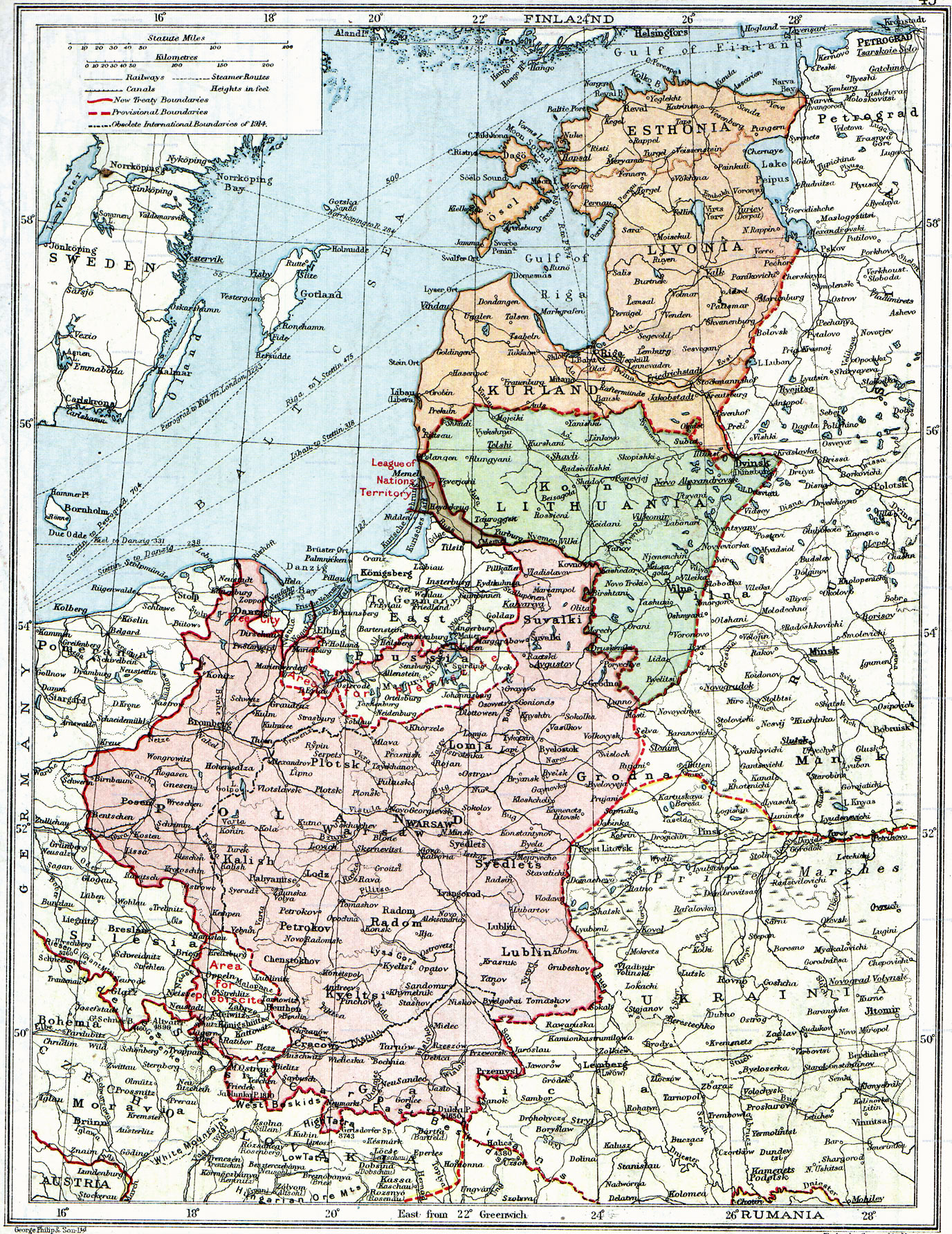
"Poland & The New Baltic States": a map from a 1920 British atlas, showing borders left undefined between the treaties of Brest-Litovsk, Versailles and Riga

The Polish and Ukrainian forces struggled on the diplomatic as well as military fronts both during and after the war. The Ukrainians hoped that the western allies of World War I would support their cause because the Treaty of Versailles that ended the first world war was based on the principle of national self-determination. Accordingly, the diplomats of the West Ukrainian People's Republic hoped that the West would compel Poland to withdraw from territories with a Ukrainian demographic majority.

Opinion among the allies was divided. Britain, under the leadership of prime minister David Lloyd George, and to a lesser extent Italy were opposed to Polish expansion. Their representatives maintained that granting the territory of the Western Ukrainian People's Republic to Poland would violate the principle of national self-determination and that hostile national minorities would undermine the Polish state. In reality, the British policy was dictated by unwillingness to harm Russian interests in the region and alienate the future Russian state through preventing possible union of Eastern Galicia with Russia. In addition, Britain was interested in Western Ukraine's oil fields. Czechoslovakia, itself involved in a conflict with Poland, was friendly towards the Ukrainian government and sold it weapons in exchange for oil. France, on the other hand, strongly supported Poland in the conflict. The French hoped that a large, powerful Polish state would serve as a counterbalance to Germany and would isolate Germany from Soviet Russia. French diplomats consistently supported Polish claims to territories also claimed by Germany, Lithuania and Ukraine. France also provided large numbers of arms and ammunition, and French officers, most notably General Haller's forces, to Polish forces that were used against the western Ukrainian military.

During the winter of 1918–1919, a diplomatic offensive by the Polish government tried to tilt the opinions of the Allies in favor of fully backing the Polish cause and to counter German disinformation campaign, which aimed to weaken French, British and American support of the new Polish state. Government officials in Poland and abroad repeatedly raised the issue of a possible link between Germany and the West Ukrainian People's Republic, insisting that the Germans were financially supporting the West Ukrainian government and the Bolshevik revolution in Russia in order to sow a wave of political unrest and chaos in the region. However, the Ukrainians objected to such claims, arguing that the Poles only sought to portray the West Ukrainian People's Republic as pro-German and sympathetic to the Bolsheviks because of a successful defense put up by the Ukrainian Galician Army, which stalled the Polish military offensive.

In attempt to end the war, in January 1919 an Allied commission led by a French general was sent to negotiate a peace treaty between the two sides, prompting a ceasefire. In February it recommended that the West Ukrainian People's Republic surrender a third of its territory, including the city of Lviv and the Drohobych oil fields. The Ukrainians refused as the truce did not correspond to ethnology of the country or the military situation, and broke diplomatic ties with Poland. In mid-March 1919, the French marshal Ferdinand Foch, who wanted to use Poland as an operational base for an offensive against the Red Army, brought the issue of Polish–Ukrainian war before the Supreme Council and appealed for large-scale Polish-Romanian military operation which would be conducted with Allied support, as well as sending Haller's divisions to Poland immediately to relieve Lviv from Ukrainian siege.

Another Allied commission, led by South African General Louis Botha, proposed an armistice in May that would involve the (West) Ukrainians keeping the Drohobych oil fields and the Poles keeping Lwów. The Ukrainian side agreed to this proposal but it was rejected by the Poles on the grounds that it didn't take into consideration the overall military situation of Poland and the circumstances on the eastern front. The Bolshevik army broke through the UPR forces and was advancing to Podolia and Volhynia. The Poles argued that they need military control over the whole of Eastern Galicia to secure the Russian front in its southern part and strengthen it by a junction with Romania. The Poles launched an attack soon afterward using a large force equipped by France (Haller's Army), which captured most of the territory of the West Ukrainian People's Republic. Urgent telegrams by the Western allies to halt this offensive were ignored. Czechoslovakia, which had inherited seven oil refineries from prewar Austrian times and which was dependent on its contracts for oil with the Ukrainian government, demanded that the Poles send the Czechoslovaks the oil that had been paid for to the Ukrainian government. The Poles refused, stating that the oil was paid for with ammunition that had been used against Polish soldiers. Although the Czechoslovaks did not retaliate, according to Polish reports the Czechoslovaks considered seizing the oil fields from the Poles and returning them to the Ukrainians who would honor their contracts.

On June 25, 1919, the Allied Council legitimized Polish control over Eastern Galicia through the resolution that approved military occupation by Polish forces, including Haller's Army, up to the river Zbruch and authorized the Polish government to establish an interim civil administration, which would preserve as far as possible the territorial autonomy and liberties of the inhabitants. On November 21, 1919, the Highest Council of the Paris Peace Conference granted Eastern Galicia to Poland for a period of 25 years, after which a plebiscite was to be held there, and obliged the Polish government to give territorial autonomy to the region. This decision was suspended on 22 December 1919 and never implemented. On April 21, 1920, Józef Piłsudski and Symon Petliura signed an alliance, in which Poland promised the Ukrainian People's Republic the military help in the Kyiv offensive against the Red Army in exchange for the acceptance of Polish–Ukrainian border on the river Zbruch.

Following this agreement, the government of the West Ukrainian People's Republic went into exile in Vienna, where it enjoyed the support of various West Ukrainian political emigrees as well as soldiers of the Galician army interned in Bohemia. Although not officially recognized by any state as the government of West Ukraine, it engaged in diplomatic activity with the French and British governments in the hopes of obtaining a favourable settlement at Versailles. As a result of its efforts, the council of the League of Nations declared on February 23, 1921, that Galicia lay outside the territory of Poland and that Poland did not have the mandate to establish administrative control in that country and that Poland was merely the occupying military power of Galicia, the sovereign of which were the Allied Powers (pursuant to the Treaty of Saint-Germain signed with Austria in September 1919) and whose fate would be determined by the Council of Ambassadors at the League of Nations. The Council of Ambassadors in Paris stated on July 8, 1921, that so-called "West Ukrainian Government" of Yevhen Petrushevych did not constitute a government either de facto or de jure and did not have the right to represent any of the territories formerly belonging to the Austrian empire. After a long series of negotiations, on March 14, 1923, the Council of Ambassadors decided that Galicia would be incorporated into Poland "taking into consideration that Poland has recognized that in regard to the eastern part of Galicia ethnographic conditions fully deserve its autonomous status." After 1923, Galicia was internationally recognized as part of the Polish state. The government of the West Ukrainian People's Republic then disbanded, while Poland reneged on its promise of autonomy for Eastern Galicia.

=== Barthelemy Line ===
Map of Eastern Galicia with the partition proposals from January and February 1919 No Ukrainian claims Disputed Area No Polish claims

In an attempt to stop the war, a French general Marie Joseph Barthélemy proposed a demarcation line, known as the Barthelemy Line, that was supposed to cease the fighting between the Polish and West Ukrainian army.

In 1918, the Entente countries sought to form a common anti-Bolshevik front, which was to include the Polish, White Russian, Romanian and Ukrainian armies. The outbreak of Polish-Ukrainian hostilities in Lviv on 1 November thwarted these plans, so the Entente states began to press both the Poles and Galicians to seek a settlement and adopt the demarcation line proposed by the allied states.

On 19 January 1919, by the order of General Franchet d'Esperey, a peacekeeping mission under the command of General Joseph Barthelemy arrived in Kraków. Initially, the mission familiarised itself with the Polish position, which opted for the Bug-Świca line. It then travelled to Lwów, meeting with the Ukrainian delegation. The Ukrainians opted for the San line as a future demarcation line.

In this situation, General Barthelemy presented his compromise proposal on 28 January 1919. The armistice line was to run along the Bug River to Kamionka Strumiłłowa, then along the border of the districts to Bóbrka, then along the Bóbrka-Wybranka railway line, westwards to Mikołajów (leaving Mikolajiv on the Ukrainian side), then along the railway line Lwów-Stryi to the border of the disputed territory in the Eastern Carpathians. The Stryi-Lavochne railway line was to remain in Ukrainian hands. This was to be a temporary line, until the matter was settled by the Paris Peace Conference.

The Polish side accepted this solution, but the Ukrainian delegation insisted on the 'San line'. As a result of the Ukrainian disapproval, the Entente delegation made another attempt at mediation. This was carried out by the Inter-allied Commission for Poland subcommittee set up on 15 February 1919 and headed by Joseph Noulens. The sub-commission consisted of General Joseph Barthelemy (France) as chairman, Colonel Adrian Carton de Wiart (UK), Dr Robert Howard Lord (United States) and Major Giovanni Stabile (Italy). The subcommittee presented a draft truce convention on 15 February 1919. The truce, along the Barthelemy Line, was to be purely military and not affect the decisions of the Paris Peace Conference in any way. An integral part of the convention was to be a supplementary treaty concerning the Boryslav-Drohobychian Oil Basin. It was to remain on the Polish side of the truce line under the management of an international commission, with 50% of oil production to be transferred to the Ukrainian side. Poland and WUNR were only to be able to record the volume of production and pay for oil supplies. The project secured Entente interests in the oil basin and was the first step towards its neutralisation. At the time of the proposal, the territory of the basin was under the control of the Ukrainian Galician Army. For the West Ukrainian government, the terms of the Armistice Convention were unfavourable; however, they offered a chance to compromise with Poland and obtain international recognition of the Ukrainian state by the Entente.

The commission succeeded in getting the armistice treaty signed on 24 February 1919, and presented its proposals to the parties on 28 February, which was rejected by the West Ukrainian side. As a result of the failure to agree on the demarcation line, Polish-Ukrainian hostilities resumed on 2 March.

== Civilian casualties ==
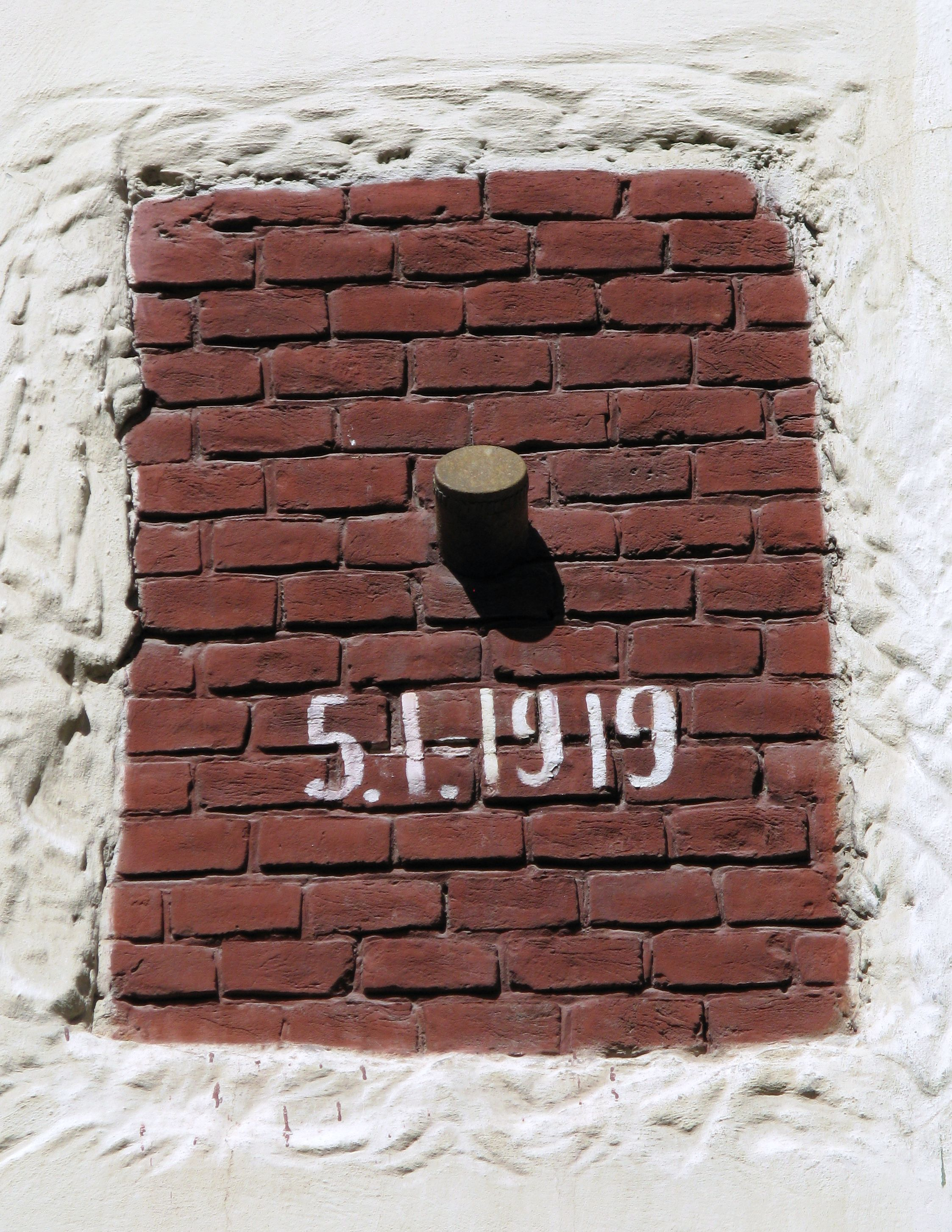
Shell from Polish–Ukrainian war 1918–1919 in Lviv, dated 5 January 1919.

Historian Christoph Mick states there was no systematic violence nor massacres of ethnic Poles by Ukrainians during the course of this war but that both sides blamed each other for bloodshed. When Ukrainian forces first captured Lwów they refused to take hostages, tolerated Polish recruitment centers and were even prepared to enter negotiations with the Polish side, but were met with armed resistance. Polish historians, however, describe numerous examples during which Ukrainian troops used terror to subdue Poles into compliance. Ukrainian authorities tried to intimidate the Polish population in Lwów by sending soldiers and armed trucks into the streets and dispersed crowds that could have developed into pro-Polish demonstrations. Ukrainian soldiers patrolled the streets with firearms and machine guns aimed at pedestrians; Polish sources claim that the Ukrainians shot bystanders who were looking at them from windows or building entrances, while Ukrainians claimed Poles were shooting at their soldiers from windows and behind gateways. Polish fighters also often dressed in civilian clothing when shooting at Ukrainian soldiers. According to historian Christoph Mick, both Poles and Ukrainians engaged in a propaganda war with each side accusing the other of war crimes and brutality. During fights over Lviv, Polish nurses who assisted wounded soldiers were said to have been captured by Ukrainian forces and tortured before being executed, while Ukrainians sources claimed that Polish soldiers shot Ukrainian medical patrols and accused Poles of rape and bloodlust.

When Poles captured Lwów, a mixed group of Polish criminals released from prisons, militiamen and some regular soldiers pillaged the Jewish and Ukrainian parts of the city, abusing local civilians. According to historian Norman Davies the Poles killed approximately 340 civilians, 2/3 of them Ukrainians and the rest Jews. According to Christoph Mick, only Jews were killed during these events and Ukrainians, while subject to hostile acts, were not murdered.

According to Polish historians, during the course of the war, Ukrainian forces conducted massacres against the Polish population in Sokolniki where 500 buildings were burned down and circa 50 Poles killed. In Zamarstynow, a Ukrainian commander accused the Polish civilian population of supporting the Polish side and allowed for brutal house searchers by his troops in which civilians were beaten, robbed, murdered and raped. Ukrainian forces also murdered prisoners of war during these events. A day later, Polish troops executed a group of Ukrainian prisoners in retaliation. On 24 November 1919, the village of Bilka Szlachecka was attacked by Ukrainian forces, burned down and its civilian population massacred, with 45 civilians murdered and 22 wounded. In Chodaczkow Wielki, 4 Polish girls were murdered by Ukrainian soldiers and their bodies mutilated. A special Polish commission for investigation of these atrocities established that even more drastic events occurred, but refused to blame Ukrainian nation for them, putting the blame for them on small percentage of Ukrainian society, mainly soldiers, peasants and so called "half-intelligentsia", that is village teachers, officers and members of gendarmerie. The commission, which included representatives from Italy and France, established that in just three districts 90 murders were committed on civilians besides robberies. Numerous churches desecrated by Ukrainian forces as well. Nuns from three cloisters were raped and later murdered by being blown up by explosive grenades. There were cases of people being buried alive. The commission also noted however that several Ukrainian villagers had hidden Poles. The head of the commission, Zamorski recommended imprisonment of culprits of the atrocities, while establishing friendly relationship with Ukrainian population based on existing laws.

Overall, although there is no evidence of government-controlled mass persecutions of civilians by either the Ukrainians or the Poles, given the paramilitary nature of the fighting atrocities were committed by soldiers or paramilitaries from both sides.

== Aftermath ==
Approximately 10,000 Poles and 15,000 Ukrainians, mostly soldiers, died during this war. Ukrainian POWs were kept in ex-Austrian POW camps in Dąbie (Kraków), Łańcut, Pikulice, Strzałków, and Wadowice.

Both sides conducted mass arrests of civilians. By July 1919, as many as 25,000 Poles ended up in Ukrainian internment camps, in Zhovkva, Zolochiv, Mykulyntsi, Strusiv, Yazlovets, Kolomyya and Kosiv. Interned Polish civilians, soldiers and Catholic priests were held during the winter months in unheated barracks or railway cars with little food, many subsequently died from exposure to the cold, starvation and typhoid. In Polish prisoner-of-war camps, 23,000–24,000 Ukrainian soldiers and members of the administration were held by the end of 1919. Sanitary conditions there were only slightly better than in the Ukrainian camps. After the Polish-Soviet war, approximately 100,000 Ukrainians passed through these camps; it is estimated that about 20% of the inmates died, primarily as a result of infectious diseases.

Following the war, the French, who had supported Poland diplomatically and militarily, obtained control over the eastern Galician oil fields under conditions that were very unfavorable to Poland. In the beginning of the Second World War, the Soviets annexed parts of Poland which included Galicia and Volhynia. Galicia and Volhynia were attached to Ukraine, which at that time was a republic of the Soviet Union. According to the Yalta Conference decisions, while the Polish population of Eastern Galicia was resettled to Poland, the borders of which were shifted westwards, the region itself remained within Soviet Ukraine after the war and currently forms the westernmost part of now independent Ukraine.

== Legacy ==
Although the 70 to 75 thousand men who fought in the Ukrainian Galician Army lost their war, and Galicia became Polish, the experience of proclaiming a Ukrainian state and fighting for it significantly intensified and deepened the nationalistic Ukrainian orientation within Galicia. Since the interwar era, Galicia has been the center of Ukrainian nationalism.

According to a noted interwar Polish publicist, the Polish–Ukrainian War was the principal cause for the failure to establish a Ukrainian state in Kyiv in late 1918 and early 1919. During that critical time the Galician forces, large, well-disciplined and immune to Communist subversion, could have tilted the balance of power in favor of a Ukrainian state. Instead, it focused all of its resources on defending its Galician homeland. When the western Ukrainian forces transferred east in the summer of 1919 after they had been overwhelmed by the Poles, the Russian forces had grown significantly, and the impact of the Galicians was no longer decisive.

After the war, the Ukrainian soldiers who fought became the subject of folk songs and their graves a site of annual pilgrimages in western Ukraine which persisted into Soviet times despite persecution by the Soviet authorities of those honoring the Ukrainian troops.

For Poles living in Eastern Galicia, the victory of the Polish forces over the Ukrainian Galician Army and the prospect of the region becoming part of the newly reconstructed Polish Republic, after 146 years of foreign domination caused a great wave of excitement. In the years after the war, battles such as that of Lviv were remembered as outstanding examples of Polish heroism and resilience. Children and young defenders of the Łyczakowski Cemetery, who lost their lives defending the city, such as Jerzy Bitschan became household names in Poland during the interwar period.

== See also ==
- Battle of Lwów (1918)
- Komancza Republic
- Lwów Eaglets
- Polish–Romanian alliance
- Romanian occupation of Pokuttia
- Treaty of Riga
- Ukrainian Galician Army
- Ukrainian–Soviet War
- Ukrainian War of Independence
- 37th Łęczyca Infantry Regiment

== Bibliography ==
- (in Polish) Marek Figura, Konflikt polsko-ukraiński w prasie Polski Zachodniej w latach 1918–1923, Poznań 2001, ISBN 83-7177-013-8
- (in Polish) Karol Grünberg, Bolesław Sprengel, "Trudne sąsiedztwo. Stosunki polsko-ukraińskie w X–XX wieku", Książka i Wiedza, Warszawa 2005, ISBN 83-05-13371-0
- (in Polish) Witold Hupert, Zajęcie Małopolski Wschodniej i Wołynia w roku 1919, Książnica Atlas, Lwów – Warszawa 1928
- Łukomski, Grzegorz; Partacz, Czesław; Polak, Bogusław (1994). Wojna polsko-ukraińska 1918-1919. Koszalin-Warszawa.
- (in Polish) Władysław Pobóg-Malinowski, Najnowsza Historia Polityczna Polski, Tom 2, 1919–1939, London 1956, ISBN 83-03-03164-3
- Paul Robert Magocsi, A History of Ukraine, University of Toronto Press: Toronto 1996, ISBN 0-8020-0830-5
- (in Polish) Władysław A. Serczyk, Historia Ukrainy, 3rd ed., Zakład Narodowy im. Ossolińskich, Wrocław 2001, ISBN 83-04-04530-3
- Leonid Zaszkilniak, The origins of the Polish-Ukrainian conflict in 1918–1919, Lviv
- Paul S. Valasek, Haller's Polish Army in France, Chicago: 2006 ISBN 0-9779757-0-3
- Stephen Velychenko, "Polish Excesses and Atrocities against Ukrainians in Western Ukraine 1918-20," (unpublished discussion paper- sept 2024) <https://resource.history.org.ua/item/0018898>.

(ukr.) Західно-Українська Народна Республіка 1918–1923. Енциклопедія. Т. 1 [archive]: А–Ж. Івано-Франківськ : Манускрипт-Львів, 2018. 688 с. ISBN 978-966-2067-44-6

(ukr.) Західно-Українська Народна Республіка 1918–1923. Енциклопедія. Т. 2 [archive]: З–О. Івано-Франківськ : Манускрипт-Львів, 2019. 832 с. ISBN 978-966-2067-61-3

(ukr.) Західно-Українська Народна Республіка 1918–1923. Енциклопедія. Т. 3 [archive]: П –С. Івано-Франківськ: Манускрипт-Львів, 2020.576 с. ISBN 978-966-2067-65-1

(ukr.) Західно-Українська Народна Республіка 1918–1923. Енциклопедія. Т. 4 [archive]: Т - Я. Івано-Франківськ: Манускрипт-Львів, 2021.688 с. ISBN 978-966-2067-72-9
