= Symon Petliura =

Ukrainian military leader (1879–1926)

- Симон Петлюра
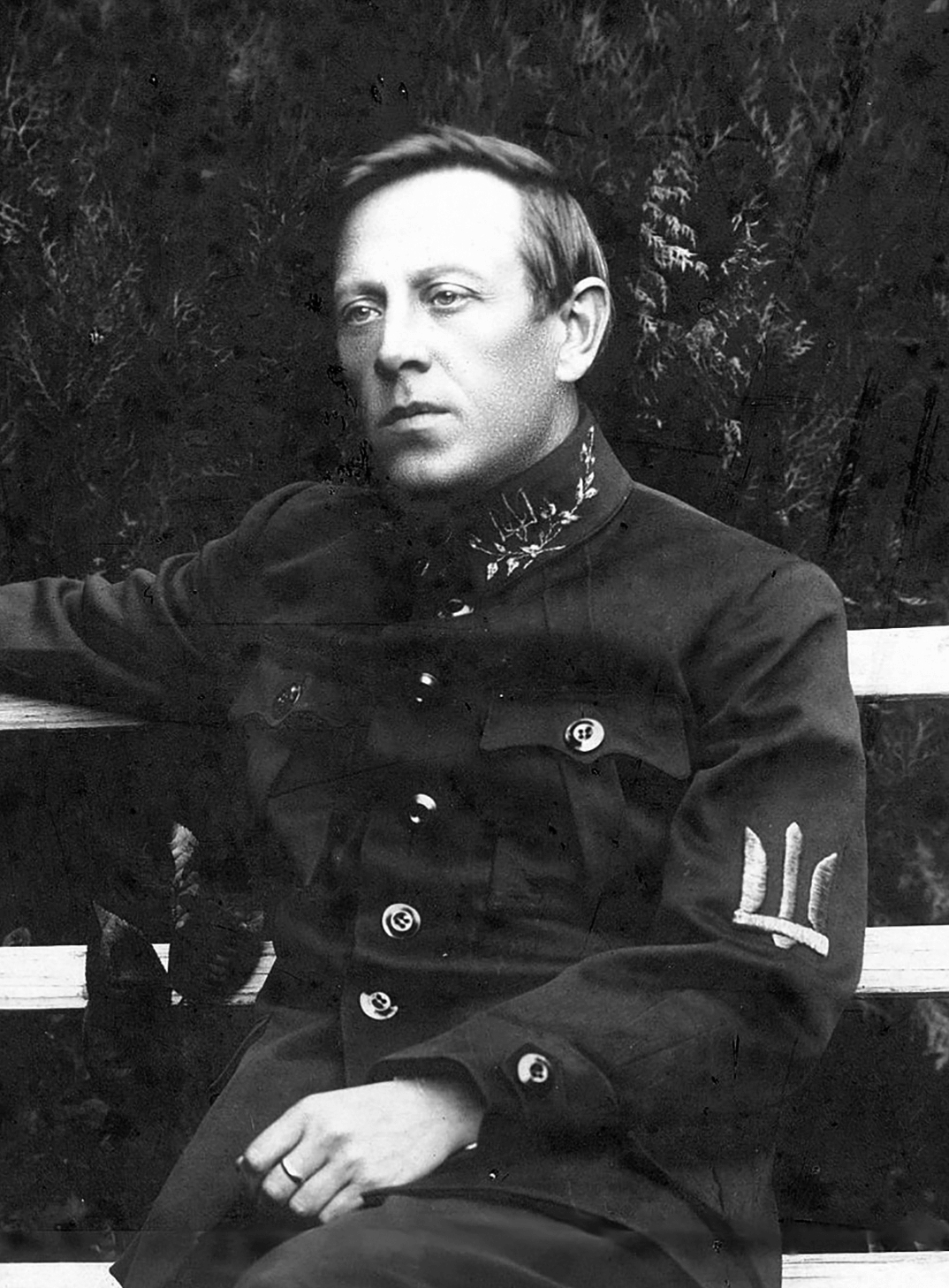
- Petliura in 1919

2nd Chairman of the Directorate
- In office 11 February 1919 – 25 May 1926 (In exile from 18 March 1921)
- Prime Minister: Serhiy Ostapenko; Borys Martos; Isaak Mazepa; Vyacheslav Prokopovych
- Preceded by: Volodymyr Vynnychenko
- Succeeded by: Andriy Livytskyi^{1}

1st Secretary of Military Affairs
- In office 28 June 1917 – 6 January 1918
- Prime Minister: Volodymyr Vynnychenko
- Preceded by: Position established
- Succeeded by: Mykola Porsh

Personal details
- Born: 22 May 1879 Poltava, Russian Empire (now in Ukraine)
- Died: 25 May 1926 (aged 47) Paris, France
- Party: RUP (1900–1905); USDLP (1905–1919)
- Spouse: Olha Bilska (m. 1910)
- Children: 1
- Occupation: Military commander; politician; journalist
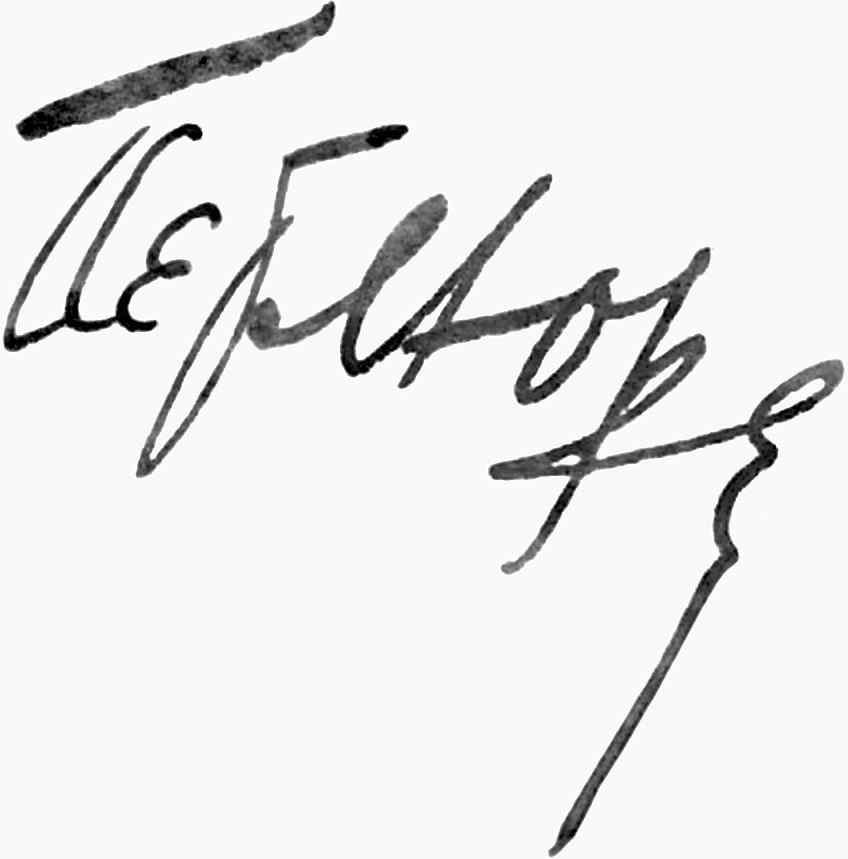
- Signature

Military service
- Allegiance: Ukrainian People's Republic
- Branch/service: Ukrainian People's Army
- Years of service: 1914–1922
- Rank: Chief Otaman
- Commands: Haidamaka Kish of Sloboda Ukraine
- Battles/wars: See list: Ukrainian War of Independence; Ukrainian–Soviet War; Occupation of Poltava by the Bolsheviks (1918–1919); Ukrainian anti-Soviet campaign (1919); Proskuriv offensive; Aleksandrovsk Bolshevik Uprising; First Winter Campaign; Battle of Kiev (January 1919); Kiev offensive (1920); Kyiv January Uprising; 1919 Soviet invasion of Ukraine; Anti-Hetman Uprising; Polish–Ukrainian War; Polish–Soviet War
- ^{1}As President of Ukraine in exile

Symon Vasyliovych Petliura (Note: Also rendered as Simon Petlura, Symon Petlura, or Symon Petlyura.) (Ukrainian: Симон Васильович Петлюра, Ukrainian pronunciation: [ˈsɪmon ʋɐˈsɪlʲowɪt͡ʃ petˈlʲurɐ]; 22 May [O.S. 10 May] 1879 – 25 May 1926) was a Ukrainian revolutionary, politician and journalist. He was the Supreme Commander of the Ukrainian People's Army (UNA) and led the Ukrainian People's Republic during the Ukrainian War of Independence, a part of the wider Russian Civil War.

Petliura was born to a family of Cossack heritage in Poltava. From an early age he embraced socialism and Ukrainian nationalism, which he advocated through his highly prolific career as a journalist. After the 1917 February Revolution overthrew the Tsarist monarchy, the Ukrainian People's Republic was proclaimed and Petliura was elected head of its military. The Republic was briefly interrupted by the pro-German Ukrainian State, but in late 1918 Petliura, along with other members of the socialist Directorate of Ukraine, organised a revolt and overthrew the regime, restoring the Republic. He became the leader of the Directorate in early 1919, after the Bolsheviks invaded Ukraine and captured its capital. Facing imminent defeat, Petliura entered an alliance with Józef Piłsudski's Poland. The Polish–Soviet War concluded with Poland remaining independent and gaining some Ukrainian and Belarusian lands, while most of Ukraine remained under Soviet control, forcing Petliura into exile. He initially directed the government-in-exile from Poland, but eventually settled in Paris.

During the Civil War, the UNA were responsible for the deaths of tens of thousands of Jewish civilians, and Petliura's role in the pogroms has been a topic of dispute. In 1926, Petliura was assassinated in Paris by Jewish anarchist Sholem Schwarzbard, who had lost relatives in the pogroms.

== Career before 1917 ==
=== Early years ===
Born on 22 May [O.S. 10 May] 1879 in a suburb of Poltava (then part of the Russian Empire), Symon Petliura was the son of Vasyl Pavlovych Petliura and Olha Oleksiyivna (née Marchenko), of Cossack background. His father, a Poltava city resident, had owned a transportation business; his mother was a daughter of an Orthodox hieromonk (priest-monk). Petliura obtained his initial education in parochial schools, and planned to become an Orthodox priest. (Note: The Petliura family was very pious. His two sisters became nuns and his nephew Stepan Ivanovych Skrypnyk became the Patriarch Mstyslav of the Ukrainian Orthodox Church (in office 1991-1993).)

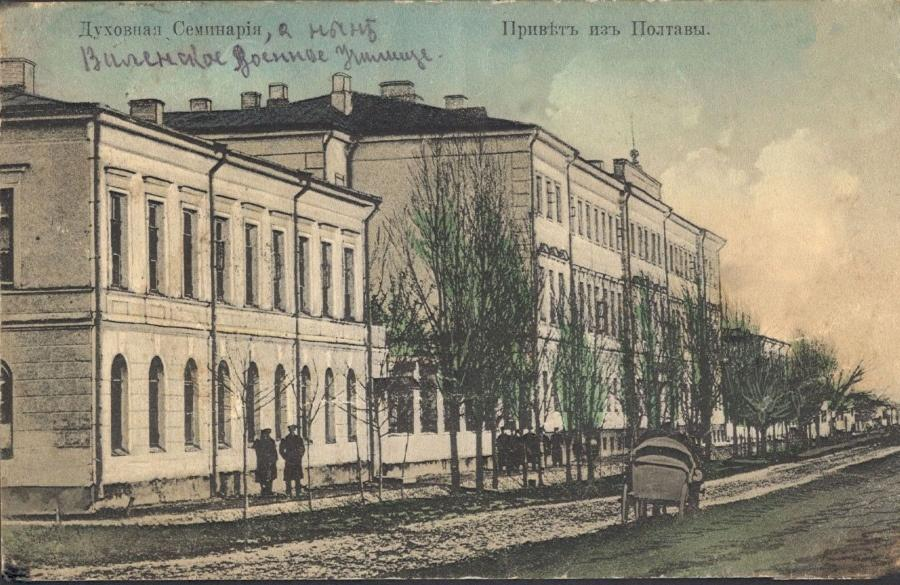
The building of the Poltava Theological Seminary at the beginning of the 20th century

Petliura studied in the Russian Orthodox Seminary in Poltava from 1895 to 1901. While there he joined the Hromada society in 1898. When his membership in Hromada was discovered in 1901, he was expelled from the seminary. In 1900 Petliura joined the Revolutionary Ukrainian Party (RUP). In 1902, under threat of arrest, he moved to Yekaterinodar in the Kuban, where he worked for two years – initially as a schoolteacher and later as an archivist for the Kuban Cossack Host helping to organize over 200,000 documents. In December 1903 he was arrested for organizing a RUP branch in Yekaterinodar and for publishing inflammatory anti-tsarist articles in the Ukrainian press outside of Imperial Russia (in Austrian-controlled Lemberg, currently named Lviv, in Galicia). Released on bail in March 1904, he moved briefly to Kyiv and then to Lemberg.

=== Work as a journalist ===
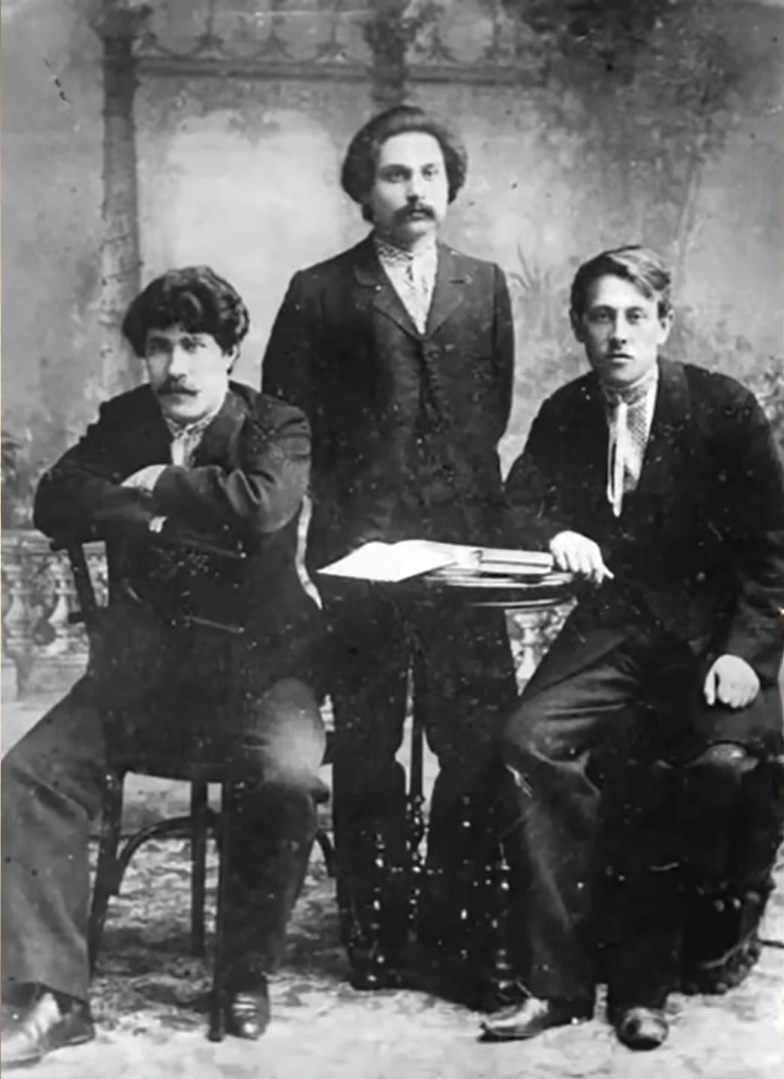
A photo of Petliura (on the right) with his friends, c. 1905

In Lviv, Petliura lived under the name of Sviatoslav Tagon, working alongside Ivan Franko and Volodymyr Hnatiuk as an editor for the journal Literaturno-Naukovyi Vistnyk ("Literary Scientific Herald"), the Shevchenko Scientific Society and as a co-editor of Volya newspaper. He also contributed numerous articles to the Ukrainian-language press in Galicia.

At the end of 1905, after a nationwide amnesty was declared by the authorities, Petliura returned briefly to Kyiv. As the Ukrainian language had been outlawed in the Russian Empire by the Ems Ukaz of 1876, Petliura found more freedom to publish Ukrainian-oriented articles in Saint Petersburg than in Ukraine, and soon moved to the Russian capital in order to publish the socialist-democratic monthly magazine Vil’na Ukrayina ("Free Ukraine") along with Prokip Poniatenko and Mykola Porsh. After Russian censors closed this magazine in July 1905, he moved back to Kyiv where he worked for the newspaper Rada ("The Council"). In 1907–09 he became the editor of the literary magazine Slovo (Ukrainian: Слово, The Word) and co-editor of Ukrayina (Ukrainian: Україна, "Ukraine").

In 1909, these publications were closed by Russian imperial police, and Petliura moved back to Moscow, where he briefly worked as an accountant. Soon he became a co-editor of the Moscow-based Russian-language journal Ukrayinskaya Zhizn, aimed to familiarize the local population with news and culture of what was known as Malorossia (Little Russia). He was the chief editor of the publication from 1912 to 1914 and served as its co-editor until May 1917.

During World War I, he expressed his position regarding the war in a response article titled "War and Ukrainians." In this publication, he argued that Ukrainians, as subjects of the Russian Empire, were obliged to loyally fulfill their duty to the Tsar, and expressed the hope that in the future the attitude of the Tsarist authorities towards the Ukrainian question would change.

Petliura assured the government that Ukrainians "will not succumb to provocative influences and will fulfill their duty as citizens of Russia at this difficult time until the end", and stated that he was in favor of the unification of all Ukrainians (including Galicians) under the auspices of Russia

== Revolution in Ukraine ==
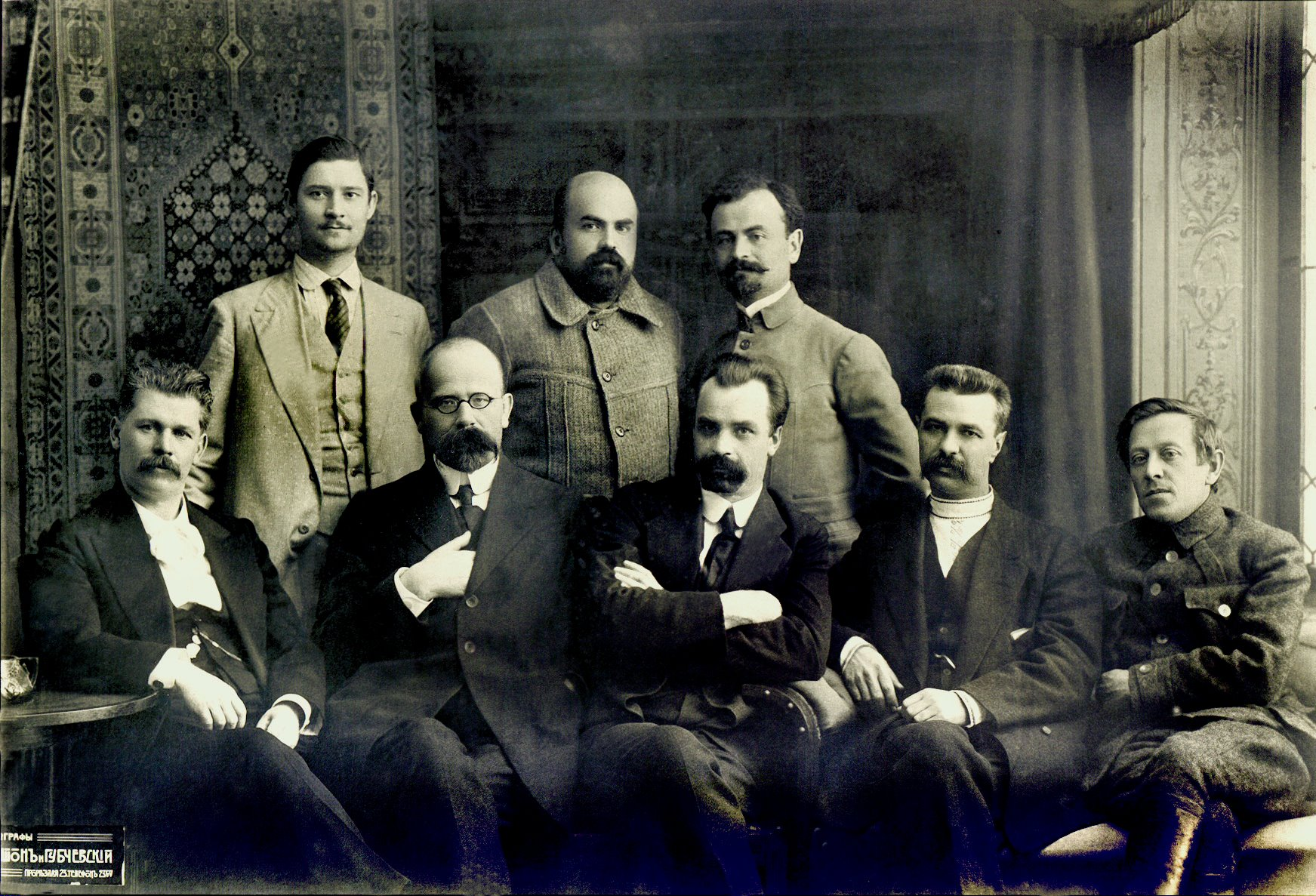
Members of the first General Secretariat of the Ukrainian Central Rada. 1917 year. Standing (from left to right): Pavlo Khrystiuk, Mykola Stasiuk, Borys Martos. Seated (from left to right): Ivan Steshenko, Khrystofor Baranovskyi, Volodymyr Vynnychenko, Serhii Yefremov, Symon Petliura

=== Rise to power ===
In May 1917 Petliura attended the First All-Ukrainian Congress of Soldier Deputies held in Kyiv as a delegate. On 18 May he was elected head of the Ukrainian General Military Committee. With the proclamation of the Central Rada on 28 June 1917, Petliura became the first Secretary (Minister) for Military Affairs.

Disagreeing with the politics of the then chairman of the General Secretariat Volodymyr Vynnychenko, Petliura left the government and became the head of the Haydamaky Kish, a military formation of Sloboda Ukraine (in Kharkiv). In January–February 1918 the Haidamaky Kish was forced back to protect Kyiv during the Uprising at the Kyiv Arsenal Plant and to prevent the capture of the capital by the Bolshevik Red Guard.

After the April 1918 Ukrainian coup d'état, Pavlo Skoropadskyi's government arrested Petliura and incarcerated him for four months in Bila Tserkva.

Petliura participated in the Anti-Hetman Uprising of November 1918 and became a member of the Directorate of Ukraine as the Chief of Military Forces. Following the Bolshevik takeover of Kyiv (February 1919) and the emigration of Vynnychenko from Ukraine, Petliura became the leader of the Directorate on 11 February 1919. In his capacity as head of the Army and State, he continued to fight both Bolshevik and White forces in Ukraine for the next ten months.

=== 1919 ===
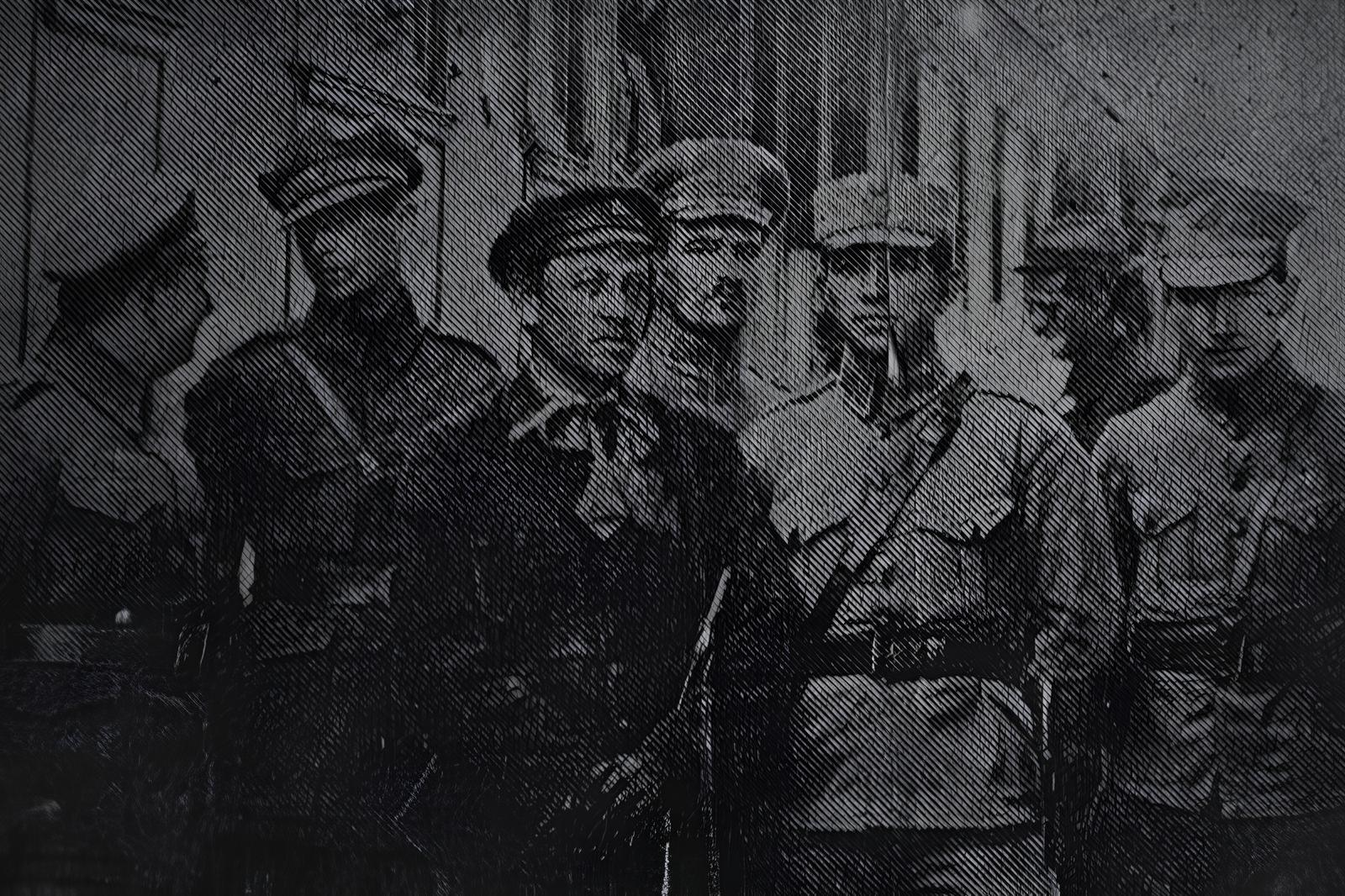
Petliura meeting soldiers of the Ukrainian Galician Army in Kamianets-Podilskyi, August 1919

With the outbreak of hostilities between Ukraine and Soviet Russia in January 1919, and with Vynnychenko's emigration, Petliura ultimately became the leading figure in the Directorate. During the winter of 1919 the Petliura army lost most of Ukraine (including Kyiv) to Bolsheviks and by 6 March relocated to Podolia. In the spring of 1919 he managed to extinguish a coup-d'etat led by Volodymyr Oskilko who saw Petliura cooperating with socialists such as Borys Martos. During the course of the year, Petliura continued to defend the fledgling republic against incursions by the Bolsheviks, Anton Denikin's White Russians, and the Romanian-Polish troops. By autumn of 1919, most of Denikin's White Russian forces were defeated — in the meantime, however, the Bolsheviks had grown to become the dominant force in Ukraine.

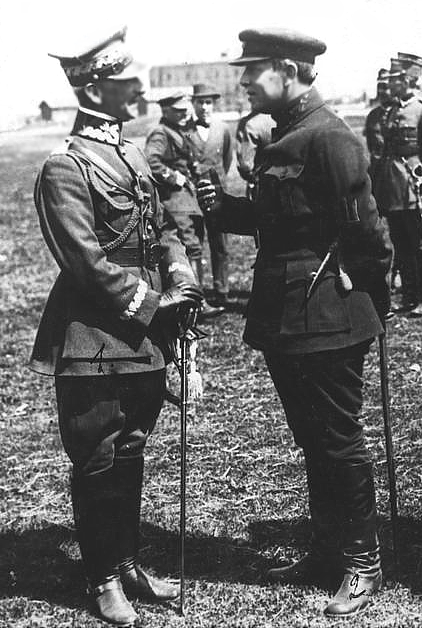
Polish General Antoni Listowski and Symon Petliura in Berdychiv during the Kyiv offensive

=== 1920 ===
On 5 December 1919, Petliura withdrew to Poland, which had previously recognized him as the head of the legal government of Ukraine. In April 1920, as head of the Ukrainian People's Republic, he signed an alliance in Warsaw with the Polish government, agreeing to a border on the River Zbruch and recognizing Poland's right to Galicia in exchange for military aid in overthrowing the Bolshevik régime. Polish forces, reinforced by Petliura's remaining troops (some two divisions), attacked Kyiv on 7 May 1920, in what proved a turning point of the 1919–21 Polish-Bolshevik war. Following initial successes, Piłsudski's and Petliura's forces had to retreat to the Vistula River and to the Polish capital, Warsaw. The Polish Army, supported by Ukrainian units, defeated the Bolshevik Russians in the end, but the Red Army remained in parts of Ukraine and therefore Ukrainians were unable to secure their independence. Starting from late 1920, Petliura directed the affairs of the Ukrainian government-in-exile from Tarnów in Lesser Poland. When the Soviet government in Moscow requested Petliura's extradition from Poland, the Poles engineered his "disappearance", secretly moving him from Tarnów to Warsaw.

== After the revolution ==
=== Life in exile ===
Bolshevik Russia persistently demanded that Petliura be handed over. Protected by several Polish friends and colleagues, such as Henryk Józewski, in late 1923, one year after the establishment of the Soviet Union, Petliura left Poland. Travelling through Budapest, Vienna, Zurich and Geneva under the pseudonym Stepan Mohyla, in October 1924 he arrived to Paris together with former Ukrainian prime minister Viacheslav Prokopovych.

In Paris, Petliura directed the activities of the government of the Ukrainian National Republic in exile. In October 1925 he established the Ukrainian-language newspaper Tryzub, and continued to edit and write numerous articles under various pen names with an emphasis on questions dealing with national oppression in Ukraine. These articles were written with a literary flair. The question of national awareness was often of significance in his literary work.

Living in Paris, Petliura spent a lot of time reading books and took daily walks around the city, visiting art galleries, museums and historical cemeteries.

=== Assassination ===
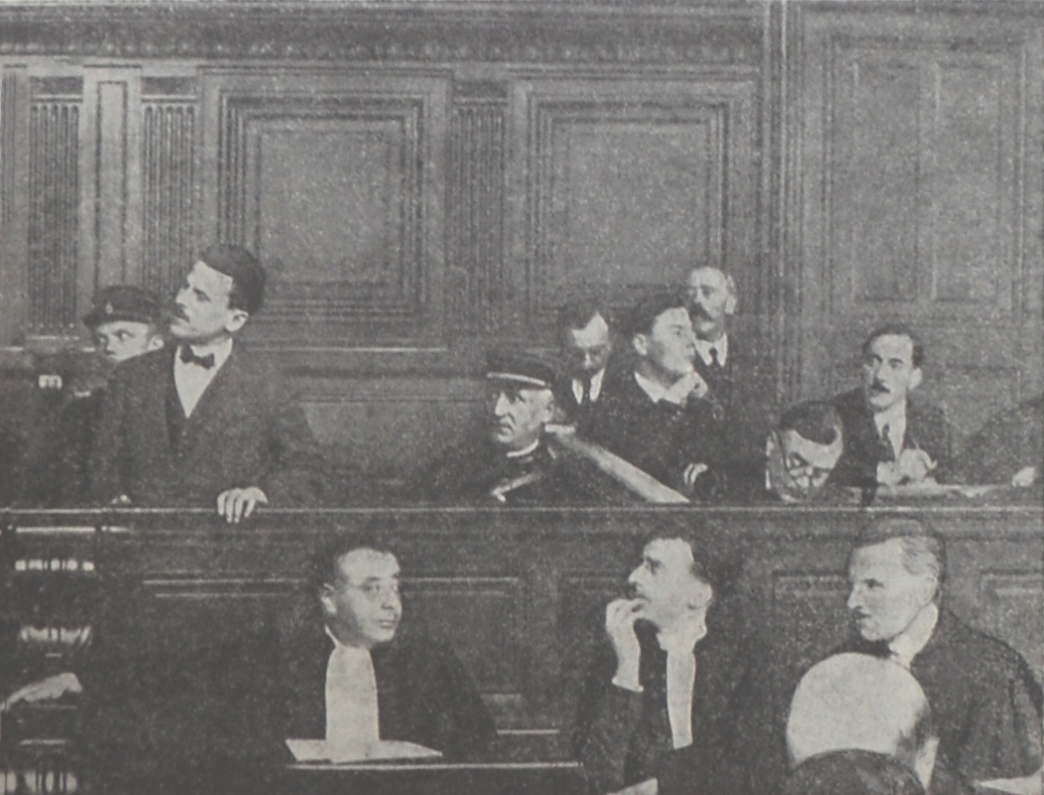
Petliura's assassin Sholom Shwartzbard (upper left) on trial in 1927

On 25 May 1926, at 14:12, by the Gibert bookstore, Petliura was walking on Rue Racine near Boulevard Saint-Michel of the Latin Quarter in Paris and was approached by Sholem Schwarzbard. Schwarzbard asked him in Ukrainian, "Are you Mr. Petliura?" Petliura did not answer but raised his walking cane. Schwarzbard pulled out a gun, proclaimed "dirty dog, killer of my people, defend yourself!" and shot him five times. Evading a lynch-mob attempting to avenge Petliura, Schwarzbard surrendered to the police with a note reading: "I have killed Petliura to avenge the death of the thousands of pogrom victims in Ukraine who were massacred by Petliura's forces without his taking any steps to prevent these massacres." The wounded Petliura was transported to the Charité hospital, where he died at 14:35 on the same day.

The Jewish Telegraphic Agency reported on 27 May 1926 that Petliura's "pogrom bands" were responsible for killing tens of thousands of Jews.

Schwarzbard was an anarchist of Jewish descent, born in Ukraine. He participated in the Jewish self-defense of Balta in 1905. The Russian Tsarist government sentenced him to 3 months in prison for "provoking" the Balta pogrom. He was twice convicted of taking part in anarchist "expropriation" (burglary) and bank robbery in Austria-Hungary. He later joined the French Foreign Legion (1914–1917) and was wounded in the Battle of the Somme. It is reported that Schwarzbard told famous fellow anarchist leader Nestor Makhno in Paris that he was terminally ill and expected to die and that he would take Petliura with him; Makhno forbade Schwarzbard to do so.

Schwarzbard's parents were among fifteen members of his family murdered in the pogroms in Odesa. The core defense at the Schwarzbard trial was — as presented by the noted jurist Henry Torrès — that he was avenging the deaths of more than 50,000 Jewish victims of the pogroms, whereas the prosecution (both criminal and civil) tried to show that Petliura was not responsible for the pogroms and that Schwarzbard was a Soviet agent. After a trial lasting eight days the jury acquitted Schwarzbard.

According to a defected KGB operative Peter Deriabin, who was five years old at the time when Petliura was killed, Schwarzbard was a Soviet (NKVD) agent and acted on the order from a former chairman of the Soviet Ukrainian government and current Soviet Ambassador to France, Christian Rakovsky. The special operation of the GPU was consolidated by GPU agent Mikhail Volodin, who arrived in France 8 August 1925, and who had been in close contact with Schwarzbard.

It is claimed that in March 1926, Vlas Chubar (Chairman of the Council of People's Commissars of Ukraine), in a speech given in Kharkiv and repeated in Moscow, warned of the danger Petliura represented to Soviet power. It was after this speech that the command had allegedly been given to assassinate Petliura.

=== Funeral ===
The memorial service for Symon Petliura was held in the Romanian Orthodox Church in Paris, which Petliura had attended for Sunday services. Petliura's coffin was decorated with a shield bearing a flower ornament depicting the Coat of Arms of Ukraine. The funeral train was adorned with the banner of the head of state (in 1992 it was transferred to the National Guard of Ukraine and is currently exhibited at the National Military History Museum in Kyiv), the flag of the 3rd Iron Division of the Ukrainian People's Army and a golden sabre covered with the otaman's hat.

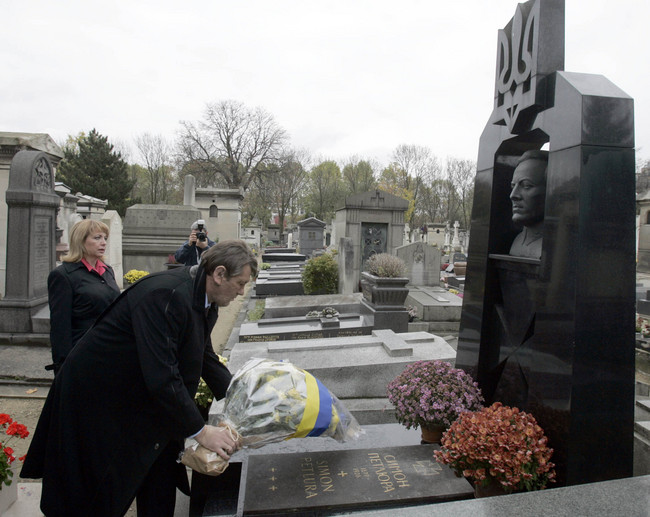
Ukrainian President Victor Yushchenko and his wife laying flowers at Symon Petliura's grave in Paris, 2005

The ceremony was presided by Romanian and Ukrainian Orthodox priests, and attended by Petliura's wife Olha and numerous guests, including head of the Ukrainian government-in-exile Andriy Livytskyi and Ukrainian army officers. Non-Ukrainian attendees included representatives of pro-independence governments from Georgia, Azerbaijan, North Caucasus and Turkestan, Polish diplomats, ordinary civilians and students from France, Czechia, England, Romania and other countries. Symon Petliura was buried on 30 May 1926 in the Cimetière du Montparnasse in Paris; his wife and daughter would be later interred in the same grave. The burial was accompanied with the singing of Taras Shevchenko's Testament. Vigils were also held in various countries populated by Ukrainian emigrants, as well as cities in Polish-controlled Volhynia and East Galicia. The service in Berlin was attended by Petliura's former political enemy Pavlo Skoropadsky.

In 1942 the chapel of the hospital where Petlura died was transferred to the Ukrainian Greek Catholic Church, becoming St. Volodymyr the Great's Cathedral. Every year on 25 May, the anniversary of Petliura's murder, a vigil is held by the Ukrainian community on his grave.

== Family ==
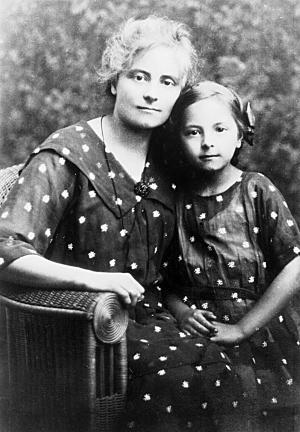
Petliura's wife Olha with daughter Lesia

During his work in Moscow, in 1910 Petliura married Olha Bilska (1885–1959), later also known under her husband's pseudonym Marchenko. The couple had a daughter, Lesia (1911–1942).

Petliura's two sisters, Orthodox nuns who had remained in Poltava, were arrested and shot in 1928 by the NKVD.

A nephew of Symon Petliura, Stepan Skrypnyk, became Patriarch Mstyslav of the Ukrainian Autocephalous Orthodox Church on 6 June 1990.

== Historical role ==
=== Role in pogroms ===
Petliura is considered a controversial figure connected with the pogroms of Jews during his rule of the Ukrainian National Republic. According to Peter Kenez, "before the advent of Hitler, the greatest mass murder of Jews occurs in Ukraine in the course of the Civil War. All participants in the conflict were guilty of murdering Jews, even the Bolsheviks; however the Volunteer Army had the largest number of victims." The number of Jews killed during the period is estimated to be between 50,000 and 200,000. A total of 1,236 violent attacks on Jews had been recorded between 1918 and 1921 in Ukraine. Among them, 493 were carried out by Ukrainian People's Republic soldiers under the command of Symon Petliura, 307 by independent Ukrainian warlords, 213 by Denikin's army, 106 by the Red Army, and 32 by the Polish Army.

Order Issued by the Main Command of the Armies of the Ukrainian National Republic

It is time to realize that the world Jewish population—their children, their women—was enslaved and deprived of its national freedom, just like we were.
It should not go anywhere away from us; it has been living with us since time immemorial, sharing our fate and misfortune with us.
I decisively order that all those who will be inciting you to carry out pogroms be expelled from our army and tried as traitors of the Motherland. Let the courts try them for their actions, without sparing the criminals the severest punishments according to the law. The government of the UNR, understanding all the harm that pogroms inflict on the state, has issued a proclamation to the entire population of the land, with the appeal to oppose all measures by enemies that instigate pogroms against the Jewish population...

— Chief Otaman Petliura, 26 August 1919

The newly formed Ukrainian state (Ukrainian People's Republic) promised Jews full equality and autonomy. Arnold Margolin, a Jewish assistant minister in Petliura's UPR government, declared in May 1919 that the Ukrainian government had given Jews more rights than they enjoyed in any other European government. However, after 1918, military units became involved in pogroms against Jews. During Petliura's term as Head of State (1919–20), pogroms continued to be perpetrated on Ukrainian territory.

Petliura's role in the pogroms has been a topic of dispute since his assassination in 1926 and the succeeding Schwarzbard's trial. Petliura's own party, USDRP, denied his complicity in the episodes of anti-Jewish violence in Ukraine between 1918 and 1920. This led to the creation of a commission by the Labour and Socialist International, which had to define if Petliura could be held responsible for the crimes. A summary prepared by Menshevik representative Raphael Abramovitch concluded, that while Petliura didn't personally order the pogroms, his government tolerated them, and open condemnation of the crimes by Ukrainian authorities only started after they attempted to gain international support by improving own public image. The publishing of the report in 1928 caused a protest from USDRP representative Isaak Mazepa, who accused the commission's members of attempts to disrupt relations between Ukrainians and Jews. At the same time, a publication by the Polish Socialist Party claimed, that the result of the commission's investigation had rehabilitated Petliura. As an answer to this claim, Abramovitch wrote a letter to the editor's office, in which it was stated, that although Petliura had not organized the pogroms, he didn't combat them energetically enough due to "national-tactical reasons". Abramovitch's point of view was supported by Poale Zion.

Shortly after Petliura's assassination, Revisionist Zionist leader Ze'ev Jabotinsky in his interview to Jewish Morning Journal stated, that "Neither Petliura nor Vynnychenko or the rest of the distinguished members of this Ukrainian government were ever people who could be called 'pogromists.' [...] I know well this type of Ukrainian nationalist intellectual with socialist views. I grew up with them; together with them, I conducted a struggle against antisemites and Russifiers — Jewish and Ukrainian. No one will convince either me or other thinking Zionists of southern Russia that people of this type can be regarded as antisemites." However, one year later, in a letter to Paris-based Russian-language newspaper Posledniye Novosti, Jabotinsky claimed, that his position had been interpreted incorrectly. In his article Petliura and the Pogroms, which appeared soon thereafter, he once again insisted on the non-complicity of Petliura and the broader Ukrainian national movement in the pogroms, but held them responsible for being unable to stop those crimes.

In 1969, the journal Jewish Social Studies published two opposing views regarding Petliura's responsibility in pogroms against Jews during his reign over Ukraine, by scholars Taras Hunczak and Zosa Szajkowski. Later the Journal published letters from the two authors. According to Hunczak, Petliura actively sought to halt anti-Jewish violence on numerous occasions, introducing capital punishment for carrying out pogroms. Conversely, he is also accused of not having done enough to stop the pogroms and being afraid to punish officers and soldiers engaged in crimes against Jews for fear of losing their support.

=== Role in the development of Ukrainian culture ===
A collection of literary critical articles published by Petliura in 1918 in Kyiv

An active participant of social life, during his seminary years Petliura took part in strike actions demanding the introduction of Ukraine-oriented subjects in schools. He frequently performed as a singer (his most favourite songs were reportedly Ivan Franko's Ne pora ("It's not time"), Shaliyte ("Rage, Tyrants") and Shevchenko's Zapovit ("Testament")) and conducted a students' choir. One of the causes of his expulsion from the institution was the choir's performance of a cantata by Mykola Lysenko, which had been banned by Russian censorship. After being expelled, Petliura earned his bread through private lessons. Despite the hardships, he was enthusiastic about the promotion of Ukrainian culture among ethnic Russians, and even made a Russian translation of one of the works by Ivan Franko.

As the editor of numerous journals and newspapers, Petliura published over 15,000 critical articles, reviews, stories and poems under an estimated 120 noms-de-plume. His articles were dedicated to various cultural topics, including popular education, opening of the Archaeological Museum in Katerynoslav, excavation at the Zaporozhian Sich, performances of Ukrainian theatre in Kuban, publication of the Ukrainian Bible in London etc.

During his work at the Rada newspaper, Petliura wrote reviews of music, theatre, literature and arts, and also gave lectures on the topic of Ukrainian drama. He supported the introduction of socially important topics into the Ukrainian art and criticized the excessive reliance of Ukrainian culture on ethnographic material. Already during that time Petliura promoted Ukrainian cultural diplomacy and condemned antisemitic stereotypes in works of art. Petliura was also one of the first Ukrainian publicists to pay attention to the topic of economic security among art workers. His prolific work in both the Russian and Ukrainian languages helped shape the mindset of the Ukrainian population in the years leading up to the Revolution in both Eastern and Western Ukraine. Petliura's correspondence was of great benefit when the Revolution broke out in 1917, as he had contacts throughout Ukraine.

During his years in Russia's capital cities, Petliura played an active role in the life of local Ukrainian communities. Among others, he took part in the organization of the funeral of Ukrainian aviation pioneer Levko Matsiyevych, who died as a result of an air accident in Saint Petersburg in 1910. Working as an editor in Moscow, Petliura created numerous articles representing Ukrainian culture and its prominent figures for the Russian audience.

As head of the Ukrainian military, Petliura was aware of the importance of cultural work in the army. He called Ukrainians to donate books for soldiers fighting on the front and ordered to create libraries in military units. As head of the All-Ukrainian Zemstvo Union under the rule of hetman Skoropadsky, he saw the organization's aim in uniting people from all Ukrainian lands around the task of developing their national culture. Petliura's plans on the post included the creation public schools, establishment of a registry of valuable architectural monuments, repavement of historically important roads and development of a modern memorial complex at Taras Shevchenko's grave in Kaniv. Even during his imprisonment by the hetman's government Petliura continued his work, editing a literary collection and translating a novel by Colette.

During his time as leader of the Directorate, Petliura was active in supporting Ukrainian culture both in Ukraine and in the Ukrainian diaspora. He saw the value in gaining international support and recognition of Ukrainian arts through cultural exchanges. Most notably, Petliura actively supported the work of cultural figures such as the choreographer Vasyl Avramenko, conductor Oleksander Koshetz and bandurist Vasyl Yemetz, allowing them to travel internationally and promote an awareness of Ukrainian culture. Koshetz created the Ukrainian Republic Capella and took it on a global tour, giving concerts in Europe and the Americas. One of the concerts by the Capella inspired George Gershwin to write "Summertime", based on the lullaby "Oi Khodyt Son Kolo Vikon" All three musicians later immigrated to the United States.

Petliura introduced the awarding of the title "People's Artist of Ukraine" to artists who had made significant contributions to Ukrainian culture. A similar titled award was reintroduced after a significant break under the Soviet regime. Among those who had received this award was blind kobza player Ivan Kuchuhura-Kucherenko.

In emigration, Petliura continued the struggle for Ukrainian independence as a publicist. In 1924, he became the editor and publisher of the weekly journal Tryzub (Trident). Petliura's articles had a significant impact on the shaping of Ukrainian national awareness in the early 20th century. He published articles and brochures under a variety of noms de plume, including V. Marchenko, V. Salevsky, I. Rokytsky, and O. Riastr.

Soon after Petliura's assassination in 1926, a Ukrainian library named in his honour was established in Paris.

== Image in the media ==
=== Petliura in Ukrainian folk songs ===
During the revolution Petliura became the subject of numerous folk songs, primarily as a hero calling for his people to unite against foreign oppression. His name became synonymous with the call for freedom. 15 songs were recorded by the ethnographer rev. prof. K. Danylevsky. In the songs Petliura is depicted as a soldier, in a manner similar to Robin Hood, mocking Skoropadsky and the Bolshevik Red Guard.

News of Petliura's assassination in the summer of 1926 was marked by numerous revolts in eastern Ukraine particularly in Boromlia, Zhehailivka (Sumy province), Velyka Rublivka, Myloradove (Poltava province), Hlynsk, Bilsk, Kuzemyn and all along the Vorskla River from Okhtyrka to Poltava, Buryn, Nizhyn (Chernihiv province) and other cities. These revolts were brutally pacified by the Soviet administration. The blind kobzars Pavlo Hashchenko and Ivan Kuchuhura Kucherenko composed a duma (epic poem) in memory of Symon Petliura. To date Petliura is the only modern Ukrainian politician to have a duma created and sung in his memory. This duma became popular among the kobzars of left-bank Ukraine and was sung also by Stepan Pasiuha, Petro Drevchenko, Bohushchenko, and Chumak.

The Soviets also tried their hand at portraying Petliura through the arts in order to discredit the Ukrainian national leader. A number of humorous songs appeared in which Petliura is portrayed as a traveling beggar whose only territory is that which is under his train carriage. A number of plays such as The Republic on Wheels by Yakov Mamontov and the opera Shchors by Boris Liatoshinsky and Arsenal by Heorhiy Maiboroda portray Petliura in a negative light, as a lackey who sold out Western Ukraine to Poland, often using the very same melodies which had become popular during the fight for Ukrainian Independence in 1918.

Petliura continues to be portrayed by the Ukrainian people in its folk songs in a manner similar to Taras Shevchenko and Bohdan Khmelnytsky. He is likened to the sun which suddenly stopped shining.

=== Portrayals in film ===
Up to a dozen of films depicting Symon Petliura have been created, most of them in the Soviet Union and independent Ukraine. The most unique of them is the Soviet silent film P.K.P. (Pilsudski Bought Petliura) issued in 1926 and employing some real-life historical figures, including Petliura's former subordinate Yuriy Tyutyunnyk, as actors. Other Soviet movies depicting Petliura are Oleksandr Dovzhenko's Arsenal (1929) and Shchors (1939), as well as post-war Soviet films Pavel Korchagin (1956), The Truth (1957), Kyiv Woman (1958), Human Blood is not Water (1960), Peace to Huts, War to Palaces (1970), Kotsiubynskyi Family (1970), Old Fortress (1973–1976) and On the Blade of the Sword (1986). In most Soviet films the image of Petliura was represented in a comical and humiliating manner, however starting from the 1970s a more neutral, although still negative image started dominating. In independent Ukraine Petliura was depicted in films The Secret Diary of Symon Petliura (2018) and Kruty 1918 (2019).

== Legacy ==
=== Attitudes in Ukraine ===
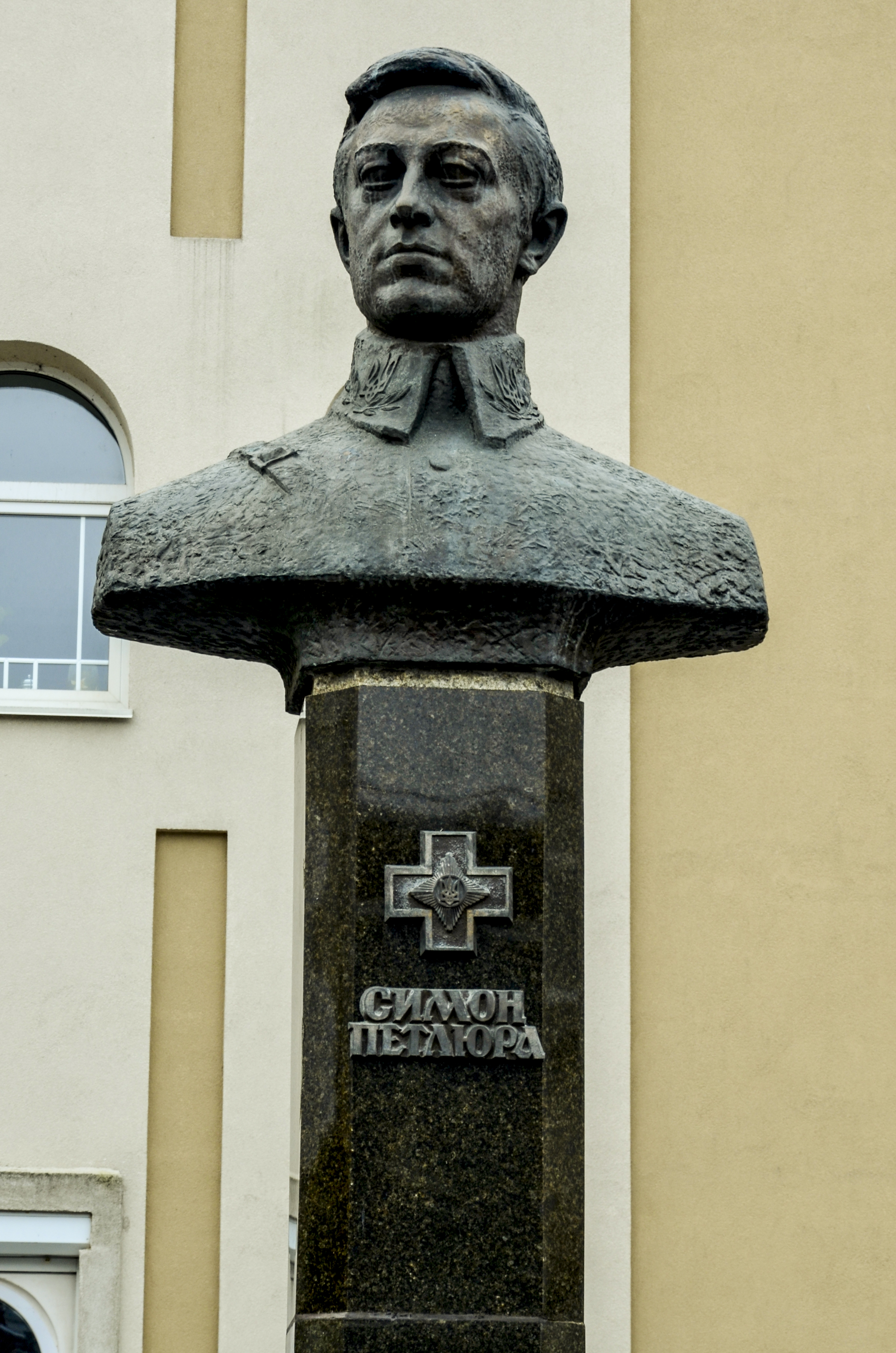
Bust of Symon Petliura in Rivne

With the dissolution of the Soviet Union in 1991, previously restricted Soviet archives have allowed numerous politicians and historians to review Petliura's role in Ukrainian history. Many consider him to be a national hero who strove for the independence of Ukraine. Several cities, including Kyiv, the Ukrainian capital, and Poltava, the city of his birth, have erected monuments to Petliura, with a museum complex also being planned in Poltava. To mark the 80th anniversary of Petliura's assassination, a twelve-volume edition of his writings, including articles, letters and historic documents, has been published in Kyiv by Taras Shevchenko University and the State Archive of Ukraine. In 1992 in Poltava, a series of readings known as "Petliurivski chytannia" have become an annual event, and since 1993, they have taken place annually at Kyiv University.

In modern-day Ukraine, Petliura has not been as lionized as Mykhailo Hrushevsky (who played a much smaller role in the Ukrainian People's Republic), since Petliura was too closely associated with violence to make a good symbolic figure. In a 2008 poll of "Famous Ukrainians of all times" (in which respondents did not receive any lists or tips), Petliura was not mentioned (Hrushevsky came in sixth place in this poll). In the 2008 TV project Velyki Ukraïntsi ("Greatest Ukrainians"), he placed 26th.

In June 2009, Kyiv City Council renamed Comintern Street (located in Shevchenkivskyi District) as Symon Petliura Street to commemorate the 130th anniversary of his birth.

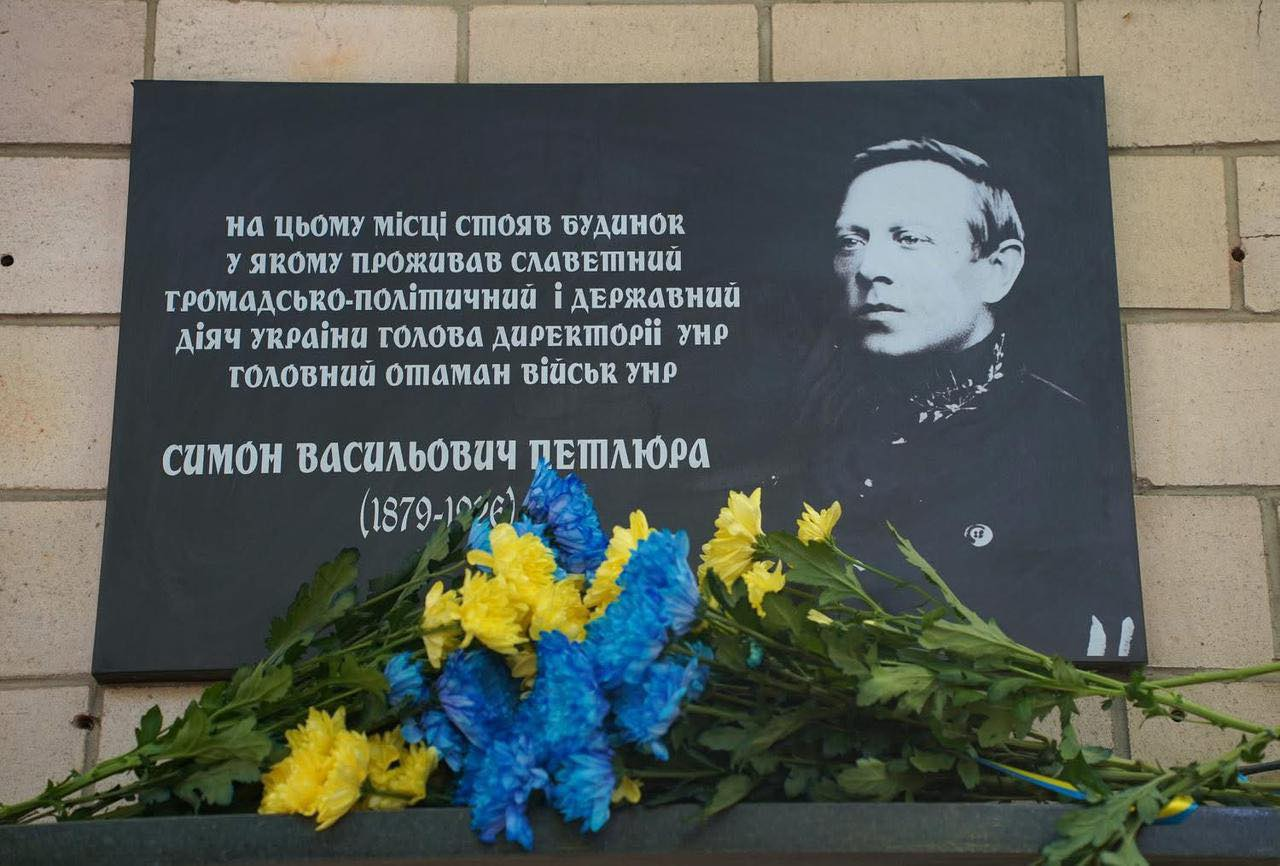
Plaque in remembrance of Petliura by the 152nd Brigade

On 14 October 2017, Defenders Day of Ukraine, a statue commemorating Symon Petliura installed by local municipal authorities was unveiled in Vinnytsia, which had briefly served as the de facto capital of the Ukrainian People's Republic during Petliura's tenure in May–June 1920. The placement of the statue in the historical district of Yerusalymka, formerly known as the city's Jewish quarter, caused criticism from some members of the Jewish community, including the World Jewish Congress.

In November 2017 a tryzub modelled after the one worn by Petliura during his leadership in the Directory was introduced as the standard ensign of the Armed Forces of Ukraine on the order of Ukraine's defence minister Stepan Poltorak.

In 2021 the project of a monument to Petliura was presented in his native city of Poltava.

In December 2022, the city of Izium – recently liberated from Russian forces – decided to rename Maxim Gorky Street as Symon Petliura Street.

On 6 December 2025 President Volodymyr Zelenskyy awarded the 152nd Jaeger Brigade the honorary name "Symon Petliura".

=== Attitudes in the Ukrainian diaspora ===
For part of the Western Ukrainian diaspora, Petliura is remembered as a national hero, a fighter for Ukrainian independence, a martyr, who inspired hundreds of thousands to fight for an independent Ukrainian state. He has inspired original music, and youth organizations.

== See also ==
- List of national leaders of Ukraine
- Ukrainian Civil War
- Anton Denikin

== Bibliography ==
- Danylevskyi/Danylevsky, Rev. Prof. K. (1947). Petliura v sertsiakh i pisniakh svoho narodu. Regensburg: Nakladom filii Tovarystva ukrayinskykh politychnykh v’iazniv v Regensburzi. P. 11.
- Danylevskyi/Danylevsky, Rev. Prof. K. O. (1951). Petliura v sertsiakh i pisniakh svoho narodu. Pittsburgh, USA: Vidbytka z Narodnoho Slova. P. 24.
- Encyclopedia of Ukraine – Paris-New York 1970, Volume 6, pp. 2029–30.
- Friedman, Saul S. (1976). Pogromchik: The Assassination of Simon Petlura. New York: Hart Publishing. ISBN 0805511628.
- Schwartzbard, Sholom: Over The Years (Inem Loif Fun Yoren). Excerpt from a book by Petliura's assassin explaining his actions.
- Strauss, Herbert A., ed. (1993). Hostages of modernization: studies on modern antisemitism, 1870-1933/39. Vol. 2. Berlin: W. de Gruyter. ISBN 3110137151.

Preceded by position created	Secretary of Military Affairs; June 1917 – January 1918	Succeeded by Mykola Porsh
Preceded by position created	Chief of General Bulava; Chief Otaman; Nov. 1918 – May 1926	Succeeded by Andriy Livytskyi
