= Sholem Schwarzbard =

Russo-French anarchist poet and assassin (1886–1938)

- שלום שװאַרצבאָרד
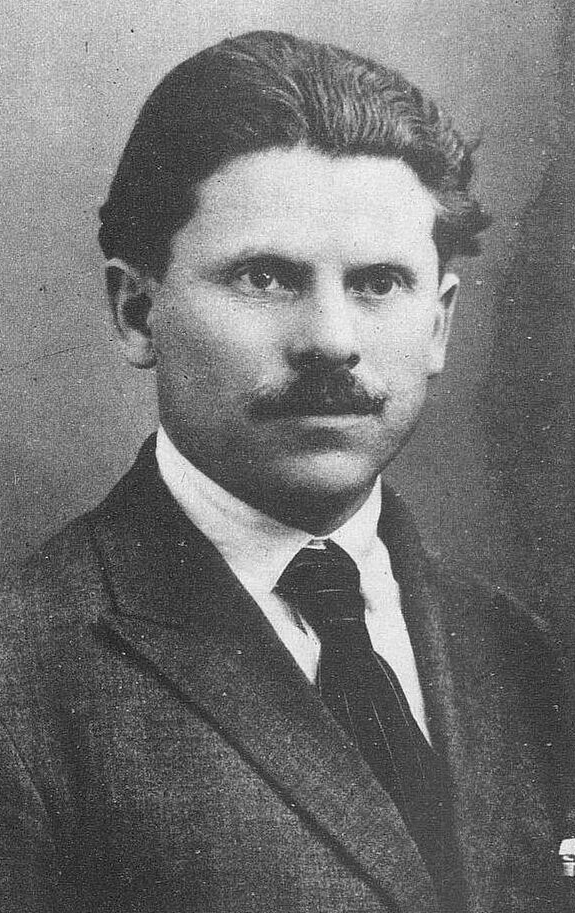
- Schwarzbard c. 1926
- Born: Shulem Itskovich Shvartsburd; 18 August 1886; Izmail, Bessarabia, Russian Empire (now Ukraine)
- Died: 3 March 1938 (aged 51); Cape Town, South Africa
- Resting place: 32°21′1.44″N 34°52′19.56″E
- Other name: Samuel Schwarzbard
- Known for: Schwartzbard trial
- Movement: Anarchism
- Criminal charge: Assassination of Symon Petliura
- Criminal status: Acquitted
- Spouse: Anna Render
- Parent(s): Isaak Shvartsburd (father); Khaye Vaysberger (mother)
- Military career
- Allegiance: French Republic; Russian SFSR; Ukrainian SSR
- Service: French Army; Red Guards; Red Army
- Service years: 1914–1919
- Units: French Foreign Legion; 363rd Infantry Regiment (France); Petrograd Red Guards; Cavalry group of Tiraspol squad International brigade (Red Army, 1919)
- Conflicts: World War I; Second Battle of Artois; Battle of the Somme; Russian Civil War; Romanian military intervention in Bessarabia; Bender Uprising; Ukrainian–Soviet War; Capture of Kiev
- Awards: Croix de guerre (1917)

Samuel "Sholem" Schwarzbard (Russian: Самуил Исаакович Шварцбурд, romanized: Samuil Isaakovich Shvartsburd; Yiddish: שלום שװאַרצבאָרד; French: Samuel 'Sholem' Schwarzbard; 18 August 1886 – 3 March 1938) was a Bessarabian-born Russian-French Yiddish poet. He served in the French and Soviet military, was a communist and anarchist, and is known for organising Jewish community defense against pogroms in the pre-First World War era and the Russian Civil War era in Ukraine, and for the assassination of Ukrainian nationalist leader Symon Petliura in 1926. He wrote poetry in Yiddish under the pen name of Baal-Khaloymes (English: The Dreamer).

== Early life ==
Schwarzbard was born in 1886 in Izmail, Bessarabia Governorate, Russian Empire to the Jewish family of Itskhok Shvartsbard and Khaye Vaysberger. His real given name was Sholem. After the proclamation of an order by the Russian Imperial government for all Jews to move out from the region within 50 versts (53 kilometres) of the border, his family moved to the town of Balta, in the southern Podolia region, where he grew up. His three older brothers died as children and his mother died whilst he was a child. In 1900, at an early age of 14 he became an apprentice to a watchmaker, Israel Dik.

During his apprenticeship in 1903, he became interested in socialism and began agitating for a revolutionary group called "Iskra", likely related to Vladimir Lenin's journal of the same name. At the time of the first Russian Revolution in 1905, he was based in Kruti, 50 kilometres (30 mi) north of Balta, where he was employed, in his own words, "fixing Cossack watches". A short time after participating in Jewish-run and -manned paramilitary activity while visiting his father in Balta, he was arrested and served a short stint in Proskurov and Balta prisons. He was released with the general amnesty granted as part of post-revolutionary tsarist "leniency". Fearing further arrests, Schwarzbard fled across the border into the Kingdom of Romania, and then to the Austria-Hungary, where he lived and worked in a number of cities and towns, including the capitals, Vienna and Budapest. There, he was converted to anarchism, especially the teachings of Peter Kropotkin, to which he would remain loyal the rest of his life.

== France (1910–1917) ==
In January 1910, at age 23, Schwarzbard settled in Paris and found work with a series of watchmakers.

=== First World War and injury ===
The day before enlisting, he married his girlfriend of three years, Anna Render, a fellow immigrant from Odessa. On 24 August 1914, Schwarzbard and his brother enlisted in the French Foreign Legion. As a legionnaire, he was sent to the front in November 1914 and participated in the Second Battle of Artois, near Arras, in May 1915. On account of his excellent military record, in early 1915, he was moved to the regular French 363rd régiment d’infanterie and transferred south to the Vosges Forest. While there, he was shot through the left lung, fracturing his scapula and tearing his brachial plexus. The doctors gave him little hope of surviving the wound, but he slowly improved over the next year and a half until he was in good enough shape to return to Russia. His left arm was left virtually useless, and he was awarded the Croix de guerre for his courage in the World War.

== Russian Revolution (1917–1919) ==
Schwarzbard was demobilized in August 1917 and in September, traveled with his wife to the Russian Republic, established after the February Revolution. On the French boat Melbourne, he was arrested for communist agitation and was handed over to Russian authorities in Arkhangelsk. He later traveled to Petrograd, where he joined and served in the politically mixed Red Guards (1917–1920). Schwarzbard commanded a unit of 90 sabers in the brigade of Grigory Kotovsky. He participated in the Bolshevik resistance against the Romanian military intervention in Bessarabia, as well as in the Bender Uprising. He then served in a Cheka battalion in Ukraine.

During the occupation and in the chaos that ensued after the Germans left, Schwarzbard lay low, survived a serious bout of typhus and worked securing facilities and supplies for the newly forming Soviet school system. He had himself tried to establish independent anarchist schools, but was willing to work with the Bolsheviks as they increasingly centralized the school system. Hearing news of countless pogroms, Schwarzbard tried to volunteer as a Red Guard soldier. After many delays, he was finally accepted into an "International Brigade" in June 1919 and began his second revolutionary campaign. The next two months were perhaps the worst of his life. His unit suffered defeat from the combined forces of Petliura and Denikin, who were uneasy allies at the time. Schwarzbard was in Kiev when both the Ukrainian and White Armies entered the city, his unit having been wiped out and disbanded. It was in this period, July–August 1919 that Schwarzbard witnessed first-hand the ruins and human devastation left by pogrom violence—images that would haunt him for the rest of his life. He again managed to take a train back to Odessa, where he was betrayed by a fellow anarchist to the White forces in control of the city. Before they could catch him, he learned that as a former French soldier, he was entitled to a passage to France. In late December 1919 he boarded the Nicholas I and sailed to Marseille via Istanbul, Beirut, and Port Said. He was back in Paris by 21 January 1920.

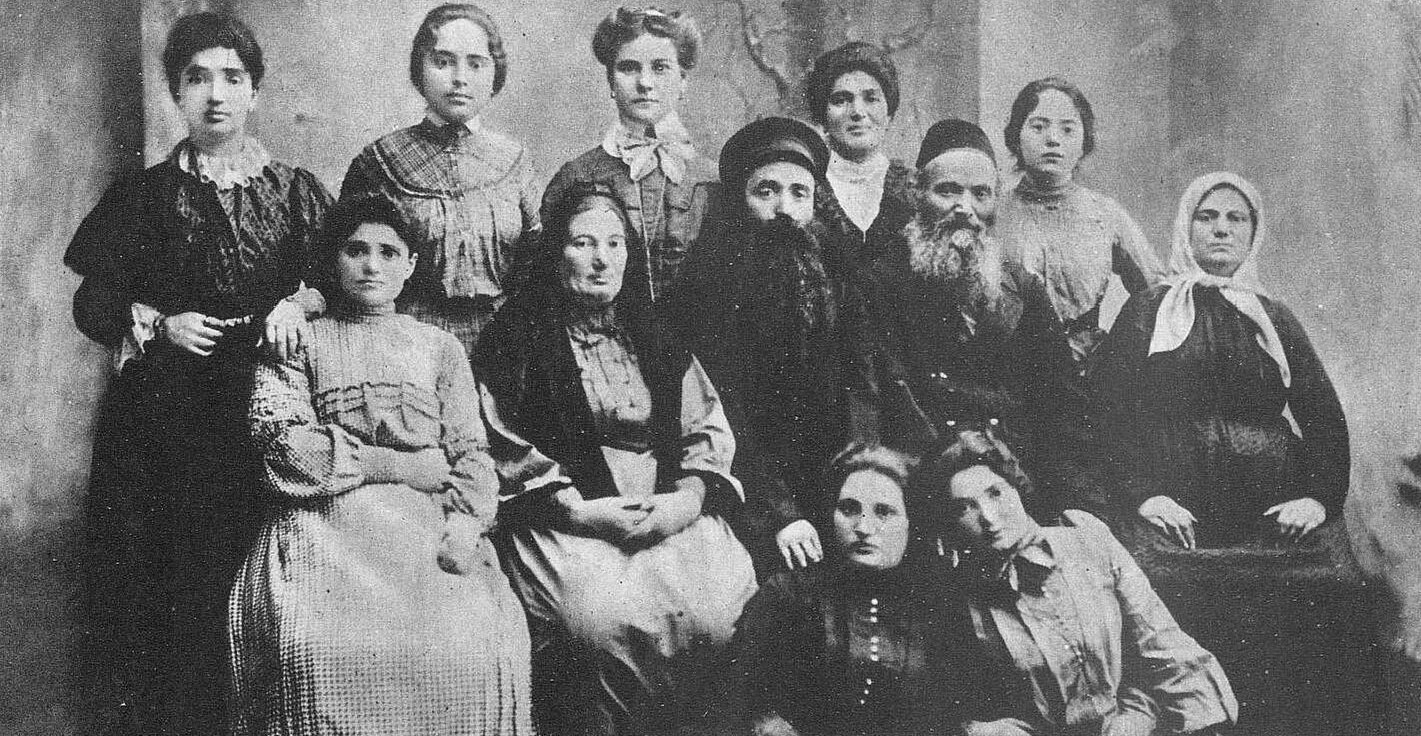
Schwarzbard's family, most of whom were killed in pogroms during the Russian Civil War.

In the turmoil that transpired in the period of the Russian Civil War, fourteen members of his family perished in antisemitic pogroms, including his most beloved uncle, who was killed in Ananiv. The names of all fourteen were listed for his trial in 1926 and can be found in the YIVO Schwarzbard Archive.

== Return to France (1920–1927) ==
In 1920, disillusioned with the outcome of the revolution, Schwarzbard moved back to Paris where he opened a clock-and-watch repair shop. There he was active in the French labor movement as an anarchist, and in 1925 became a French citizen. He was acquainted with prominent anarchist activists who had emigrated from Russia and Ukraine, including such figures as Volin, Alexander Berkman, Emma Goldman, as well as Nestor Makhno and his follower Peter Arshinov. In Paris Schwarzbard also became a member of the "Union of Ukrainian citizens". He contributed a number of articles to New York's anarchist daily Freie Arbeiter Stimme under the pseudonym "Sholem"—his first name, but also Yiddish for "peace", a fact he was quite proud of as an avid fan of Count Tolstoy.

=== Assassination of Petliura (1926) ===
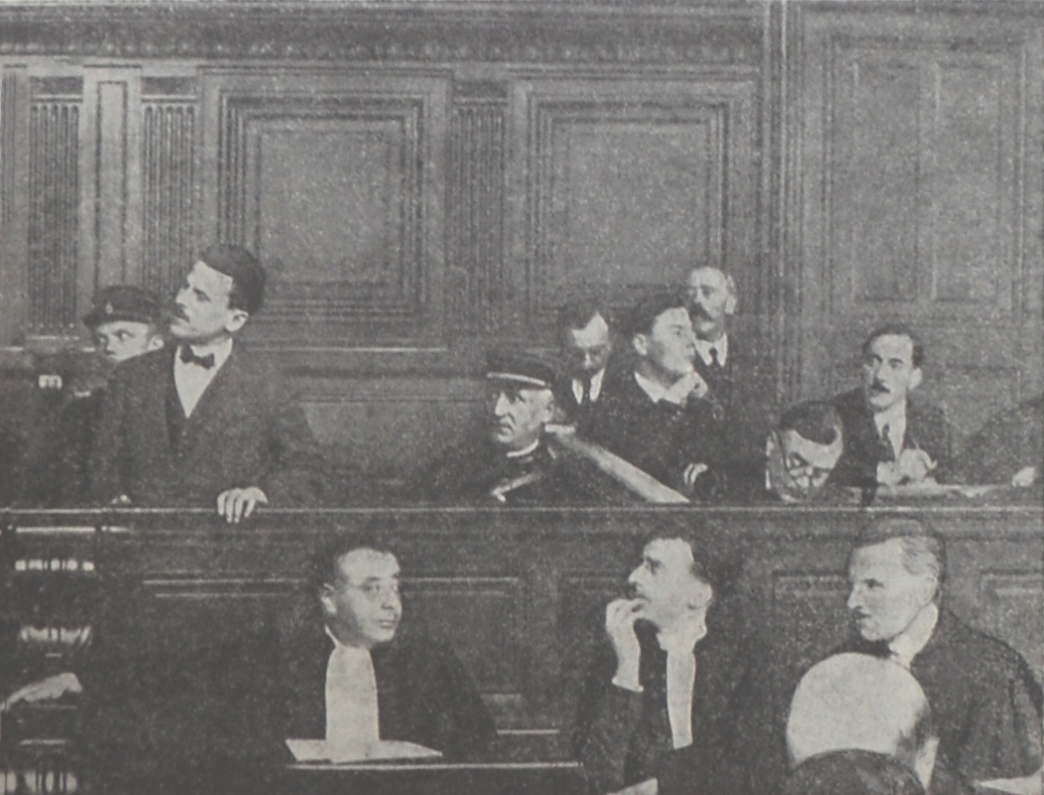
Schwarzbard gives a speech in the court, October 1927. Below him, Henri Torres, his attorney.

Symon Petliura, who was head of the Directorate of the Ukrainian Democratic Republic in 1919, had moved to Paris in 1924 and was the head of the government-in-exile of the Ukrainian People's Republic. Schwarzbard, who had lost his family in the 1919 pogroms, held Petliura responsible for them (see the discussion on Petliura's role in the pogroms). According to his autobiography, after hearing the news that Petliura had relocated to Paris, Schwarzbard became distraught and started plotting Petliura's assassination. Schwarzbard recognized Petliura from a picture. In 2006, Russian intelligence specialists stated, in a series of volumes on the Soviet secret services, that Schwarzbard worked as an agent of the Joint State Political Directorate (OGPU) at the time of Petliura’s assassination, and speculated that he may have been carrying out orders for the regime which benefitted from Petliura's death.

On 25 May 1926, at 14:12, by the Gibert bookstore, he approached Petliura, who was walking on Rue Racine near Boulevard Saint-Michel of the Latin Quarter, Paris, and asked him in Ukrainian, "Are you Mr. Petliura?" Petliura did not answer but raised his cane. Schwarzbard immediately pulled out a gun and shot him five times. After Petliura fell to the pavement, he shot him twice more. When the police came and asked if he had done the deed, he reportedly said, "I have killed a great assassin." Other sources state that he attempted to fire an eighth shot into Petliura, but his firearm jammed.

=== Schwarzbard trial (1927) ===
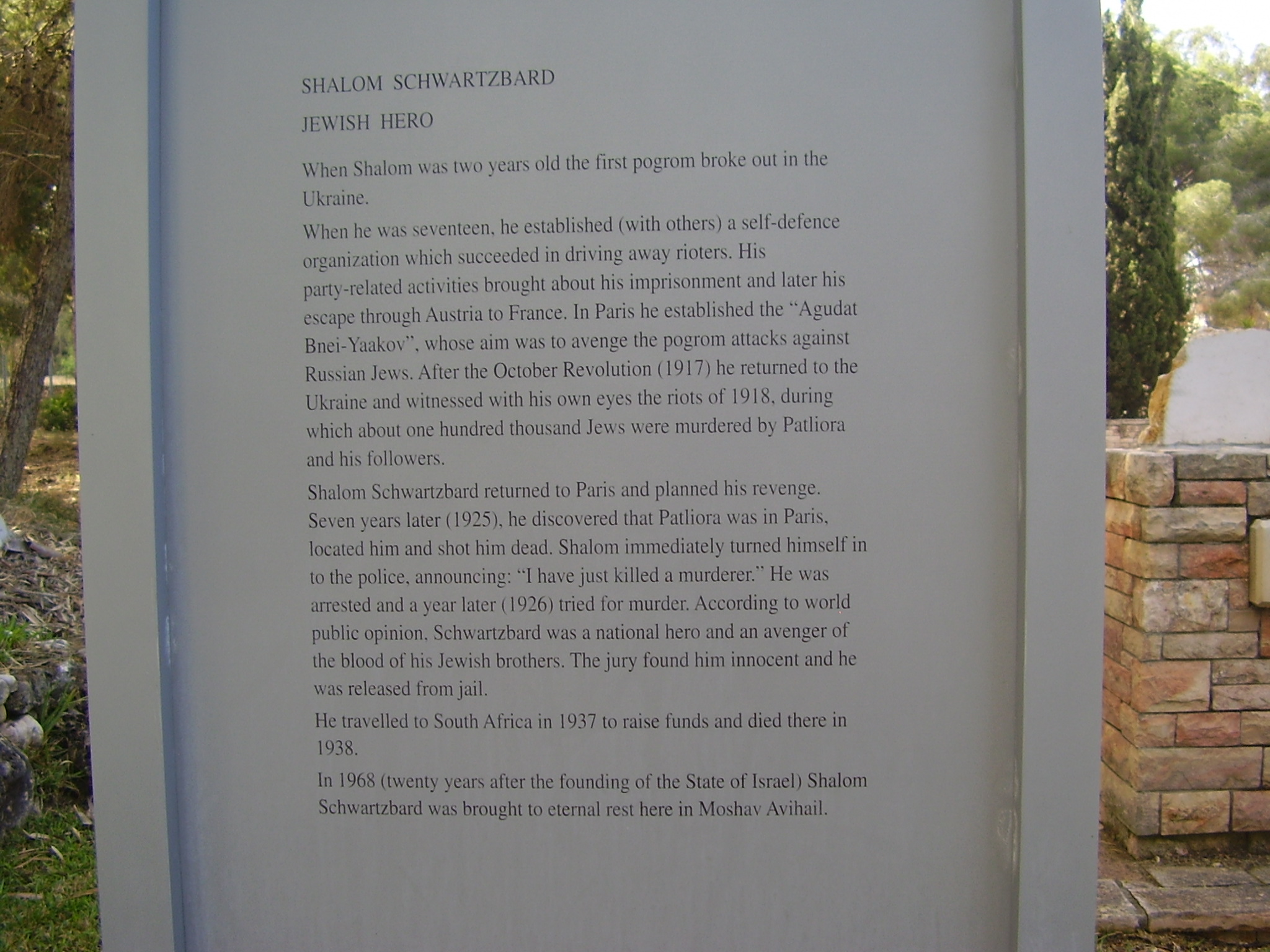
Memorial plate near Shalom Schwarzbard plate in Avihayil Cemetery

Schwarzbard was arrested and was put on trial by the Public Court Committee on 18 October 1927. His defense was led by Henry Torrès, a renowned French jurist who had previously defended anarchists such as Buenaventura Durruti and Ernesto Bonomini and who also represented the Soviet consulate in France.

The core of Schwarzbard's defense was to attempt to show that he was avenging the deaths of victims of pogroms, whereas the prosecution (both criminal and civil) tried to show that Petliura was not responsible for the pogroms and that Schwarzbard was a Soviet agent.

Both sides brought on many witnesses, including several historians. A notable witness for the defence was Haia Greenberg (aged 29), a local nurse who survived the pogroms in Proskurov (now renamed Khmelnytskyi, Ukraine) and testified about the carnage. She never said that Petliura personally participated in the event, but rather some other soldiers who said that they were directed by Petliura. Several former Ukrainian officers testified for the prosecution, including a Red Cross representative who witnessed Semesenko's report to Petliura.

After a trial lasting eight days the jury acquitted Schwarzbard. After his acquittal in 1928, Schwartzbard decided to immigrate to the British Mandate of Palestine. The British authorities, however, refused him a visa. In 1933, he travelled the United States where he re-enacted his role in the assassination on film. In 1937, Schwartzbard travelled to South Africa, where he died in Cape Town on 3 March 1938.In 1967, his remains were disinterred and transported to Israel, where he was reinterred.

== Writings ==
Schwarzbard is the author of numerous books in Yiddish published under the pseudonym "Bal Khaloymes" (master of dreams): Troymen un virklekhkeyt (Dreams and Reality, Paris, 1920), In krig mit zikh aleyn (At War with Myself, Chicago, 1933), Inem loyf fun yorn (Over the Year, Chicago, 1934).

Schwarzbard's papers are archived at YIVO Institute for Jewish Research in New York. They were rescued during World War II and smuggled from France by the historian Zosa Szajkowski.

== Bibliography ==
- Belling, V. (2009). "Isaac Ochberg and Sholem Schwartzbard: the Cape Town connection to the pogroms in the Ukraine". Jewish Affairs (64). ISSN 0021-6313. OCLC 5878570704.
- Friedman, Saul S. (1976). Pogromchik: The Assassination of Simon Petlura. New York: Hart Publishing. ISBN 0805511628. OCLC 2306425.
- Hunczak, Taras (1969). "A Reappraisal of Symon Petliura and Ukrainian-Jewish Relations, 1917-1921". Jewish Social Studies. 31 (3). Indiana University Press: 163–183. ISSN 0021-6704. JSTOR 4466501. OCLC 5792300209.
- Imonti, Felix (1994). Violent justice: how three assassins fought to free Europe's Jews. Amherst: Prometheus Books. ISBN 9780879759254. OCLC 31172303.
- Jacobs, Steven Leonard (2019). "The Complicated Cases of Soghomon Tehlirian and Sholem Schwartzbard and Their Influences on Raphaël Lemkin's Thinking About Genocide". Genocide Studies and Prevention. 13 (1): 33–41. doi:10.5038/1911-9933.13.1.1594. ISSN 1911-0359.
- Johnson, Kelly (2012). Sholem Schwarzbard: Biography of a Jewish Assassin (PhD). Harvard University.
- Schur, Anna (2007). "Shades of Justice: The Trial of Sholom Schwartzbard and Dovid Bergelson's Among Refugees". Law & Literature. 19. University of California Press: 15–43. doi:10.1525/lal.2007.19.1.15. ISSN 1535-685X. OCLC 360296795. S2CID 144348738.
- Szajkowski, Zosa (1969). ""A Reappraisal of Symon Petliura and Ukrainian-Jewish Relations, 1917-1921": A Rebuttal". Jewish Social Studies. 31 (3). Indiana University Press: 184–213. ISSN 0021-6704. JSTOR 4466502. OCLC 5547471975.
