= Schwartzbard trial =

1927 French murder trial

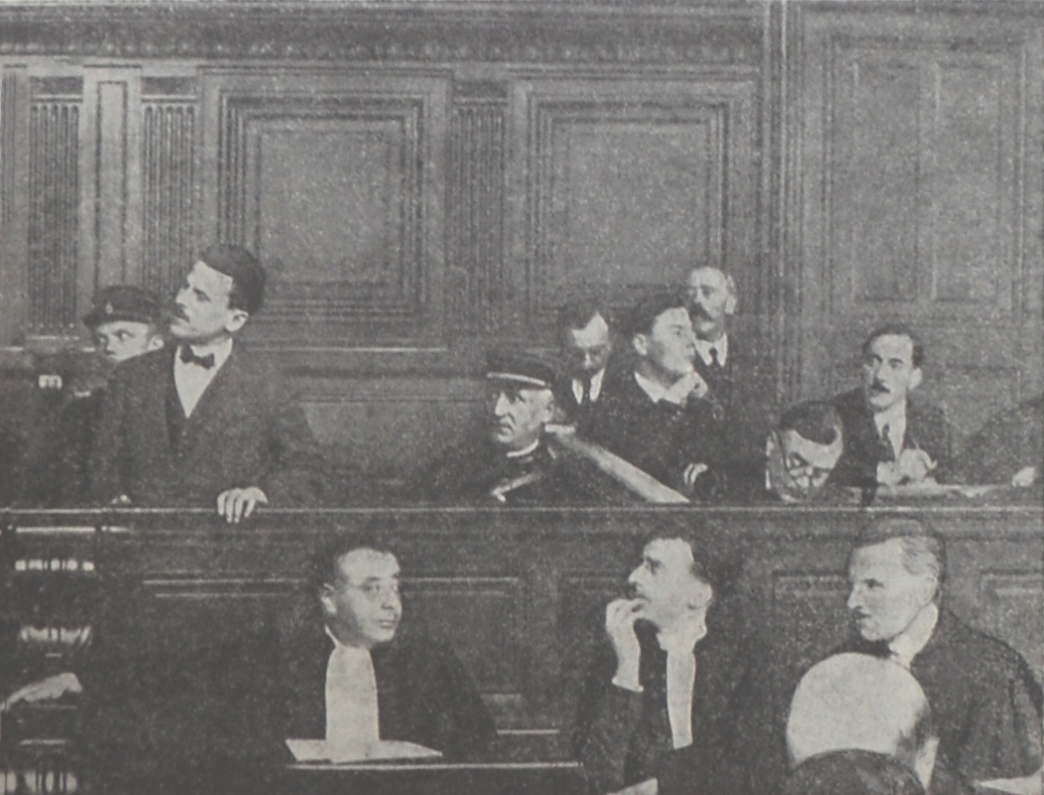
- Sholem Schwartzbard's speech the court. Below him, Henry Torrès, his attorney. Oct. 1927
- Native name: Процес Шварцбарда
- Date: October 18–26, 1927
- Location: Paris, France
- Type: Trial
- Cause: Assassination of Symon Petliura
- Motive: Revenge for antisemitic pogroms in Ukraine
- Casualties: Symon Petliura
- Accused: Sholem Schwarzbard
- Charges: Murder
- Verdict: Acquittal

The Schwartzbard trial was a sensational 1927 French murder trial in which Samuel "Sholem" Schwartzbard was accused of murdering the Ukrainian immigrant and head of the Ukrainian government-in-exile Symon Petliura. The trial quickly began to revolve around Petliura's responsibility for the 1919–1920 pogroms in Ukraine, during which Schwartzbard had lost all 15 members of his family. During the trial, prosecution alleged that Schwartzbard was a Soviet agent and assassinated Petliura on Soviet orders. This view is still widely held, especially in Ukraine, but is far from universal. Schwartzbard was acquitted of all charges.

== Assassination ==
In 1919, fighting in southern Ukraine as part of the Bolshevik Revolutionary Insurgent Army of Ukraine (RIAU), led by Grigori Kotovsky, Schwartzbard was told that he had lost 15 members of his family in pogroms that had taken place in Odesa, Ukraine that year. He held Symon Petliura, who was the head of the Directorate of the Ukrainian People's Republic, responsible for their deaths.

According to his autobiography, after hearing the news that Petliura had relocated to Paris in 1924, Schwartzbard became distraught and started plotting Petliura's assassination. A picture of Petliura with Józef Piłsudski was published in Encyclopédie Larousse and enabled Schwartzbard to recognize him.

On 25 May 1926, at 14:12, by the Gibert bookstore, he approached Petliura, who was walking on the Rue Racine near boulevard Saint-Michel in the Latin Quarter, Paris, and asked him in Ukrainian, "Are you Mr. Petliura?" Petliura did not answer but raised his cane. Schwartzbard pulled out a gun and shot him five times and, after Petliura fell to the pavement, shot him twice more. When the police came and asked if he had done the deed, he reportedly said, "I have killed a great assassin."

It is reported that he had planned to assassinate Petliura at a gathering of Ukrainian emigrants marking Petliura's birthday, but the attempt was foiled by the anarchist Nestor Makhno, who was also at the function. Schwartzbard had told Makhno that he was terminally sick, was about to die and would take Petliura with him. (Schwartzbard died eleven years after the trial.)

The French secret service had been monitoring Schwartzbard since his arrival in Paris, and noted his meetings with known Bolsheviks. During the trial, the German special services also alleged to their French counterparts that Schwartzbard had assassinated Petliura on the orders of an emissary of the Union of Ukrainian Citizens, an intermediary for Christian Rakovsky, an ethnic Bulgarian, a Soviet ambassador to France (1925–27), a former revolutionary leader from Romania, and a former prime minister of the Ukrainian SSR. The act was according to the prosecution consolidated by Mikhail Volodin, who arrived in France on 8 August 1925 and who had been in close contact with Schwartzbard.

== The trial ==
Schwartzbard turned himself in to a nearby gendarme and was arrested at the site of the assassination. Lawyers César Campinchi and Henry Torrès led the prosecution and the defense, respectively. After only 35 minutes of deliberation, the jury acquitted Schwartzbard.

=== The lawyers ===
For the defense, Henri Torres, grandson of Isaiah Levaillant, the man who founded the "League for the Defense of Human and Civil Rights" during the Dreyfus Affair. Torres was a renowned French left-wing jurist who had previously defended anarchists such as Buenaventura Durruti and Ernesto Bonomini and also represented the Soviet consulate in France.

For the prosecution there was the Public Court Commission that was preparing the claim. It was consisting of several Ukrainian statesmen such as Oleksander Shulhyn (former Minister of Foreign Affairs, at that time professor at the Ukrainian Free University), M. Shulhina, Vyacheslav Prokopovych, М. Shumytsky, І. Tokarzhevsky, and L. Chykalenko. The Commission gathered around 70 witness reports including L. Martyniuk, Lieutenant Colonel Butakov, M. Shadrin, Colonels Dekhtiarov and Zorenko, and many others. Explanation letters were sent by Generals Mykhailo Omelianovych-Pavlenko, Vsevolod Petrov and A. Cherniavsky.

The French people were represented by public prosecutor Reynaud. In the civil suit Madame Olga Petliura (nee Bilska) and her brother-in-law Oskar were represented by Albert Wilm and Cesare Campinchi (who was the chief prosecution lawyer). Assisting them was Czeslaw Poznansky, an attorney from Poland.

=== Schwartzbard ===
Schwartzbard was charged with violations of Articles 295, 296, 297, 298 and 302 of the French Penal Code (all of which pertained to premeditated murder and provided for the death penalty). The defendant pleaded not guilty to the charges.

Questioned by the prosecutor, Schwartzbard started his testimony poorly. He lied and gave confusing answers to why he had been previously imprisoned in Russia (1906), Vienna (1908) and Budapest (1909). He lied about his age, place of birth and the fact that he had been charged with burglary in Austria twice. He also lied about his service in the Red Army, stating that he fought on the side of Alexander Kerensky rather than have led a battalion under Kotovsky.

=== Witnesses ===
A notable witness for the defense was Haia Greenberg (aged 29) who survived the Proskuriv pogroms where she had worked as a nurse for the Danish Red Cross. She never said Petliura personally participated in the event, but named other soldiers, who said they were directed by Petliura. Torres, however, decided not to call on most of the other 80 witnesses he had prepared for Schwartzbard's defense. Instead, he took a calculated risk and delivered only a short speech, invoking the French Revolution.

I demand a full acquittal for my client. I demand it in the name of the French Revolution, in the name of our nation who died in the World War; in the name of humanity and of the prestige of France, at whom the whole world is looking. The French Revolution first gave emancipation to the Jewish people. The Jews have always been grateful to France. Don't darken those feelings. Not only the fate of Schwartzbard, but the prestige of France rests with you, gentlemen of the jury."

Torres later remarked that had Schwartzbard been found guilty, France would have lost all meaning:

"If I had not been heard, France would have been no longer France and Paris would have been no longer Paris."

== Outcome ==
The jury deliberated for only 35 minutes before acquitting Schwartzbard, whom they viewed as innocent "before God and their conscience." Following the verdict, someone in the courtroom chanted "Vive la France," and the entire courtroom started chanting. Not only was Schwartzbard acquitted, but Petliura's family was ordered to pay for the costs of the trial. The jury rewarded one franc in compensation to Petliura's widow and brother. Schwartzbard became seen by fellow Jews as a heroic avenger of the victims of the pogroms.

Time reported that the outcome of the trial gripped all Europe and was regarded by the Jews as establishing proof of the horrors perpetrated against their co-religionists in Ukraine under the dictatorship of Simon Petliura; radical opinion rejoiced, but the conservatives saw justice flouted and the decorum of the French courts immeasurably impaired.

== French press ==
The French press published detailed accounts and comments relating to the court proceedings. Divergent assessments of the assassination committed by Schwartzbard coincided with the political sympathies and antipathies of the particular newspapers, which fell into three groups:

1. Those that approved of Schwartzbard stressed the pogroms of the Jewish population and, from the very outset, treated the victim of the assassination as a defendant (the most conspicuous example being the communist newspaper L'Humanité)
2. Papers restricted themselves to an exact observation of the court trial but refused to print commentaries or did so very cautiously (Le Temps, L'Ere Nouvelle or Le Petit Parisien)
3. Papers portrayed Schwartzbard's crime in an unambiguously negative light and treated the assassin predominantly as a Bolshevik agent (also centrist publications but especially the right-wing L'Intransigeant, L'Écho de Paris and L'Action Française). The French governing circles, headed by Quai d'Orsay, were not interested in granting the case further publicity, which could cause the already-tense relations with the Soviet Union to deteriorate, which the latter threatened to sever.

== Aftermath ==
According to a defected KGB operative Peter Deriabin, the assassination of Petliura was a special operation by the GPU, and Schwartzbard was an NKVD agent and acted on the order from a former chairman of the Soviet Ukrainian government and then-Soviet Ambassador to France, Christian Rakovsky. Mykola Riabchuk wrote: "In fact, the trial turned into an ostentatious demonstration of retribution against Ukraine's demonized 'nationalism and separatism'; no Lubianka could ever have come up with anything better."

After the Schwartzbard trial, Henry Torrès was recognized as one of France's leading trial lawyers and remained active in political affairs.

After his acquittal in 1928, Schwartzbard decided to immigrate to the British Mandate of Palestine. The British authorities, however, refused him a visa. In 1933, he traveled the United States where he re-enacted his role in the murder on film. In 1937, Schwartzbard traveled to South Africa, where he died in Cape Town on 3 March 1938. In 1967, his remains were disinterred and transported to Israel, where he was reinterred.

== See also ==
- Soghomon Tehlirian, an Armenian who in 1921 assassinated the former Ottoman Grand Vizier and was acquitted on very similar grounds.

== Sources ==
- Friedman, Saul S. (1976). Pogromchik: The Assassination of Simon Petlura. New York: Hart Publishing. ISBN 0805511628.
- Encyclopedia of Ukraine
  - Vol 6, pp. 2029–30. Paris–New York 1970.
  - Vol. 3, 4. "Petliura, Symon", "Schwartzbard Trial", "Pogroms". Toronto: University of Toronto Press, 1993.
- Symon Petliura; et al. (2006). Симон Петлюра: Статті, листи, документи [Symon Petliura: Articles, Letters and Documents]. Vol. 4. Ukrainian Free Academy in the United States. p. 704. ISBN 966-2911-00-6.
- Dokument Sudovoyi Pomylky (Paris: Natsionalistychne Vydavnytstvo v Evropi, 1958); "L'Assassinat de l'Hetman Petlioura." OCLC 822228432
- "L'Assassinat de l"Hetman Petlioura", Le Figaro, May 26, May 27, June 3, 1926.
- Time magazine coverage
