= Henri Reichenbach =

French businessman (1891-1941)

Henri Reichenbach (born 29 January 1891 in Paris, died September 1941 in New York) was a French businessman who co-founded Prisunic in 1931. Forced to emigrate because of his Jewish heritage, he committed suicide after the Nazi invasion of France.

His wife, Jeanne Reichenbach, had a famous love affair with France's first Jewish prime minister, Léon Blum, joining Blum and becoming his wife in the Buchenwald concentration camp in 1943. A version of this story was fictionalized in a movie, Je ne rêve que de vous based on a book, Je vous promets de revenir, by Dominique Missika.

Reichnbach's father, Emile Reichenbach, was the vice president of the Comité France-Suisse.
