= Jeanne Blum =

Third wife of French politician Léon Blum (1899–1982)

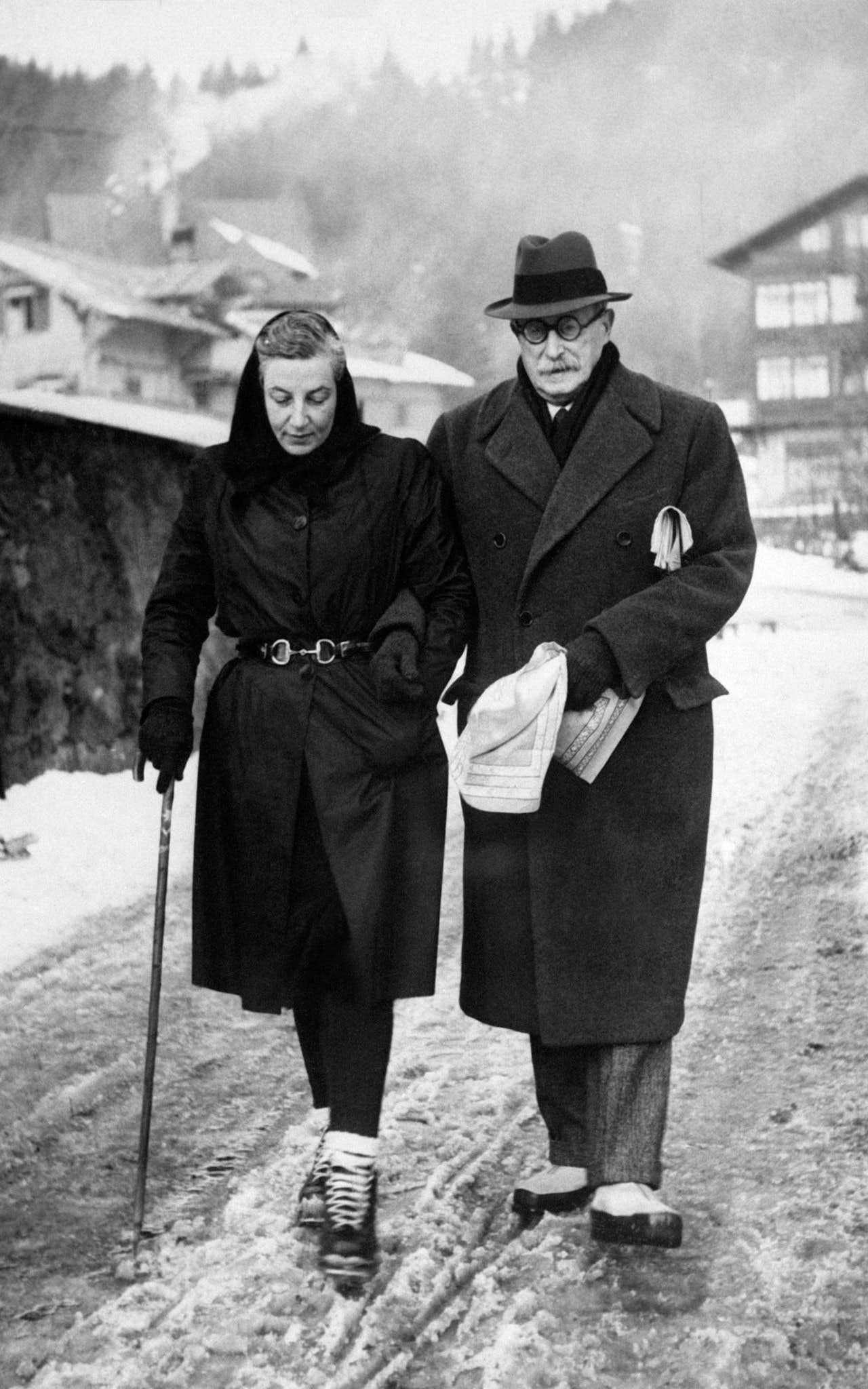
- Blum (left) in 1946
- Born: Jeanne Adèle Levylier; 11 February 1899; Paris, France
- Died: 3 July 1982 (aged 83); Jouy-en-Josas, France
- Spouses: Henry Torrès; Henri Reichenbach; Léon Blum
- Children: 2

Jeanne Adèle “Janot” Blum (11 February 1899 – 3 July 1982) was the third wife of Léon Blum, the French socialist politician and three times Prime Minister of France.

== Biography ==
Born Jeanne Adèle Levylier in Paris in 1899, her parents were from a Jewish family of high-rank civil servants. She became the stepdaughter of politician Charles Humbert when her mother remarried. In 1919, she married Henry Torrès, a lawyer, with whom she had two children, Jean and Georges Torres.

After a divorce, in 1933 she married industrialist Henri Reichenbach, one of the founders of the “Prisunic” retail store chain, but their marriage ended with his suicide in 1940.

She was a distant cousin of Léon Blum, and she was approached by him for a job in his office. She became his mistress, and after Blum's imprisonment during the war, the Vichy government authorised her to join him in Buchenwald in 1943 where, having favoured conditions of detention, they were allowed to be married. They had no children together.

She had purchased a small farm, Le Clos des Metz, in Jouy-en-Josas near Paris in 1938, and they settled there after the liberation of Paris. The house still has its office and library preserved just as Leon Blum had them. In 1974 she created in Jouy-en-Josas a special school named after her, the "École de puériculture Jeanne-Blum".

She died at home in 1982, from an overdose of medication, thirty-two years after the death of her husband.
