= Taras Hunczak =

American historian (1932–2024)

- Тарас Гунчак
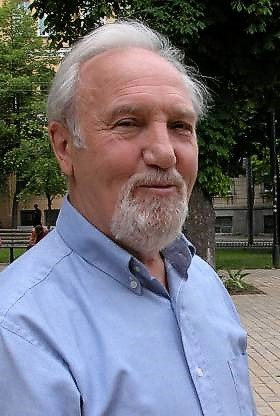
- Hunczak in 2012
- Born: March 13, 1932; Staremiasto, Poland (now Stare Misto, Ukraine)
- Died: July 1, 2024 (aged 92)
- Citizenship: American
- Occupations: Ukrainian, Russian, and East-European historian, specializing in 20th-century Ukrainian history
- Spouse: Olga Karpenko
- Awards: Ukraine Order of Merit (2008), Honorary doctorate (2013): the National University of Kyiv-Mohyla Academy

Academic background
- Education: Fordham University, B.A. (1955) and M.A. (1958); Vienna University, Ph.D. (1965)
- Influences: Oskar Halecki

Academic work
- Discipline: Eastern European history
- Sub-discipline: Ukrainian history
- Institutions: Rutgers University, National Taras Shevchenko University of Kyiv

Taras Hunczak (Ukrainian: Тарас Гунчак; March 12, 1932 – July 1, 2024) was a Ukrainian-American historian and political scientist, known for his Ukrainian, Russian and East-European scholarship. His research interests included the political history of Ukraine, Russia, and Poland in the 19th and 20th centuries.

Hunczak is best known for his extensive writing and archival research on 20th-century Ukrainian history, devoted to the history of the struggle for Ukrainian statehood, the development of Ukrainian political thought, repression and famine in Ukraine, as well as a well-known article reappraising the controversial Symon Petliura and Jewish-Ukrainian relations for the journal of Jewish Social Studies, and books on the Ukrainian War of Independence (1917–1921) and the contentious 1st Galician Division of the SS, among other topics.

He was recognized in 2008 with an Order of Merit by President Viktor Yushchenko: "For a significant personal contribution to strengthening the authority of Ukraine in the world, popularizing its historical and modern treasures, on the occasion of the 17th anniversary of Ukraine's Independence."

== Scholarship ==
In 1960, Hunczak began lecturing at Rutgers University where he also served as Director of the East European and Soviet Areas Studies Program, Chair of the History Department, and on the Rutgers University Senate between 1960 and 1984.

His scholarly work included writing, editing and archival work in Ukrainian, English and other languages, as well as taking on several editorial roles, including on a history of Russian imperialism, where he argued that the Russian colonizing empire "from the 16th century onward resembled the great colonizing empires of Portugal, Spain and Britain". Four centuries on, he describes Stalin and his followers as "buil[ding] their empire on 'the bones of millions of innocent victims'" during the Great Ukrainian Famine (Ukr: Holodomor).

In 1985, Hunczak also became editor in chief of Sučasnist (Eng: the Modernist), a "monthly journal of literature, translation, the arts, history, and political, social, and economic affairs, published from 1961 to 1990 by the Suchasnist Ukrainian Society for International Studies in Munich, with the assistance of the Prolog Research Corporation; then in 1990–1991 in Newark, New Jersey; and from 1991 to 2013 in Kyiv." In 1991, Hunczak also accepted a position as professor at the National Taras Shevchenko University of Kyiv.

After 44 years at Rutgers University, he retired in 2004. He was named Professor Emeritus, and inducted into the Rutgers Hall of Fame for his accomplishments the same year. He went on to serve as moderator for a United Nations discussion panel marking the 20th anniversary of the fall of the Berlin Wall in 2009, and he was the recipient of an honorary doctorate at the National University of Kyiv-Mohyla Academy in 2013.

== Memberships ==
Hunczak was a member of the National Academy of Sciences of Ukraine (NASU) and the Shevchenko Scientific Society in the U.S., a Ukrainian-American scholarly organization.

== Sports ==
In 1975, Hunczak established and coordinated the men’s volleyball program at Rutgers-Newark. Established as a club team, under his leadership shortly became a Division I Varsity Team. His team, which was described as "stacked with talented players of Ukrainian descent," won the East Coast Championship and placed second in the National Association of Intercollegiate Athletics (NAIA) National Championship in 1976, gaining both national and international recognition, and an invitation to play a tournament in the Netherlands. In 1977, Hunczak developed a successful Women’s Team, which also soon went varsity.

From 1978 to 1980, Hunczak, who coached and coordinated both teams, was the United States Volleyball Commissioner of the Garden-Empire Region in New York and New Jersey. He also served as the New Jersey vice-chairman of the National Junior Olympics of the Amateur Athletic Union (AAU).

== Publications ==
Hunczak's publications in English include:

- Russian Imperialism from Ivan the Great to the Revolution;
- The Ukraine, 1917-1921: A Study in Revolution;
- On the Horns of a Dilemma: The Story of the Ukrainian Division Halychyna;
- Symon Petliura and the Jews: A reappraisal (Ukrainian Jewish studies);
- Ukraine: The Challenges of World War II

Hunczak's publications in Ukrainian include:

- Ukraina—persha polovyna XX stolittia: Narysy politychnoi istorii;
- Symon Petliura ta ievrei;
- U mundyrakh voroha

== Education ==
Hunczak earned his B.A. and M.A. from New York's Fordham University in 1955 and 1958, respectively, where he worked with Polish historian Oskar Halecki. In 1965, he completed his dissertation on The Ukraine under Hetman Pavlo Skoropadskyi, and earned a Ph.D. from Vienna University, where Halecki had also studied. In 2013, he also received an honorary doctorate from the National University of Kyiv-Mohyla Academy.

== Personal life ==
Born on March 13, 1932, in Staremiasto, near Tarnopol, Poland, now Ternopil Oblast, Ukraine, Hunczak emigrated to the United States in 1949. In 2014, his nephew Mark Gregory Paslawsky, a West Point graduate, died in Ilovaisk, eastern Ukraine, while fighting with the Donbas Battalion against pro-Russian separatists.

Hunczak lived in retirement with his wife, Olga Hunczak. He died on July 1, 2024, at the age of 92.
