= Henry Torrès =

French lawyer and politician (1891–1966)

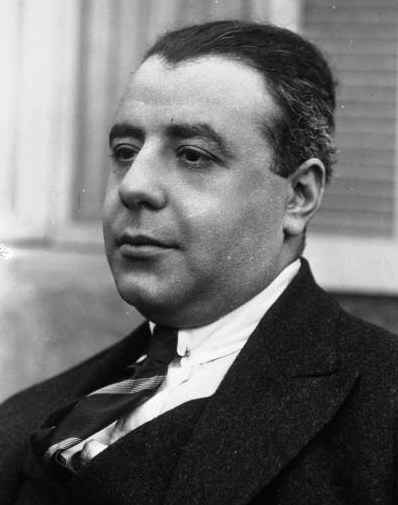

Senator for Seine
- In office 7 November 1948 – 8 June 1958

Member of the Chamber of Deputies for Alpes-Maritimes
- In office 1 May 1932 – 31 May 1936

Personal details
- Born: 17 October 1891 Les Andelys, Normandy, France
- Died: 4 January 1966 (aged 74) Paris, France
- Party: SFIO; PCF; RPF; RS
- Spouse: Jeanne Blum

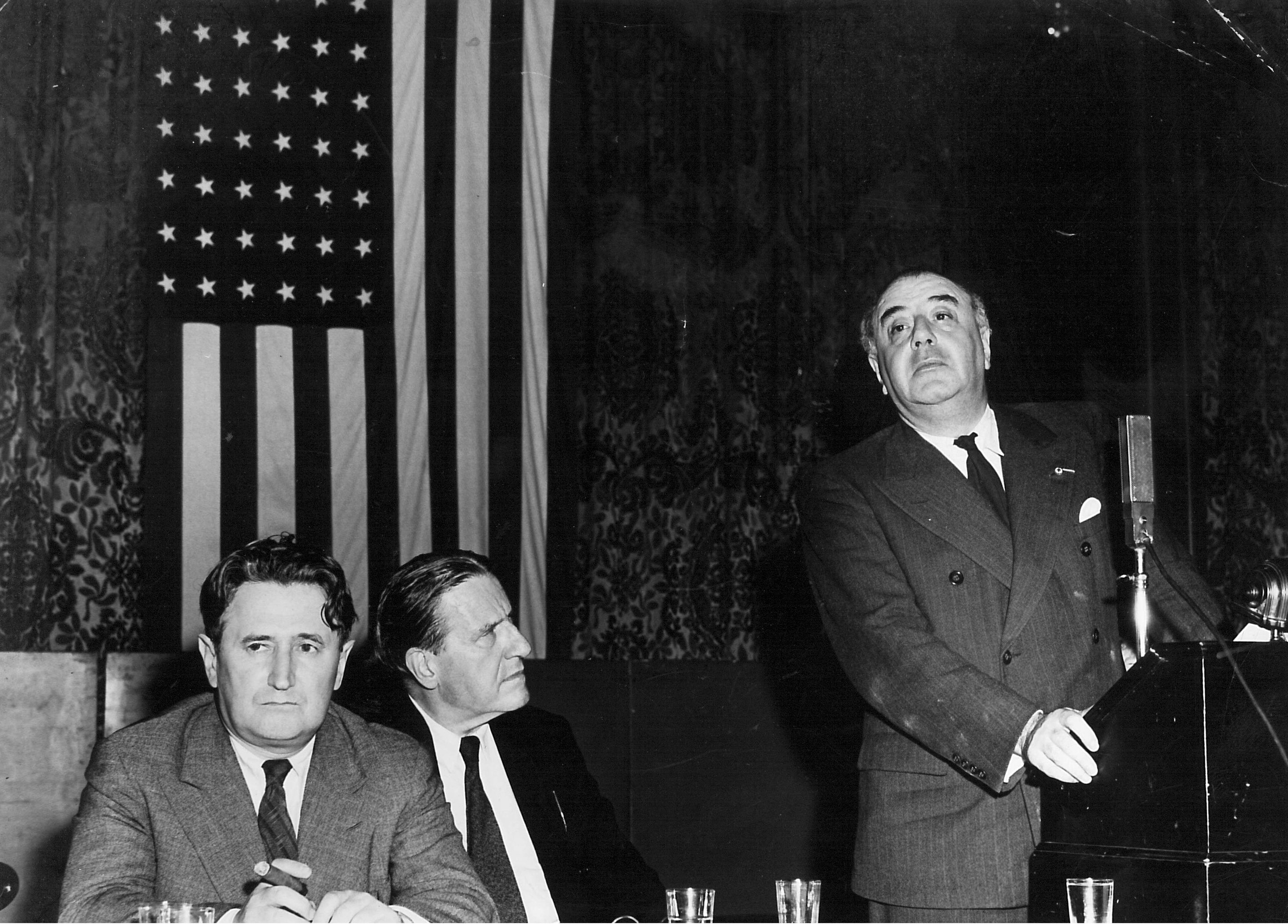
Nahum Goldmann, Stephen Samuel Wise, and Torres (speaking) at World Jewish Congress conference in New York, June 1942

Henry Torrès (17 October 1891 – 4 January 1966) was a French trial lawyer and politician, and a prolific writer on political and legal matters. A left-wing politician and a member of the French Communist Party before World War II, he was a Gaullist in the Post-War period.

== Family ==
Henry Torrès was born in Les Andelys in 1891 to a Jewish family. His grandfather, Isaiah Levaillant, founded the League for the Defense of Human and Civil Rights during the Dreyfus Affair. He married Jeanne Levylier, with whom he had two children Jean and Georges, but they divorced.

== Career ==
As a young man, Torrès became an active Socialist, then Communist and worked as a journalist for various left-wing publications. During the First World War, he served as an infantry sergeant, was injured at Verdun and won several medals including the Croix de Guerre. After the war Torrès decided to study law and became a criminal lawyer. With Vincent de Moro-Giafferi and César Campinchi he was known as one of the "three Musketeers"—all brilliant young leaders of the Paris bar. In his early years Torrès had aspired to become a comedian, but his style was encumbered by a pronounced lisp. Nonetheless, in his later years he was famed for his booming voice and flamboyant personality.

Torrès was involved in several criminal trials, before the Schwartzbard trial, not only in Paris but in Moscow and in Rumania. Upon returning to Paris he initiated a protest campaign denouncing the barbaric treatment of Jews in Bessarabia. After the Schwartzbard trial he was recognized as one of France's leading trial lawyers and remained active in political affairs.

After the Nazi invasion of France, Torrès fled to South America, but was expelled first from Uruguay and then from Brazil because of his leftist associations. He moved on to Canada and then the United States. While in America, he campaigned against the Vichy regime and supported Charles de Gaulle. As a Jew, he had been banned from the French bar and because of his anti-government pamphlets and books he was sentenced to death in absentia by the Pétain regime.

Post-War, Torrès became a member of the Rally of the French People founded by de Gaulle and was elected a senator in 1948. He was reelected in 1952 and later joined the Social Republicans, the successor Gaullist party. He retired as a lawyer in 1956 and did not seek reelection as a senator in 1958.

Torrès was also a mentor for lawyer and future politician Robert Badinter.

== Writer ==
In New York City, Torrès was editor-in-chief of La Voix de France, a political journal for refugees and later as a professor of law at the Universities of Rio de Janeiro and São Paulo. After the war, he returned to his homeland and was reinstated into the French bar.

From 1948 to 1958 he was a Gaullist senator for the Seine department. He briefly qas Vice President of the High Court of Justice and did work in the national radio and television system, working as president of the state monopoly from 1948 to 1959.

Torrès was a prolific writer and wrote plays with a legal background including French translations of The Trial of Mary Dugan and Witness for the Prosecution. Torrès died at his Paris home in 1966. He was 75.
