= Zosa Szajkowski =

American historian (1911–1978)

Zosa Szajkowski (born Yehoshua or Shayke Frydman) (10 January 1911, Zaręby, Poland – 26 September 1978, New York) was an American historian born in the Russian Partition of Poland, whose work is important in Jewish historiography.

== Biography ==
Zosa Szajkowski was born on 10 January 1911, at Zaręby Kościelne (in Yiddish, Zaromb), a small town in Russian Partition, in the region of Białystok. He spent his childhood there, attending a traditional Jewish cheder, as well as a public Jewish elementary school; later he attended a public Jewish secondary school in Warsaw for three years.

In 1927, at the age of 16, Szajkowski moved to Paris, joining two brothers and a sister who were already living there. While supporting himself with various odd jobs, he pursued a career as a writer; by 1934 he was working as a journalist for Naye Prese, Paris's Yiddish-language communist daily.

An autodidact who had never studied at a university, Szajkowski aspired to write scholarly studies in Jewish history. Around 1935 he met Elias Tcherikower and his wife Riva, who were then residing in Paris, and became a regular visitor at their Paris apartment, a gathering place for Yiddish-speaking intellectuals. Over the course of time Tcherikower, who headed the historical section of YIVO, a scholarly Jewish research institute headquartered in Vilnius, became a mentor to Szajkowski in his scholarly endeavors. In 1936 and 1937, Szajkowski published at his own expense two books of his essays on historical topics, one about the history of the Yiddish-speaking immigrant community in France and the other about the history of the Jewish labor movement there.

In The New York Sun, William Meyers gives, in 2007, a portrait of Szajkowski:

When my wife began research 35 years ago for her book on the history of Yiddish theater, she spent long days at YIVO, the Institute for Jewish Research, at that time still located in the old Vanderbilt mansion at Fifth Avenue and 86th Street. Zosa Sjakowski was an entrenched presence there, a gnome-like man with a talent for instantly alienating almost everyone he came in contact with. But this diminutive bundle of spite had led an adventurous life. He left his native Poland in the 1920s to escape the escalating antisemitism; in Paris he joined the Communist Party and recruited other Eastern European Jews to fight for the Loyalists in the Spanish Civil War; when World War II began he joined the French Foreign Legion; discharged from the Legion after being injured he made his way to England and joined the American Army as an intelligence officer. On D-Day he was parachuted into Normandy behind the German lines; he was with the first wave of American troops to enter Berlin. ... Szajkowski changed his name [from Frydman to Szajkowski] when he realized that many of the countrymen he was recruiting to fight fascism in Spain were actually being killed not by the forces of General Franco, but by the communists who had taken over the direction of the Loyalists forces; to the Red political commissars, soldiers with different opinions were more of a threat than was Franco. Szajkowski quit the party, but was convinced the communists wanted to kill him, so he changed his name. The fear never left him, never.

Professor Jonathan Sarna from Brandeis University wrote in 2006 the following about Zosa Szajkowski:

The death of Rabbi Arthur Hertzberg this week called to mind a course I took as a Brandeis undergraduate with the legendary YIVO Institute for Jewish Research scholar, Zosa Szajkowski. Szajkowski's idea of teaching was to talk about whatever was on his mind that day, and for a good portion of the course what was on his mind was his ex-friend Rabbi Arthur Hertzberg. Just a few years before, Rabbi Hertzberg's brilliant book entitled The French Enlightenment and the Jews (1968) had appeared, and Szajkowski charged that much of Rabbi Hertzberg's research was cribbed from his articles. "I am going to sue him," he fumed. The charge was absurd. Szajkowski, an autodidact whose English was weak, could never have written the powerful thesis-driven book that Rabbi Hertzberg produced. But this did not prevent the two hard-headed ex-friends from having an acrimonious quarrel. Nevertheless, a few years later, when Szajkowski died suddenly, it was Rabbi Hertzberg who conducted his funeral and eulogized him. That was his way.

== Archive transfer ==
In an article published in 2001, in the Archives juives, on the topic of "La reconstruction de la bibliothèque de l'AIU (Alliance Israélite Universelle), 1945–1955 [The rebuilding of the Library of the AIU (Alliance Israélite Universelle), 1945–1955"], Jean-Claude Kuperminc writes:

Before concluding, there remains to mention a particular aspect of these moving operations of the collections of Jewish Libraries. After the Nazi spoliations, we had to be submitted to non pleasant events involving some American Jewish Institutions. The case of thefts perpetrated by the historian Zosa Szajkowski is now known. It can be specified that Szajkowski was caught stealing in the rooms of the Bibliothèque nationale et universitaire from (Strasbourg) and condemned for theft in 1963. During the years 1949–1950, Szajkowski, who also called himself Frydman, used the Library of the Alliance and important documents then disappeared. In May 1950, the "American Friends" of the AIU informed the Parisian headquarters that books belonging to the AIU had been sold by Szajkowski to the New York Public Library and to the Jewish Theological Seminary (JTS) of New York.

In an article on the history of the Synagogue of Fontainebleau, published in February 2010, Frédéric Viey writes in conclusion:

Proud of its past, the Jewish Community of Fontainebleau can commemorate in 2010 without any fuss its 230 years of existence since one can find a Jewish presence in that city even prior to 1780. Indeed, even if Zosa Sjajkowski has embezzled a certain number of documents from the Archives Nationales and that he establishes the date of the settling of Jews in Fontainebleau in August 1795, he wasn't able to consult all the documents concerning the Jewish Community, in particular the register of births, marriages and deaths of that city.

There is a mention of suspicion or of documented thefts by Zosa Szajkowski at the following locales:

- Library of the Alliance Israélite Universelle, in Paris, 1949–1950
- Bibliothèque nationale et universitaire (Strasbourg), 1963
- Archives Nationales, in Paris

== Works by Szajkowski ==
The list of publications by Szajkowski, chronologically, is as follows (some are out-of-print):

- 1942 How the mass migration to America began
- 1944 The decline and fall of Provençal Jewry
- 1946 The growth of the Jewish population of France
- 1947 Internal conflicts in French Jewry at the time of the revolution of 1848
- 1947 The organisation of the "UGIF" in Nazi-occupied France
- 1948 Dos loshn fun di Yidn in di arba' kehiles fun Komta-Venessen
- 1948 The language of the Jews in the four communities of Comtat Venaissin
- 1948 Socialists and radicals in the development of antisemitism in Algeria (1884–1900)
- 1948 Antisemitizm in der Frantseyzisher arbeter-bavegung
- 1951 Jewish emigration policy of the Rumanian "exodus", 1899–1903
- 1952 Emigration to America or reconstruction in Europe
- 1953 Agricultural credit and Napoleon's anti-Jewish decrees
- 1954 The economic status of the Jews in Alsace, Metz and Lorraine (1648–1789)
- 1954 Poverty and social welfare among French Jews (1800–1880)
- 1955 The Comtadin Jews and the annexation of the Papal province by France, 1789–1791
- 1955 Relations among Sephardim, Ashkenazim and Avignonese Jews in France: From the 16th to the 20th centuries
- 1956 The European aspect of the American-Russian passport question
- 1956 ha-Komunah ha-Parsa'it veha-Yehudim
- 1956 Jewish emigration from Bordeaux during the eighteenth and nineteenth centuries
- 1956 Protestants and Jews of France in fight for emancipation, 1789–1791
- 1957 French Jews in the Armed Forces during the revolution of 1789
- 1958 Glimpses on the history of Jews in occupied France
- 1958 The reform of the état-civil of the French Jews during the Revolution of 1789
- 1959 Autonomy and communal Jewish debts during the French Revolution of 1789
- 1959 The emancipation of Jews during the French Revolution: A bibliography of books, pamphlets and printed documents, 1789–1800
- 1959 Notes on the demography of the Sephardim in France
- 1960 Bibliography of Jewish periodicals in Belgium, 1841–1959
- 1960 Jewish diplomacy: Notes on the occasion of the centenary of the Alliance Israélite Universelle
- 1962 Catalogue of the exhibition, Morris Rosenfeld (1862–1923) and his time
- 1962 Franco-Judaica: An analytical Bibliography of Books, Pamphlets, Decrees, Briefs
- 1962 Mazarinades of Jewish interest
- 1966 Analytical Franco-Jewish gazetteer, 1939–1945, with an introd. to some problems in writing the history of the Jews in France during World War 2
- 1970 One hundred years of the Yiddish press in America, 1870–1970: Catalogue of the exhibition
- 1971 or 1972 Index of articles relative to Jewish history and literature published in periodicals from 1665 to 1900
- 1972 The attitude of American Jews to World War I, The Russian Revolution of 1917, and Communism (1914–1945)
- 1974 The impact of the 1919–1920 Red Scare in America
- 1975 Jews and the French Legion
- 1976 An Illustrated Sourcebook on the Holocaust
- 1977 Kolchak, Jews, and the American intervention in Northern Russia and Siberia, 1918–1920
- 1977 The mirage of American Jewish aid in Soviet Russia, 1917–1939
- 1980 An illustrated sourcebook of Russian antisemitism, 1881–1978

== Awards ==
- 1966: National Jewish Book Award in the Holocaust category for Analytical Franco-Jewish gazetteer, 1939–1945

== Archives of Zosa Szajkowski ==
The personal archives of Zosa Szajkowski are located at the Library of Columbia University, in the collection of rare books and manuscripts and the Zosa Szajkowski Collection at the YIVO, part of the Center for Jewish History.
