= Gibert Joseph =

Bookstore and record store chain in France

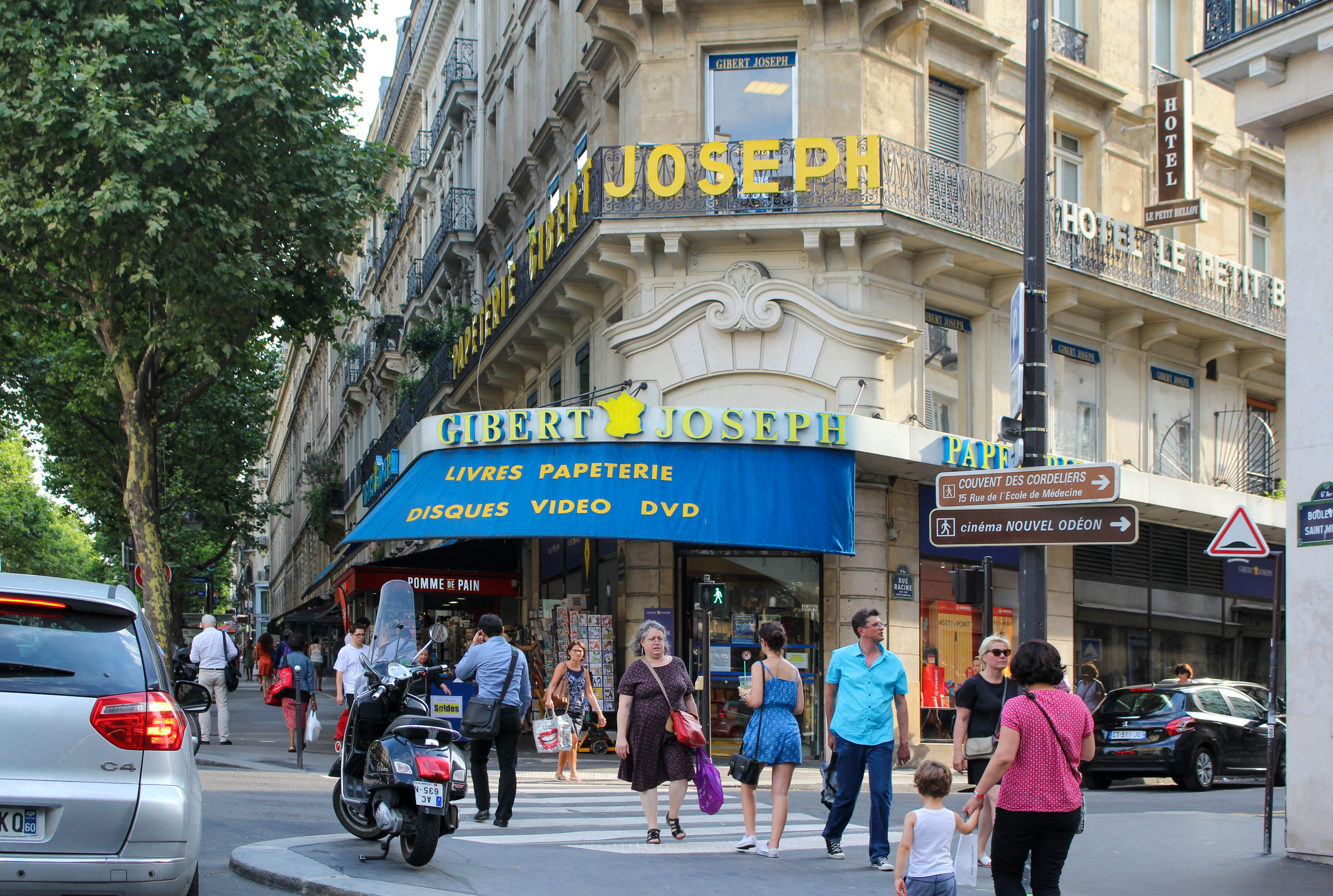
- Gibert Joseph branch, corner blvd. Saint-Michel and rue Racine, Paris
- Industry: Bookshop, Record shop
- Founded: 1888
- Founder: Joseph Gibert
- Number of locations: 28 (2023)
- Area served: France
- Website: gibert.com

Gibert Joseph is a chain of bookstores and record stores in France. With a number of its branches scattered along the Boulevard Saint-Michel, Paris, culminating in its flagship store featuring "six floors of crowded shelves", it was described in 2016 as being "the biggest bookstore in Paris".

== Company history ==
=== Early years ===
Joseph Gibert, the founder of this firm, began his career as a "professeur des Lettres Classiques (English, "teacher of classical literature") at the Saint-Michel College in Saint-Étienne, a city in eastern central France, before moving to Paris in 1886. Just opposite the Notre Dame Cathedral he began selling books from four bouqiniste boxes at the Quai Saint-Michel on the banks of the Seine. In 1888 he opened his first bookstore at 23 Boulevard Saint-Michel in the Latin Quarter of Paris. That bookstore specialised in the sale of secondhand school textbooks and thrived in part due to the French Prime Minister Jules Ferry having recently in 1882 made primary education in France free and compulsory. Gibert died in 1915 and his two sons succeeded him as the proprietors of the bookstore.

=== Separation (1929-2017) ===
In 1929 the two brothers decided to go their separate ways. Joseph Gibert, the elder son of the founder, opened his own bookstore, named Gibert Joseph, at 30 boulevard Saint-Michel, while Régis, the younger son, maintained the original bookshop on the Quai Saint-Michel, trading under the name Gibert Jeune.

Over the years the Gibert Joseph bookstore grew to a height of six floors and has also taken over 26, 30 and 34 boulevard St Michel, attracting students from the nearby Sorbonne. At the same time, the Gibert Joseph business developed a network of bookstores in the towns of the French provinces: in Lyon, Grenoble, Saint-Étienne, Clermont-Ferrand, Poitiers, Dijon, Toulouse, Montpellier and Marseille, as well as in various parts of the Paris away from the Latin Quarter.

The Gibert Jeune business, on the other hand, concentrated on Paris. In 1934 it moved to the right bank of the Seine and established a bookstore at 15 boulevard St Denis while in 1971 investing in the building at 5 place Saint-Michel.

From the 1950s both the Gibert Joseph and Gibert Jeune businesses diversified from selling just books (both new and secondhand) and selling records, music, videos, stationery, toys and other products as well. Beginning in 2002 the businesses set up websites for selling their wares online.

On 4 February 1986, a Gibert Jeune store was devastated by an explosion detonated by the CSPPA group, causing five to be wounded.

=== Reunification (2017) ===
In April 2017 the Gibert Joseph and Gibert Jeune firms entered into discussions for the takeover of Gibert Jeune, which was in financial difficulty, by Gibert Joseph. On 17 May 2017, the Paris Commercial Court recorded the takeover of Gibert Jeune by Gibert Joseph, thus ending 88 years of separation. Bruno Gibert, the chairman of the board of management of Gibert Jeune, announced that the merger would not lead to any loss of employment or sales outlet. The CGT union denounced the lack of transparency with which the merger discussions were held, deplored the lack of information provided to the employees of Gibert Jeune and Gibert Joseph, and voiced its concerns about the possible social consequences of this merger.

In November 2017, the Autorité de la concurrence, the French agency regulating competition, authorised the merger of Gibert Joseph and Gibert Jeune.

=== Impact of the 2020 health crisis ===
In 2020 during the COVID-19 pandemic a number of Gibert Joseph stores in the French provinces were forced to close. In Paris the premises of the Gibert Jeune bookstore located at 5 place Saint-Michel in Paris were sold by the Jeune family and a job protection plan was formalised on 4 December 2020. The historic bookstore located at 27 quai Saint-Michel was saved thanks to the intervention of the Paris City Hall, which bought the premises. The company's esoteric bookstore located opposite the Cathedral of the Notre Dame was also saved.

== Le Prix des libraires Gibert Joseph ==
In 2014, the company began awarding an annual literary prize, named Le Prix des libraires Gibert Joseph. The first winner was Gauz for his novel Debout-Payé.
