= Dmytro Vitovsky =

Ukrainian politician and colonel

- Дмитро Вітовський
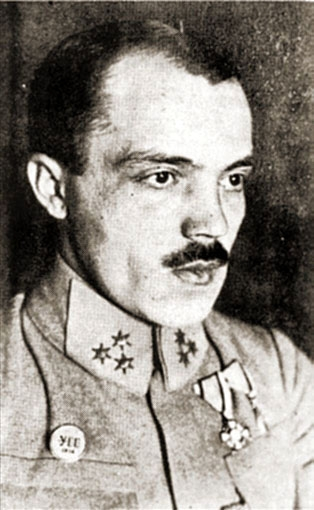

State Secretary of Armed Forces of West Ukraine
- In office 9 November 1918 – 13 February 1919
- Prime Minister: Kost Levytsky; Sydir Holubovych
- Preceded by: Office established
- Succeeded by: Viktor Kurmanovych

Personal details
- Born: 8 November 1887 Medukha, Stanislau powiat, Galicia and Lodomeria, Austria-Hungary
- Died: 4 August 1919 (aged 31) Rauden, Bezirk Oppeln, Silesia, Germany
- Education: Lviv University

Military service
- Allegiance: Austria-Hungary (1914–1918), West Ukrainian National Republic (1918–1919)
- Branch/service: Ukrainian Galician Army
- Years of service: 1914–1919
- Rank: Captain; Colonel (1 January 1919)
- Commands: Ukrainian Sich Riflemen; Ukrainian Galician Army
- Battles/wars: World War I; Polish–Ukrainian War

Dmytro Dmytrovych Vitovsky (Ukrainian: Дмитро Дмитрович Вітовський; 8 November 1887 – 4 August 1919) was a Ukrainian politician and military leader.

Vitovsky was born into a family of gentry in the village of Medukha in Galicia (today in Ivano-Frankivsk Raion). He graduated from the Stanislau gymnasium and later was a student activist at the law school of Lviv University. Later Vitovsky joined the Ukrainian Radical Party and was an active organizer of a number of Ukrainian educational and scouting Sich groups near Stanislau, which later became part of the regular Galician Army.

Vitovsky started his active military career in 1914 participating in mountain battles in the Carpathians, and was an ideologist of Ukrainian military political thought. In 1916–1917 he was a Ukrainian military commissar in Volhynia, and organized Ukrainian schools there. Vitovsky also was co-founder of the Striletsky Found, and published the official newspaper of the Ukrainian Sich Riflemen, Shliakhy ('The Pathways'). He became a company commander of the Legion of Sich Riflemen and carried out special assignments (guerrilla warfare). When in 1915, after Austro-Hungarian forces reconquered the city of Halych, "out of patriotic feelings" as he said himself, Vitovsky hung the Ukrainian flag on top of the Halych town hall, which created a conflict between him and his Austro-Hungarian military superiors. Towards the end of World War I Vitovsky was appointed the chairman of Ukrainian Military Committee that organized the November Uprising in Lemberg. He became the first commander of the Ukrainian Galician Army (1–5 November 1918).

A week later after being commissioned as the first commander of the Galician Army Vitovsky was appointed as the State Secretary of Armed Forces in Levytsky's government. On 1 January 1919 he was promoted from major to colonel. As a deputy of the Ukrainian National Rada (February–April 1919), Vitovsky was chosen to attend the Paris Peace Conference as a member of the Western Ukrainian delegation in May 1919. Vitovsky was killed in an aircraft crash during the flight from Paris to Kamyanets-Podilsky on 4 August 1919 and was buried in Berlin.

On 1 November 2002, the remains of Dmytro Vitovsky were reburied at the Lviv Lychakiv Cemetery on the initiative of Yuriy Ferentsevych.

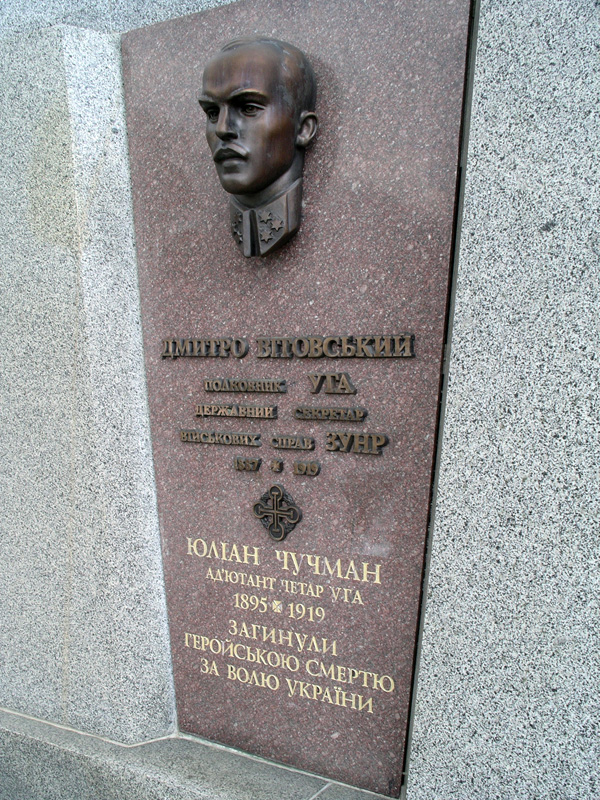
Tomb of Dmytro Vitovsky at the Lychakiv Cemetery in Lviv.

== Personal life ==
Shortly after being wounded in battle in 1916, Vitovsky married Maria Lishchynska. Their son, also named Dmytro, would become a member of the Ukrainian Insurgent Army.

== Sources ==
- Lviv Study. Handbook. / Compiler group manager N.Vynnytska.- Lviv: AHIL, 2003.- 52 p. ISBN 966-7617-59-9
