= Viktor Kurmanovych =

Ukrainian general

Viktor Kurmanovych Віктор Йосипович Курманович
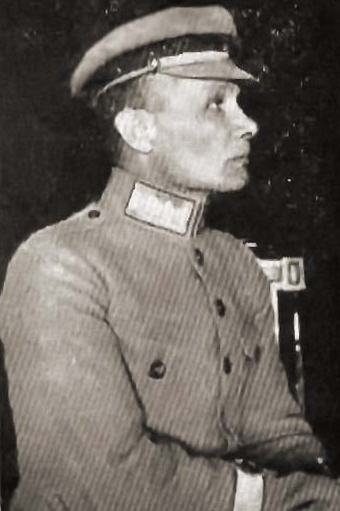
- Kurmanovych as general of the Ukrainian Galician Army, 1919

State Secretary of Armed Forces of West Ukraine
- In office February 13, 1919 – June 9, 1919
- Prime Minister: Sydir Holubovych
- Preceded by: Dmytro Vitovsky
- Succeeded by: Yevhen Petrushevych

Personal details
- Born: November 26, 1876 Velyka Vilshanytsia near Zolochiv, Galicia and Lodomeria, Austro-Hungary
- Died: October 18, 1945 (aged 68) Odessa, Soviet Union
- Education: Austrian Military Academy

Military service
- Allegiance: Austro-Hungary (1914–1918); West Ukrainian National Republic
- Branch/service: Ukrainian Galician Army
- Years of service: 1912 – 1919
- Rank: Captain; Colonel; Brigadier General; Quartermaster General
- Commands: Ukrainian Sich Riflemen; Ukrainian Galician Army
- Battles/wars: World War I Polish–Ukrainian War

Viktor Kurmanovych (Ukrainian: Віктор Йосипович Курманович; 26 November 1876, Velyka Vilshanytsia near Zolochiv, Galicia and Lodomeria, Austro-Hungary – 18 October 1945, Odessa, Soviet Union) was a Ukrainian politician and military leader.

== Biography ==
=== Early life ===
Viktor Kurmanovych was born into the family of a Greek Catholic priest in the village of Velyka Vilshanytsia in Galicia. His father stemmed from Podlachia and moved to the Galician town of Sokal following the Conversion of Chełm Eparchy, during which he had been imprisoned by Russian authorities in Berestia, later settling in Vilshanytsia. His elder brother Lev followed the father's steps and served as a priest in Zapytiv, however Viktor chose a military career.

=== In the Austrian army ===
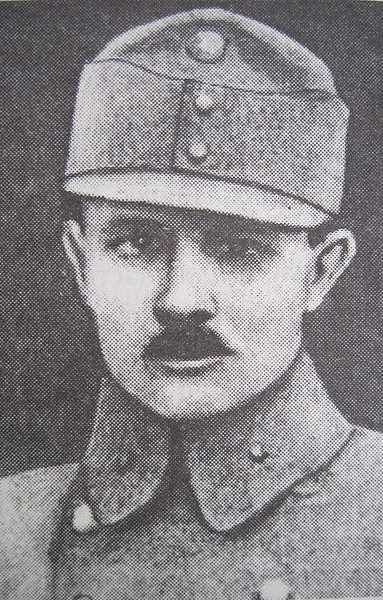
Kurmanovych in Austrian uniform, before 1918

After the local elementary school, Viktor enrolled into the Infantry Cadet School Lobzow. Upon graduating from the cadet school as one of the ten best students, Kurmanovych was directed to serve as an officer at the 48th Infantry Regiment of the Austrian Army in Krems an der Donau. He continued his studies at the Austrian Military Academy in Vienna which he finished in 1902. After service in the 30th Infantry Regiment in Lemberg, Kurmanovych was transferred to the General Staff, where he served in the department of intelligence. After 1912 he served as a battallion commander of the 13th Infantry Regiment in Bielsk Podlaski.

In advance to the First World War, Kurmanovych was sent to the Russian Empire in order to observe the potential enemy's war preparations. He visited both the European and Asian parts of the empire, returning to Galicia soon after the beginning of hostilities. Shortly thereafter Kurmanovych was sent to the outskirts of Kovel, where he was caught by Russian operatives for spying and imprisoned in Warsaw Citadel. In spring 1915 he was exchanged for a prominent Russian officer and promoted to lieutenant colonel. Initially sent to command an infantry unit in Bukovyna, in spring 1916 he was relocated to the Italian Front, where he was once again promoted to colonel and commanded an infantry brigade. During the Austrian retreat in 1918, Kurmanovych managed to preserve much of his unit intact. Following the armistice in November he arrived to Vienna for treatment.

=== Ukrainian War of Independence ===
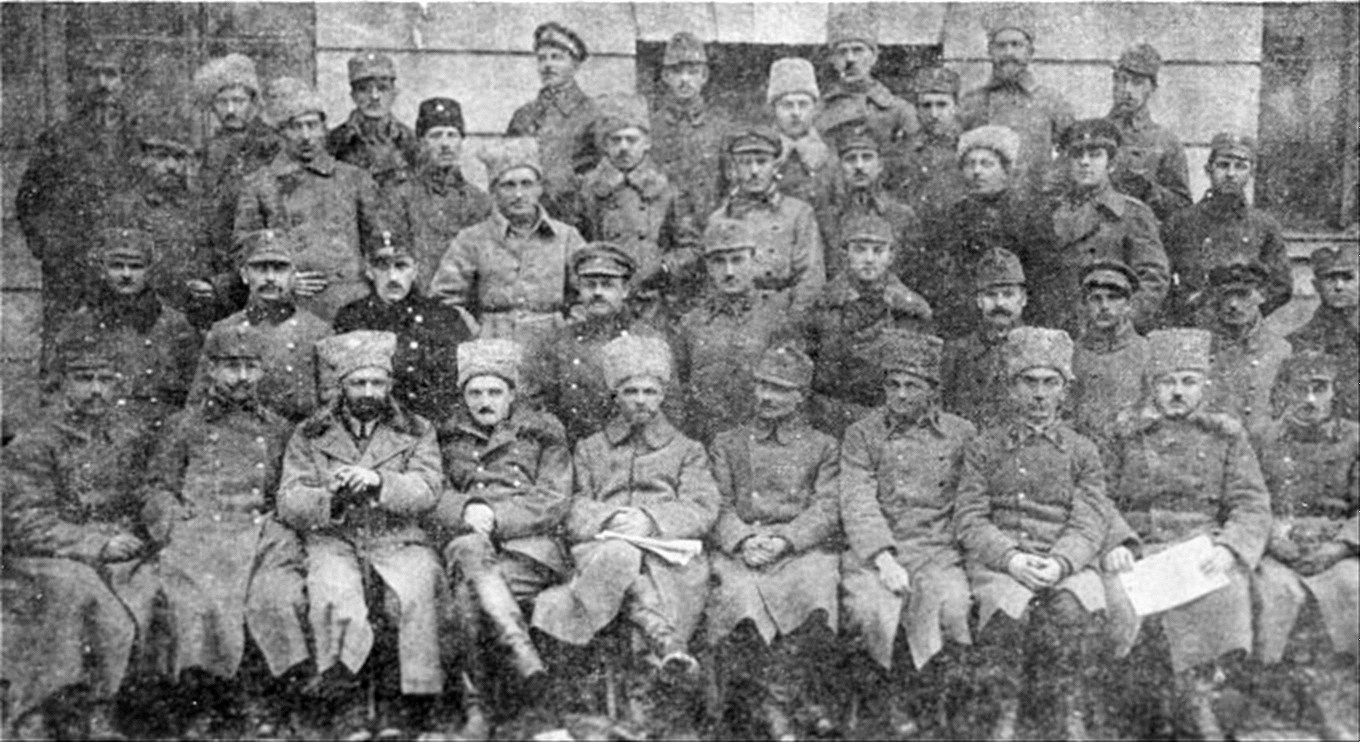
Kurmanovych (5th from the right, 1st row) among commanders of Ukrainian Galician Army

In Vienna Kurmanovych met Bukovynian politician Stepan Smal-Stotsky, who informed him about the beginning of Polish-Ukrainian hostilities in his native Galicia. The armed force of the newly proclaimed West Ukrainian People's Republic suffered from a serious lack of officers, and Kurmanovych took a decision to use his military experience for its benefit. After leaving the Vienna hospital, he travelled through Budapest and Stryi, and on 24 December 1918 reached Ternopil, where the Western Ukrainian government resided during that time. War Minister Dmytro Vitovsky and Ukrainian Galician Army commander Mykhailo Omelianovych-Pavlenko sent Kurmanovych to Zhovkva, where he was appointed commander of the army's "North" group. In early 1919 his force conducted its first successful action, forcing Polish troops to retreat in the direction of Rava-Ruska. The group was later transformed into the 1st Corps of the Galician Army. On 12 February 1919 Kurmanovych was appointed Chief of Staff of the army, and simultaneously served as State Secretary of Military Affairs following the resignation of Vitovsky.

Following a plan approved by Omelianovych-Pavlenko, he commanded the offensive in the vicinity of Vovchukhy, which was aimed to encircle the Polish troops in Lviv. However, on 18 February, after the Galician Army had achieved its first success by capturing part of the Lviv-Peremyshl railway, Kurmanovych received a telegram, which ordered him to cease hostilities in order to allow representatives of an Entente delegation to Lviv for peace talks. At a meeting in Khodoriv the delegation proposed a partition of Galicia, with Lviv and Drohobych oil fields coming under Polish control, but that plan was rejected by members of the Western Ukrainian delegation, including Kurmanovych. In March 1919 the Galician Army under Kurmanovych's direction started a second offensive at Vovchukhy, but failed to achieve decisive success. As a result, the commander proposed to liquidate the Northern Front and relocate the main Ukrainian force to the south of the Dniester, in order to establish contact with Czechoslovakia, but this proposal was rejected by the Western Ukrainian government. On 22 April Kurmanovych initiated a ministerial decree introducing a standard uniform for the Galician Army. However, in May Ukrainian troops had to retreat under Polish pressure to the east, in the direction of Zbruch river, and Kurmanovych's ministry had to relocate from Stanislaviv to Buchach, and then to Chortkiv.

By June 1919 the territory controlled by the Galician Army had been limited to the area between the Zbruch, Dniester and the railway line Husiatyn-Chortkiv. Proposal were made to relocate the whole army to the other side of the Zbruch, in "Greater Ukraine". Despite this, Kurmanovych continued to insist on fighting in Galicia. On 5 June 1919 he issued an order to 1st Corps commander Myron Tarnavsky to prepare a final offensive against Polish troops. Following the retreat across the Zbruch Galician troops joined forces with the Army of the Ukrainian People's Republic, and Kurmanovych was promoted to Brigadier General. On August 11, 1919 he became the Quartermaster General at the General Bulawa (Military Council) of the Chief Otaman. On that position he was responsible for planning the offensive against Kyiv, Odesa and Uman. During the conflict against Denikin's White Army in autumn, Kurmanovych supervised the relocation of Ukrainian troops from Kyiv to the vicinity of Bila Tserkva, Uman and Khrystynivka.

=== Emigration and last years ===
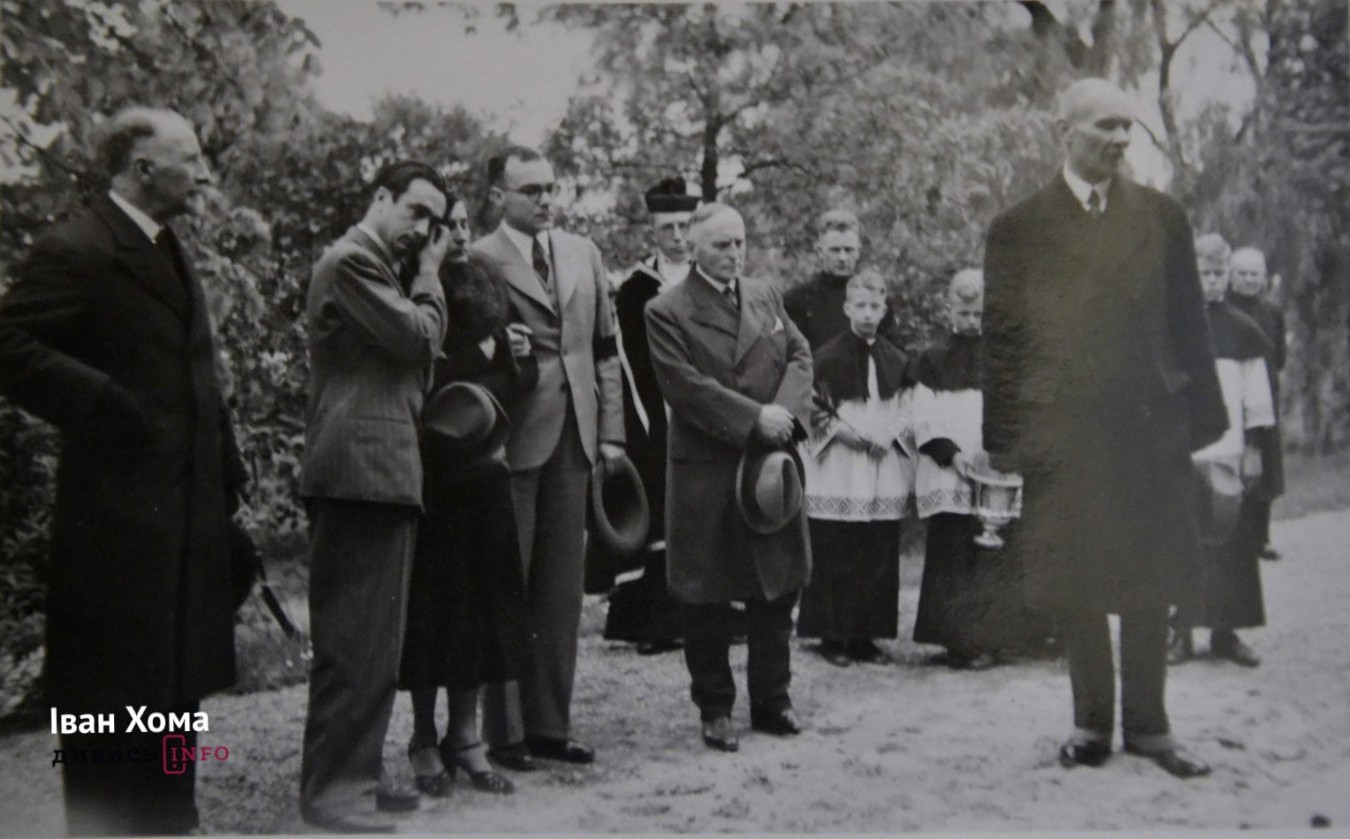
Kurmanovych (right) during the funeral of Yevhen Konovalets, 1938

Following the liquidation of Chief Otaman's Headquarters in late 1919, Kurmanovych left for treatment in Czechoslovakia, and later joined the Galician troops interned in Německe Jablonné. On 30 October 1920 the Government of the West Ukrainian People's Republic in exile appointed him to command the Galician Brigade formed from the troops stationed at the location. Following the liquidation of the camp in 1923, Kurmanovych moved to Vienna and worked at an automobile factory. He cooperated with Mykola Kapustiansky to establish the Organization of Ukrainian Nationalists (OUN). Kurmanovych was also active as deputy head of the Ukrainian National Organization in Germany, and in 1938 held a lecture in Berlin dedicated to the 20th anniversary of the Battle of Kruty. From 1933 to 1938 he lived in the Free City of Danzig, after that moved to the Carpathian Ukraine, where he supported the formation of Ukrainian military units. In 1943 Kurmanovych arrived to Lviv, where he was appointed honorary chief of administration at the Galicia Division. In April 1945 Kurmanovych was arrested in Baden bei Wien by the Soviet military counter-intelligence SMERSH and transferred to the Soviet Union. He died in the NKVD prison hospital of Odessa.

== Sources ==
- Aleksander Kolańczuk - "Ukraińscy generałowie w Polsce, emigranci polityczni w latach 1920-1939. Słownik biograficzny", Przemyśl 2009, ISBN 978-83-60374-11-5
