= Blavatskyi =

Blavatskyi (Ukrainian: Блавацький) is a Ukrainian surname. It may refer to

- Bohdan Blavatskyi (born 1963), Soviet Ukrainian former football forward and now a football coach
- Ivan Blavatskyi (1887–1963), Ukrainian Greek Catholic priest and public figure
