= Ukrainian National Democratic Party =

Ukrainian National Democratic Party Українська національно-демократична партія
- Founded: 1899
- Dissolved: 1919 (reformed)
- Preceded by: Ruthenian-Ukrainian Radical Party
- Succeeded by: Ukrainian Labor Party
- Headquarters: Lviv
- Ideology: Ukrainian nationalism Civic nationalism
- Political position: Centre-right

Ukrainian National Democratic Party (Ukrainian: Українська національно-демократична партія), (Note: Before 1914 known as Ruthenian National Democratic Party (Ukrainian: Руська національно-демократична партія) and Ruthenian-Ukrainian National Democratic Party (Ukrainian: Русько-українська національно-демократична партія).) abbreviated as UNDP, was a political party established by right wing members of the Ruthenian-Ukrainian Radical Party in Galicia. Founded in 1899, the party based its program on the ideas of nationalism and democracy, dominating the political life of Ukrainian community in Galicia and Bukovina under the Austrian rule. Members of UNDP played a leading role in the proclamation of the West Ukrainian People's Republic in 1918.

== History ==
The party was established on 26 December 1899 in Lviv following a split in the Ruthenian-Ukrainian Radical Party. Among its founding members were former Radicals Volodymyr Okhrymovych, Yevhen Levytsky, Vyacheslav Budzynovsky and Ivan Franko, as well as members of the populist Ukrainophile "People's Council" Yulian Romanchuk and Kost Levytsky, along with Mykhailo Hrushevsky, Yevhen Olesnytsky and Teofil Okunevsky. The party was headed by the "People's Committee" composed of M. Hrushevsky, K. Levytsky, V. Okhrymovych, D. Savchak and I. Franko. Among its other prominent members were Vasyl Nahirnyi, Ivan Beley and Yevhen Ozarkevych.

UNDP had 17 of its members elected to the Imperial Council during the 1907 Cisleithanian legislative election, more than half of all mandates taken by Ukrainian parties in Galicia. It managed to repeat that success in the 1911 election. In 1913, 23 members of the party were elected to the Galician Sejm. In the regional and all-Austrian legislatures, UNDP representatives joined the "Ruthenian Club", cooperating with members of the Ukrainian Radical Party.

During the First World War members of UNDP cooperated with other Ukrainian parties as part of the Main Ukrainian Council and General Ukrainian Council. Between 1914 and 1916 the party's leadership was based in Vienna. During an extraordinary congress in late December 1917, UNDP's members voiced support for the Third Universal of the Ukrainian Central Rada, which proclaimed the Ukrainian People's Republic and demanded that Ukrainian representatives be allowed to take part in peace talks. The party greeted the proclamation of independence of the Ukrainian People's Republic and approved the signing of the Treaty of Brest-Litovsk between Ukraine and the Central Powers. On 25 March 1918, in a joint declaration with members of the Ukrainian Radical Party and Ukrainian Social Democratic Party, UNDP called for ratification of the treaty and separation of Eastern Galicia, simultaneously opposing the Polonization of Kholmshchyna.

In August 1918 UNDP's leadership started secret preparations for a takeover of power in Galicia. On 18 October 1918 the party initiated the establishment of the Ukrainian National Council, and its representatives played an active role in the November Uprising in Lviv. In November 1918 UNDP members were among founders of the West Ukrainian People's Republic. Among the party's activists leading the republic were Yevhen Petrushevych, Kost Levytsky and Sydir Holubovych. UNDP promoted the unification of the two Ukrainian republics, but at the same time supported the preservation of Western Ukraine's autonomy, including its own legislature and government institutions. Following the official declaration of union on 22 January 1919, representatives of the party took part in the Labour Congress of Ukraine in Kyiv.

In April 1919, at a party congress in Stanislaviv, UNDP changed its name into Labour Party (Ukrainian: Трудова партія). In 1923 it split in two separate groups, which on 11 July 1925 merged with the Ukrainian Party of National Work, creating the Ukrainian National Democratic Alliance.

== Ideology ==
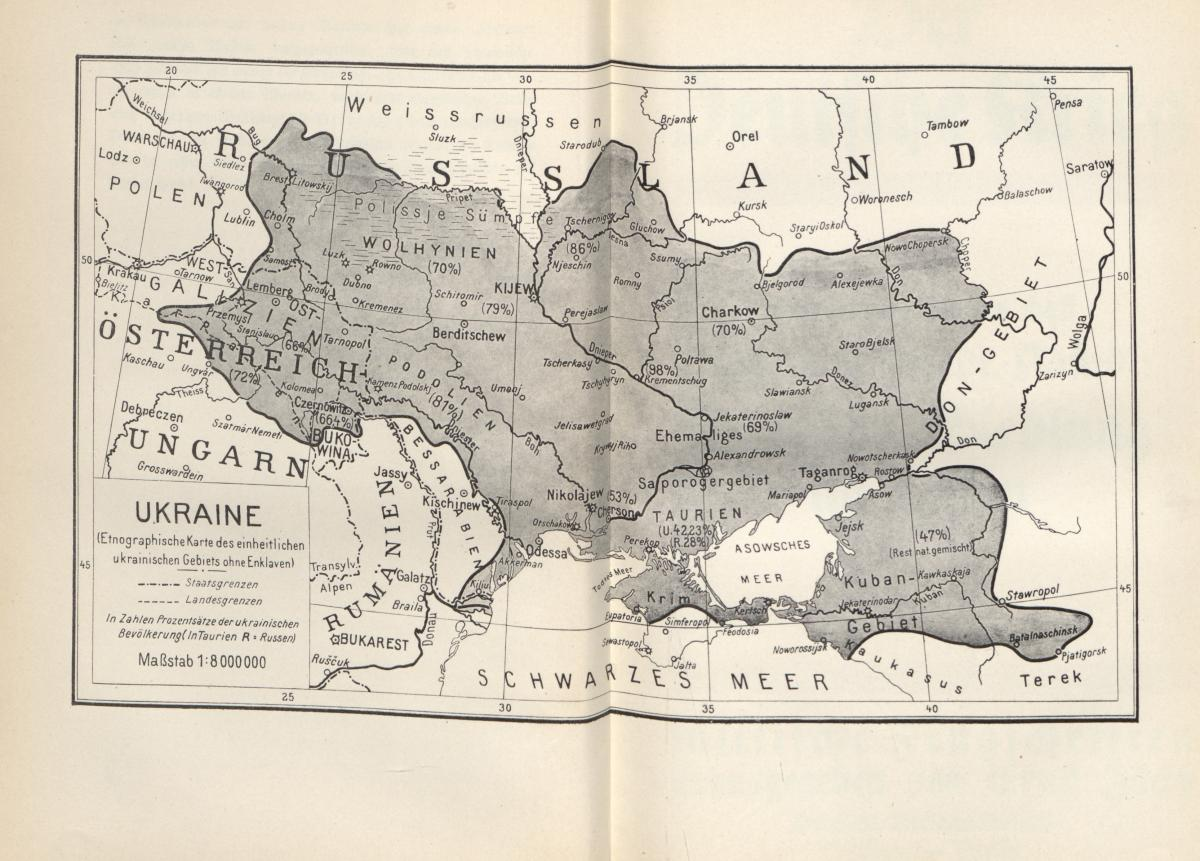
An ethnographic map of Ukraine published by UNDP activist Yevhen Levytsky in 1915

UNDP supported a broad autonomy of Galicia, Bukovina and Transcarpathia as parts of Austria-Hungary. It promoted electoral reform, spread of national consciousness and development of the civil society. Among the party's demands was abolition of the curial system and establishment of direct, equal and secret ballot, as well as provision of basic constitutional freedoms to all subjects.

UNDP's socioeconomic program envisioned inviolability of private property, but mandated purchase of land from major landowners and its sale to poor and landless peasants on affordable terms. The party promoted a reform of taxation in order to alleviate the situation of peasants, development of agricultural and professional education, as well as state support for various types of cooperatives. In the sphere of culture, UNDP supported the establishment of Ukrainian-language schools, creation of Ukrainian gymnasiums, real schools and teachers' seminaries, foundation of a Ukrainian university in Lviv and mandatory teaching of Ukrainian in all schools located in the territories with a Ukrainian ethnic majority. In the spehere of religion, the party supported the equality of all church organizations, rites and confessions.

UNDP strove to unite all social classes and political currents of the Ukrainian community. On 5 January 1900 the party's inaugural congress issued its political program, which contained following declarations:

We, Galician Ruthenians, part of the Ukrainian-Ruthenian people, which had once enjoyed state autonomy, and then for many centuries fought for its political rights, having never relinquished the rights of an independent people, declare, that the final goal of our struggle is to reach cultural, economical and political autonomy of the whole Ukrainian-Ruthenian people and its eventual unification into a single national organism...

In our struggle to reach that goal, and considering our affiliation with the Austrian state, we are establishing for ourselves the following program: in the borders of Austria, the division of Galicia into a Polish and a Ruthenian part, and of Bukovina into a Ruthenian and Wallachian [part], and creation from the Ruthenian parts of Galicia and Bukovina of a single national province with a separate administration and a separate legislature...

We will support, strengthen and develop the feeling of national unity with Russian Ukrainians and fight to establish cultural unity with them; among Russian Ukrainians we will support the struggle, which leads to the transformation of the Russian state into a constitutional federal state, based on the autonomy of nations...

Concerning Hungarian Rus, we will fight for creation of a national movement among Hungarian Ruthenians, similar to the one which exists among Galician and Bukovinian Ruthenians, in order to encourage them to use and cherish the native language and lead cultural, economical and political activities for the benefit of the Ukrainian-Ruthenian people...

== Organization and activities ==
The People's Congress, which was called up annually, served as the party's supreme organ.

The weekly newspaper Svoboda, established in 1897, served as UNDP's press organ. The party's political platform was also supported by the editors of Dilo and Bukovyna newspapers. UNDP's ideas also influenced the publications of Ukrainische Rundschau.

Despite being dominated by secular politicians, UNDP's network on the ground actively recruited Greek Catholic priests, which contributed to the efficiency of its campaigns and led to growth in the party's ranks. Cooperation with the church contributed to the spread of the Ukrainian national idea among Galician peasantry, but at the same time led many priests to overthink their role in society, turning them into social activists first and relegating pastoral work to a secondary role.

Following a 1908 decree by metropolitan Andrey Sheptytsky, which aimed to limit the participation of parish priests in politics, Lonhyn Tsehelsky, chief editor of Dilo newspaper, which promoted UNDP's political platform, accused the bishop of being a "Polish agent" aiming to weaken the Ukrainian church. Eventually, both sides managed to reach a compromise.

UNDP exerted great influence on the activities of Ukrainian cultural and economic societies, such as Prosvita and Sokil.

== Leadership ==
=== Party leaders ===
- Yulian Romanchuk (1899-1907)
- Kost Levytsky (1907-1919)

=== Secretaries ===
- Kost Levytsky (1899-1907)
- Volodymyr Bachynsky (1907-1913)
- Stepan Baran (1913-1919)

== Election results ==
=== Austria-Hungary ===
House of Deputies
Year	Popular vote	%	Seats	Seat change	Government
1907	304,410	6,59%	20 / 516	+19	
1911	326,955	7.21%	23 / 516	+3	

== See also ==
- National Democracy (Ukraine)
