= Church of the Holy Trinity, Tovstenke =

Greek Catholic church in Tovstenke, Ukraine

Church of the Holy Trinity Церква Пресвятої Трійці
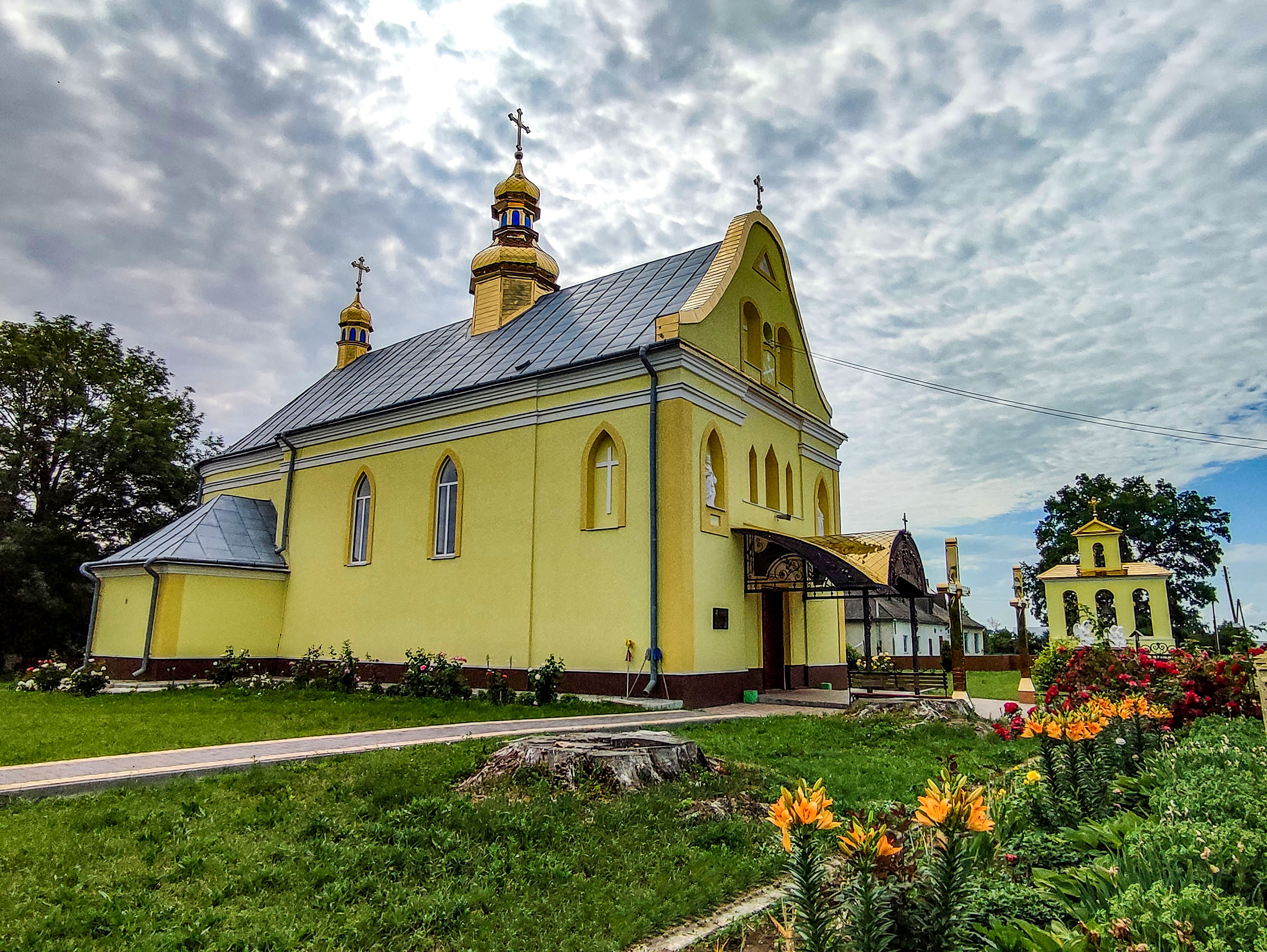

- Location within Ternopil Oblast

Religion
- Affiliation: Ukrainian Greek Catholic Church

Location
- Location: Tovstenke
- Interactive map of Church of the Holy Trinity; Церква Пресвятої Трійці
- Coordinates: 49°01′43.4″N 26°03′26.9″E

The Church of the Holy Trinity is a parish and church of the Greek Catholic community of the Probizhnyanskyi Deanery of the Buchach Eparchy of the Ukrainian Greek Catholic Church in Tovstenke, Chortkiv Raion, Ternopil Oblast.

== History ==
The parish in Tovstenke joined the UGCC in the early 18th century. From 1730 to 1731, a church and bell tower were built from oak on a stone foundation, though the church later burned down in 1821.

The community began building a new stone church in 1826, but the work halted, likely due to a lack of materials. The project resumed in 1843 and was completed in 1846. Meanwhile, a stone bell tower was constructed in 1844, and the new church was solemnly consecrated in 1847. In 1838, Metropolitan Mykhailo Levytskyi visited the parish on a canonical visit.

In 1926, Bishop Hryhoriy Khomyshyn visited the parish and granted the church the right to celebrate two feast days, a decision approved by the Vatican. The parish later fell under the control of the ROC in 1948 before returning to the UGCC in 1990. During the service of Fr. Vasyl Pohoretskyi, the church was repaired, and in 1991, the roofs of both the church and the bell tower were replaced. Two parishioners crafted crosses for the church in 1995.

In 2021, local historian Yukhym Makoterskyi initiated the installation of a memorial plaque for Fr. Ivan Blavatskyi on the church's facade.

The parish is an active community with the Pope's Worldwide Prayer Network and the Sodality of Our Lady brotherhoods. A Sunday school is run by Fr. Hryhorii Shafran and his wife, Alisiia Shafran. The church also benefits from the dedication of long-serving members, including Tadei Kaminskyi, who has been a palamar for 28 years, and Mykhailo Vavrushko, who has served as treasurer for 22 years.

== Priests ==
- о. Andrii Syroichkovskyi (?-1809)
- о. Yakiv Syroichkovskyi (1809-1841)
- о. Yurii Lukasevych (1841)
- о. Mykhailo Dasevych (1841-1877)
- о. Ivan Blavatskyi (1919-1921)
- о. Ivan Lushpynskyi (1922-?)
- о. Vasyl Kosmyna (1935)
- о. Stanislav-Julian Herus (1933-1938)
- о. Mykola Stetsyk (1938-1945)
- о. Anatolii Sydorenko (1945)
- о. Mykhailo Klym (1946-1948)
- о. Osyp Antoshkiv (1946-1948)
- о. Anatolii Sydorenko (1946-1948)
- о. Nestor Kysilevych
- о. Volodymyr Romanyshyn
- о. Petro Vysotskyi
- о. Viktor Chornyi
- о. Osyp Yanishevskyi
- о. Volodymyr Panchak
- о. Roman Vodianyi
- о. Vasyl Formaziuk
- о. Vasyl Pohoretskyi
- о. Hryhorii Shafran (1991–present)
