= State Secretariat of West Ukrainian People's Republic =

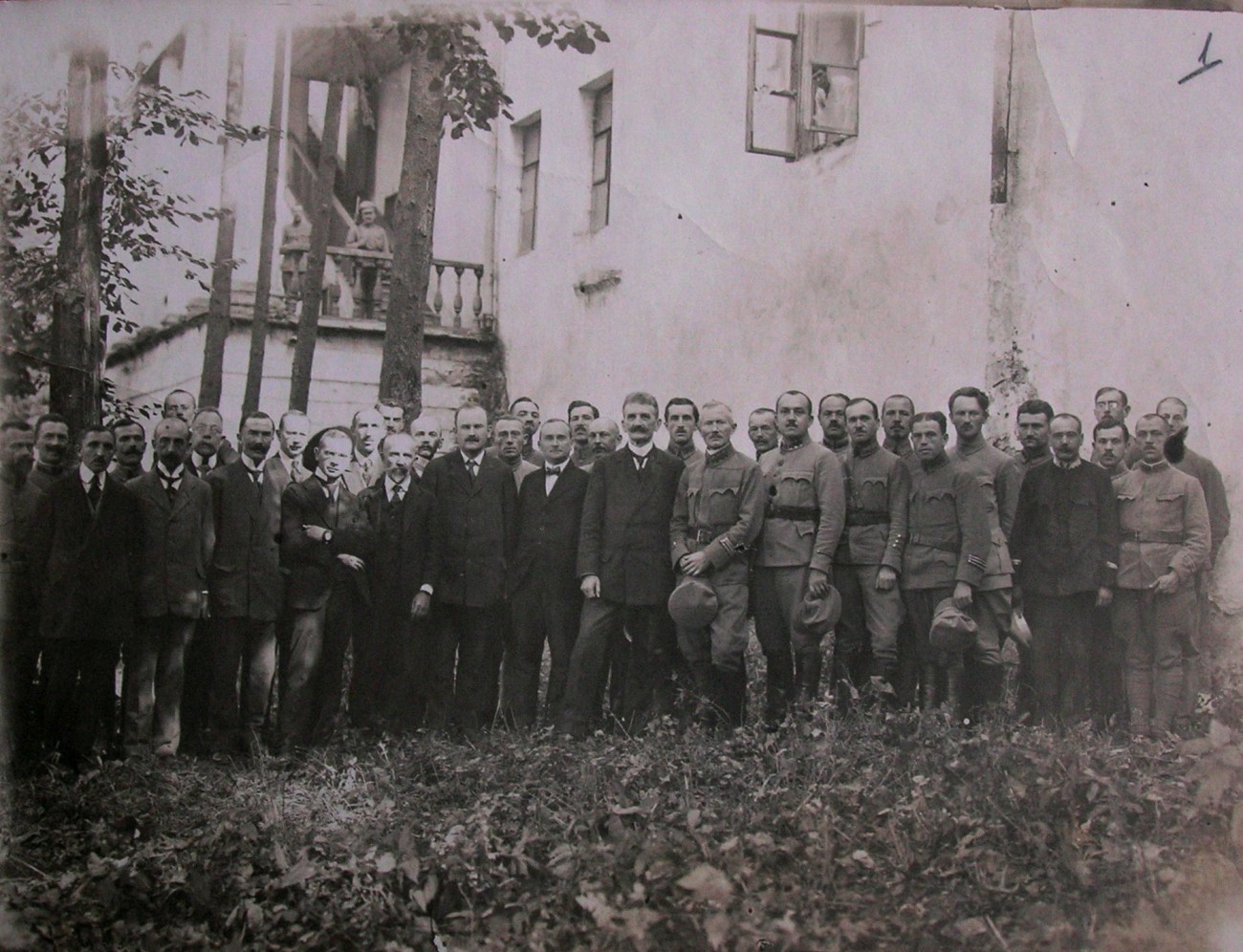
Members of ZUNR government in Kamianets-Podilskyi, 1919

State Secretariat of West Ukrainian People's Republic (WUPR, ZUNR) — the highest executive and administrative body WUPR, the government of the republic. Created in Lviv on November 9, 1918 UNCouncil ZUNR.

The First Head of the State Secretariat — Kost Levytsky, State Secretary of Finance.

State secretaries (ministers):

- Military Affairs — Dmytro Vitovsky,
- Internal Affairs — Lonhyn Tsehelsky,
- Foreign Affairs — Vasyl Paneyko, Stepan Vytvytsky; Mykhailo Lozynsky — Secretary of State of Foreign Affairs (1919).
- Judiciary — Sydir Holubovych,
- Land Affairs — Stepan Baran, Mykhaylo Martynets
- Trade and fisheries — Yaroslav Lytvynovych,
- Ways — Ivan Myron,
- Post and Telegraph — Olexandr Pisetsky,
- Health — Ivan Kurovets,
- Education and religion — Oleksander Barvinsky,
- Public Works — Ivan Makukh,
- Work and social care — Antin Chernetsky.

After the Galician Army left Lviv Galician government from 24 November to 31 December 1918 was in Ternopil. Of the 14 state secretaries could come from the city K. Levytsky, D. Vitovsky, S. Holubovyvh, Ivan Makuch, I. Myron, W. Paneyko, O. Pisetsky, L. Tsehelsky.

Government authority was the newspaper "Ukrainian voice" (from 27 November 1918).

== Sources ==
- (in Ukrainian) Литвин М., Науменко К. Історія ЗУНР.— Львів: Інститут українознавства НАНУ, видавнича фірма «Олір», 1995.— 368 с., іл. ISBN 5-7707-7867-9
- (in Ukrainian) Павлишин О. Рада державних секретарів // Західно-Українська Народна Республіка 1918-1923. Енциклопедія. Т. 3: П - С. Івано-Франківськ: Манускрипт-Львів, 2020. С. 290-293. ISBN 978-966-2067-65-1
