= Yaniv Cemetery =

Large cemetery in Lviv

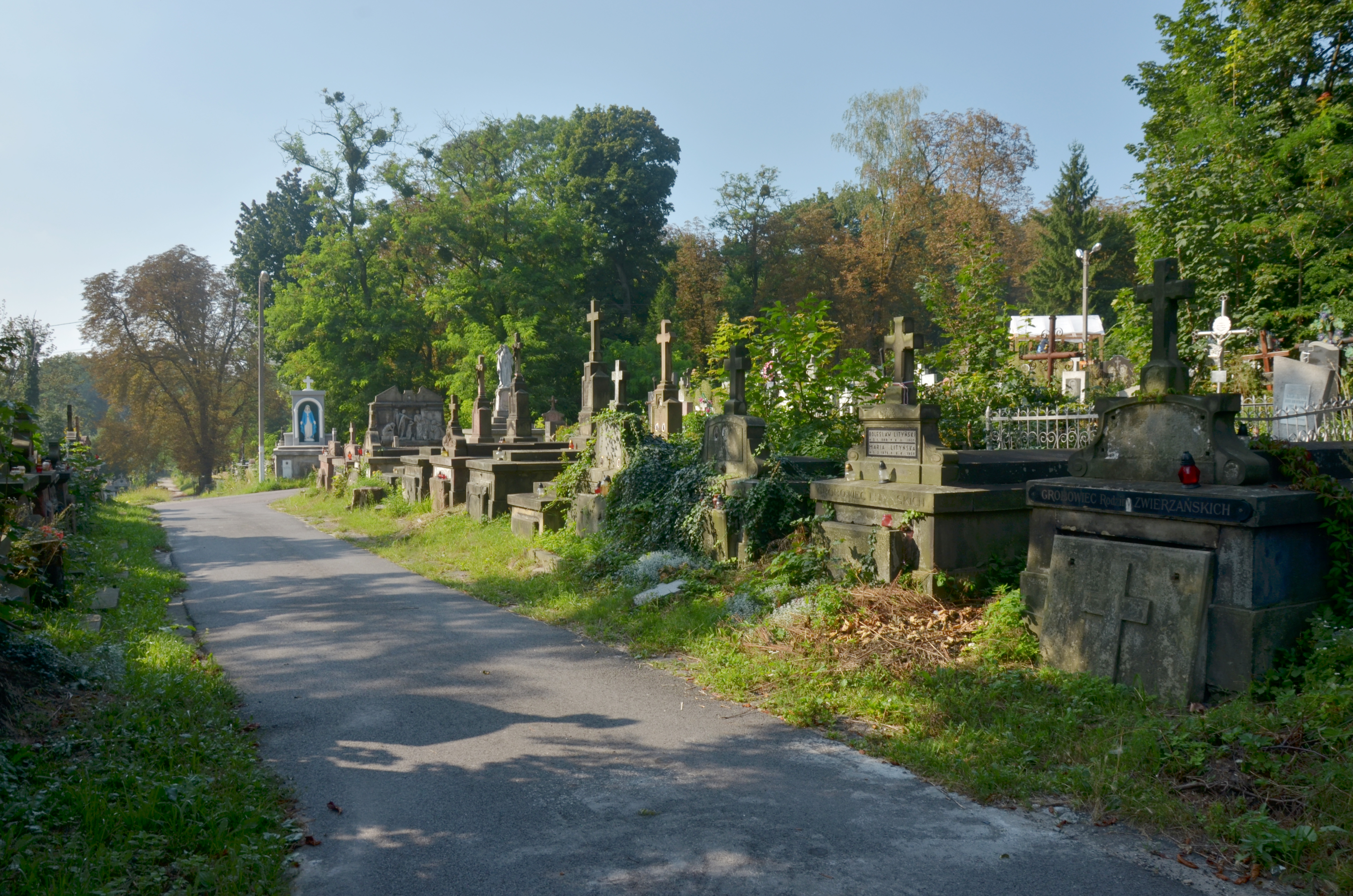
- Interactive map of Yaniv Cemetery

Details
- Established: August 5, 1888
- Location: Lviv
- Country: Ukraine
- Coordinates: 49°51′08″N 23°59′49″E

Yaniv Cemetery (Ukrainian: Янівський цвинтар; Polish: Cmentarz Janowski) is a cemetery located in the Shevchenkivskyi District of Lviv. It is located in the slopes of the Kortumivka hill on the outskirts of the Klepariv historical area. The main entrance is located on Shevchenko Street.

== History ==
During the late 19th century, Austro-Hungarian Lviv (then known as Lemberg) experienced a massive population increase from 70,000 people in 1857 to 120,000 in 1890. It was impossible to expand the now Stryi and Horodok cemeteries, and it was problematic to take bodies from all over the city to the Lychakiv Cemetery. In 1884, the city advisory council of health and a specially convened commission of members of the magistrate and the city council concluded that the Yaniv suburb would be the most suitable site for a new cemetery. Due to bureaucratic red tape, the cemetery's opening was delayed from the original date of October 1, 1887.

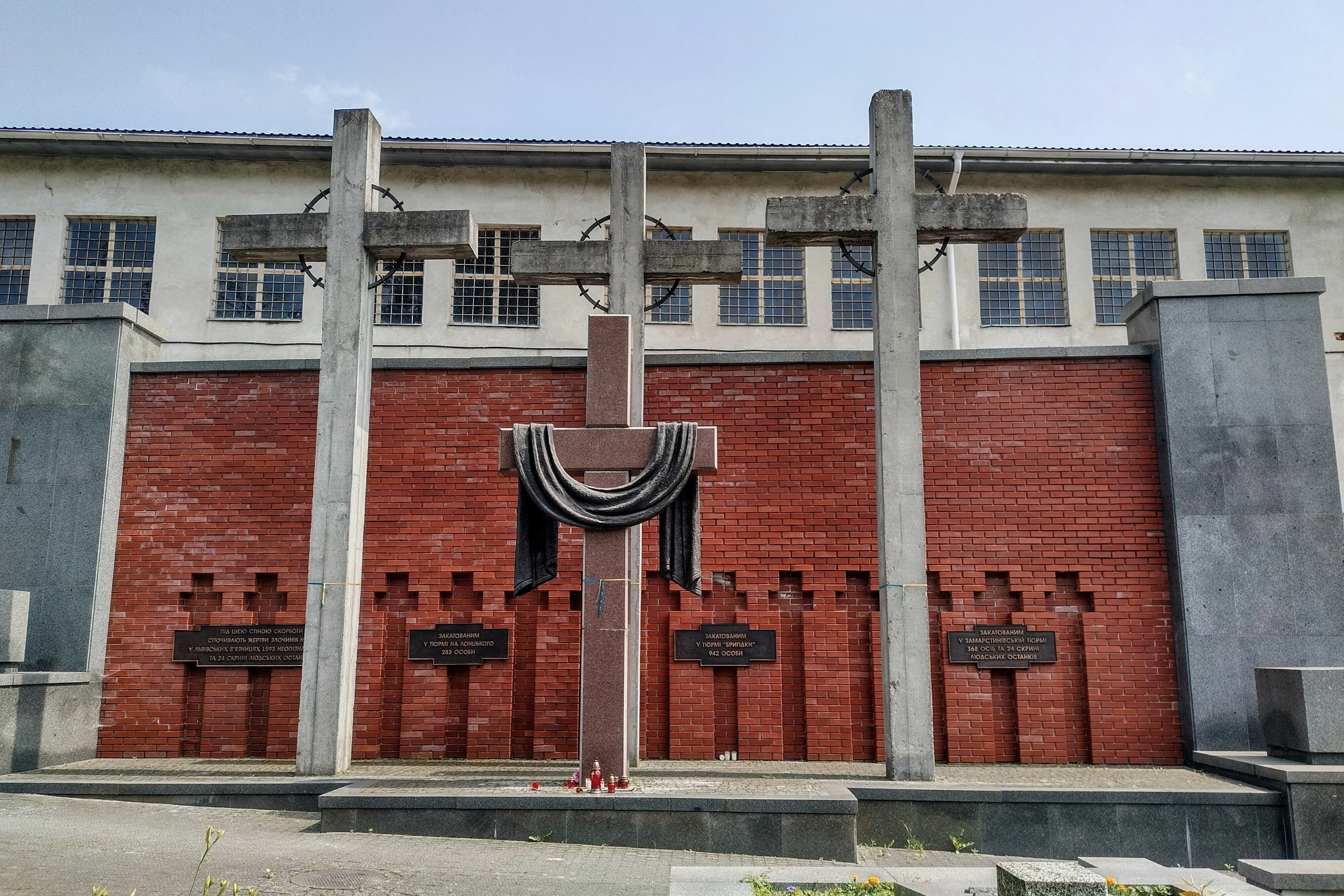
Memorial to those "Innocently killed by NKVD executioners in Lviv prisons"

On July 5, 1888, the city council divided the city into 3 burial zones between the Yaniv, Stryi and Lychakiv cemeteries, and on August 5, 1888, the first burial was made there. The oldest burial was moved from the Horodok Cemetery. As of 1937, the cemetery had 54 fields and about 115,000 burials.

During October 1939 rumors spread about the preparation of an uprising against the Soviet occupation. Due to that, the NKVD searched the graves at the cemetery in search of weapons. In 1941, during the Red Army's retreat, mass executions of political prisoners by the NKVD took place in Lviv prisons. In the cemetery, there is a joint burial for the unknown victims of the Brygidki prison. In 1980, the cemetery was closed for further burials, due to a lack of space.

== Memorial of riflemen and senior officers of the USS and UGA legion ==
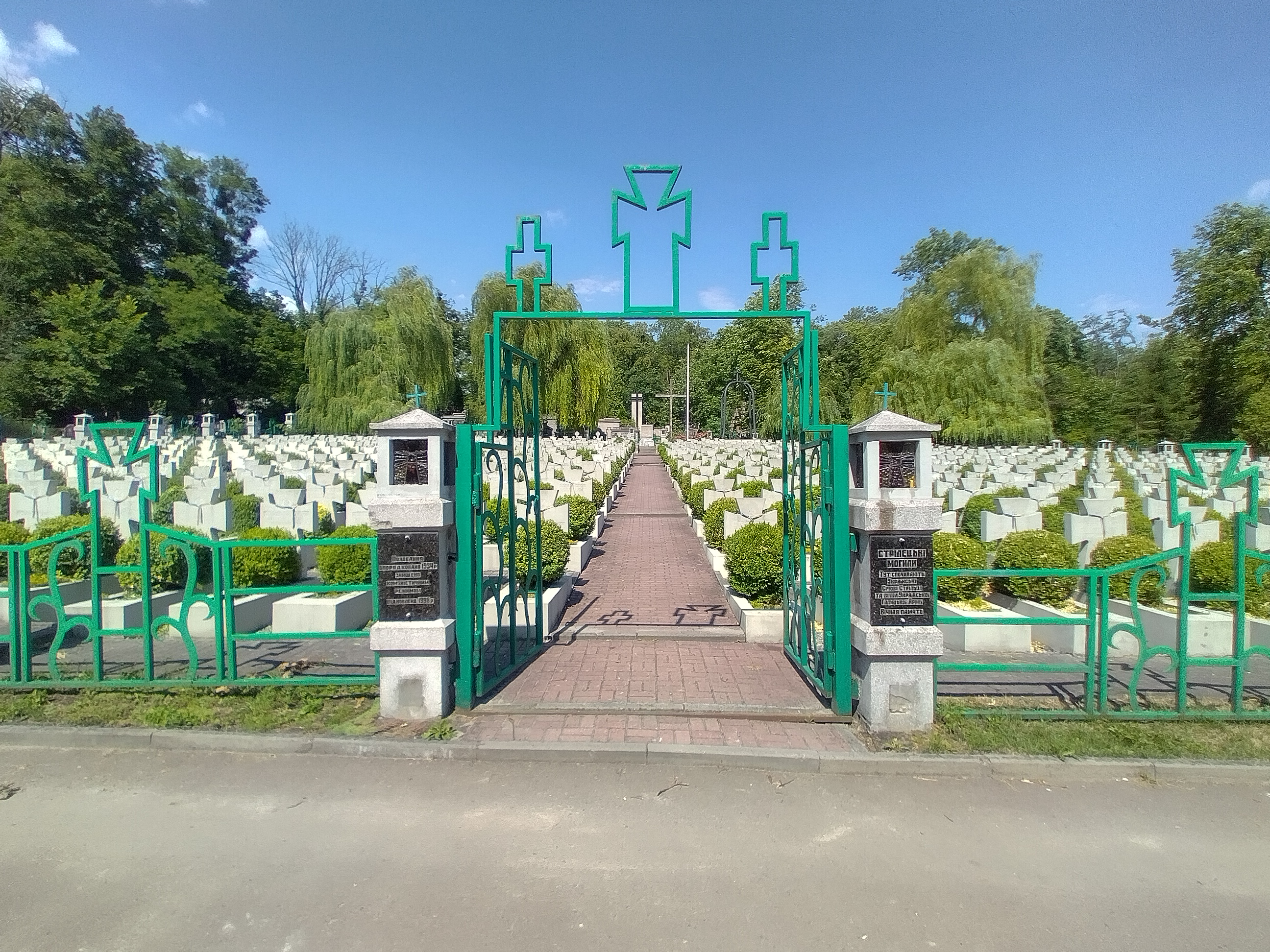
Memorial of riflemen and senior officers of the USS legion and soldiers of the Ukrainian Galician Army

Fields 38 and 38a were set aside for the burial of soldiers of the Ukrainian Galician Army, which died during the 1918 November Uprising in Lemberg and during the Polish–Ukrainian War in 1918–1919. At first, the burials were managed by the Plast Organization, and from 1927 they were managed by the Society for the Protection of War Graves. In 1934, 440 concrete tombstones with Cossack Crosses were instaled.

In 1971, on the instruction of the Lviv Regional Executive Committee, the destruction of this part of the cemetery began. Bulldozers tore down graves and crosses, which were later used to pave roads. The only graves that survived were the ones of Myron Tarnavsky and Kost Levytsky, although without their Crosses. Later that year, the Soviet dissident Viacheslav Chornovil sent a sharp protest to government institutions against the Vandalism.

In 1997–1999, the memorial was restored by the Ukrzakhidproektrestavratsiya institute under the leadership of Olga Petryshyn. Burials in 1970–1980 were moved to other sites. The graves of Myron Tarnavsky and Kost Levytsky were also restored, and Ben Vasyl Kostovych was reburied next to them. The grand opening took place in November 1998.
