= Holubovych =

Holubovych is a surname. Notable people with the surname include:

- Vsevolod Holubovych (1885–1939), Ukrainian politician
- Sydir Holubovych (1873–1938), Ukrainian politician
