= Symbolic grave of the fighters for freedom of Ukraine, Tovstenke =

Monument in Tovstenke, Ukraine

Symbolic grave of the fighters for freedom of Ukraine
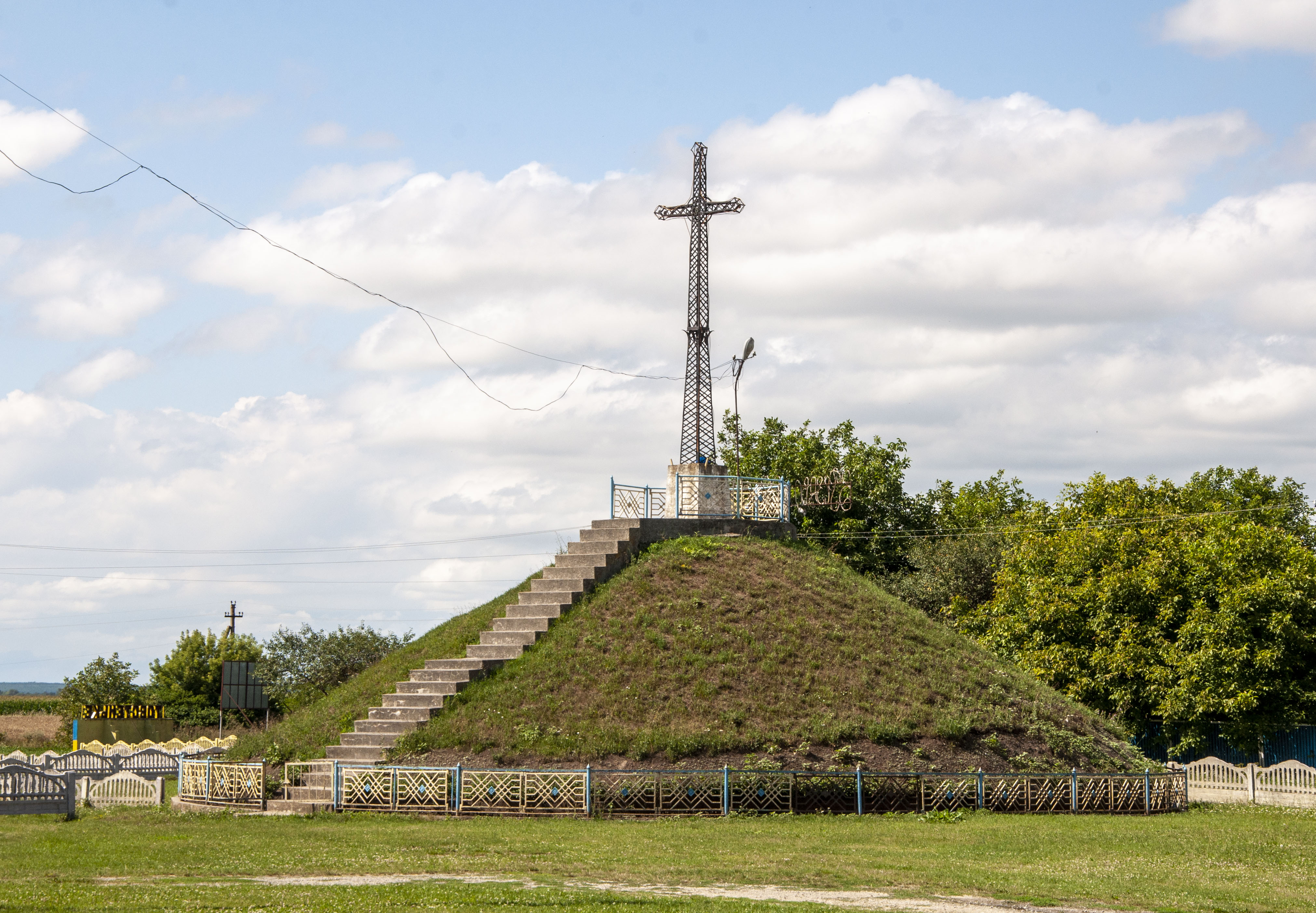
- Completion date: 20 June 1921
- Type: Symbolic grave
- Location: Tovstenke, Ternopil Oblast, Ukraine; 49°01′50″N 26°03′20″E

The Symbolic grave of the fighters for freedom of Ukraine is a Ukrainian monument in the village of Tovstenke in the Kolyndiany Hromada of the Chortkiv Raion of Ternopil Oblast, Ukraine.

The first memorial to the Ukrainian Sich Riflemen and soldiers of the Ukrainian Galician Army in Galicia.

== History ==
In 1920, Ivan Blavatskyi, together with like-minded people, initiated the construction of a symbolic grave in memory of those who died in World War I. The priest came to the starosta and asked on behalf of the entire community for permission to put a cross on the square by the road, without mentioning what his goal was. The latter replied: "Please do, because we are Catholic Christians".

Young and old people filled the grave day and night. Together with the blacksmith Mykhailo Prokopovych and his sons Ivan and Mariian, they made a plan to use the iron staples that were used to cover the trenches to make a large cross on the high grave. In a short period of time, a majestic cross with a height of 10 meters appeared on an 8-meter grave.

The Polish authorities could only observe the actions of the people. The marble tablet with the words: "Fight, fight, God helps you," was not allowed to be installed on the grave. People buried it deep in the ground.

On 20 June 1921, the grave was consecrated by 17 priests who came from as many as three counties. There were even representatives from Lviv. Father Severyn Matkovskyi, a priest from Bosyry, was the first to speak.

Every year during the Polish occupation, on the Green week, the monument became the center of manifestos of the Ukrainian population of the surrounding villages. It was also a tradition on these weeks to walk from the church in a procession to the grave, which was decorated with wreaths.

In 1940, for the first time since the existence of the grave, none of the priests marched out of the church, because it was the time of Bolshevik rule. Nevertheless, the people left the church and went to the grave without banners. They stood and sang the song "God is Great" near the grave. A department of the NKVED arrived from Probizhna immediately and searched for the organizers of this event, but they never found them. The same year, the Soviets partially destroyed the monument.

A few years before Ukraine's independence, in 1989, the monument was completely destroyed. On 4 September 1990, at the request of the village community, the grave was restored in almost the same place.

On 15 August 2021, its 100th anniversary was celebrated.

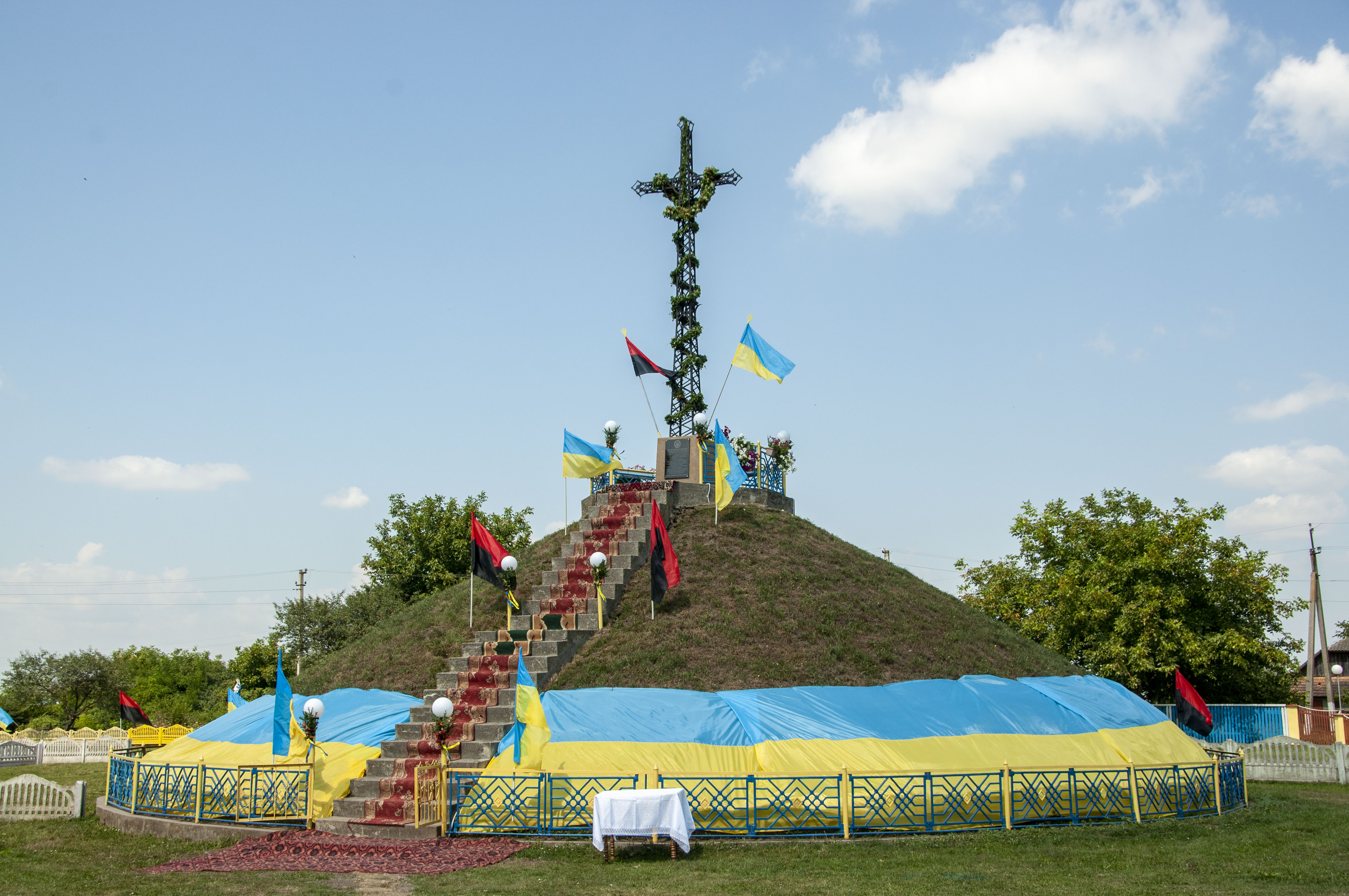
The grave on the day of the celebration

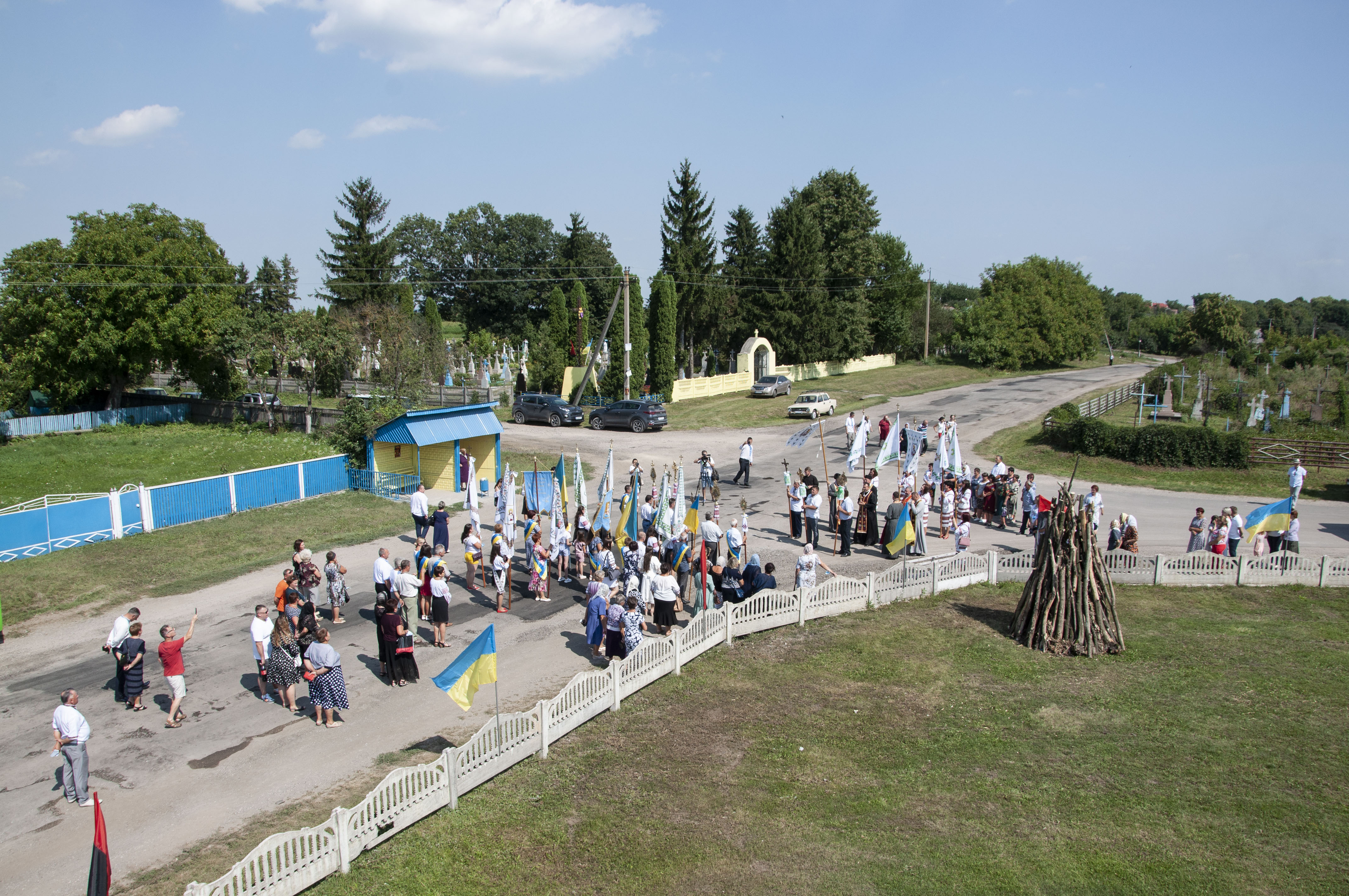
Youth procession

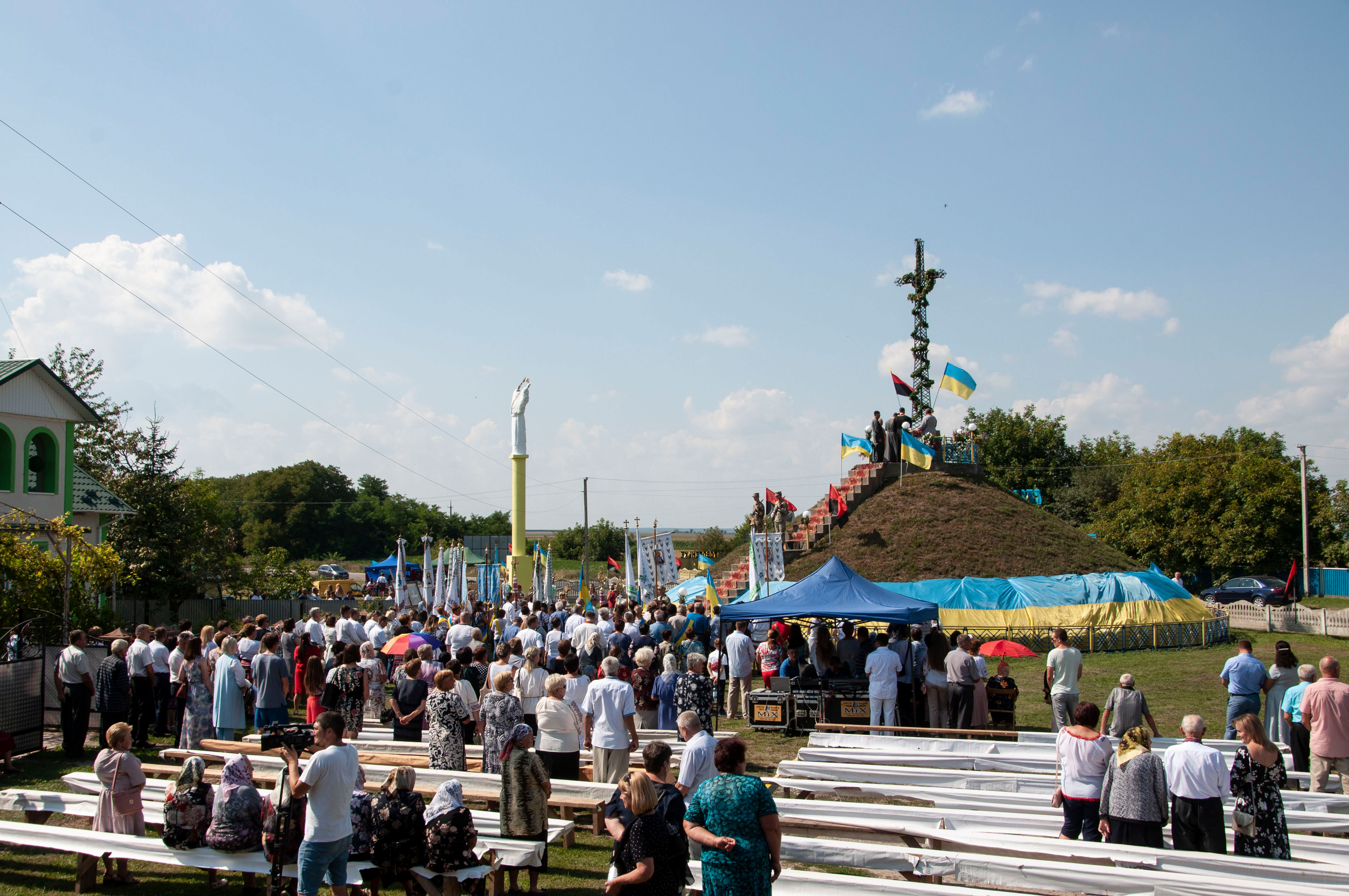
Memorial service

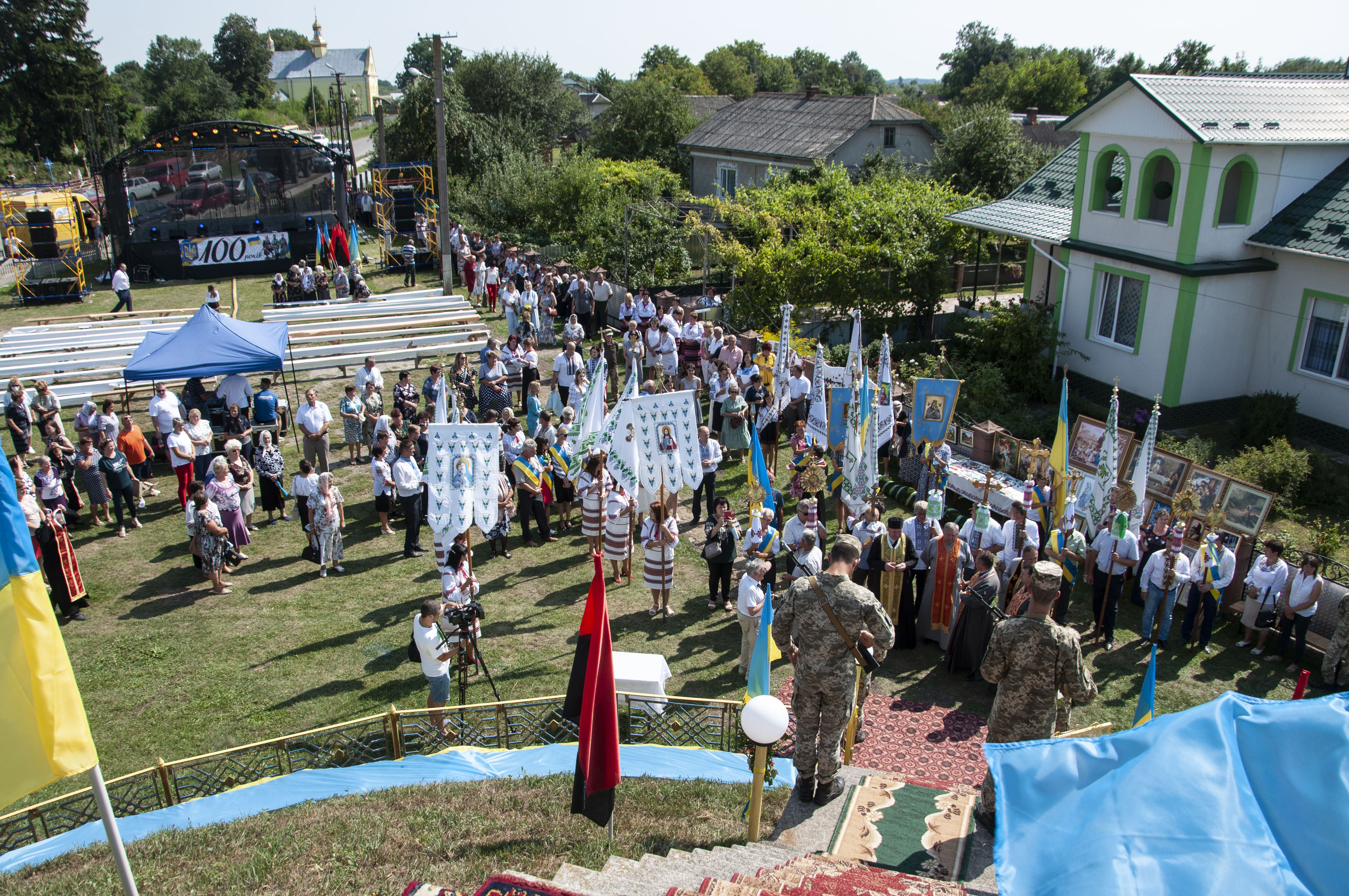
Memorial service

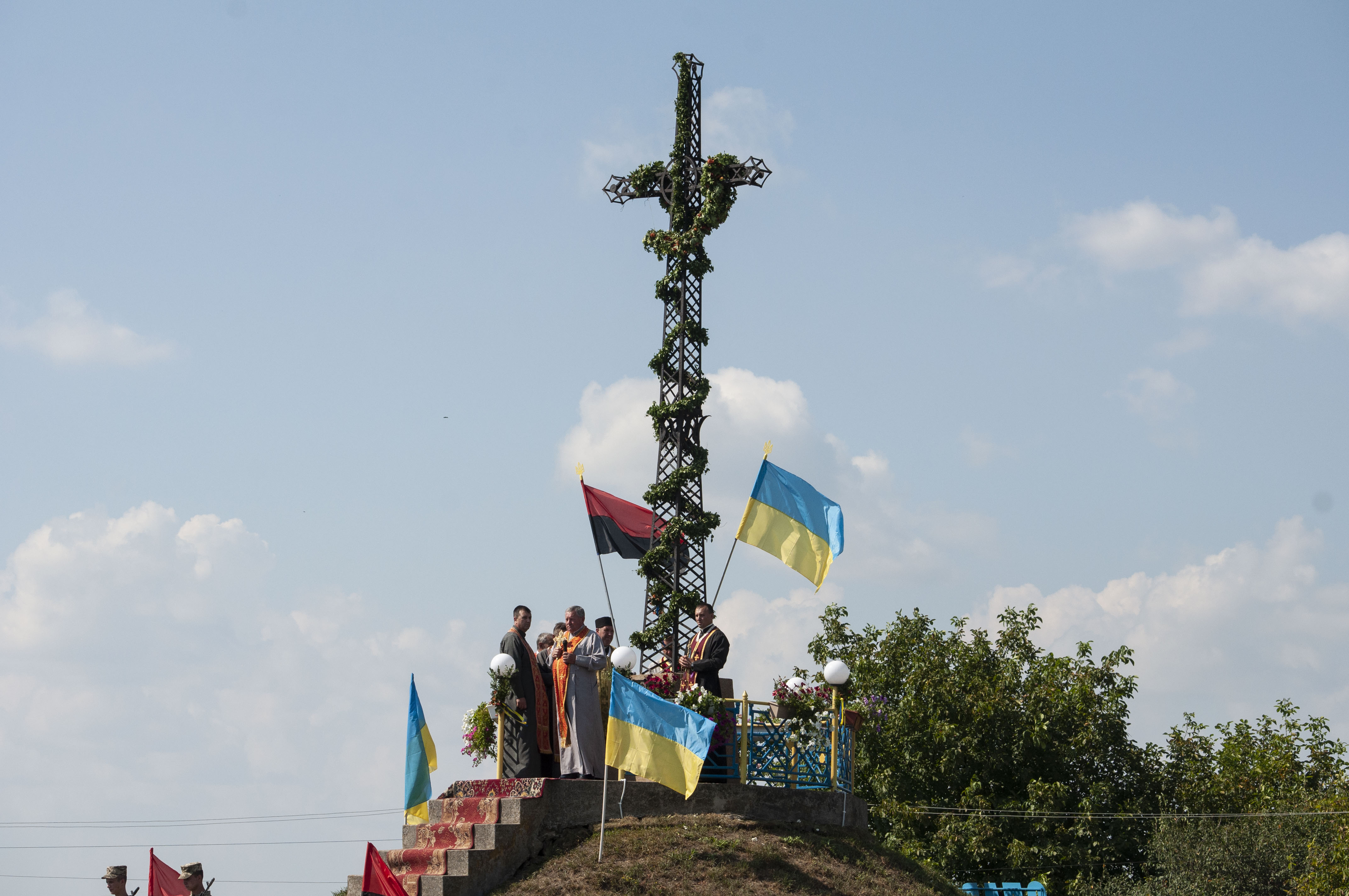
Memorial service

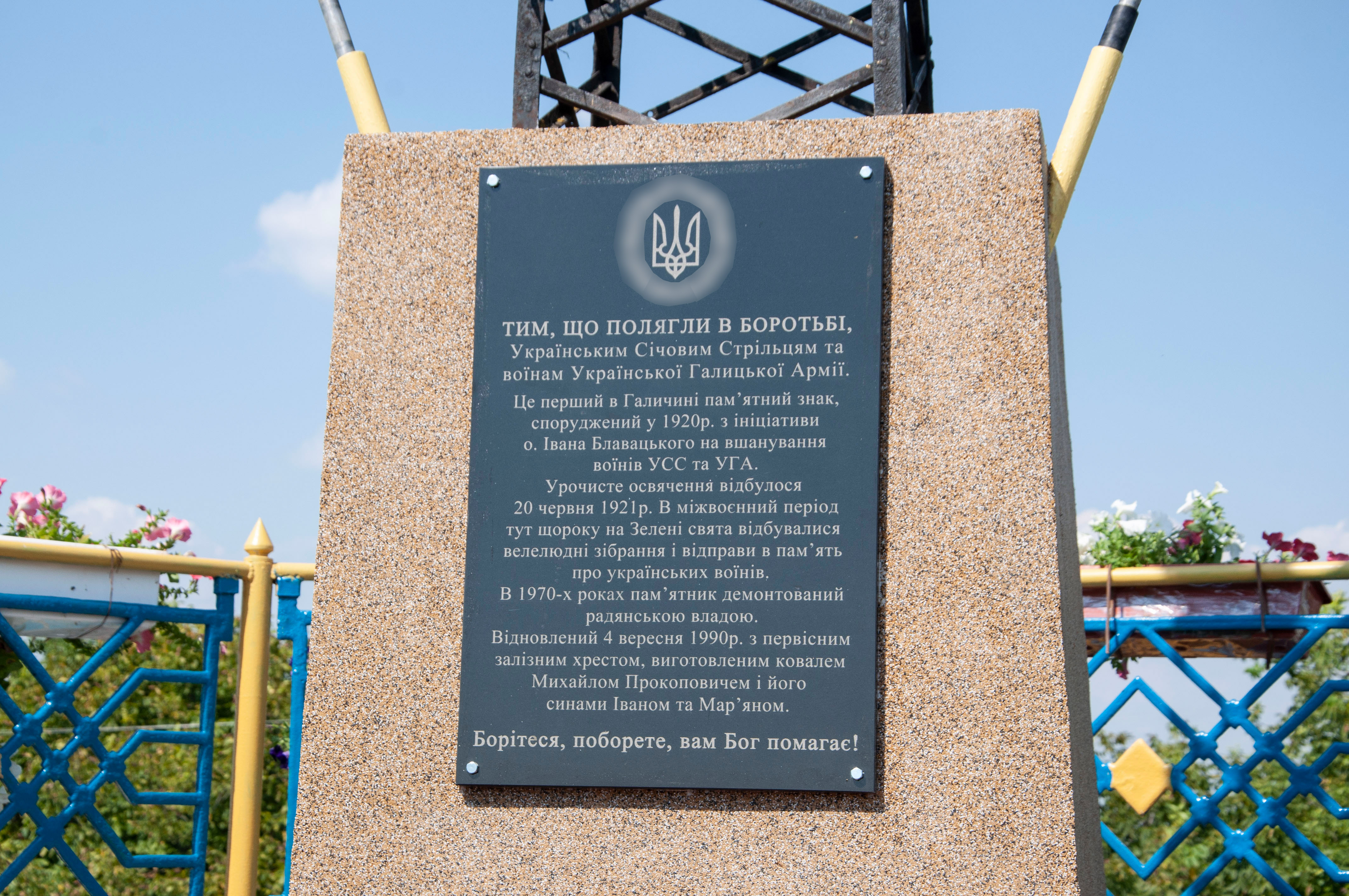
The memorial plaque installed on the grave on the occasion of its 100th anniversary
