= Borys Yavorskyi =

Ukrainian artist (born 1949)

- Борис Яворський
- Born: Borys Albinovych Yavorskyi; 3 October 1949 (age 76); Tovstenke, Ternopil Oblast
- Education: Lviv Institute of Applied and Decorative Arts

Borys Albinovych Yavorskyi (Ukrainian: Борис Альбінович Яворський; born 3 October 1949, Tovstenke, Ternopil Oblast) is a Ukrainian artist. Member of the National Union of Artists of Ukraine (1995).

== Biography ==
Borys Yavorskyi is born on 3 October 1949 in Tovstenke, now Kolyndiany Hromada, Chortkiv Raion, Ternopil Oblast.

He graduated from the Kosiv School of Applied Arts (1969) and the Lviv Institute of Applied and Decorative Arts (1979). He worked as an artist at the art and production workshops of the Mykolaiv Art Fund of Ukraine (1979—1981).

Currently at the Lviv National Academy of Arts: lecturer (1981), senior lecturer (1988) at the Department of Drawing.

Yavorskyi improved his skills in drawing and painting at the Repin Institute of Painting, Sculpture and Architecture in Leningrad (1989—1990; now St. Petersburg, Russia) and in drawing at the National Academy of Visual Arts and Architecture (2011; Kyiv).

He lives in Lviv.

== Creative works ==
Works in easel and monumental painting.

Since 1981, he has participated in Ukrainian and international exhibitions and plein airs.

== Sources ==
- Anna Blazhenko. І пророк у своїй вітцівщині..., Золота пектораль, 2012, № 4, s. 153—154, (Живопис).
