= Mali Pidlisky =

Mali Pidlisky Малі Підліски
- Location in Lviv Oblast
- Coordinates: 49°55′15″N 24°9′34″E
- Country: Ukraine
- Oblast: Lviv Oblast
- Raion: Lviv Raion
- Postal code: 80381

Mali Pidlisky (Ukrainian: Малі Підліски) is a village in Ukraine, Lviv Oblast, Lviv Raion, Lviv urban hromada.

== History ==
Mali Pidlisky (together with Velyki Pidlisky) were first mentioned in 1392, when Pashko (or Jasko) from Jarzyczew received a grant for "Podlesky, Chrzenow, Bliszow, Rudnicze, Zapithow et Dnowo in [districtu] Podhorayensi".

== Famous people ==
- Ivan Blavatskyi (1887-1963), Ukrainian Greek Catholic priest and public figure
- Bohdan Blavatskyi (born 1963) Ukrainian football player, football coach
