= Mykhailo Lozynsky =

Ukrainian diplomat (1880–1937)

Mykhailo Lozynsky Михайло Михайлович Лозинський

Secretary of State of Foreign Affairs of the West Ukrainian People's Republic
- In office 1919–1919
- Preceded by: Lonhyn Tsehelsky
- Succeeded by: Stepan Vytvytskyi

Personal details
- Born: 30 July 1880 Babyn-Saritschnyj, Kalush Raion
- Died: 3 November 1937 (aged 57) Sandarmokh
- Education: University of Lviv

Mykhailo Lozynsky (Ukrainian: Михайло Михайлович Лозинський; 30 July 1880 – 3 November 1937) he was Ukrainian politician, theater critic and diplomat. Secretary of Foreign Affairs of the State Secretariat of the West Ukrainian People's Republic (1919).

== Education ==
Lozynsky was born on 30 July 1880 in Babyn-Saritschnyj, Kalush Raion. In 1893–1899 he studied at the seminary Stanislavsky. In 1900 received a matriculation school in Lviv. He studied law in Lviv, Vienna and Zürich. In 1914, he defended his thesis on the right in Vienna.

He began to publish in 1897 a Social Democratic press in Switzerland. From 1903 he worked as a lawyer and a journalist in Lviv, has worked in a number of publications - "Public voice", "Business" (Lviv), "Council" (Kyiv).

In the years 1907–1914 he lived and worked in Kyiv, Kharkiv, Odesa, Warsaw, Vilnius, Moscow, Saint Petersburg). During World War I he took part in the Union for the Liberation of Ukraine.

He was member of the National Council West Ukrainian People's Republic participated in the Ukrainian delegation to the Paris Peace Conference. From March 1919 he was Deputy Secretary of State for Foreign Affairs of the Government West Ukrainian People's Republic. Also West Ukrainian People's Republic headed the delegation at the talks with Poland.

In 1921–1927 he was in exile in Czechoslovakia professor of International Law and History of Political Thought Ukraine Ukrainian Free University (Prague). He moved to the Ukrainian SSR in 1927, he taught at the Kharkiv Institute of National Economy and the Institute of Marxism, 1928-1930 Chair's Law, Institute of National Economy. Promoted Galicia reunification with Soviet Ukraine.

Arrested on 21 March 1930 in the case of "Ukrainian Military Organization". Judicial Board at triple GPU 23 September 1933 sentenced under Art. c. 04.06.54 Criminal Code to 10 years. He served his sentence in Kem and Solovki, held in spetsizolyatori Savvatevo.

Special NKVD troika of the Leningrad Region 9 October 1937 sentenced to capital punishment. Shot in the Karelian ASSR (Sandarmokh) on 3 November 1937. In 1957, rehabilitated for lack of evidence.

== Author ==
- Krivava knyha - Lozynsky, Mykhalo, 1880-
- The Ukrainian National Question in the Works of Mykhailo Drahomanov - Mykhailo Lozynsky
- The writings and activities of Myhkailo Drahomanov (in Ukrainian) 1915
- Halychyna v zhyttiu Ukraïny - Lozynsky, Mykhalo, 1880-
- Comment les Polonais comprennet leur liberté - Lozynsky, Mykhalo, 1880-
- Halychyna v rr. 1918-1920 - Lozynsky, Mykhalo, 1880-
- Décisions au Conseil suprême sur la Galicie orientale; les plus importants documents avec introd - Lozynsky, Mykhalo, 1880-
- Sorok lït dïial'nosty "Pros'vity" - Lozynsky, Mykhalo, 1880-
