= November Uprising (Lviv, 1918) =

1918 Ukrainian nationalist uprising in Lemberg, Galicia and Lodomeria, Austria-Hungary

- Part of the dissolution of Austria-Hungary, World War I
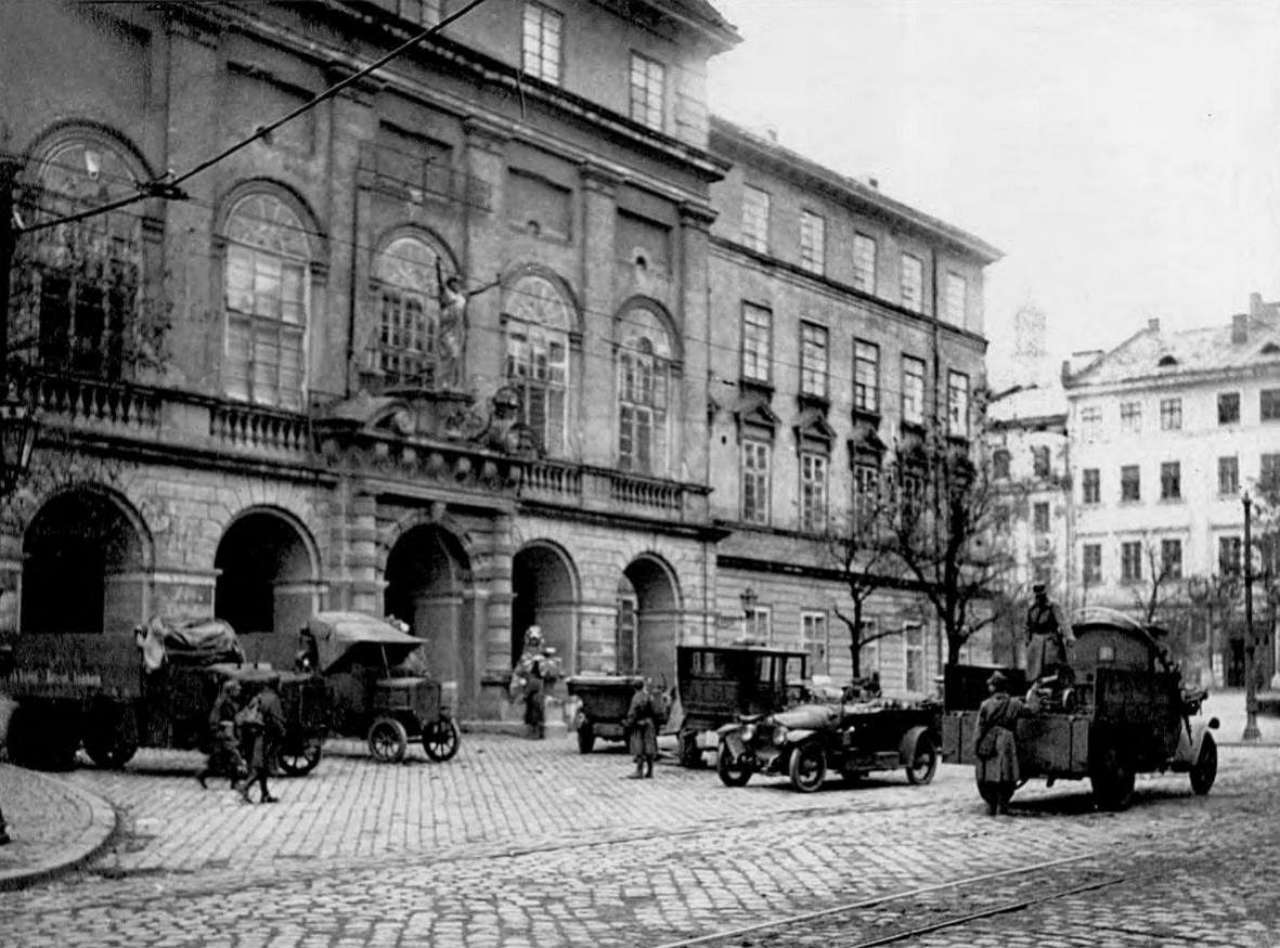
- Ukrainian soldiers loading a machine gun onto a truck during the uprising
- Date: 1 November 1918
- Location: Lemberg, Kingdom of Galicia and Lodomeria, Austria-Hungary (now Lviv, Ukraine)
- Goals: Inclusion of Lemberg into the Ukrainian State
- Result: Declaration of independence of the West Ukrainian People's Republic; Beginning of the Polish-Ukrainian War

Parties
West Ukrainian People's Republic	Austria-Hungary

Lead figures
(West Ukrainian People's Republic) Kost Levytsky; (West Ukrainian People's Republic) Dmytro Vitovsky	Karl Georg Huyn (surrendered)

Number
Unknown	1,460

The November Uprising in Lviv (Ukrainian: Листопадовий чин, romanized: Lystopadovyi chyn) was a coordinated Ukrainian military operation carried out in Lviv on 1 November 1918, during the dissolution of Austria-Hungary. Organized by the Ukrainian Military Committee under Dmytro Vitovsky, the operation aimed to establish Ukrainian control over the city and facilitate the creation of an independent Ukrainian state in Eastern Galicia.

In the early hours of 1 November, Ukrainian soldiers serving in the Austro-Hungarian garrison occupied government buildings, military installations and other strategic locations, largely without bloodshed. The takeover was undertaken on behalf of the Ukrainian National Rada, which had proclaimed the establishment of a Ukrainian state in October 1918. The operation preceded the anticipated arrival in Lviv of the Polish Liquidation Commission, which sought to transfer Galicia to the emerging Polish state.

The Ukrainian takeover met with armed resistance from the city's predominantly Polish population, leading to street fighting and the outbreak of the Polish–Ukrainian War. Although Ukrainian forces initially secured most of Lviv, they were unable to suppress Polish resistance. Following the arrival of Polish reinforcements, Ukrainian troops withdrew from the city during the night of 21–22 November 1918. The events also marked the beginning of the establishment of the West Ukrainian People's Republic, formally constituted later that month.

== Background ==
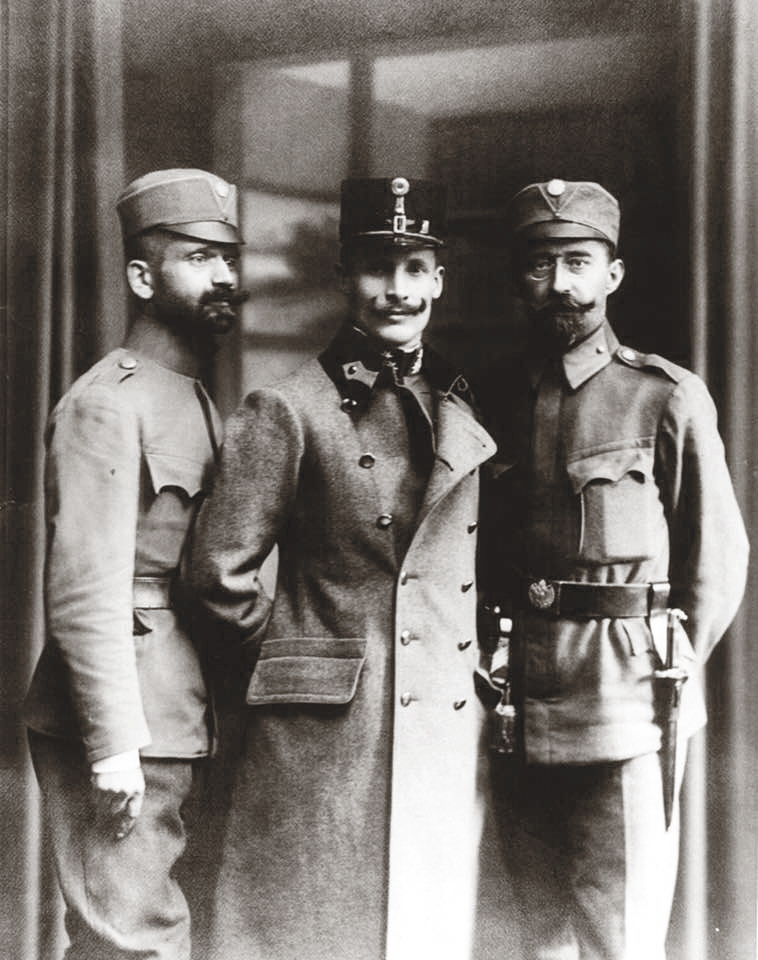
Uprising leaders Ivan Boberskyi, Dmytro Vitovsky, and Lonhyn Tsehelsky in 1918

Amidst the dissolution of Austria-Hungary, the ethnically diverse eastern portions of Galicia became a sticking point between ethnic Ukrainians and Poles. Prior to the uprising, the Ukrainian National Council was established on 18 October 1918. The Council sought Austro-Hungarian support in establishing a Ukrainian administration within Austria-Hungary, and formally declared itself as such on 20 October 1918 with the blessing of Ukrainian Greek Catholic Metropolitan Andrey Sheptytsky. However, facing the refusal of viceroy Karl Georg Huyn to surrender without the permission of Emperor Charles I, it was determined instead to launch a revolt and establish an independent state.

The Polish Liquidation Committee, established the same month, was created with the support of the Allies, and sought to annex all of Galicia into an independent Polish state. With the city of Lemberg being primarily Polish, Ukrainian organisers invited Dmytro Vitovsky, a centurion of the Ukrainian Sich Riflemen, to help coordinate the uprising. Originally planned for 3 November 1918, the Liquidation Committee's announcement that it intended to move its base of operations to Lemberg greatly hastened matters, with Vitovsky emotionally declaring before the council on 31 October 1918, "If we do not take Lviv tonight, then the Poles will take it tomorrow."

== Uprising ==
At 4:00 on 1 November, the uprising was launched, as Teodor Martynets disarmed the 41st Infantry Division of the Common Army. Next, the city's Szymon Konarski School was seized. Present at the school was a detachment of Hungarian soldiers, who declared their neutrality. The police station, seized next, also refused to take sides in the uprising. Finally, at 6:00, the town hall was seized, and the flag of Ukraine was raised. As no flag had been sewn before the uprising, Mariia Lazorko, Vitovsky's wife, made one from fabrics found in the trades building. According to popular legend, there was no yellow fabric, so the yellow field was instead made from white fabric dyed with saffron.

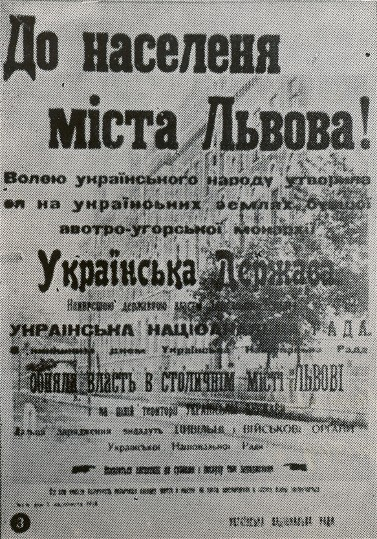
Proclamation of the November Uprising in Lviv

By 7:00, the city had been taken over without bloodshed, including the Diet of Galicia and Lodomeria and the Magistrate's Office. That day, power was formally transferred from Austria-Hungary to the Ukrainians in a ceremony. Representing the Austro-Hungarians was Volodymyr Detsykevych, as Huyn stepped down from his position so as to avoid working without the orders of Emperor Charles. The control of a Ukrainian state was de jure established, stretching from the San to Bukovina. Other cities throughout eastern Galicia, such as Stanislaviv, voluntarily chose to come under the control of the Ukrainian National Council at this time. At that time, the West Ukrainian People's Republic was formally established.

== Aftermath and legacy ==
Fighting between Polish and Ukrainian volunteers began shortly after the uprising. In the city's Rome Coffee Shop, located on 25 Academic Street, a Ukrainian soldier was beaten to near-death by Poles. In response, Ukrainians threw a grenade into the coffee shop. These events marked the beginning of the Battle of Lemberg, itself the start of the Polish–Ukrainian War.

The November Uprising continues to be celebrated in Lviv in the present day, with historical reenactments of the uprising occurring on 1 November in the city. Throughout Ukrainian Galicia, November Uprising Day has been a popular holiday in the city since the early 1920s. A monument also exists on Horodotska Street. Nationalist and far-right groups are organizing their own march: Trizub, Galician Youth, Right-Wing Youth, Centuria (youth organisation of Azov), the Veterans’ Corps, and the Right Sector.
