= Tovstenke =

Tovstenke Товстеньке
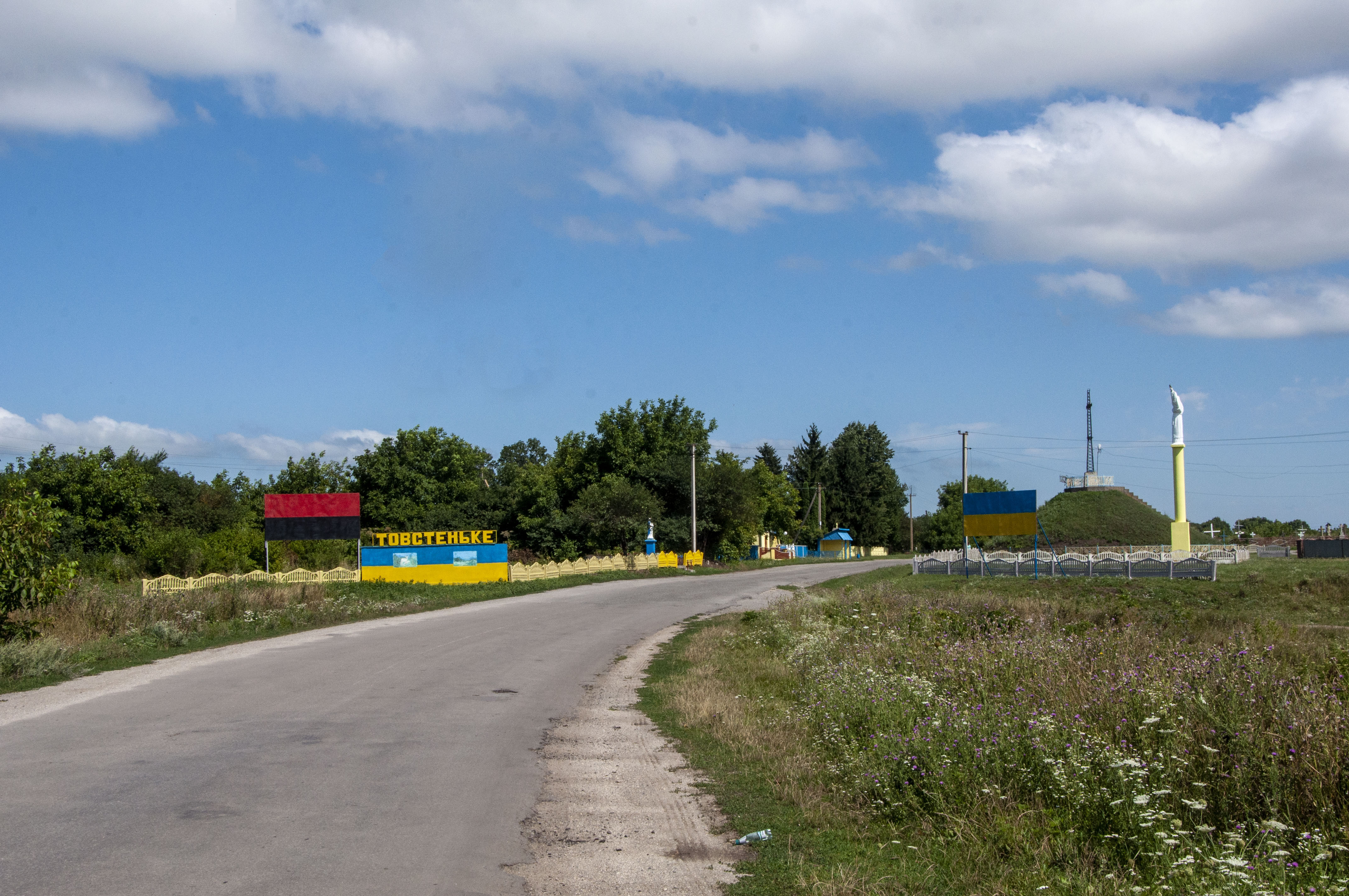

- Location in Ternopil Oblast Tovstenke (Ukraine)
- Coordinates: 49°1′11″N 26°3′46″E
- Country: Ukraine
- Oblast: Ternopil Oblast
- Raion: Chortkiv Raion
- Postal code: 48521

Tovstenke (Ukrainian: Товстеньке) is a village in Ukraine, Ternopil Oblast, Chortkiv Raion, Kolyndiany rural hromada.

== Notable locations ==
=== Churches ===
- Church of the Holy Trinity (1846; UGCC; stone)
- Church of the Sacred Heart of Jesus (built in the beginning of the XIX century, functioned until 1946)

There are two chapels in the village (1991, 1998).

=== Monuments ===
In 1921, on the initiative of оf Ivan Blavatskyi, the first symbolic grave of the fighters for freedom of Ukraine was built; it was restored in 1990.

Monuments were erected to the soldiers-fellow villagers who died in the German-Soviet war, and to Ivan Franko (2004).

Figures of the Mother of God (1864) and crosses in honor of the 50th anniversary of the abolition of serfdom (1848) were installed.

== Notable residents ==
- Yaroslav Bilynskyi (pseudonym "Bystryi", 1921–1946), OUN and UPA activist
- Antin Borsa (1905-1997), Ukrainian priest and educator
- Sydir (Isydor) Holubovych (1875-1938), Ukrainian lawyer, public and political figure
- Taras Demkura (born 1964), Ukrainian entrepreneur, philanthropist, collector, publisher
- Roman Kolisnyk (born 1923) - Ukrainian writer, journalist, manager in Canada
- Yevstakhii Romaniuk (born 1952), Ukrainian doctor, public figure
- Borys Yavorskyi (born 1949), Ukrainian artist
- Franciszek Horodyski (1871-1935), Polish painter

== Sources ==
- (in Ukrainian) Качмарський Б., Уніят В., Товстеньке // Ternopil Encyclopedic Dictionary: in 4 v. / editorial board: H. Yavorskyi and other, Ternopil: "Zbruch", 2008, V. 3: П—Я, S. 456. — ISBN 978-966-528-279-2.
- (in Ukrainian) Карпович В., Федечко М., Щавінський В., Товстеньке // Ternopil Oblast. History of cities and villages: in 3 v. / Ternopil: "Terno-graph", 2014, V. 3: М—Ш, S. 512—513. — ISBN 978-966-457-246-7.
- "Tłusteńkie". Geographical Dictionary of the Kingdom of Poland (in Polish). 12. Warszawa: Kasa im. Józefa Mianowskiego. 1892. p. 353.
