= Polivtsi, Ternopil Oblast =

Rural locality in Ternopil Oblast, Ukraine

Polivtsi Полівці
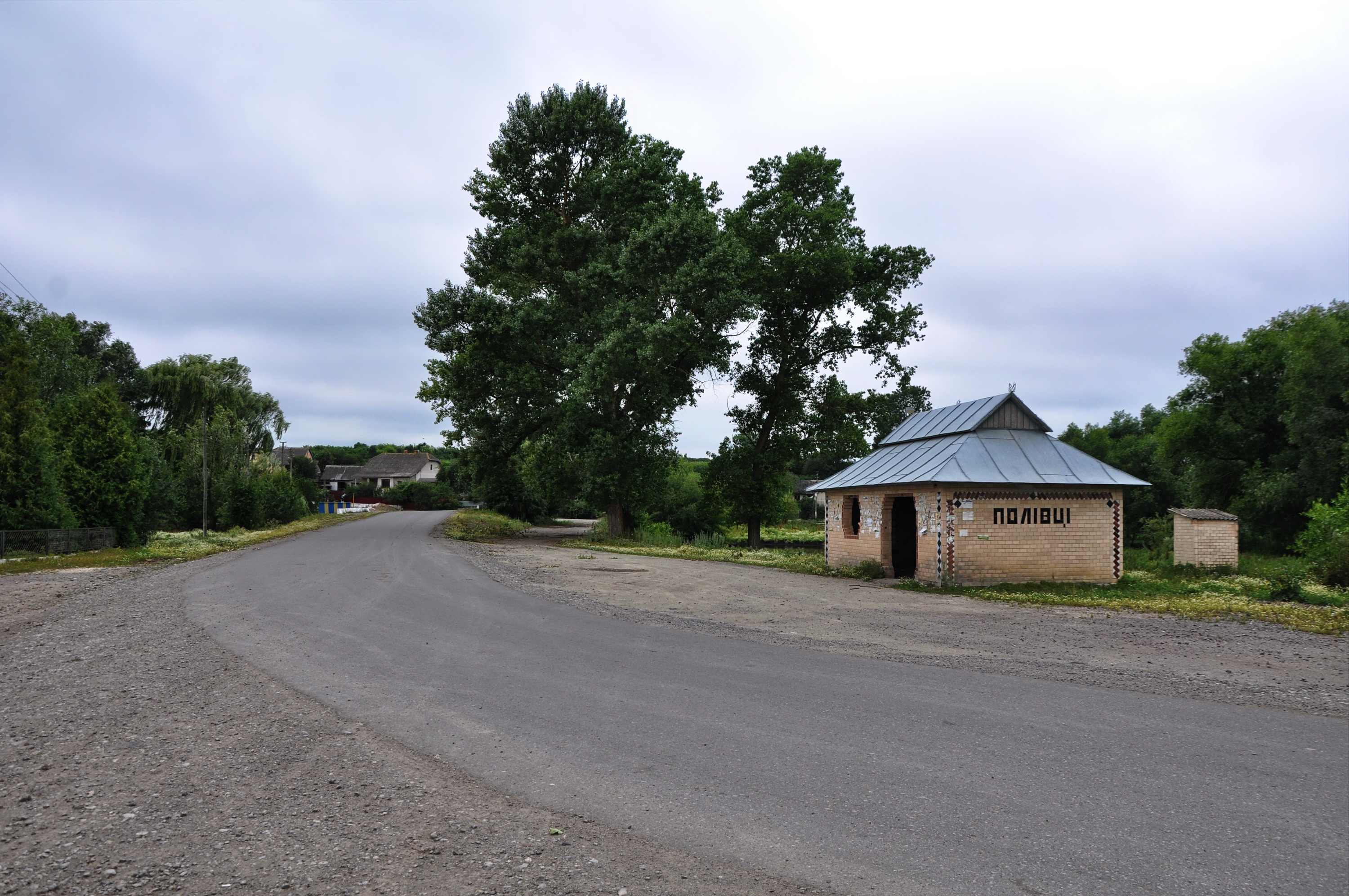

- Location in Ternopil Oblast
- Coordinates: 49°0′18″N 25°34′48″E
- Country: Ukraine
- Oblast: Ternopil Oblast
- Raion: Chortkiv Raion
- Hromada: Bilobozhnytsia Hromada
- Time zone: UTC+2 (EET)
  - Summer (DST): UTC+3 (EEST)
- Postal code: 48531

Polivtsi (Ukrainian: Полівці; Polish: Połowce) is a village in Bilobozhnytsia rural hromada, Chortkiv Raion, Ternopil Oblast, Ukraine.

== History ==
The first written mention dates from 1536.

== Religion ==
- Saint Nicholas church (OCU, 1884)
- Saint Nicholas church (UGCC, converted from the RCC church in 2000)

== People ==
- Myroslav Motiuk (born 1950), Ukrainian doctor, lawyer, businessman, public figure
- Isydor Nahaievskyi (1908-1989), participant of the national liberation struggle, leading specialist in the manufacture of missile weapons in the US Department of Defense, dean of New York University, author of scientific works
- Vasyl Pohoretskyi (born 1954), Ukrainian publicist, writer, Doctor of Theology and Candidate of Historical Sciences
- Volodymyr Pohoretskyi (born 1967), Ukrainian writer, editor, public figure
- Nestor Chyr (1938–2014), Ukrainian poet, publicist, oilman (resettled in 1945 with his family to Ternopil Oblast during the deportation of Ukrainians from Poland and Poles from Ukraine)
