= Ivan Blavatskyi =

Ukrainian Greek Catholic priest and public figure

- Іван Блаватський
- Born: 8 March 1887; Mali Pidlisky, Austria-Hungary (now Lviv Hromada, Lviv Raion, Lviv Oblast, Ukraine)
- Died: 19 April 1963 (aged 76); Baltimore, Maryland, U.S.

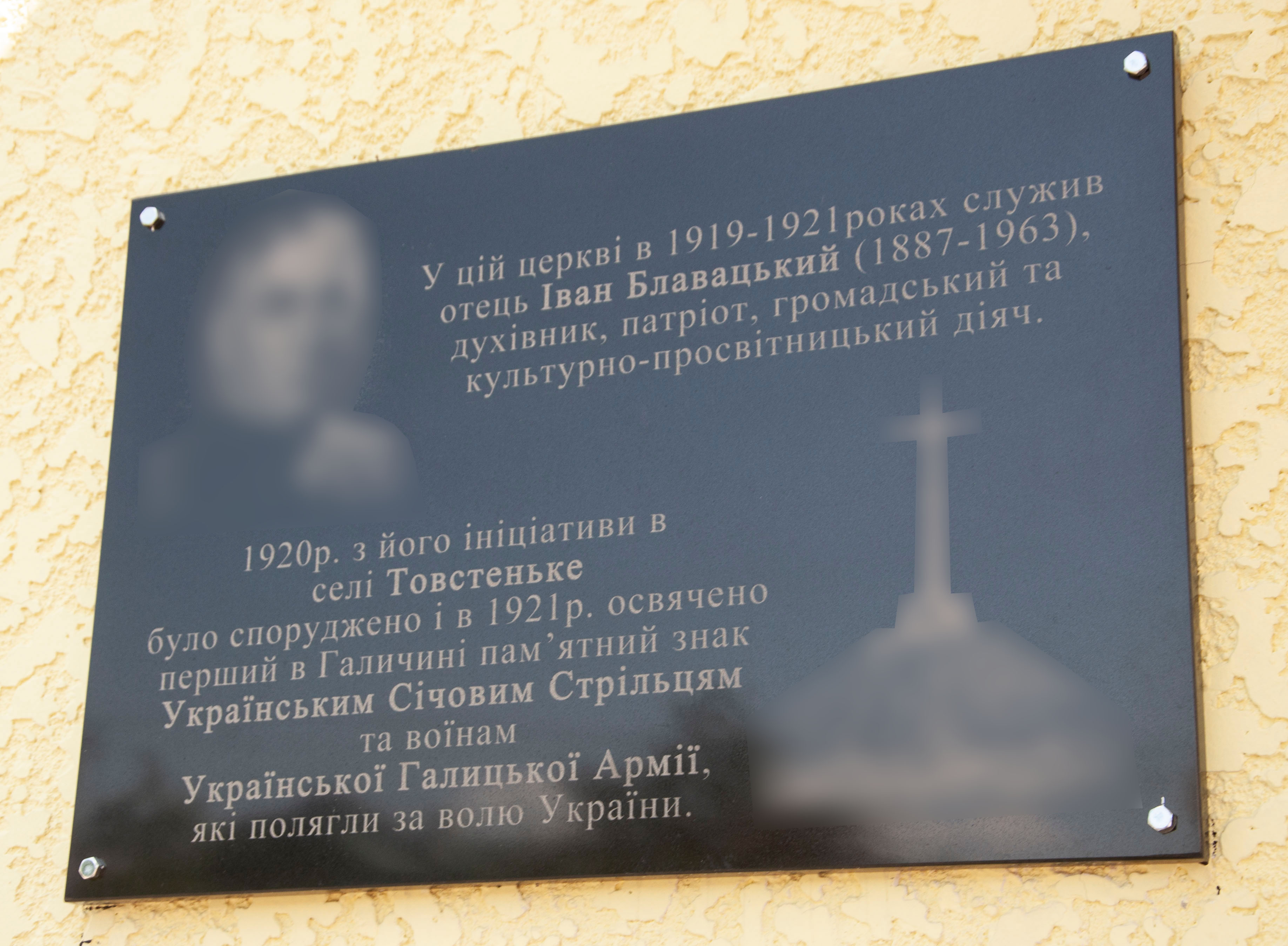
A memorial plaque to Ivan Blavatskyi on the facade of the Church of the Holy Trinity in Tovstenke, where he served in 1919–1921.

Ivan Vasylovych Blavatskyi (Ukrainian: Іван Васильович Блавацький, 8 March 1887 – 19 April 1963) was a Ukrainian Greek Catholic priest and public figure.

== Biography ==
Ivan Blavatskyi was born on 8 March 1887, in the village of Mali Pidlisky, now the Lviv Hromada, Lviv Raion, Lviv Oblast, Ukraine.

He graduated from the Lviv Theological Seminary of the Holy Spirit and University. He was ordained by Bishop Hryhorii Khomyshyn on 24 March 1918, in the Chapel of the Theological Seminary in Stanyslaviv. He served in the villages: Tovstenke of the Husiatyn Deanery (1919–1921), Bobulintsi of the Chortkiv Deanery (1922–1923), Myluvannia (1923–1931) and Roshniv (1928–1929) of the Yezupil Deanery, Khryplyn (1931–[1938], administrator) and Opryshivtsi (1938–1944) of the Stanyslaviv Deanery.

In 1920, together with like-minded people, he initiated the construction of the first symbolic grave in Galicia in Tovstenke, Chortkiv Raion, in memory of those who died in World War I.

In Stanyslaviv, he was a referent of the Bishop's Consistory, a catechist at the gymnasiums of the Trade and Native Schools, and the second city dean of the Stanyslaviv Deanery (1938).

In 1939–1941, he was persecuted by the Communists. With the advent of the German occupation, he and his parishioners held a memorial service for the prisoners who were shot by the NKVD in the Stanyslaviv prison. In July 1941, in honor of the fallen, he initiated the filling of the grave of the Fighters for the Freedom of Ukraine in Opryshivtsi.

In 1944, together with his family, he moved to Western Europe, where he was a parish priest in the cities of Flintsbach (1946-1948) and Rosenheim (1948-1949). Since 1950 he has been in the United States. He served in various Ukrainian parishes, in particular in the cities of Gethsemane (1950-1951), Philadelphia ([1952], 1959-1960[1]), Clifton Heights (1960-1962[1]).

He died on 19 April 1963, in Baltimore (USA). He is buried at St. Mary Ukrainian Catholic Cemetery in the suburb of Fox Chase, Philadelphia.

=== Family ===
He was married, his wife was Olena. He raised two daughters, Lidiia and Dariia.

=== Memorial ===
In 2021, at the initiative of local historian Yukhym Makoterskyi, a memorial plaque to Ivan Blavatskyi was installed on the facade of the Church of the Holy Trinity in Tovstenke.

A street in Opryshivtsi was named after Ivan Blavatskyi.
