= Bohdan Blavatskyi =

Soviet Ukrainian footballer

Personal information
- Full name: Bohdan Ihorovych Blavatskyi
- Date of birth: 7 June 1963 (age 63)
- Place of birth: Mali Pidlisky, Lviv Oblast, Ukrainian SSR
- Position: Striker

Youth career
- 1974–1981: Karpaty Lviv

Senior career*
Years	Team	Apps	(Gls)
1992	Sokil Lviv	0	(0)

Managerial career
- 1994–1997: Haray Zhovkva
- 1998: Prykarpattia Ivano-Frankivsk
- 1999: Podillya Khmelnytskyi
- 2000–2003: Krasyliv
- 2003–2004: Spartak Ivano-Frankivsk
- 2004–2005: Metalurh-2 Zaporizhzhia
- 2005–2006: Obolon Kyiv
- 2007–2008: Podillya Khmelnytskyi
- 2008–2009: Nyva Vinnytsia
- 2009–2010: Spartakus Szarowola
- 2010–2011: Motor Lublin
- 2011: Enerhetyk Burshtyn
- 2012–2013: Tomasovia Tomaszów Lubelski
- 2013–2014: Volyn Lutsk (assistant)
- 2013–2014: Volyn Lutsk (youth assistant)
- 2014–2016: Wisła Puławy
- 2017: Stal Rzeszów
- 2017–2018: Wisła Puławy
- 2019: Lviv
- 2019–2020: Stal Kraśnik
- 2021: Uzhhorod (assistant)
- 2021–2022: Uzhhorod
- 2022–2024: Tomasovia Tomaszów Lubelski
- * Club domestic league appearances and goals

Bohdan Blavatskyi (Ukrainian: Богдан Ігорович Блавацький; born 7 June 1963) is a Ukrainian professional football manager and former player who played as a forward.

== Coaching career ==
Blavatskyi started his coaching career in 1994 taking charge of FC Harai Zhovkva. In 1995, he won the Ukrainian Amateur League with this club. In 1998, Bohdan became the head coach of Ukrainian Premier League club, Prykarpattya Ivano-Frankivsk.

From 1999 to 2000, Blavatskyi managed Podillya Khmelnytskyi. From 2000 to2003, he was in charge of FC Krasyliv, which finished first in the Ukrainian Second League under his leadership and were promoted to the Ukrainian First League. In the 2003–04 campaign, he was in charge of Spartak Ivano-Frankivsk. In the 2004–05 season, he was the coach of Metalurh-2 Zaporizhzhia, and in 2005–06 he was the coach of Obolon Kyiv.

Blavatskyi was the coach of FC Podillya-Khmelnytskyi in its debuting 2007–08 season. After finishing 3rd, Blavatskyi left to PFC Nyva Vinnytsia.

== Honours ==
=== Managerial ===
Stal Rzeszów

- Polish Cup (Subcarpathia regionals): 2016–17
- Polish Cup (Rzeszów-Dębica regionals): 2016–17
