= Yevhen Petrushevych =

Ukrainian politician (1863–1940)

- Євген Петрушевич
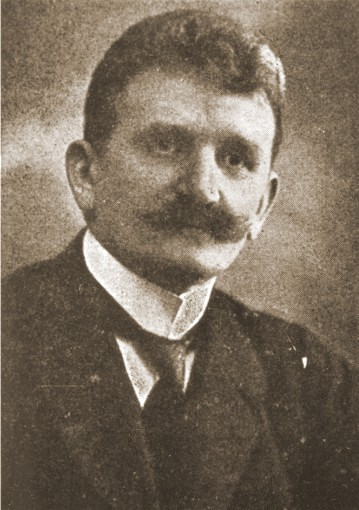
- Petrushevych in 1918

President of the West Ukrainian People's Republic
- In office 18 October 1918 – November 1919
- Preceded by: Position established
- Succeeded by: Position abolished Volodymyr Vynnychenko as head of the Directorate of Ukraine

Personal details
- Born: 3 June 1863 Busk, Kingdom of Galicia and Lodomeria, Austrian Empire (now Busk, Zolochiv Raion, Lviv Oblast, Ukraine)
- Died: 29 August 1940 (aged 77) Berlin, Nazi Germany
- Resting place: Lychakiv Cemetery, Lviv

Yevhen Omelianovych Petrushevych (Ukrainian: Євге́н Омеля́нович Петруше́вич; 3 June 1863 – 29 August 1940) was a Ukrainian lawyer, politician, and president of the West Ukrainian People's Republic formed after the collapse of the Austro-Hungarian Empire in 1918.

== Early life and education ==
He was born on 3 June 1863, in the town of Busk, of Galicia into the family of an Eastern Catholic priest of noble background. After graduating from the Lviv Academic Gymnasium he studied law at the Lviv University, where he was one of the leaders of the student movement and headed the Academic Fraternity. After earning a doctorate in law, he started a practice in Sokal. He was regarded with favor by the people because of his professionalism in defending them from the self-will of powers. At the same time he headed the district Prosvita educational society and was an organizer of the cultural and educational life. He became an active member of Ukrainian National Democratic Party formed in 1899.

== Political career ==
In 1907, Yevhen Petrushevych was elected to the Imperial Council of Cisleithania (Reichsrat). He became one of the leaders and then a head of Ukrainian Parliament Club. In 1910 he was elected to the Galician Sejm in Lviv from the Stryi district. Being a leading figure of the Ukrainian Sejm Club, he headed the determined fight for a new election law and achieved the increase of the quota of Ukrainian mandates in the Sejm from 12 to 34, and then to 62.

During World War I as head of the Ukrainian parliamentary delegation, he struggled against the plans of Galicia annexation by Poland and was an adherent of the territory autonomy within Austria. Being the head of the Galician delegation in Brest-Litovsk in February 1918, he favoured the introduction of Austria’s liability of granting autonomy to Galicia into the secret appendix of the International conference resolution. Jointly with Czech and Slovak parliamentarians he worked out a project about the formation of national states united with Austria on the Empires lands and submitted it for the Kaiser's consideration. The manifest of Emperor Charles I of Austria on 18 October 1918 proclaimed the right of peoples to self-determination.

On 19 October, the representative Ukrainian Constituent in Lviv approved the resolution on formation of the independent Ukrainian State in the western ethnic territory. To implement the resolution they elected the Ukrainian National Rada (Council); Yevhen Petrushevych became its president. Being an adherent of the peaceful power transfer to Ukrainians he carried out negotiations with officials in Vienna. But in connection with the threat on the part of Poles, Lviv delegation of the National Council headed by Kost Levytsky seized power under arms and on 1 November proclaimed the formation of the West Ukrainian People's Republic (WUPR). Levytsky's government was formed on 9 November and started the construction of the national state.

After the outbreak of the Polish-Ukrainian War and a defeat at Lviv, the WUPR government remained in Stanislaviv (now Ivano-Frankivsk). Being the president of the National Council, Petrushevych mainly performed representative functions, but owing to his political culture and parliamentary experience he had influence on making the most important decisions in the state. The National Council elaborated a number of necessary laws, which regulated the socio-political and economic life, laid the legal foundation of the state and guarded it from acute social conflicts and destructive manifestations.

On 9 June 1919 by decision of the top state authorities, Petrushevych was granted the title of authorized dictator (in Zalishchyky), which meant that he acted both as a president and a head of the government. When in July 1919 the Galician army retreated over the Zbruch into the Ukrainian People's Republic, the WUPR government settled in Kamianets-Podilskyi. The relations between Petrushevych and the chairman of Directory Symon Petliura deteriorated during this period, and Petrushevych was dismissed from the Directory for his opposition to the Ukrainian-Polish alliance. In autumn 1919 Petrushevych left for Vienna, where the exile government continued its diplomatic activity for the restoration of ZUNR independence. The president sent Ukrainian delegations to international talks in Riga and Geneva, sent notes and messages in the address of the League of Nations, got a resolution, which recommended a Council of Ambassadors in Paris to review the Galician problem. With the aim to determine the aspirations of Ukrainians he elaborated a fundamental draft of the Constitution of Ukrainian Galician Republic. In 1922 Petrushevych headed Ukrainian delegation to Geneva where the international conference took place.

But on 15 March 1923, the Council of Ambassadors approved a resolution according to which the West Ukrainian lands were annexed by Poland without reservation.

After the liquidation of the exile government, Petrushevych continued diplomatic and patriotic actions in defense of the oppressed Ukrainian Galician people, spread notes and protests, and continued publishing the ZUNR organ, Ukrainsky prapor (Ukrainian Banner). As a result of his disappointment over the March decision he adopted an openly Sovietophile position. He maintained contacts with the Soviet representatives in Vienna and Berlin, where he had moved in 1923. In 1923 the Politburo of the All-Union Communist Party decided in favour of funding Petrushevych's activities, and two years later the Ukrainian Politburo made a similar decision. Petrushevych continued receiving financial support at least until the end of the 1920s.

== Later life, death and legacy ==
In spite of the emigrant's life difficulties, in old age he collaborated with the Ukrainian National Association, maintained relations with Hetman Pavlo Skoropadsky.

Petrushevych died on 29 August 1940 and was buried at Berlin cemetery of St. Hedwig's Cathedral.

On 1 November 2002, the remains of Yevhen Petrushevych were reburied at the Lychakiv Cemetery in Lviv on the initiative of Yuriy Ferentsevych.
