= Ukrainian National Council =

1918 legislative body

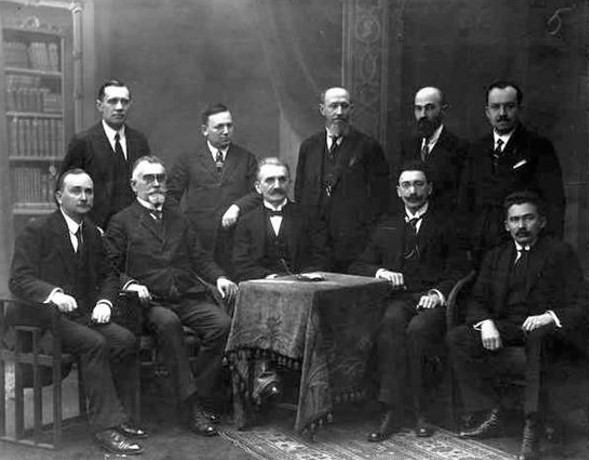
The Ukrainian National Council with Yevhen Petrushevych, 1918

Ukrainian National Council of West Ukrainian People's Republic (UNRada, Ukrainian: Українська Національна Рада Західно-Української Народної Республіки, romanized: Ukrainska Natsionalna Rada Zakhidno-Ukrainskoi Narodnoi Respubliky, until 13 November 1918 Ukrainian National Council – the representative body of Ukrainians of the former Austro-Hungarian empire) – was the supreme legislative body of the West Ukrainian People's Republic (ZUNR).

== History ==
=== Ukrainian National Council as representative body ===
On 18 October 1918 the Ukrainian National Council was established in Lemberg as the representative body of Ukrainians of the Austro-Hungarian monarchy. On 18–19, October 1918 UNC convened a konstytuanta – a representative assembly of around 500 people – in Lemberg's People's House (Ukrainian: Народний Дім) for the implementation of the right to self-determination of the Ukrainian territories within the Austro-Hungarian empire, which was disintegrating.

On 19 October 1918 the Ukrainian National Council proclaimed the independence of Ukrainian lands in the former Austro-Hungarian Empire as West Ukrainian People's Republic (ZUNR). Lemberg, now known as Lviv, the largest city in Galicia, was declared the capital of ZUNR.

The first chair of the council was Kost Levytsky.

=== Ukrainian National Council as the parliament of the ZUNR ===
The Ukrainian National Council of ZUNR consisted of all Ukrainian members both chambers of the Austrian Imperial Council (House of Deputies and House of Lords), regional Diet of Galicia and the Diet of Bukovina, representatives of the episcopate, and three representatives of the major Ukrainian party of these lands. In addition, famous non-party experts and youth representatives, were co-opted. After the selection of representatives for povits (counties) and cities, and for establishment national minorities who had not used this right, the whole Council had 150 members. The body had been planned to have 226 members, with seats allocated in proportion to each group's percentage of the total number of citizens (Ukrainian – 160, Poles – 33, Jews – 27, Germans – 6).

UNRada had the legislative competence of a parliament and controlled the ZUNR, before the creation of the State Secretariat as a government. The UNRada plenum elected a permanent body, named UNRada Board (Ukrainian: Виділ, romanized: Vydil; highest permanent in the state) and President of the Council; served as head of state law (approved government has the right to amnesty and abolitsiyi, appointed Heads of state governments proclaimed laws Council); Resolution fre-majority.

The party composition to UNRada Board included 6 representatives of UNDP, 2 of Social Democrats and 2 Radicals (Lev Bachynskyi and Hryts Duvirak) who had the opportunity to appoint senior executives of state bodies to pass laws and take part in the approval of the government, which was formed on 4 February 1919. The new government of the Republic was headed by Sydir Holubovych, who at the same time became secretary of finance, trade and industry.

Before the transfer of power ZUNR and UGA for Zbruch UNRada Board and the State Secretariat joint resolution of 9 June 1919 temporarily handed over his constitutional powers of the President Yevhen Petrushevych as "authorized dictator" who had full military and civilian executive to convene the UNRada plenum.

== Sources ==
- Russia And Ukraine by Myroslav Shkandrij
- (in Ukrainian) Литвин М., Науменко К. Історія ЗУНР.— Львів: Інститут українознавства НАНУ, видавнича фірма "Олір", 1995.— 368 с., іл. ISBN 5-7707-7867-9
