= Sydir Holubovych =

Ukrainian politician

- Сидір Голубович
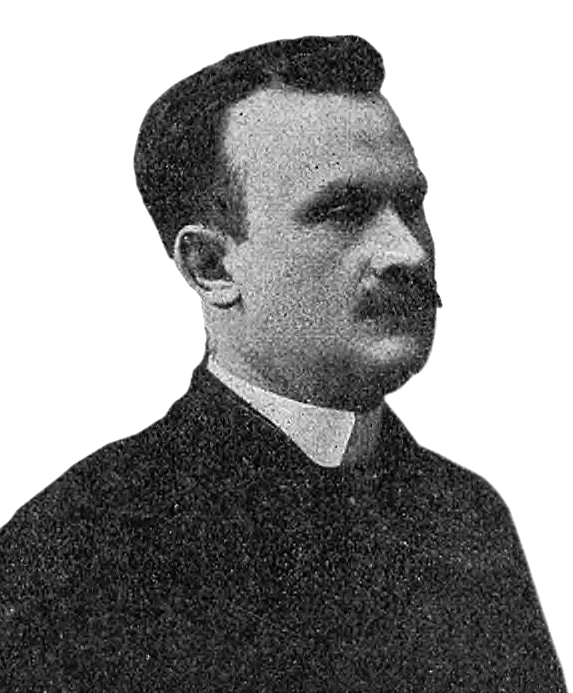

Head of the Council of State Secretaries of West Ukrainian People's Republic (ZUNR)
- In office 4 January 1919 – 9 June 1919
- President: Yevhen Petrushevych
- Preceded by: Kost Levytsky
- Succeeded by: position abolished

State Secretary of Finance, Trade, and Industry of the West Ukrainian People's Republic
- In office 4 January 1919 – 9 June 1919
- Prime Minister: Himself
- Preceded by: post created
- Succeeded by: position abolished

State Secretary of Justice of the West Ukrainian People's Republic
- In office 9 November 1918 – 4 January 1919
- Prime Minister: Kost Levytsky
- Preceded by: post created
- Succeeded by: position reorganized

Deputy to Imperial Council
- In office 1911–1918

Deputy to the Galician Diet
- In office 1913–1913

Head of the Ukrainian People's Labour Party
- In office 1924–1925
- Preceded by: ?
- Succeeded by: position abolished

Personal details
- Born: March 6, 1873 Tovstenke, Chortkiv Bezirk, Kingdom of Galicia and Lodomeria, Austria-Hungary (now Ternopil Oblast, Ukraine)
- Died: January 12, 1938 (aged 64) Lwów, Lwów Voivodeship, Second Polish Republic (now Lviv, Lviv Oblast, Ukraine)
- Resting place: Lychakiv Cemetery
- Party: Ukrainian National Democratic Party; Ukrainian People's Labour Party
- Education: Lviv University
- Occupation: Lawyer, politician

Sydir Holubovych (Ukrainian: Сидір Голубович; 6 March 1873 - 12 January 1938) was a Ukrainian politician and lawyer who most notably served Head of the Council of State Secretaries of West Ukrainian People's Republic (ZUNR) under Yevhen Petrushevych, which was equivalent to the post of Prime Minister, from 4 January to 9 June 1919. During the ZUNR, he also was State Secretary of Justice and State Secretary of Finance, Trade, and Industry, both of which were equivalent to ministry positions. Prior to the establishment of ZUNR, he served as a deputy both to the Imperial Council and Galician Diet.

== Early life ==
Holubovych was born on 6 March 1873 in Tovstenke, which was then part of the Chortkiv Bezirk within the Kingdom of Galicia and Lodomeria, Austria-Hungary. In 1897, he completed his core studies of law at Lviv University. During these years, he first became politically active, joining the student society "Akademichna Hromada", which he eventually headed, and publishing for a series entitled Svitova Biblioteka. He then returned to his alma mater, and achieved his Doctor of Law from the university in 1902.

Upon graduating, he worked as a lawyer. He first worked within Ternopil, before in 1905 opened his own law office in Ternopil. He was part of the defense council for Myroslav Sichynsky, who in 1908 assassinated the Governor of the Kingdom of Galicia and Lodomeria, Andrzej Kazimierz Potocki, in retaliation for the killing of Ukrainian peasants in Galicia. He also, in 1911, represented Ukrainian students who protested against the authorities refusal to establish a Ukrainian university. Simultaneously, he also participated in local societies. From 1904 to 1914 he headed the Ternopil branch of Prosvita in conjunction with leading the county-level Sokol society, and also the association Podilska Rada and the Ukrainian newspaper Podilskyi Holos.

== Political career ==
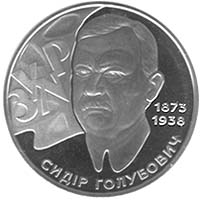
A coin of the National Bank of Ukraine from 2008 commemorating Holubovych

He became a member of Austrian parliament from 1911 to 1918, and the Diet of Galicia in 1913. In the Galician Diet he represented the Ukrainian National Democratic Party. In 1916, in the midst of World War I, he served as Head of the Central Bank for Lviv, and he was involved in the reconstruction of the region. In October 1918 he became a deputy to the Ukrainian National Council to the newly-formed West Ukrainian People's Republic (ZUNR), and in 9 November 1918 he became State Secretary of Justice. In December 1918, he was appointed to be the next Head of the Council of State Secretaries after Kost Levytsky resigned, and he formally took power on 4 January 1919 alongside being State Secretary of Finance, Trade, and Industry.v He took part in preparing the Unification Act, which nominally united the Ukrainian People's Republic (UNR) and ZUNR, but in practice the ZUNR government under Holubovych still continued to function independently. During his tenure, the council established constitutional order and strengthened the army, but at the same time had inconsistent handling of land reform and still widespread social tensions persisted.

On 9 June 1919, all state authority was transferred to Yevhen Petrushevych, who was granted the title of authorized dictator. Holubovych served as the dictator's plenipotentiary for internal affairs. In November 1919, he left for Vienna, and declined to participate in the ZUNR's Government-in-exile. In 1922, he moved to Lviv, where in 1924 he became head of the Ukrainian People's Labour Party, where he negotiated to merge the party into the Ukrainian National Democratic Alliance (UNDO). Following this, he retired from politics, and in 1931 he returned to working as a lawyer in Zalozhtsi. He died in Lviv on January 12, 1938.
