= Kost Levytsky =

Ukrainian politician (1859–1941)

- Кость Левицький
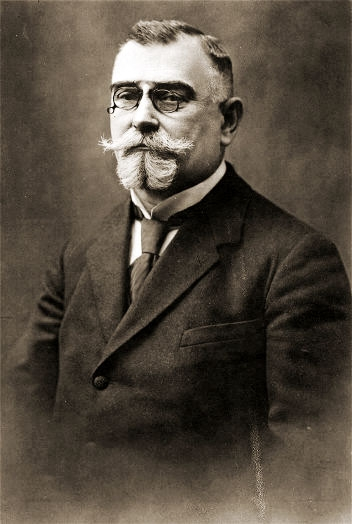

Chairman of State Secretariat of West Ukraine
- In office November 9, 1918 – January 4, 1919
- President: Yevhen Petrushevych (as chairman of council)
- Preceded by: post created
- Succeeded by: Sydir Holubovych

Secretary of Finance of West Ukraine
- In office November 9, 1918 – January 4, 1919
- Prime Minister: himself
- Preceded by: post created
- Succeeded by: Sydir Holubovych

Deputy to Imperial Council
- In office 1907–1918

Deputy to Galician Diet
- In office 1908–1914

Leader of National Democratic Party
- In office 1902–1919
- Preceded by: Julian Romanchuk

Personal details
- Born: Kost Antonovych Levytsky; November 18, 1859 Tysmenytsia, Kingdom of Galicia and Lodomeria, Austrian Empire (now Ivano-Frankivsk Raion, Ivano-Frankivsk Oblast, Ukraine)
- Died: November 12, 1941 (aged 81) Lemberg, General Government (Lviv, Ukraine)
- Resting place: Yanivsky cemetery, Lviv
- Party: Ukrainian National Democratic Party; General Ukrainian Council (1914-16)
- Education: Lviv University (1884)
- Occupation: Lawyer, politician, financial expert, civic activist

Kost Antonovych Levytsky (Ukrainian: Кость Антонович Левицький; 18 November 1859 – 12 November 1941) was a Ukrainian politician. He was a leader of the Ukrainian National Democratic Alliance in the Second Polish Republic and the head of the Council of Seniors of a self-proclaimed Ukrainian government which was declared on 30 June 1941 during the German invasion of the Soviet Union.

== Biography ==
Levytsky was born on November 18, 1859, in the settlement of Tysmenytsia of today's Ivano-Frankivsk Oblast into the family of a Greek Catholic priest. He was the oldest child of Rev. Antin Levytsky (b. ab. 1832 - d. 1909), who was in particular the priest in Nyzhniv and Constancia Kozorowska Levytska (b. ab. 1843 - d. 17 Feb. 1900). After finishing the Stanislaviv gymnasium he studied at Law faculties of Lviv and Vienna Universities. In 1884 he was awarded the Doctor's degree in law, and in 1890 opened the barrister's office in Lviv.

Kost Levytsky took active part in public and political life in his student years, he was one of the leaders of Academic Fraternity, the Circle of Law. From the first years of his barrister's practice K. Levytsky was a practical advocate of the rights and freedoms of people. He united his professional activity with that in the sphere of Ukrainian enterprises, he was a co-founder and leading figure in the economic associations Zorya, People's trade, Dniester, Province Credit Union. At the same time he was a well-known scientist in law, translated foreign laws into Ukrainian, worked with Ukrainian law terminology; he had published German-Ukrainian Law Dictionary, a series of popular works in law for the broad circles of Galician people, founded such professional publications as Chasopys pravnycha ("Law periodical") and Zhyttia i pravo ("Life and Law") and was their editor.

== Political career ==
Kost Levytsky was a patriarch of Ukrainian political life, leader of the land's first political organization Narodna Rada (People's Council, 1885), a cofounder and a head of Ukrainian National Democratic Party. In 1907 he was elected an ambassador of the Austrian parliament, in 1908, that of Galician Sejm, headed the ambassador's clubs. He fought for the national aspirations of Ukrainian people. K. Levytsky was the author of the conception of the national movement development through evolution, organic work and broad political work in masses; he was the adherent of the strategic course for Galicia autonomy as the first step to ward statehood. He favoured development of the mass Ukrainian societies, units of intellectuals, peasants, youths, the Sokil-Sich movement.

=== First World War and its aftermath ===
At the onset of the World War I he headed the Supreme Ukrainian Council (1914) in Vienna, which defined Tsarist Russia as the main enemy of the nation, and called Ukrainians to the struggle against it for the restoration of a united Ukrainian state.

In 1916, as a prosecutor for the Austro-Hungarian Empire, he played a role in the sentencing to death of Ukrainian Russophiles, and sent others to imprisonment in Talerhof.

In Autumn 1918, in the course of disintegration of the Austro-Hungarian empire K. Levytsky became a member of the Ukrainian National Council, which announced formation of the Ukrainian state on October 19, and on November 1 the Council headed a victorious armed uprising in Lviv, Galicia and Bukovina, which resulted in formation of the West Ukrainian People's Republic (ZUNR). Being an experienced public and political figure, K. Levytsky headed the first government – State Secretariate – which developed under the war the state and army formation activity for independence against Poland.

After K. Levytsky's resignation in December 1918 he was a head of the commission on elaboration of the election reform, a representative in the affairs of press and propaganda, in foreign affairs; he also headed diplomatic missions of ZUNR which were sent to Riga (1920), Geneva (1921), he was a member of the ZUNR delegation in Genoa (1922), headed a Committee of political emigration. After the government self-liquidation in 1923, in accordance with the decision of the League of Nations on annexation of Eastern Galicia, he returned to Lwów.

In the years between wars he was a member of the Central Committee of the Ukrainian National Democratic Association (1925–1939), was a director of Centrobank, head of the Union of Ukrainian Barristers, author of fundamental scientific works including The History of the Liberation Struggles of the Galician Ukrainians Since the War of 1914–1918 (Parts I–III. – Lviv, 1929–1930), The Great Derangement: On the History of Ukrainian State in March–November 1918 on the Basis of Recollections and Documents (Lviv, 1931).

=== Second World War and the independent Ukrainian state ===
After the Soviet Army invasion of Poland, in September 1939 (according to the secret part of Molotov–Ribbentrop Pact), he was arrested by the People's Commissariat for Internal Affairs and incarcerated in Lubyanka prison in Moscow. Joseph Stalin, Nikita Khrushchev, Vyacheslav Molotov, and Lavrentiy Beria were involved in the proceedings concerning his case. In the spring of 1941, he was released and returned to Lwów. After the start of Operation Barbarossa, the German invasion of the Soviet Union, an independent Ukrainian State was proclaimed on June 30, 1941. Levytsky headed the State Representative Body – a Council of Seniors (Ukrainian National Council). He worked to curb the excesses of the occupational regime, carried on negotiations with the administration of Distrikt Galizien, petitioned to end groundless repressions, and pleaded for the release of prisoners, often with positive results.

== Death ==
Kost Levytsky died on November 12, 1941, and was buried at Yaniv Cemetery in Lviv.

== See also ==
- Yevhen Petrushevych

== Sources ==
- Display Page at www.encyclopediaofukraine.com
- Ukraine at www.worldstatesmen.org
- Government portal :: Governments of the West Ukrainian People's Republic - Officials at www.kmu.gov.ua
- Struggle for Independence (1917–20) at www.encyclopediaofukraine.com
- Government portal :: Governments of the West Ukrainian People's Republic at www.kmu.gov.ua
