= Hryhoriy Kossak =

Ukrainian teacher and military commander (1882–1939)

- Григорій Йосипович Коссак
- Kossak in Sich Riflemen uniform
- Born: 7 March 1882; Drohobych, Austrian Galicia, Austria-Hungary
- Died: 3 March 1939 (aged 56); Kommunarka shooting ground, Moscow Oblast, Russian SFSR, Soviet Union
- Burial place: Kommunarka shooting ground
- Relatives: Ivan Kossak (brother); Vasyl Kossak (brother); Zenon Kossak (nephew)
- Military career
- Allegiance: Austria-Hungary; West Ukrainian People's Republic; Soviet Union
- Branch: Austro-Hungarian Army; Ukrainian Galician Army; Red Army
- Service years: 1904–1905; 1914–1919; 1924–1931
- Rank: Major (Legion of Ukrainian Sich Riflemen); Colonel (Ukrainian Galician Army); Kombrig (Red Army)
- Nickname: Hryts Kossak
- Units: Legion of Ukrainian Sich Riflemen; III Corps UHA; V Corps UHA
- Commands: 1st Regiment, Ukrainian Sich Riflemen (1915–1916); Training Department (Vyshkil), USS (1918); Commander-in-Chief, Ukrainian Galician Army (November 1918); Stryi Military District (1918); III Corps & V Corps, UHA (1919)
- Conflicts: World War I; Eastern Front; Battle of Galicia; Carpathian Winter War; Battle of Makivka; Gorlice–Tarnów offensive; Great Retreat; Battle of Dniestr and Zolota Lypa; Polish–Ukrainian War; Battle of Lviv; Battle of Khyriv; Vovchukhiv offensive; Chortkiv offensive
- Awards: Military Merit Cross, 3rd Class with War Decoration and Swords; Silver & Bronze Military Merit Medals
- Other work: Teacher, military instructor

Hryhoriy (Hryts) Yosypovych Kossak (Ukrainian: Григорій (Гриць) Йосипович Коссак; German: Gregor Kossak; 7 March 1882 – 3 March 1939) was a Ukrainian teacher, community activist, and military commander. During World War I and the Ukrainian War of Independence, he served as a senior officer and regimental commander of the Ukrainian Sich Riflemen (USS) and held the posts of Commander-in-Chief and corps commander in the Ukrainian Galician Army (UHA). Moving to Soviet Ukraine in 1924 during the Ukrainization period, he taught at Red Army military schools and attained the rank of kombrig before being arrested during the Great Purge and executed at the Kommunarka shooting ground near Moscow in 1939.

== Early life and teaching career ==
Hryhoriy Kossak was born on 7 March 1882 in Drohobych, then part of the Kingdom of Galicia and Lodomeria in Austria-Hungary, into the large artisan family of master blacksmith Yosyf Kossak (of the Kos coat of arms) and Yefrosyniia (née Koberska). His father maintained close ties with Ukrainian writer Ivan Franko, who frequently visited the Kossak home in Drohobych and whose younger brother Onufrii apprenticed in Yosyf Kossak's smithy.

After completing elementary schooling and evening trade classes while working in his father's forge, Kossak studied at the teachers' seminaries in Sambir and Lviv, passing his maturity examination in 1903 and receiving his teaching diploma in 1907. Between 1904 and 1905, he completed one-year volunteer military service in the Austro-Hungarian Landwehr, graduating from the reserve officers' school in Graz and receiving a commission as a reserve lieutenant in 1912.

Kossak taught in Skhidnytsia, Berezhany, and Kozova, where he chaired a branch of the Sokil gymnastic society and co-founded a mutual aid association for Galician and Bukovinian teachers. From 1910 to 1914, he served as headmaster of the four-grade school in Yasenytsia-Silna near Drohobych. There he established a Prosvita reading hall, organized a paramilitary branch of the Sich movement, and trained around 150 local recruits who marched as a separate contingent with a cavalry platoon at the 28 June 1914 Shevchenko Rally (Шевченківський здвиг) in Lviv.

== World War I ==
Following the outbreak of World War I in August 1914, Kossak was mobilized into the Austro-Hungarian Army and seconded at the request of the Ukrainian Combat Board to help organize the volunteer Ukrainian Sich Riflemen (USS) legion. On 7 September 1914, he was appointed commander of the legion's 2nd Battalion (kurin), and following the October 1914 reorganization took command of the 1st Battalion. During the autumn 1914 offensive in the Carpathian Mountains, his battalion fought near Verecke Pass, Skole, and Drohobych, earning praise from corps commander Peter von Hofmann.

From January to March 1915, Kossak served as acting commandant of the USS Legion. In late April and early May 1915, he led his battalion in the Battle of Makivka, helping repulse Russian assaults on the summit, for which he was awarded the Military Merit Cross, 3rd Class with War Decoration. Promoted to Legion major (Legion-Major) in July 1915, he commanded the newly formed 1st Regiment of the Ukrainian Sich Riflemen from August 1915 until March 1916, leading it during the Gorlice–Tarnów offensive, the capture of Halych (June 1915), and the fighting along the Strypa River (autumn 1915).

Internal friction between Kossak—seen by critics as an uncompromising disciplinarian loyal to the Austro-Hungarian command—and a faction of younger officers led to his replacement as regimental commander by Antin Varyvoda in March 1916. From July 1916, Kossak served in the USS Training Department (Vyshkil), acting as its commander from April to July 1918 during the unit's deployment to Dnieper Ukraine near Yelysavethrad.

== Polish–Ukrainian War ==
Following the November Uprising and the outbreak of the Polish–Ukrainian War, Kossak arrived in Lviv and succeeded Dmytro Vitovsky as Commander-in-Chief (Nachalnyi Vozhd) of the Ukrainian Galician Army (UHA) from 5 to 9 November 1918. During the Battle of Lviv, he reorganized the urban defense into sectors and strongpoints, stabilizing the front line, while refusing requests to enlist underage Plast scouts into combat units. After a planned counteroffensive on 7 November failed to dislodge Polish forces and frontline officers objected to his proposal to withdraw to a new defensive line east of the city, Kossak stepped down on 8–9 November in favor of Hnat Stefaniv.

Promoted to colonel on 9 November 1918, Kossak was appointed commandant of the Stryi Military District, overseeing the southern sector of the front following the UHA's withdrawal from Lviv. In early 1919, he was given command of the III Corps of the UHA, directing operations during the Vovchukhiv offensive in February–March 1919. During the Chortkiv offensive in June 1919, he was tasked with forming the V Corps before the UHA retreated across the Zbruch River into central Ukraine in July 1919. On 16 November 1919, opposing the UHA command's alliance with Anton Denikin's Volunteer Army, Kossak left the army at Kamianets-Podilskyi and traveled via Transcarpathia to Czechoslovakia.

== Interwar period in Czechoslovakia and Soviet Ukraine ==
In Czechoslovakia, Kossak was interned in camps at Liberec, Jablonné v Podještědí, and Josefov near Prague, where he served as camp inspector, taught Ukrainian history and language, and attended lectures at the Ukrainian Free University.

Red Army commander Hryhoriy Kossak and publicist Mykola Levytskyi, Kyiv, 1928

Drawn by the Soviet policy of Ukrainization and contacted by Soviet representatives in Prague, Kossak repatriated to the Ukrainian Soviet Socialist Republic in late 1924 alongside a group of former UHA officers. Settling in Kharkiv, he taught Ukrainian studies, tactics, and military strategy at the School of Red Starshynas (officers) and artillery courses. In 1927–1928, he completed senior command courses at the Vystrel course in Moscow and in September 1929 was transferred to Dnipropetrovsk to head military training departments at the local chemical, medical, and mining institutes, attaining the Red Army rank of kombrig in 1930.

== Arrest, execution, and rehabilitation ==
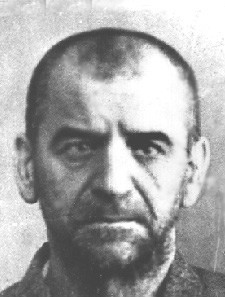
An NKVD mugshot of Kossak following his second arrest in 1938

On 15 January 1931, Kossak was arrested in Dnipropetrovsk by the State Political Directorate (GPU) in connection with the fabricated "Ukrainian National Center" case, in which investigators cast him as the supposed head of an underground insurgent military wing. Sentenced to six years' imprisonment in February 1931, he served his term at the Solovki prison camp and later in Maly Irbit in the Ural Mountains.

Upon his release in 1937, Kossak was barred from returning to Ukraine and settled in Moscow, working as a German-language instructor at the Clara Zetkin factory. During the Great Purge, he was arrested again by the NKVD on 22 February 1938 on fabricated charges of spying for Polish and Czechoslovak intelligence and belonging to the Ukrainian Military Organization. On 2 March 1939, the Military Collegium of the Supreme Court of the Soviet Union sentenced him to death; he was executed by firing squad the following day, 3 March 1939, at the Kommunarka shooting ground near Moscow.

On 3 April 1987, the Plenum of the Supreme Court of the Soviet Union overturned his conviction for lack of corpus delicti and posthumously rehabilitated him.

== Personal life ==
In 1908, Kossak married Olha Yatskovska (1884–1950), the daughter of a Polish county official in Berezhany; after their marriage, she adopted the Ukrainian language and converted to the Ukrainian Greek Catholic Church. They had four children: Sviatoslav (who died in a road accident in 1933 after being expelled from university as the son of an "enemy of the people"), Hanna, Mariia, and Oleksandra.

Two of Kossak's brothers also served as officers in the Ukrainian Sich Riflemen and Ukrainian Galician Army: Ivan Kossak (1876–1927) and Vasyl Kossak (1886–1937, executed during the Great Purge). His nephew, Zenon Kossak (1907–1939), became a prominent leader of the Organization of Ukrainian Nationalists. Streets in Drohobych, Stryi, and Kolomyia are named in Hryhoriy Kossak's honor, and a memorial stone stands on the site of the Kossak family homestead in Drohobych.

== Legacy ==
Streets in Drohobych, Stryi, and Kolomyia are named after Hryhorii Kossak.

Memorial stone on the site of the Kossak family estate in Drohobych, 2025

Kossak was depicted in paintings by Osyp Kurylas. One of these paintings, which has not survived, served as the basis for a Ukrainian Sich Riflemen (USS) postcard in the "January 1918" series. Photographs of Kossak also appeared in the postcard series "Berlin", "August 1917", "UMNA", and "Austrian photographic society — Series 2 — no date". On 27 March 1916, Ivan Ivanets photographed Kossak on horseback. Based on this photograph, Lev Gets drew a portrait of Kossak for the "Lev Gets" postcard series. Kossak is also depicted in Yulian Butsmaniuk's painting Victorious March on Bolekhiv (April 1915), which was reproduced in the "Soyiuzniy Bazar" postcard series.

The Press Quarter of the Ukrainian Sich Riflemen composed a poem about the officers' meeting where Kossak's removal as Legion commandant was discussed, a work later criticized by Semen Horuk. According to historian Osyp Dumin, the poem accurately reflected the attitudes and behavior of the officers of the 1st and 2nd battalions during the meeting.

In Drohobych, a memorial stele stands at 74 Lesi Ukrainky Street on the site of the former Kossak family estate. Unveiled in September 1991 (according to other sources, on 31 October 1995), the monument commemorates three brothers born there who took part in the Ukrainian independence movement: USS colonel Hryhorii Kossak, USS sotnyk Ivan Kossak, and Ukrainian Galician Army chetar Vasyl Kossak. Before World War I, the surrounding historic neighborhood near present-day Lesi Ukrainky and Ivana Franka streets (part of the Lishnia suburb) was locally known as "Kossakivka" after the family.
