= Semen Goruk =

Ukrainian military commander and journalist (1873–1920)

- Семен Васильович Ґорук
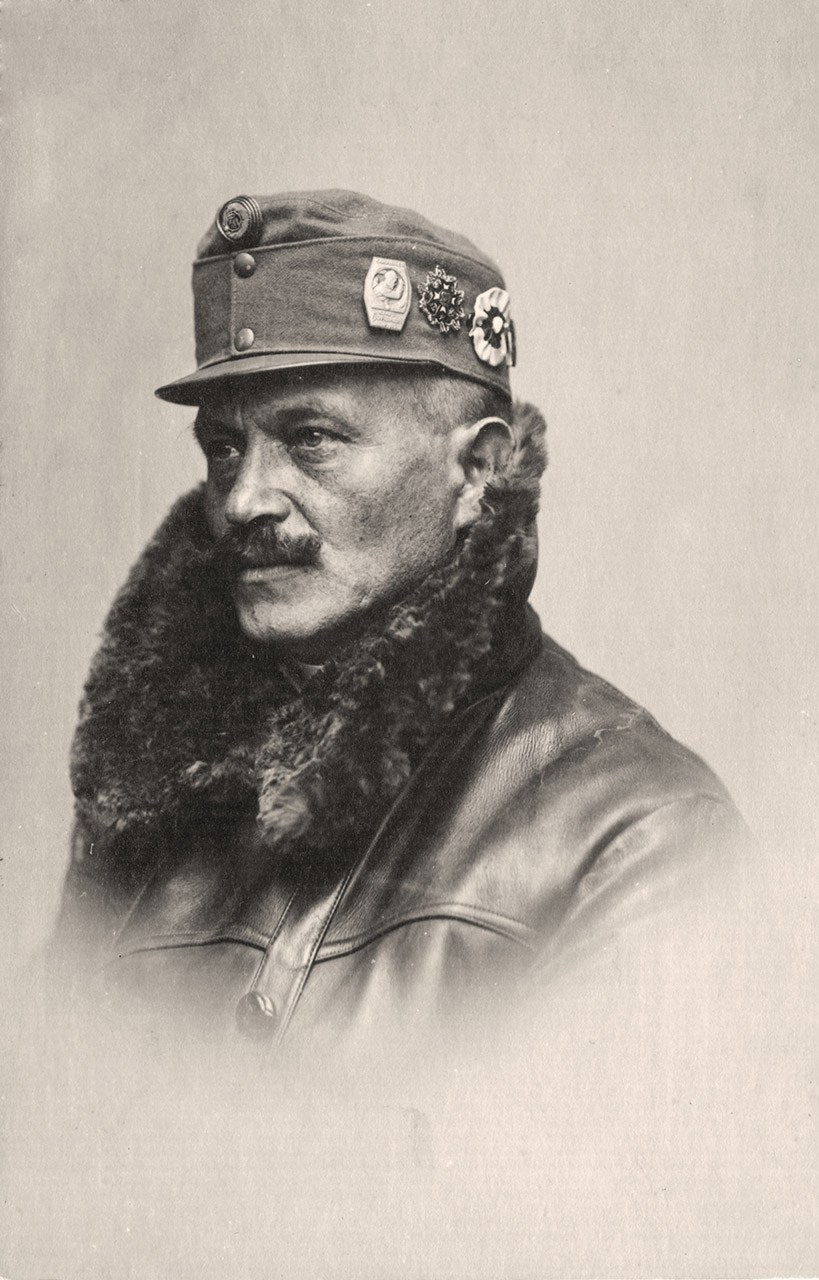
- Goruk in 1918
- Born: 12 September 1873; Sniatyn, Galicia and Lodomeria, Austria-Hungary (now Ivano-Frankivsk Oblast, Ukraine)
- Died: 10 July 1920 (aged 46); White Sea, Russian SFSR
- Resting place: Buried at sea (White Sea)
- Education: University of Lviv
- Military career
- Allegiance: Austria-Hungary; West Ukrainian People's Republic; Ukrainian People's Republic
- Branch: Austro-Hungarian Armed Forces; Ukrainian Galician Army; Red Ukrainian Galician Army
- Service years: 1896–1908; 1914–1920
- Rank: Otaman
- Nickname: Sen Goruk
- Units: Ukrainian Sich Riflemen; 3rd Berezhany Brigade
- Commands: Company & 2nd Battalion (Kurin), Ukrainian Sich Riflemen (1914–1916); Commandant of Lviv (November–December 1918); Chief of Staff, Ukrainian Galician Army (November–December 1918); Commander, 3rd Berezhany Brigade (January–June 1919)
- Conflicts: World War I (POW); Carpathian Winter War; Battle of Makivka; Gorlice–Tarnów offensive; Battle of Dniestr and Zolota Lypa; Brusilov offensive; Battle of Lysonia; Ukrainian War of Independence; Polish–Ukrainian War; November Uprising; Battle of Lviv; Vovchukhiv offensive; Chortkiv offensive; Ukrainian–Soviet War; Polish–Soviet War; Kiev offensive (1920) (executed)
- Awards: Military Merit Cross, 3rd Class with War Decoration; 1898 Jubilee Medal

Semen Vasyliovych Goruk, commonly known as Sen Goruk (Ukrainian: Семе́н Васильович Ґору́к, Сень Ґорук; Polish: Szymon Goruk; German: Simon Goruk; 12 September 1873 – 10 July 1920), was a Ukrainian military commander, journalist, and public figure. He served as an otaman (major) in the Ukrainian Sich Riflemen, the first Chief of Staff of the Ukrainian Galician Army (UHA) and Commandant of Lviv in late 1918, commander of the 3rd Berezhany Brigade, and a staff officer in the Red Ukrainian Galician Army (ChUGA). Arrested by the Cheka in Kyiv in April 1920, he perished on 10 July 1920 while being transported on a barge to the Solovki prison camp in the White Sea.

== Early life and journalism ==
Semen Vasyliovych Goruk was born on 12 September 1873 into a modest Ukrainian Greek Catholic teacher's family of Vasyl and Mahdalyna (née Hlushkevych) Goruk in Sniatyn, then part of the Kingdom of Galicia and Lodomeria in Austria-Hungary. After completing a local school in Sniatyn, he attended the Ukrainian gymnasium in Kolomyia (1887–1895), where he shared a boarding room and formed lifelong friendships with future modernist writers Marko Cheremshyna and Vasyl Stefanyk.

In 1895, Goruk enrolled in the Faculty of Theology at Lviv University before transferring to the Faculty of Philosophy, where he studied intermittently until 1903. In 1896, he was drafted into the Austro-Hungarian Landwehr (19th Landwehr Infantry Regiment), completing one-year volunteer service in 1897–1898 and attaining the rank of cadet officer deputy (Offiziersstellvertreter) on 1 January 1899.

Before World War I, Goruk became a prominent figure in Galician civic, political, and sports life. He was active in Young Ukraine and the Christian-Civic Party, and served as the last pre-war editor of the Lviv newspaper Ruslan (1907–1914). He was also a board member of the Sokil-Batko gymnastic society in Lviv, organizing regional branches and paramilitary riflemen's drills alongside Yevhen Konovalets.

== World War I and captivity ==
Goruk on horseback during the 1916 campaign

At the outbreak of World War I in August 1914, Goruk was mobilized into the Austro-Hungarian Army as a reserve ensign (Fähnrich), initially commanding an infantry platoon guarding the Prut river crossing near Nepolokivtsi in Bukovina. Simultaneously, on 5 August 1914, he joined the organizational section of the Ukrainian Combat Board (Українська бойова управа), which oversaw the formation of the Ukrainian Sich Riflemen (USS) legion.

Commissioned as a Landsturm lieutenant on 10 September 1914, Goruk commanded a company (sotnia) during the autumn 1914 reconnaissance and defensive operations in the Carpathian Mountains (including near Nyzhnie Synovydne and Lavochne). In March 1915, he was promoted to Legion captain (Legion-Hauptmann / otaman) and appointed commander of the 2nd Battalion (kurin) of the USS, and on 1 May 1916 he became a Landsturm first lieutenant (Oberleutnant). He led his unit in major engagements on the Eastern Front, including the Battle of Makivka, battles along the Strypa river, and the fighting at Semykivtsi (1–2 November 1915), where his battalion halted a Russian breakthrough and counterattacked—an action for which he received the Military Merit Cross, 3rd Class with War Decoration, in April 1916.

During the Brusilov offensive, Goruk commanded the 2nd USS Battalion in the heavy fighting for Mount Lysonia and near Potutory outside Berezhany in August–September 1916. On 30 September 1916, after Russian forces broke through neighboring Austro-Hungarian lines and encircled the USS regiment at Potutory, Goruk and most of the surviving riflemen were taken prisoner after a four-hour defense.

He was held in a prisoner-of-war camp in Simbirsk (now Ulyanovsk), where he studied English and French and corresponded with Lviv scholar Kyrylo Studynsky, who informed him in August 1917 of the sudden death of his wife, Stefaniia (née Huzar, whom he had married in March 1916), from mushroom poisoning in Lviv. Following the Treaty of Brest-Litovsk, Goruk was repatriated to Lviv on 8 September 1918.

== Ukrainian Galician Army and death ==
In October 1918, Goruk joined the Ukrainian General Military Commissariat, working alongside Dmytro Vitovsky to organize the November Uprising that established the West Ukrainian People's Republic (ZUNR) on 1 November 1918. During the ensuing Battle of Lviv, he served simultaneously as Commandant of Lviv (from 1 November) and Chief of Staff (General Bulawa) of the Supreme Command of the Ukrainian Galician Army (NKGA) from 5 November to 10 December 1918.

Confirmed in the rank of otaman, Goruk commanded the 3rd Berezhany Brigade of the UHA from January to June 1919 during the Polish–Ukrainian War, and subsequently headed the personnel department at the NKGA from June 1919 to February 1920.

In February 1920, after typhus epidemics and encirclement forced the UHA into an alliance with the Red Army as the Red Ukrainian Galician Army (ChUGA), ChUGA commander Vasyl Poraiko (a fellow native of the Sniatyn region) appointed Goruk head of the personnel section of the field staff in March 1920, although Goruk openly criticized the Bolshevik abolition of traditional ranks and national insignia.

Following the defection of two ChUGA brigades to the Ukrainian People's Army on 23 April 1920 during the Kiev offensive, Soviet security organs launched mass arrests of Galician officers. Goruk was arrested by the Cheka in his office in Kyiv on the night of 23–24 April 1920. In May 1920, he was transferred to the Kozhukhov camp near Moscow, and on 16 June 1920 was dispatched in a prisoner transport bound for the Solovetsky Islands. On 10 July 1920, while crossing the White Sea from Arkhangelsk, the mined transport barge carrying Goruk and other Galician prisoners exploded, killing those aboard.

== Legacy ==
- Streets in his native Sniatyn (where a memorial plaque is mounted on his childhood home) and in Kolomyia are named after Semen Goruk.
- In December 1916, Ukrainian artist Osyp Kurylas painted an oil portrait of Goruk along the Strypa River; the painting is preserved in the Andrey Sheptytsky National Museum of Lviv.
- Goruk appears as a character in Mykola Riabyi's historical novel Berezovyi khrest (2008) and Dmytro Mokhoruk's tetralogy Tiazhkyi khrest (2009).
