= Mazepynka =

Ukrainian military cap

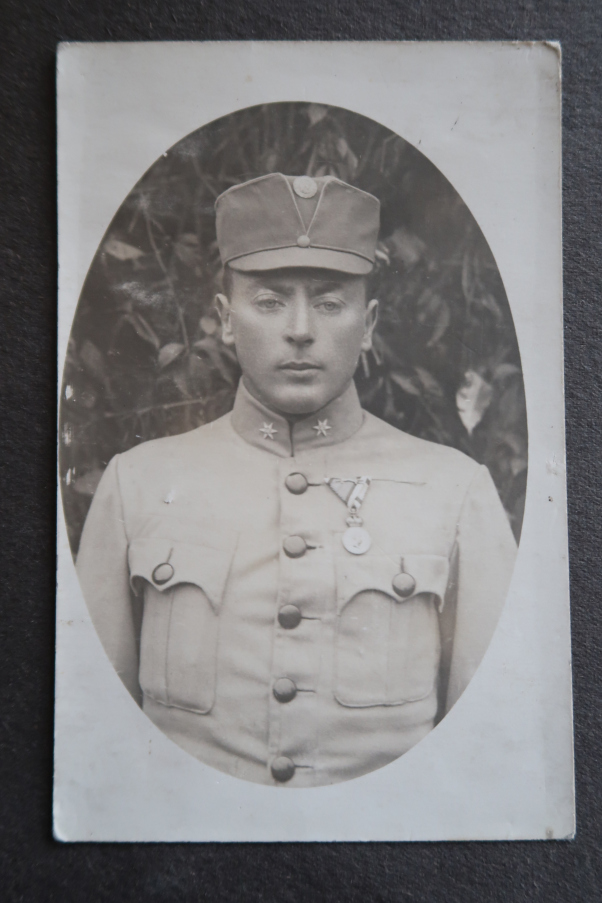
Petro Franko wearing a Mazepynka, 1918

A Mazepynka (Ukrainian: Мазепинка) is a cap worn by Ukrainian soldiers. Created by Levko Lepkyi in 1914, it was named for 17th-century Ukrainian hetman Ivan Mazepa. It has since become a symbol of Ukraine's military, and been adopted by several later groups, including the Ukrainian Galician Army, the Ukrainian Insurgent Army (in a modified form), and, most recently, the Armed Forces of Ukraine since 2015.

== History ==
The Mazepynka was created by Ukrainian intellectual Levko Lepkyi as part of a uniform worn by participants of a congress of Ukrainian organizations, which took place on 28 June 1914 in Lviv. The design of the cap was based on the portrait of Mazepa created by painter Osyp Kurylas. After the creation of the Legion of Ukrainian Sich Riflemen in the same year, the headgear became popular among its soldiers, and was formally adopted by the unit on 10 January 1916. On 17 January 1917, the government of Austria-Hungary began producing Mazepynky for the unit.

By a formal resolution of the State Secretariat for Military Affairs of the West Ukrainian People's Republic dated 22 April 1919, the Mazepynka was adopted as the hat of the Ukrainian Galician Army, in contrast to the Kyivlanka or Petliurivka of the Ukrainian People's Army. By the summer of 1919, however, the Ukrainian Galician Army was integrated into the Ukrainian People's Army, and the Mazepynka was replaced by the Kyivlanka.

In 1938 Mazepynka was worn by members of the Carpathian Sich. During the Second World War it became part of the uniform of the collaborationist Ukrainian People's Revolutionary Army and Ukrainian People's Militsiya. A combined form of the Mazepynka and Kyivlanka, known as a "Banderivka" after nationalist leader Stepan Bandera, later became part of the uniform of the Ukrainian Insurgent Army.

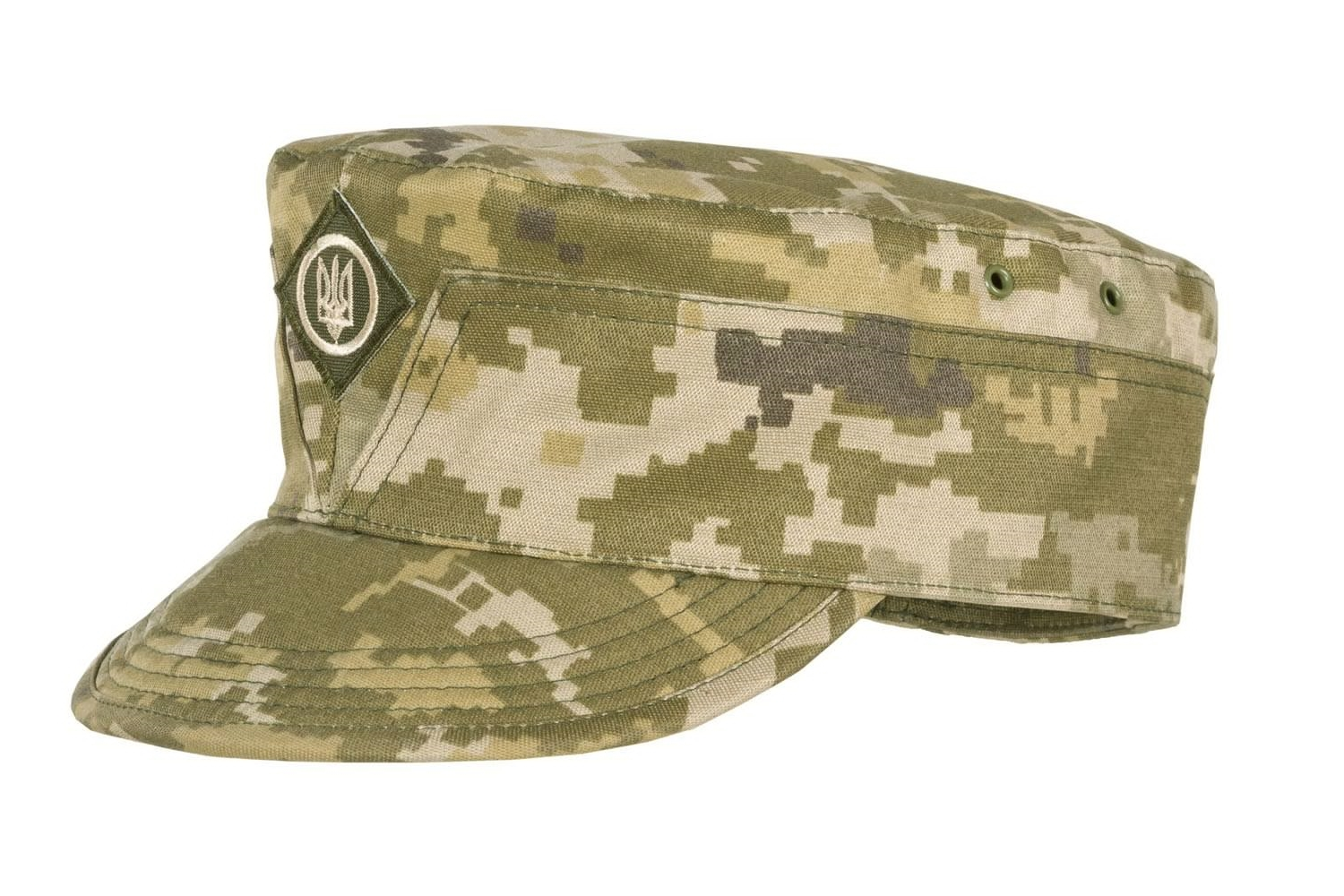
A Mazepynka of the Armed Forces of Ukraine in MM-14 camouflage

A Mazepynka was created by Vasyl Pidhorodetskyi, an imprisoned Ukrainian independence activist, for fellow activist Mykhailo Horyn following the latter's release from Soviet prison in the Mordovian Autonomous Soviet Socialist Republic.

After having used a variation of the Soviet peaked cap since achieving independence in 1991, the Armed Forces of Ukraine adopted the modernized Mazepynka on 4 February 2015. The move was part of a broader rebranding campaign to distance the Armed Forces of Ukraine from the Soviet and Russian militaries, as well as strengthening an independent Ukrainian identity.
