= Alfred Schamanek =

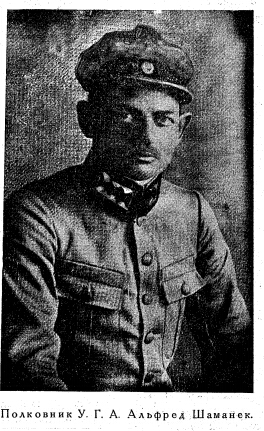
- Schamanek during his service in Ukrainian Galician Army
- Born: 22 May 1883; Lemberg, Austria-Hungary (now Lviv, Ukraine)
- Died: April or May 1920 (aged 36–37) near Cosăuți, Kingdom of Romania (now Moldova)
- Military career
- Allegiance: Austria-Hungary (1901–1918); West Ukrainian People’s Republic (1918–1919); Soviet Ukraine (1920)
- Branch: Austro-Hungarian Army; Ukrainian Galician Army
- Service years: 1901-1920
- Rank: Colonel
- Conflicts: World War I; Carpathian Campaign; Gorlice-Tarnów offensive; Italian Front (World War I); Middle Eastern theatre; Ukrainian War of Independence; Polish-Ukrainian War; Chortkiv offensive; Soviet–Ukrainian War; Capture of Kiev by the White Army

Alfred Schamanek (Ukrainian: Альфред Шаманек; 22 May 1883–April of May 1920) was an Austrian military officer, who later served as a colonel of the Ukrainian Galician Army. During his career, he participated in battles on different frontlines of World War I, including engagements in Syria and the Carpathians. Joining the Ukrainian side following the dissolution of Austria-Hungary, Schamanek became renowned as one of the most talented members of staff of the Galician Army. However, his support for an armistice with the Whites and later alliance with the Red Army made him a highly controversial figure among Ukrainians.

== Biography ==
=== Early life and Austrian service ===
Alfred Schamanek was born on 22 May 1883 in Lemberg, Austria-Hungary (now Lviv, Ukraine) into an ethnic German family, among whose members were Austrian government officials and military officers. During his youth, Schamanek's family moved to Vienna, where he attended a cadet school, graduating in 1903. From that point and until 1911 he studied at the Theresian Military Academy in Wiener Neustadt.

Following the start of World War I, Schamanek in the rank of hauptmann fought as part of the Austro-Hungarian Army, participating in the Carpathian Campaign and Battle of Gorlice-Tarnow, and, possibly, in the Balkan Campaign. He was eventually transferred to the Italian Front, and later to the Middle Eastern theatre of World War I in Syria. Following the end of the war, he was interned in a British Army camp for enemy prisoners of war, but was able to escape to Bulgaria, eventually reaching his native Galicia.

=== Career in the Galician Army ===
After the start of Polish-Ukrainian War, Schamanek joined the ranks of the Galician Army under command of Dmytro Vitovsky, and became a member of its command staff. In April 1919 he was appointed commander of the army's II Corps. On this post Schamanek was one of the chief planners and executors of the Chortkiv Offensive. In his report to West Ukrainian dictator Yevhen Petrushevych, Schamanek blamed the lack of munitions in the army on the unwillingness of Ukrainian People's Republic's leader Symon Petliura to support independent actions by the Galician forces.

On 5 July 1919 Schamanek was appointed chief of staff of the Galician Army. However, ten days later, in face of overwhelming Polish troops, his force had to start a retreat across the Zbruch river into Dnieper Ukraine. There in August 1919 Schamanek joined the general offensive of Ukrainian armies on Kyiv. However, Ukrainian troops eventually had to retreat from their capital under pressure from forces of Anton Denikin.

=== Alliances with the Whites and Reds ===
On 6 November 1919 Schamanek was one of the two supreme officers of the Galician Army along with Myron Tarnavsky, who signed an armistice with the Russian Volunteer Army in Ziatkivtsi. This move by the Galician command was met with harsh criticism from the leadership of the Ukrainian People's Republic, as a result of which both generals were court martialled in Vinnytsia. However, on 14 November Schamanek and Tarnavsky were acquitted, although both were relieved from their posts.

After a new agreement between the Ukrainian Galician Army and the White Movement was reached on 17 November 1919 in Odesa, Schamanek received an order from general-lieutenant Nikolai Schilling to concetrate his forces in the areas of Koziatyn and Berdychiv in order to fight the Bolsheviks. However, Schamanek refused. Due to the ongoing typhus epidemic and generally poor morale of his army, which was exacerbated by Bolshevik propaganda, Schamanek and several other Galician officers joined the Soviets, and in January 1920 he was appointed chief of staff of the newly renamed "Red Ukrainian Galician Army". On 6 February Schamanek headed the staff of the Supreme revolutionary committee of the Galician Army in Birzula. During the following months he engaged in restructuring of his force according to Bolshevik regulations, and until 22 March 1920 commanded the 1st Brigade of Red Ukrainian Sich Riflemen.

=== Attempted defection and murder ===
After growing disillusioned with the Soviet side, Schamanek developed a plan to defect from the Red Ukrainian Galician Army. He planned to enter Polish territory via Romania in order to rejoin forces of the Ukrainian People's Army, which were at the time preparing for a new campaign against the Bolsheviks. However, upon crossing the Dniester in April or May 1920 Schamanek was killed on the Romanian side, either by border guards or by transport personnel, who could have been hired in order to eliminate him. The precise location of his grave is unknown: according to one version, Schamanek's body was buried in the village of Porohy near Yampil, according to another his remains are interred in the village of Cosăuți in modern-day Moldova.
