= Semen Blumenstein-Baranowski =

Ukrainian and Soviet military figure and wartime collaborator (1894/1897–1945)

- Семен Захарович Блюменштейн-Барановський
- Born: 1894 or 1897; Stanyslaviv, Kingdom of Galicia and Lodomeria, Austria-Hungary
- Died: Late 1945; Soviet Union
- Cause of death: Execution by shooting
- Military career
- Allegiance: West Ukrainian People's Republic; Soviet Union; Nazi Germany (collaboration)
- Branch: Ukrainian Galician Army; Red Army; Schutzmannschaft (Auxiliary Police)
- Service years: 1918–1944
- Units: Ukrainian Galician Army "Zadnistrovtsi" partisan detachment
- Commands: Chief of Auxiliary Police, Krasnopillia Raion (1941–1943); Commander, "Zadnistrovtsi" Soviet partisan detachment (1943–1944)
- Conflicts: Polish–Ukrainian War; World War II * Eastern Front

Semen Zakharovych Blumenstein-Baranowski (Ukrainian: Семен Захарович Блюменштейн-Барановський; 1894 or 1897 – late 1945) was a soldier of the Ukrainian Galician Army (UHA) who later became an operative of the Soviet state security organs, chief of the collaborationist auxiliary police in Krasnopillia Raion under German occupation, and subsequently commander of a Soviet partisan detachment during World War II.

== Biography ==
Blumenstein-Baranowski was born in 1894 or 1897 in Stanyslaviv (now Ivano-Frankivsk). In 1918, he enlisted in the Ukrainian Galician Army and fought against Polish forces during the Polish–Ukrainian War. In 1919, he defected to the Bolsheviks and was dispatched behind the front lines into the rear of the Ukrainian People's Army as an agent provocateur to infiltrate Ukrainian independence organizations.

Following the end of the war, he joined the Soviet state security organs. In the 1930s, he worked in the Chief Directorate of the Northern Sea Route, before being arrested by the NKVD in the late 1930s.

After the German invasion of the Soviet Union on 22 June 1941, he was released from custody, mobilized into the Red Army, and assigned to remain in German-occupied Krasnopillia Raion of Sumy Oblast for underground intelligence work. Claiming German descent, he became director of a local sugar refinery and was subsequently appointed chief of the Krasnopillia Raion auxiliary police. In this capacity, he conducted punitive operations against residents of surrounding villages and, from 1942 onward, tracked the Ukrainian nationalist underground for German security services.

In early 1943, as Red Army units approached Sumy Oblast, Blumenstein-Baranowski formed a fictitious partisan unit out of his subordinate policemen and legalized himself before the Soviet command. Despite this, he was arrested by Soviet authorities. In late 1943, however, he was once again parachuted behind German lines into Polish territory, where he organized and commanded the "Zadnistrovtsi" Soviet partisan detachment.

In mid-August 1944, Blumenstein-Baranowski was arrested again. Following a trial in mid-July 1945, he was sentenced to death by shooting and executed shortly thereafter.

== Sources ==
- Ivanushchenko, Hennadii (21–28 September 2011). "Pid chervonymy praporamy: korotka istoriia profesiinoho zradnyka". Panorama (in Ukrainian). No. 39. Sumy. pp. A8–A9.
