= Battle for Height 958 =

1915 WWI battle in Austria-Hungary

Battle of Makivka
- Part of the Eastern Front of the World War I
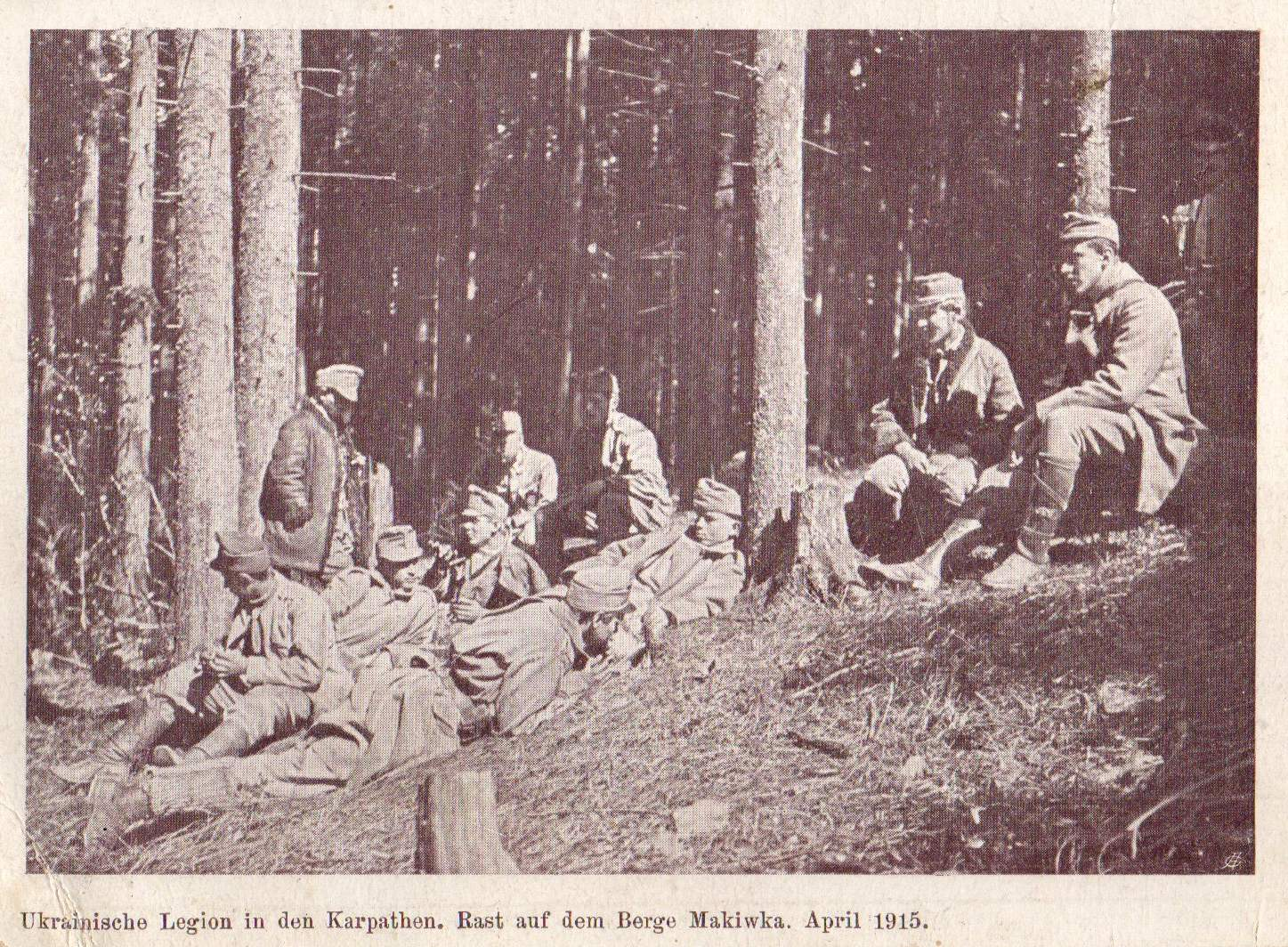
- Ukrainian Sich Riflemen at Makivka in April 1915
Date	28 April - 4 May (O.S.14 - 22 April) 1915
Location	Makivka, near Slavsko, Austria-Hungary
Result	Russian tactical victory

Belligerents
Austria-Hungary; Germany	Russian Empire

Commanders and leaders
(Austria-Hungary) Major general Ignaz Fleischmann	Vladimir Alftan

Units involved
(Austria-Hungary) 55th Austrian Infantry Division: 129th brigade; 130th brigade; 19th Imperial-Royal Landwehr Regiment; 1st and 2nd Ukrainian Sich Riflemen regiments	78th Infantry Division

Strength
Unknown	Unknown

Casualties and losses
Ukrainian sources: 47 killed 76 wounded Many captured Russian sources: 2,000 (on 22 April alone); 3,006 captured 8 flamethrowers	3,170 casualties

Battle for Height 958, known in Ukrainian sources as the Battle of Makivka (Ukrainian: Бої за Маківку) was a relatively small Russian operation to gain control over a height in the Beskids region of the Carpathian mountains. Usually overlooked in German and Austrian sources, the battle received significant coverage in Ukrainian literature because the bulk of Austrian troops in the battle were Ukrainians. The battle ended with the capture of the height, but the Russians could not develop a major offensive to the rear of the Austro-Hungarian forces.

== Location ==
Makivka (Ukrainian: Маківка) is a mountain in the Carpathian mountains, located in the area of Skole Beskids, 8 kilometers north of the town of Slavsko, and reaching the height of 958 meters above sea level.

== Battle ==
After capturing Galicia in September 1914, a Russian army commanded by Nikolai Ivanov started an offensive across the Carpathians with the aim of invading Hungary. The height of Makivka was held by the Legion of Ukrainian Sich Riflemen, whose units, consisting of 7 sotnias, formed part of the 129th and 130th brigades of the Austrian army.

In the night of 28 to 29th April, numerically superior Russian troops begain storming the positions held by Ukrainian Sich Riflemen. After five days of fierce fighting, in which 47 riflemen lost their lives, 76 were wounded and many captured, Russian troops were repelled across the river Holovchanka. After the arrival of reserve troops, Russians started a new advance, which ended with the taking of Makivka on 4 May. However, as a result of heavy losses, Russian troops were unable to continue their advance, and retreated from the area following the arrival of Austrian troops one week later.

== Legacy ==
=== Commemoration ===
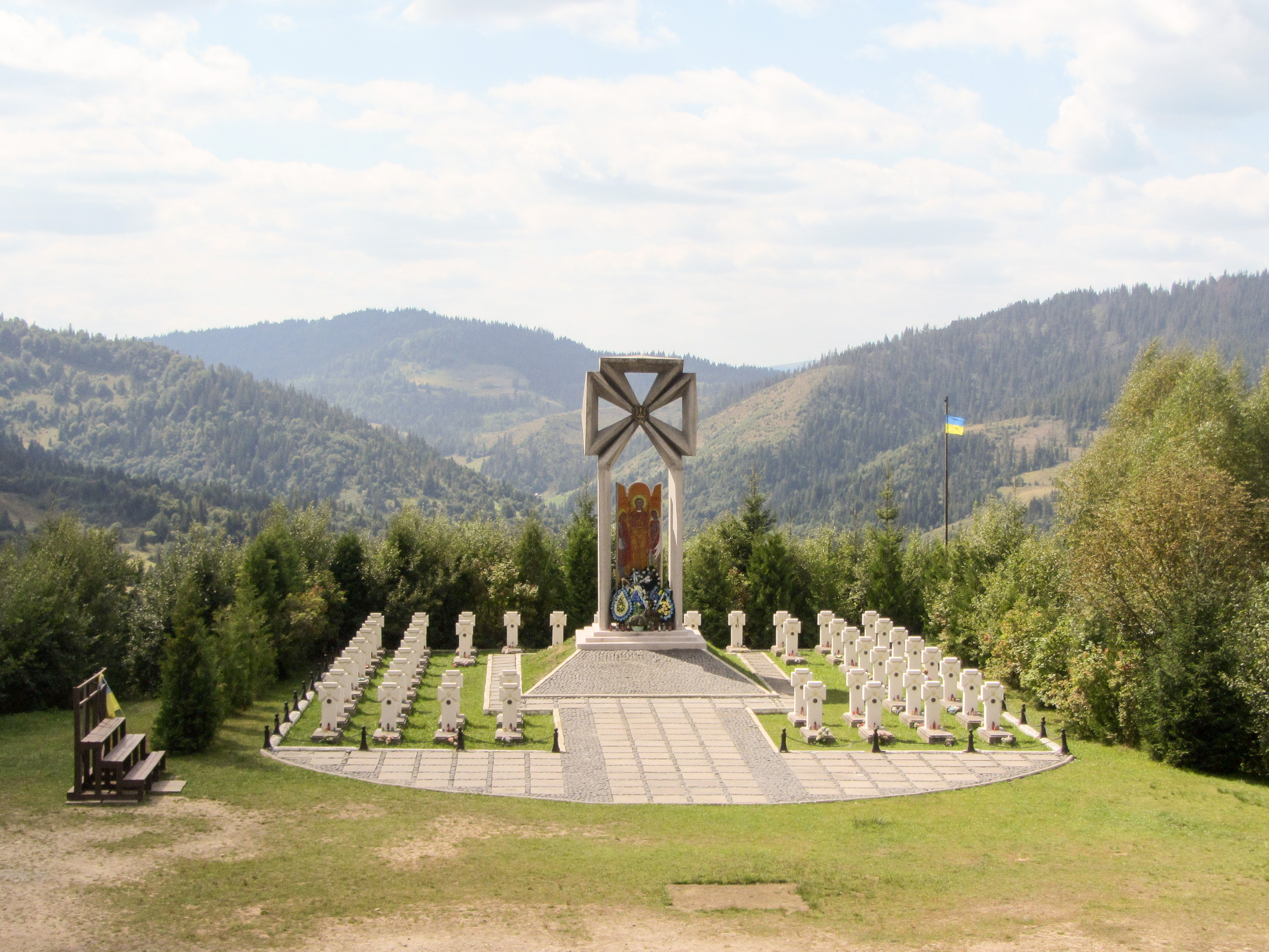
Sich Riflemen memorial at Makivka

Among Ukrainians the battle of Makivka has been widely interpreted as a victory and became a source of national pride. It was the first major battle of the Ukrainian Sich Riflemen and contributed to a rise in the morale of the Ukrainian people. The battle is celebrated in museum displays, monuments, patriotic songs and a movie. The 47 Sich Riflemen fallen at Makivka were buried on the southern slopes of the mountain, where a memorial to fallen Ukrainians was created, and annual memorial services were organized at the location. Starting from the late 1980s, Ukrainian youth activists have organized campings on the mountain, lighting a bonfire in memory of Sich Riflemen fallen in the battle and engaging in war games.

=== In music ===
A patriotic march dedicated to the battle has since become a popular Ukrainian folk song. Several varieties of the song's text are known, with some of them mentioning events of the Ukrainian-Soviet War along with the fights on Makivka. In January 1990 a modernized version of the song was performed by participants of the human chain honouring the 71st anniversary of the Unification Act between the Ukrainian People's Republic and West Ukrainian People's Republic. In modern times the song is being performed by various Ukrainian collectives, including the choir of the Armed Forces of Ukraine.

A version of the song recorded in 1992 in Isakiv, Pokuttia (Ivano-Frankivsk Oblast):

Ukrainian original

Там на горі, на Маківці,
Там ся били січовії стрільці.

Приспів:
— Хлопці, підемо, браття, за славу,
За Україну, за рівні права, державу.
Хлопці, підемо, браття, за славу,
За Україну, за рівні права.

Йдуть до бою — і співають,
І зі співом умирають.

Приспів

Наша сотня вже готова —
Від’їжджає до Кийова.

Приспів

А в Кийові злота брама,
А там висить синьо-жовта фана.

Приспів

English translation

There, on the mountain, on Makivka
There the Sich Riflemen were fighting.

Chorus:
Let's go, boys, we'll be fighting
For Ukraine, for the equal rights and the state.
Let's go, boys, we'll be fighting
For Ukraine, for the equal rights!

Our boys are fighting well,
Go to the battle laughing along the way.

Chorus:

Our company is ready,
Already on its way to Kyiv.

Chorus

There is a Golden Gate in Kyiv,
There waves a blue-yellow banner.

Chorus

== Notable participants ==
External image
- Map of the battle (Russian troops in green, Austro-Hungarian forces in orange)

- Sofia Halechko (1891-1918), Ukrainian cadet and political activist.
- Yevhen Konovalets (1891-1938), Ukrainian officer and leader of the Organization of Ukrainian Nationalists.
- Hryhoriy Kossak (1882-1939), Ukrainian teacher and officer; awarded Military Merit Cross 3rd Class for his actions during the battle; later commanded the Ukrainian Galician Army during the Battle of Lviv.
- Andriy Melnyk (1890–1964), leader of the OUN-M.
- Olena Stepaniv (1892-1963), Ukrainian soldier and economist, first woman of Ukrainian ethnicity to reach an officer's rank.
- Roman Sushko (1894-1944), Ukrainian officer and member of the Organization of Ukrainian Nationalists.

== See also ==
- Ukraine during World War I
- Battle of Kruty
