= Ukrainian Sich Riflemen =

Ukrainian unit during the First World War

Legion of Ukrainian Sich Riflemen
- Sich Riflemen emblem on the cockade
- Active: 1914–1920
- Country: Austria-Hungary (1914-1918); West Ukrainian People's Republic (1918-1919); South Russia (1919-1920); Soviet Ukraine (1920); Ukrainian People's Republic (1920)
- Allegiance: Emperor of Austria (1914-1918); State Secretariat of West Ukrainian People's Republic (1918-1919)
- Branch: Austro-Hungarian Army (1914-1918); Ukrainian Galician Army (1918-1920)
- Type: Division
- Role: Infantry, cavalry, artillery
- Size: 5,000 troops
- Garrison/HQ: Lviv, Stryi
- Nickname: Sich Riflemen
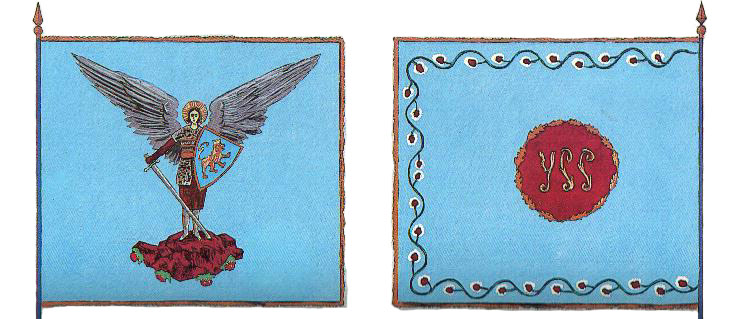
- Colors
- Engagements: World War I (Eastern Front); Battle of Galicia; Carpathian Campaign; Battle of Makivka; Gorlice-Tarnow Offensive; Vistula-Bug Offensive; Brusilov Offensive; Battle of Lysonia; Kerensky Offensive; Operation Faustschlag; 1918 Central Powers occupation of Ukraine; Ukrainian War of Independence; Polish-Ukrainian War; Battle of Lemberg; Soviet-Ukrainian War

Commanders
- Notable commanders: Mykhailo Halushchynskyi; Hryhoriy Kossak; Andriy Melnyk; Myron Tarnavskyi; Osyp Mykytka; Archduke Wilhelm of Austria

Legion of Ukrainian Sich Riflemen (German: Ukrainische Sitschower Schützen; Ukrainian: Українські cічові стрільці (УСС), romanized: Ukrainski sichovi striltsi (USS)) was a Ukrainian unit formed within the Austro-Hungarian Army during the First World War. Known as the first ethnic Ukrainian military formation to fight in a major European war since the 1709 Battle of Poltava, the legion contributed to the revival of national military traditions. During the Ukrainian War of Independence, its veterans played a major role in establishment of both the Ukrainian Galician Army, which emerged following the proclamation of West Ukrainian People's Republic, and of the armed forces of the Ukrainian People's Republic.

== Scope ==
The unit was formed in August 1914 on the initiative of the Supreme Ukrainian Council. It was composed of members of different Ukrainian paramilitary organizations in Galicia, led by Frank Schott, and participated in hostilities on the Russian front. After World War I, with Austria's disintegration, the unit became the regular military unit of the West Ukrainian People's Republic. During German and Austrian occupation of Ukraine in 1918 the unit was stationed in southern Ukraine. Former unit soldiers participated in the formation of Sich Riflemen, a military unit of the Ukrainian People's Republic.

In 1919 the Ukrainian Sich Riflemen expanded into the Ukrainian Galician Army (Ukrainian: Українська Галицька Армія, romanized: Ukrainska Halytska Armiia). They participated in the Polish–Ukrainian War around Lviv and suffered heavy losses. In the aftermath, the unit was transferred to Dnieper Ukraine, where it fought against the Bolsheviks along with fellow Ukrainian units, but was formally subordinated to the command of Russian White Army as a result of an armistice. Following the Whites' defeat, along with other Galician units Ukrainian Sich Riflemen were put under command of the Soviet Ukrainian government, but most of their soldiers eventually deserted to join anti-Bolshevik Ukrainian forces led by Symon Petliura during the Polish-Soviet War. Due to opposition of Polish command to their involvement in the war, on May 2, 1920, the unit was disbanded.

== History ==
=== Origins and formation ===
==== Precursors of Ukrainian paramilitary organizations in Austria-Hungary ====
A number of Ukrainian youth organizations formed in Galicia as early as 1894, the result of the growing national consciousness among Ukrainians living in the region. In 1900, a sports/firefighting organization Sich was founded by a lawyer and social activist Kyrylo Tryliovs'kyi in Sniatyn (today's Ivano-Frankivsk Oblast), which rejuvenated the ideas of Cossack Zaporozhian Sich to foster patriotism among the young. Alongside these organizations, forming all across Galicia, parallel sports/firefighting organizations Sokil (Falcon) were also springing up. By 1912, many smaller Sich companies appeared in numerous Ukrainian communities. Along with these youth organizations, a Women's Organizational Committee was set up to train nurses. The Ukrainian Sich Union coordinated the activities of all local Sich companies and printed its own newspaper, "The Sich News". By the start of the First World War there were at least 2,000 such organizations in Galicia and Bukovina.

In 1911, a philosophy student from Lviv, Ivan Chmola, organized a secret paramilitary group of young men and women from Lviv University, Academic Gymnasium, and other local schools. These enthusiasts learned how to use firearms, prepared military manuals, translated military terminology and lobbied the Austrian authorities to legalize the Ukrainian paramilitary organizations. They were greatly influenced by the similar Polish paramilitary organizations, such as Związek Strzelecki, which were numerous, well-organized and — unlike the Ukrainian organizations — legal. This group later published its own newspaper, "Vidhuk", and continued to organize Lviv's Ukrainian youth. However, several attempts to legalize it were blocked by the local authorities, who were mostly Poles.

Although initially Chmola chose the name "Plast" for this formation, this group represented only one isolated attempt to organize the Ukrainian youth into a legitimate scouting movement under this name. In June 1912, Dr. Oleksandr Tysovs'kyi, a teacher at the Academic Gymnasium in Lviv, administered a ceremony, at which a group of young students under his tutelage took a scout's oath. Thus the official Ukrainian scouting organization Plast was born. Explicitly paramilitary elements were expressly excluded by the organization's constitution, written by Dr. Tysovs'kyi, because he desired to focus its efforts primarily on fostering the ideological aspect of national patriotism, as well as, of course, on advancing the standard scouting curriculum. Possessing greater authority and commanding respect in the Lviv civil society, Dr. Tysovs'kyi won the upper hand, and Ivan Chmola eventually joined efforts with him. Nevertheless, Chmola continued his efforts to train the youth, started organizing scouting camps and teaching adolescents various survival skills, orienteering in different terrains and similar useful skills based on self-reliance, discipline and, most importantly, fellowship. This initiative attracted several prominent individuals, who would later also play important roles in the creation of the Sich Riflemen — for example, Petro Franko, Ivan Franko's son. And many individuals continued to secretly train militarily, of their own accord.

Finally, Kyrylo Tryliovs'kyi translated a similar statute of a Polish paramilitary organization and submitted it to the Austrian authorities for approval. This time, the officials had no choice but to grant approval, and a society of "Sich Riflemen" (Sichovi Stril'tsi) was finally legalized in the Kingdom of Galicia and Lodomeria on 18 March 1913. The first such company was set up in Lviv, soon to be augmented by Ivan Chmola and his group. Legalization of Sich Riflemen gave impetus to other Ukrainian youth organizations, and the ranks of Sich, Sokil and Plast subsequently swelled up all across Western Ukraine.

==== Ukrainian Sich League ====
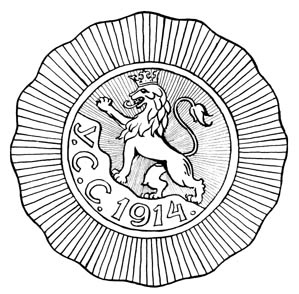
Ukrainian Sich Riflemen's emblem. Modern representation

In the spring of 1913, the Ukrainian Sich League was formed in Lviv, and a statute of Ukrainian Sich Riflemen (USS) was drafted. On 25 January 1914 the second society "Sich Riflemen II" was organized in Lviv, numbering over 300 members. Sich Riflemen I included mostly students and Sich Riflemen II consisted mostly of workers and peasants. By the start of World War I, there were 96 Sich Riflemen societies in Galicia alone. Plast was by then transformed into a full-fledged scouting organization with branches in many towns and villages. Many of the young scouts would continue to voluntarily join Ukrainian Sich Riflemen movement even well after the war was over, and future generations would also participate in the liberation struggles between the wars and in World War II. After many trials and tribulations, having survived in the Ukrainian Diaspora, Plast was reorganized in Ukraine shortly before Ukraine's independence in 1991 and continues to be the largest scouting organization in Ukraine, fostering the values of national patriotism among Ukrainian youth.

Initially there was no unanimity among the founders of the Ukrainian Sich League as to its goals: some wanted complete independence of the Ukrainian people from the Austro-Hungarian empire, and some wanted limited autonomy within the empire. The pro-Austrian faction prevailed, and only units loyal to the Habsburg monarchy were allowed to exist. From its inception, Ukrainian Sich Riflemen saw Russia as their main enemy and were preparing to liberate Ukrainian lands from under the yoke of the Russian Empire. In Galicia and Bukovina, Sich Riflemen were also circulating a magazine called "Vidhuk" ("Response"). In 1914, a statute of USS was published, which established the order of service and the uniforms, provided military terminology and commands in the Ukrainian language. That same year ammunition and rifles were procured for a 10,000-strong Legion of Ukrainian Sich Riflemen, which participated in Lviv parade on 28 June 1914, along with all of the youth organizations - Sich, Sokil and Plast. That same day, Archduke Franz Ferdinand was assassinated in Sarajevo by a Serbian nationalist, precipitating the chain of events that led to World War I.

=== Activities during World War I ===
==== Establishment of the Legion ====
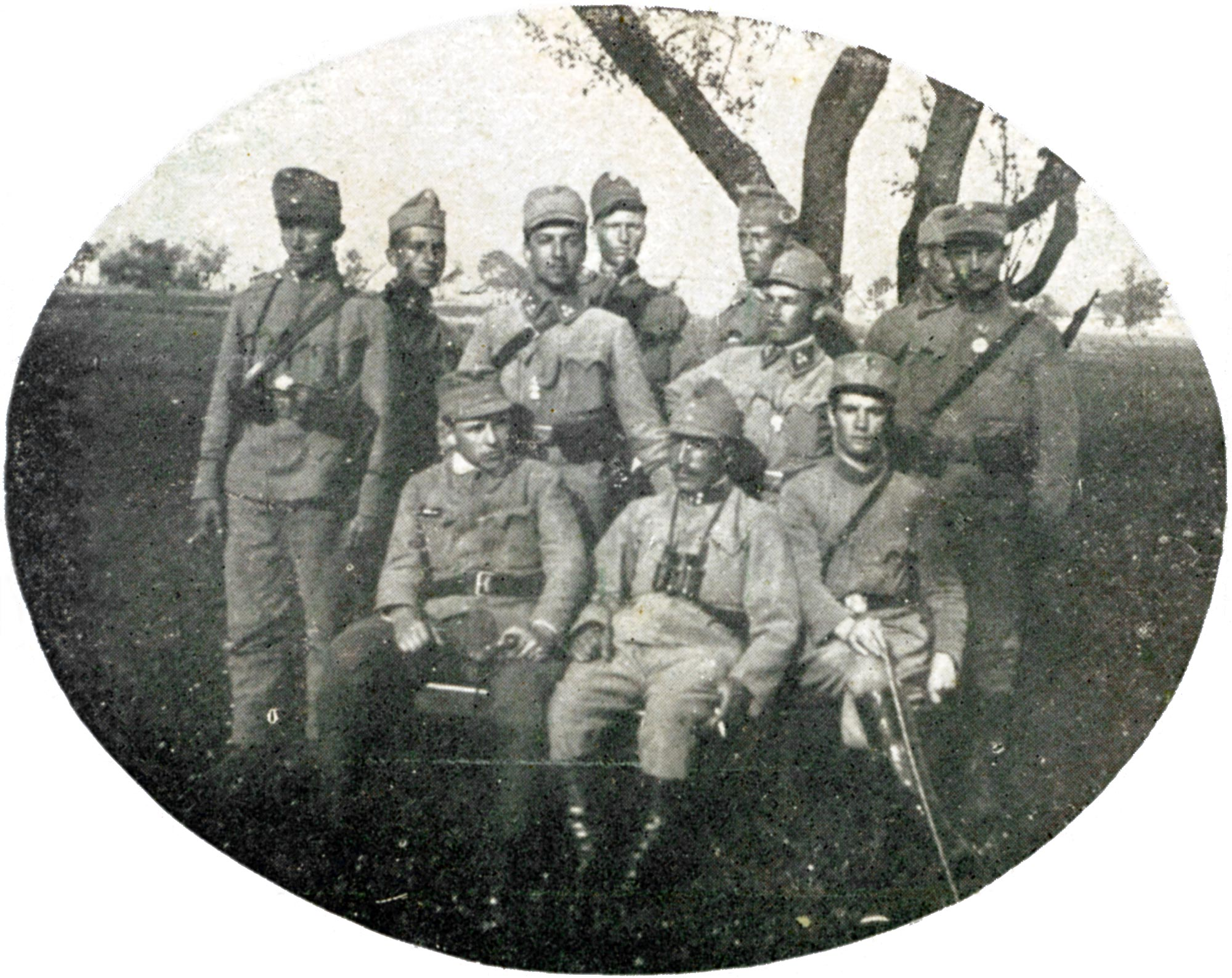
Sotnyk Y. Budzynovskyi with his sotnia staff of the Ukrainian Sich Riflemen.

One month later, World War I broke out. On 6 August 1914, the newly established General Ukrainian Council published in the Lviv newspaper "Dilo" a call for Galician Ukrainians to form volunteer units to fight the Russian Empire. The Ukrainian leaders in Austria-Hungary hoped that the formation of these units would advance the cause of national liberation. They also sought to dispel the claims of some Galician Russophiles that the Ukrainians in that area were sympathetic to Russia. In total, 28,000 volunteers expressed their willingness to join the formation. However, due to the Russian occupation of parts of Galicia, only 10,000 could arrive to the organization's first headquarters in Stryi. The Austrian war ministry was not prepared for the initiative of the General Ukrainian Council and allowed creation of a unit with only 2,500 men, partially due to pressure from local Poles. The first volunteers were mainly members of Ukrainian nationalist organizations such as Sich, Sokil and Plast. The legion was divided into 10 sotnias, each consisting of 250 soldiers. As a result of limitations put on its size by the Austrian government, the majority of ethnic Ukrainians from Galicia fought not in the legion's ranks, but in regular units of the Austro-Hungarian Army.

Initially, the legion was envisioned as a propaganda unit aimed at exerting influence over the local population in Russian-ruled Ukrainian territories occupied by Austrians. However, following the Russian occupation of Galicia in autumn 1914, the unit was forced to deploy as a full-scale military detachment. The legion formed its original base in Transcarpathia, attracting numerous volunteers, mostly patriotic members of Ukrainian youth, and declared the fight for Ukrainian statehood to be its eventual goal. Following a short training session, its soldiers were sent to the Carpathian frontline, and were initially organized into three groups (kurins) led by sotnyks Mykhailo Voloshyn, Hryts Kossak and otaman Stepan Shukhevych. Subjected to the corps commanded by general Peter von Hofmann, those units were designated to the 129th and 130th Brigades and the 55th Infantry Division of the Austro-Hungarian Army. Their original command staff consisted of 16 ethnic Ukrainian officers.

==== Fighting in the Carpathians and Galicia (1914–1918) ====
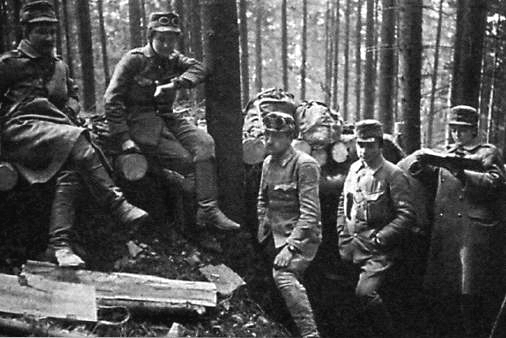
Officers of Ukrainian Sich Riflemen on Mount Makivka, including Olena Stepaniv and Sofia Halechko

In late September 1914 the legion saw its first frontline action, being employed against Russian Cossack units. Before and during the battle in the Carpathians, the legion was on reconnaissance and small-scale duty or inserted between regular troops to keep it under control. During that time the legion's soldiers guarded the Veretskyi and Uzhok passes. Initially, the unit was supervised by a commandant, first Teodor Rozhankovskyi, and later Mykhailo Halushchynskyi. In March 1915, the post of commandant was abolished and the legion was directly subordinated to the corps command, which led to its division in two autonomous kurins, led by Hryts Kossak and Semen Goruk (later replaced by Vasyl Didushok), as well as a reserve sotnia. Between 29 April and 3 May 1915, Ukrainian Sich Riflemen took part in the battle for Mount Makivka, which in repulsion of Russian troops. The initial mistrust of the army leadership turned out to be unfounded, and the officers and enlisted men were officially given the "best report card." Field Marshal Lieutenant Hofmann especially praised the legion's small company reconnaissance capabilities. The legion also saw successful action as part of Hofmann's Corps in the Bug Offensive and the Battle of Gorlice-Tarnów. After distinguishing itself in fighting around Bolekhiv, Halych, Zavadiv and Semykivtsi, in summer 1915 the unit established its positions along the Strypa river, near Sosniv.

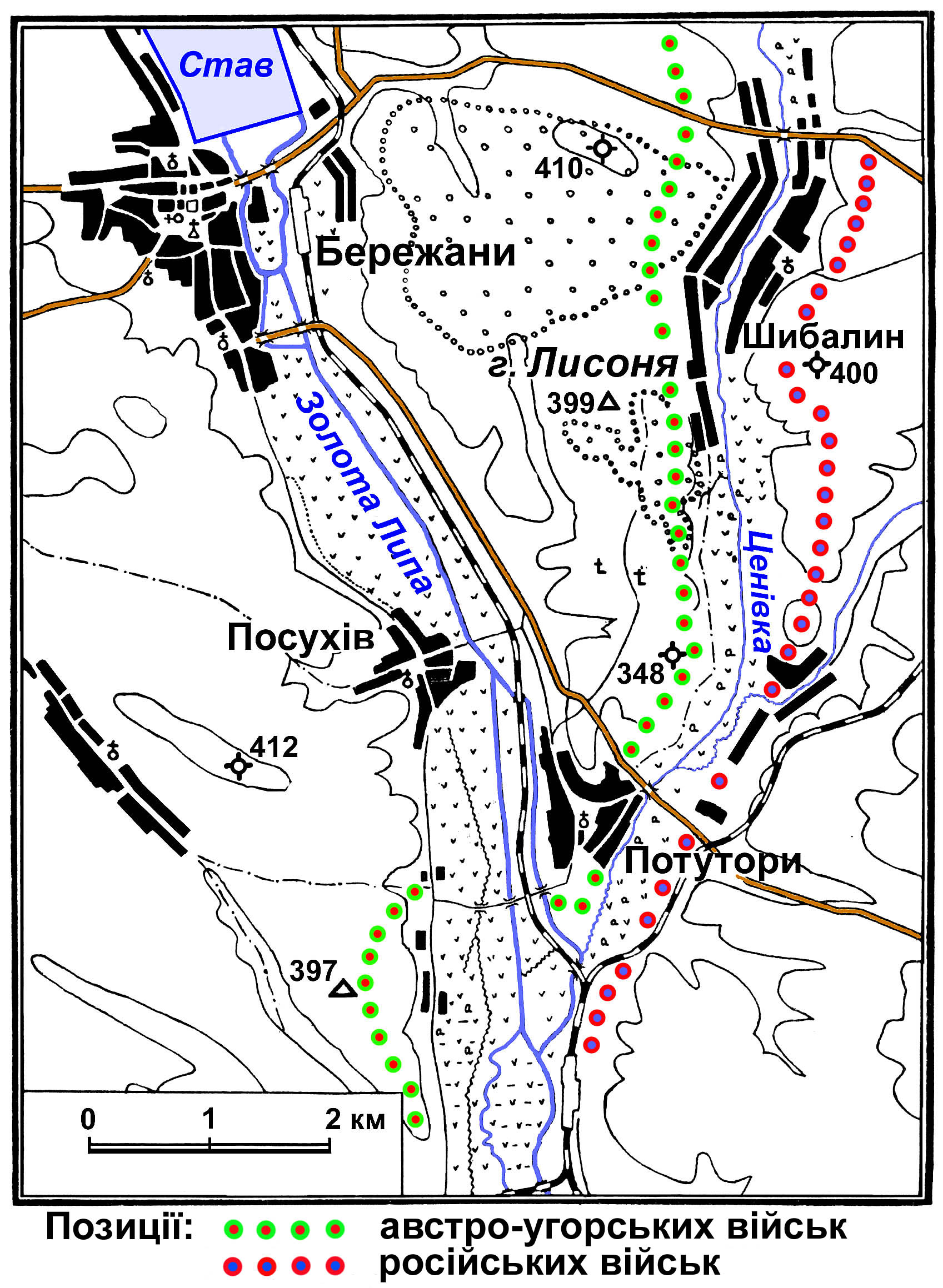
Positions of Russian (pink) and Austro-Hungarian forces (green), including Ukrainian Sich Riflemen, at Potutory and Lysonia near Berezhany, September 1916

As of September 1915, the legion consisted of one regiment counting 1,700 soldiers, as well as a reserve detachment of around 500 new recruits. Having suffered significant losses, the unit was withdrawn into the rear, returning to the front in May 1916. At the start of Brusilov Offensive, the legion counted 47 officers and 1685 soldiers. In August 1916 it was reformed into a separate regiment as part of the 55th Division, and transferred to the Lysonia hill in the vicinity of Berezhany. During August and September 1916, the unit was almost completely routed in an engagement at Potutory near Berezhany. Because of a breakthrough in the adjacent section of the front, Russian troops were able to surround and capture most of the legion. As a result, it lost 28 of its 44 officers and around 1,000 regular soldiers, and by 30 September only 9 officers and 444 regulars remained in the legion's ranks. During regrouping it was assigned to the K.u.k. Hutsulenkompanie (the former "Ruthenian" or "Bukovina Volunteer Battalion") and incorporated into it as a separate company.

Negotiations between the Austrian government and Polish representatives, which took place in late 1916, ended with a promise to transfer Galicia under control of the future Polish state, which negatively affected the riflemen's motivation by threatening to deprive them of their homeland. In February 1917 the unit returned to the front near Berezhany. On July 1, 1917, at the beginning of the Kerensky Offensive, part of the legion in action was once again trapped by a Russian attack at Koniukhy. Only around 400 members of the unit were able to evade capture. In the aftermath, the legion was reformed as a single kurin and advanced towards the Zbruch river. In November 1917, captured fighters of the legion, among them Andriy Melnyk and Roman Sushko, initiated the formation of Sich Riflemen, a unit of the Ukrainian People's Army loyal to the newly proclaimed Ukrainian People's Republic.

==== Activities in Greater Ukraine (1918) ====
Following the Treaty of Brest in February 1918, 2nd Regiment of the Polish Legions commanded by Józef Haller revolted against the Austrian command and crossed to the Russian side of the frontline. As a result, the government threatened to disband all ethnic units of the Austrian army. However, Ukrainian Sich Riflemen were spared from that measure through the intervention of Archduke Wilhelm of Austria, known among Ukrainians as Vasyl Vyshyvanyi. The archduke was known for his sympathies to the Ukrainian national movement, and was soon thereafter appointed to command the legion by Emperor Karl. On 27 February 1918, Austrian troops, including fighters of the legion, crossed the border on an invitation from the government of the Ukrainian People's Republic, passing through Kamianets-Podilskyi, Zhmerynka and Tulchyn. At the time, morale of the Ukrainian People's Army had been severely damaged by Bolshevik propaganda, with units of Sich Riflemen formed to a large degree from former members of Ukrainian Sich Riflemen, remaining one of the few units loyal to the government. Based on this experience, the republic's leader Mykhailo Hrushevskyi saw possible help from Ukrainian Sich Riflemen as an important contribution in providing Ukraine's independence. At the time, the legion was commanded by Myron Tarnavskyi, who was later replaced by Osyp Mykytka.

With the German occupation of Ukraine in early 1918, Emperor Charles created the special unit Kampfgruppe Erzherzog Wilhelm under command of Archduke Wilhelm with about 4,000 soldiers, which included the Ukrainian Legion. It operated in the south of Ukraine during and after the conquest of Ukraine by the Central Powers in 1918. After passing Birzula, in mid-March the legion reached Odesa, and on 5 April started its move towards Kherson. Encountering little resistance, the unit used the Dnieper River as a transport route, and on 8 April its fighters embarked two steamships on their way to Oleksandrivsk (modern Zaporizhzhia) via Nikopol. At the time, the city was held by the Bolsheviks. Without coordinating their actions with German units stationed nearby, on 13 April the riflemen attempted to capture the local railway station, but were repelled from the city on the next day. The last engagement of the legion under the Habsburg banner took place on April 16, 1918, with the unit expelling Bolshevik troops from Oleksandrivsk in cooperation with the German army and Zaporozhian Corps of the Ukrainian People's Army.

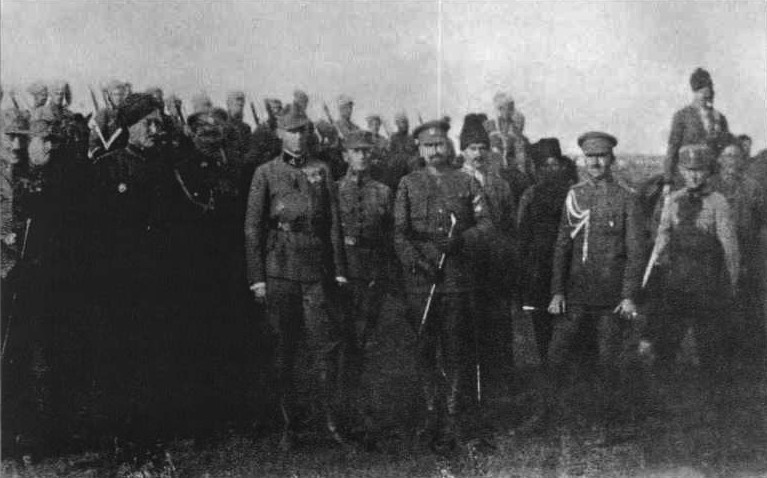
Archduke Wilhelm posing with Bolbochan during a meeting between the officers of Ukrainian Sich Riflemen and Zaporozhian Corps in Oleksandrivsk, 1918

Following the Hetman's Coup in Kyiv, which led to the establishment of a new government under hetman Pavlo Skoropadskyi, the Habsburg Monarchy felt itself in danger of losing influence over Ukraine in favour of Germany. Simultaneously, tensions emerged between the Ukrainian Sich Rilemen, who were still officially subordinate to Austrian command, and local units of the Ukrainian People's Army commanded by Vsevolod Petriv. Local Ukrainian command led by colonel Petro Bolbochan refused to accept the hetman's representative, and initiated talks with Vyshyvanyi and his men, going as far as to offer him to head a future Ukrainian monarchy. A similar proposal was issued by a congress of Ukrainian political parties in Odesa, but Wilhelm declined those offfers, not wishing to provoke the Germans. In early summer 1918, the legion was transferred to the outskirts of Yelysavethrad in Kherson Governorate in order to help local authorities in suppression of peasant revolts in the area. However, the unit's soldiers proved unwilling to take part in punitive actions and requisition of property, and some of them even supported the insurgents. As a result, Wilhelm encountered difficulties in his relations with Austrian and German authorities. Finally, in early October 1918 the legion was recalled to Bukovina, ending its participation in the First World War.

=== After World War I ===
After the beginning of fighting between Polish and Ukrainian troops in Lviv, the legion arrived to the city on 3 November 1918, but its actions failed to decisively affect the situation. Subsequently, the unit was subjected to the Eastern Group of forces of the Ukrainian Galician Army. In January 1919 it was reformed as the 1st Brigade of Ukrainian Sich Riflemen and consisted of one (later two) infantry regiments, a cavalry sotnia, an artillery regiment and several auxiliary detachments. Its commandant at the time was Osyp Bukshovanyi. The legion was considered to be the best-trained unit of the Ukrainian Galician Army.

Following the end of Polish-Ukrainian War, the unit retreated across the Zbruch river into Dnieper Ukraine along with other parts of the Galician Army. After uniting with forces of the Ukrainian People's Army, its soldiers took part in the war against the Bolsheviks until November 1919, when Galicians allied themselves with Denikin's White Army. After the defeat of Denikin's troops, the unit established contacts with the Bolsheviks, formally subordinating itself to their ideology. However, after the split between the Bolsheviks and Ukrainian Borotbists, that temporary alliance was increasingly ridden with tensions, and with the start of the Polish offensive into Ukraine, Ukrainian Sich Riflemen expressed their wish to join Ukrainian units fighting on the side of the Poles. However, those riflemen who managed to reach Polish positions were forced to disarm. Following the 1920 Treaty of Warsaw the corps of Ukrainian Sich Riflemen was disbanded.

== Organization ==
The unit's reserve department operated recruitment centres in Lviv, Stanislav and Syhit, as well as in Vienna, where the military organizational committee was located. The unit's schooling base (kish) was located near Mukachevo in Transcarpathia. In 1916 the legion's training department was subordinated to the German Army, which allowed German instructors to take part in the schooling of its soldiers. By 1918 it had provided military training for around 7,000 volunteers. Contrary to common practice of the time, command of the Ukrainian Sich Riflemen allowed female volunteers to fight on par with men. Among notable women who volunteered to serve in the legion were Olena Stepaniv, Sofia Halechko, Olha Basarab and Hanna Dmyterko.

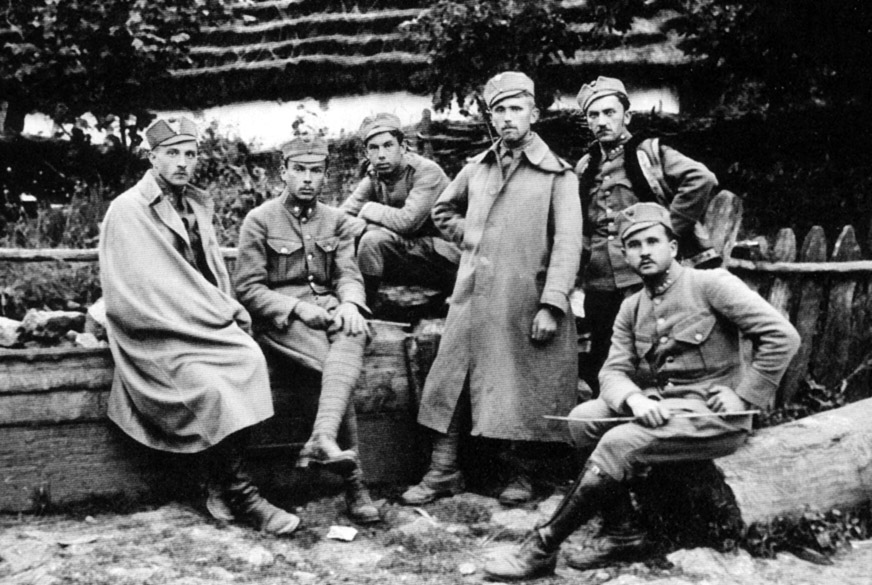
Members of the legion's press quarters in 1916

In order to popularize the legion's activities, a press quarters was established by its members in March 1915 and soon spread its activities to frontline regions. Its personnel engaged in photographic documentation of Sich Riflemen's everyday activities, composed a number of patriotic songs (most famously, Oi u luzi chervona kalyna) and published a number of periodicals, most of which were dedicated to frontline humor. The legion also organized its own orchestra headed by Mykhailo Haivoronskyi. Among other notable cultural activists active in ranks of Ukrainian Sich Riflemen were Stepan Charnetskyi, Roman Kupchynskyi, Levko Lepkyi, Osyp Kurylas, Osyp Sorokhtei, Yulian Nazarak, Mykola Holubets and Ivan Boberskyi.

Personnel of the press quaters supported a number of educational projects in the areas of Sich Riflemen's disposition, which in different periods included Transcarpathia, Galicia, Volhynia and Dnieper Ukraine. Among others, they were responsible for the publication of grammar books for Ukrainian children. Alone in Volhynia, Sich Riflemen established over 80 Ukrainian schools. During their stay in Oleksandrivsk, the unit's commmand promoted Ukrainization efforts and ordered the removal of Russian-language inscriptions around the city, which led to protests among local Russians and Jews. The legion's soldiers also participated in edition of press publications in the city and cooperated with local Prosvita, organizing tours around the Khortytsia island. Following the withdrawal of the unit's command from the city, two of its members who had cooperated with local press were imprisoned by Ukrainian State's authorities, and their newspaper was closed down.

== Ranks ==
=== Commissioned officer ranks ===
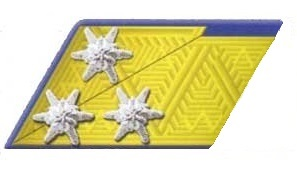
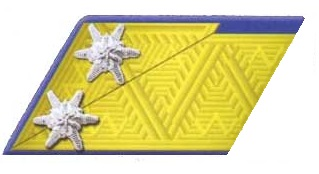
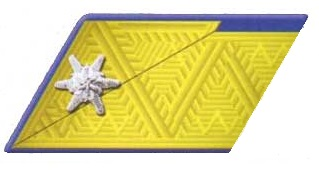
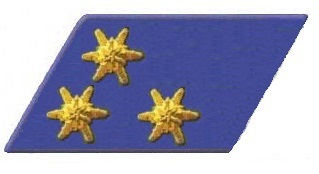
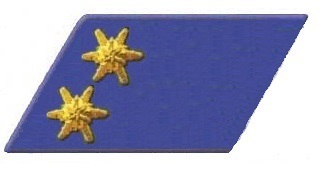
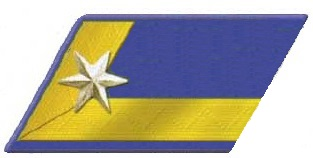
Rank group	Field/senior officers			Junior officers			Student officers
Ukrainian Sich Riflemen
Ukrainian Sich Riflemen	Полковник; Polkovnyk	Підполковник; Pidpolkovnyk	Отаман; Otaman	Сотник; Sotnyk	Поручник; Poruchnyk	Підпоручник; Pidporuchnyk	Хорунжий; Khorunzhyy
k.u.k. Army equivalent	Oberst	Oberstleutnant	Major	Hauptmann/ Rittmeister	Oberleutnant	Leutnant	Fähnrich

=== Other ranks ===
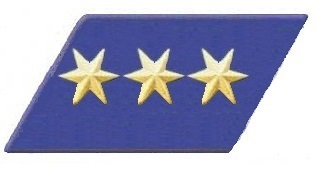
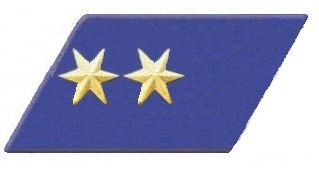
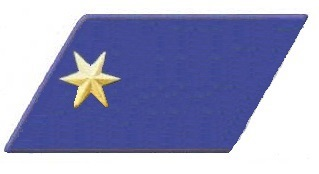
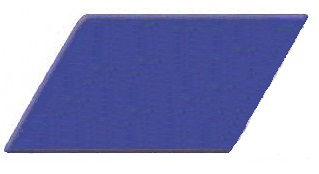
Rank group	NCOs			Enlisted ranks
Ukrainian Sich Riflemen
Ukrainian Sich Riflemen	Підхорунжий; Pidkhorunzhyy	Десятник; Desyatnyk	Вістун; Vistun	Старший стрілець Starshyy striletsʹ	Стрілець; Striletsʹ
k.u.k. Army equivalent	Feldwebel	Zugsführer	Korporal	Gefreiter	Infanterist

== Legacy ==
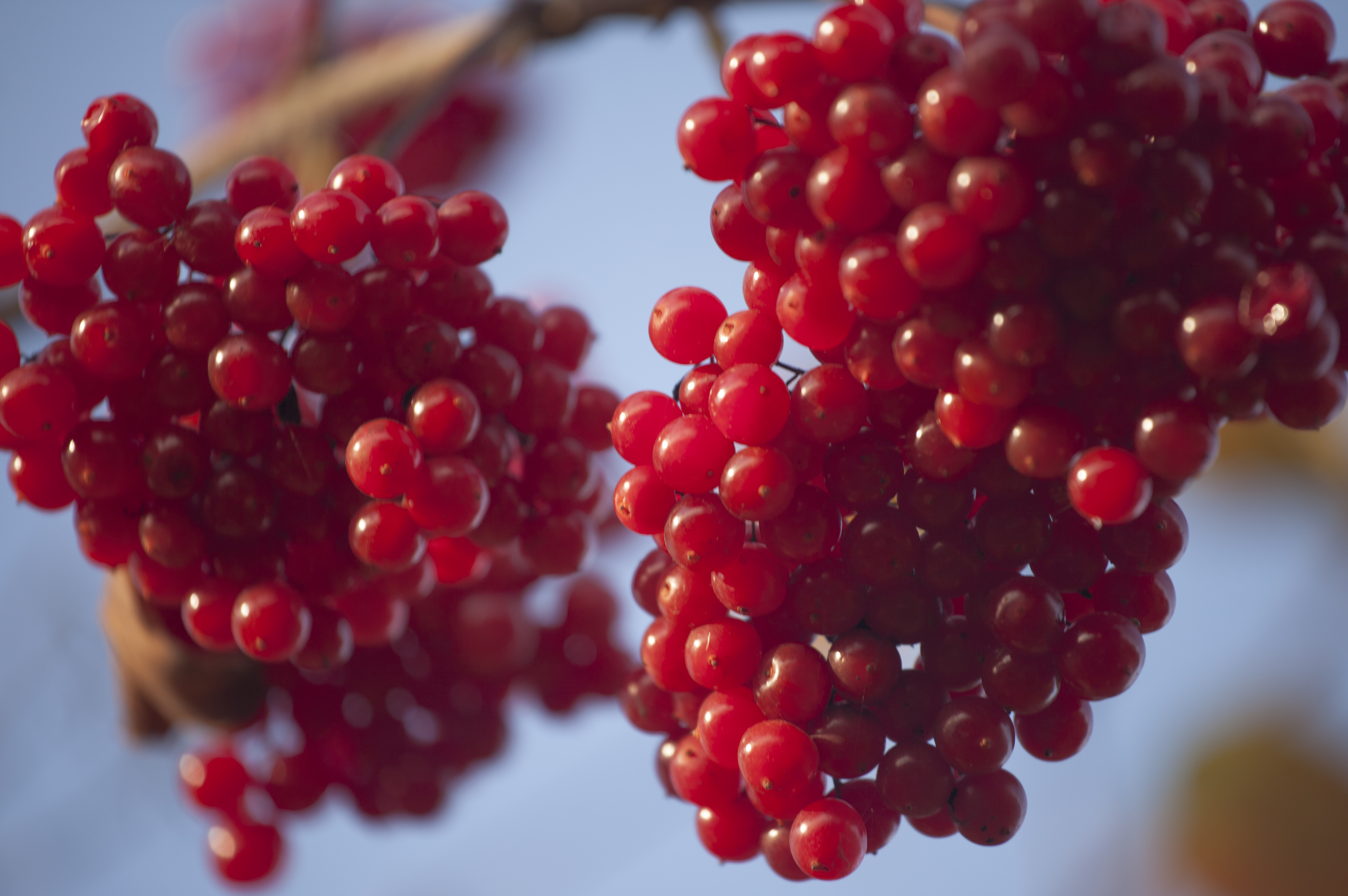
Red Viburnum berries.

The unit is commemorated in the 1914 song "Oh, the Red Viburnum in the Meadow" (Ukrainian: Ой у лузі червона калина).

A distinct type of cap worn by members of the legion, nicknamed Mazepynka after hetman Ivan Mazepa, was later adopted as headgear by the Ukrainian Galician Army, Carpathian Sich, Ukrainian People's Militia and the Ukrainian Insurgent Army. Since 2015, Mazepynka has served as the field cap of Armed Forces of Ukraine.

== See also ==
- Austro-Hungarian Army
- Sich Riflemen

== Literature ==
- Orest Subtelny. Ukraine. A history. University of Toronto press. 1994. ISBN 978-0-8020-0591-5.
- Paul Robert Magocsi. The Roots of Ukrainian Nationalism: Galicia As Ukraine's Piedmont. University of Toronto Press. 2002. ISBN 0-521-81988-1.
- Encyclopedia of Ukraine on Line. Ukrainian Sich Riflemen.
- Stepan Ripets'ky. Ukrainian Sich Riflemen. Online version.
