= Stepan Shukhevych =

Ukrainian lawyer, military commander, and memoirist (1877–1945)

- Степан Євгенович Шухевич
- Shukhevych in 1914
- Born: 1 January 1877; Serafyntsi, Horodenka, Kingdom of Galicia and Lodomeria, Austria-Hungary
- Died: 6 June 1945 (aged 68); Amberg, Allied-occupied Germany
- Education: Lviv University
- Relatives: Volodymyr Shukhevych (uncle); Roman Shukhevych (first cousin once removed)
- Military career
- Allegiance: Austria-Hungary; West Ukrainian People's Republic
- Branch: Austro-Hungarian Army; Ukrainian Galician Army
- Service years: 1914–1920
- Rank: Otaman (Major)
- Units: Ukrainian Sich Riflemen; 4th Zolochiv Brigade
- Commands: 2nd Battalion (Kurin), Ukrainian Sich Riflemen (1914–1916); Military Commandant of Lviv (1918); Commander, 4th Zolochiv Brigade (1919)
- Conflicts: World War I; Eastern Front; Ukrainian War of Independence; Polish–Ukrainian War; Ukrainian–Soviet War
- Other work: Judge, defense lawyer, memoirist

Stepan Yevhenovych Shukhevych (Ukrainian: Степан Євгенович Шухевич; 1 January 1877 – 6 June 1945) was a Ukrainian lawyer, military commander, publicist, and memoirist. During World War I and the Ukrainian War of Independence, he served as an otaman (major) in the Ukrainian Sich Riflemen (USS) and the Ukrainian Galician Army (UHA). In interwar Poland, he became one of the most prominent Ukrainian defense attorneys in political trials and chaired the supervisory board of the Chervona Kalyna publishing cooperative in Lviv.

== Early life and judicial career ==
Stepan Shukhevych was born on 1 January 1877 in the village of Serafyntsi near Horodenka, then part of the Kingdom of Galicia and Lodomeria in Austria-Hungary (now in Kolomyia Raion, Ivano-Frankivsk Oblast, Ukraine), into the family of Ukrainian Greek Catholic priest Yevhen Shukhevych and Volodymyra (née Velytska). He was a nephew of ethnographer Volodymyr Shukhevych and a first cousin of Osyp Shukhevych, father of future Ukrainian Insurgent Army commander Roman Shukhevych.

He attended the Lviv Academic Gymnasium (1886–1895) and graduated from the Faculty of Law at Lviv University in 1899, where his professors included historian Mykhailo Hrushevsky. Active in the Sokil and Sich civic and gymnastic societies, Shukhevych completed judicial internships in Vienna and Lviv before serving as a judge in Rava-Ruska, Dolyna, and Drohobych from 1903 to 1911. In 1911, he opened a private law practice.

== World War I and Ukrainian War of Independence ==
Following the outbreak of World War I in 1914, Shukhevych helped organize the volunteer Ukrainian Sich Riflemen (USS) legion, serving from October 1914 to 1916 as commander (komandant) of the 2nd Battalion (kurin) with the rank of otaman (major), and subsequently as a captain in the Austro-Hungarian Army in 1917. In 1918, he served as commandant of the Austro-Hungarian field gendarmerie under the governor of Odesa.

After the proclamation of the West Ukrainian People's Republic (ZUNR) in November 1918, Shukhevych joined the Ukrainian Galician Army (UHA). He served briefly as military commandant of Lviv and commandant of Pidvolochysk, before assuming command of the 4th Zolochiv Brigade of the UHA in the rank of otaman, and later serving as personnel officer at the Supreme Command of the UHA (NKGA). In July 1919, he headed a ZUNR diplomatic mission sent to Lviv for negotiations with Polish authorities.

In November 1919, Shukhevych participated in Allied military consultations convened by Symon Petliura in Zhmerynka and presided over the field court-martial in Vinnytsia (13–14 November 1919) that tried UHA commander Myron Tarnavsky and staff officers over their unauthorized armistice with Anton Denikin's Volunteer Army. Following the UHA's withdrawal from the front due to typhus epidemics in December 1919, he chaired an officers' collegium planning the army's future course and joined a committee caring for some 3,000 sick riflemen. In April 1920, leading a cavalry detachment, he broke out of Polish encirclement near Makhnivka.

== Interwar legal practice and publishing ==
Returning to Lviv in the Second Polish Republic, Shukhevych resumed his legal career and lectured in criminal law at the Lviv Secret Ukrainian University between 1921 and 1925. He gained prominence as one of the leading defense lawyers representing Ukrainian political prisoners and members of the Ukrainian Military Organization (UVO) and Organization of Ukrainian Nationalists (OUN) in high-profile trials before Polish courts. Among the cases in which he appeared were:

- the trial of Stepan Fedak (1922);
- the Olha Basarab case (1924), representing her family and defending co-defendant Kovalenko alongside chief defendant Andriy Melnyk (officer);
- the trials of Vasyl Bilas and Dmytro Danylyshyn (1932) and Mykola Lemyk (1933);
- the 1936 Lviv trial of OUN leadership, in which he defended his cousin Roman Shukhevych and Bohdan Hnatevych.

From 1921 to 1939, Shukhevych served as president of the supervisory board of the Chervona Kalyna publishing cooperative in Lviv, which published historical studies, memoirs, and periodicals documenting the Ukrainian struggle for independence.

== Later years and death ==
Following the outbreak of World War II and the Soviet annexation of Eastern Galicia and Volhynia in September 1939, Shukhevych relocated to Kraków in German-occupied Poland, where he continued practicing law. Near the end of the war in 1945, he evacuated westward to Germany, dying on 6 June 1945 in Amberg in the American occupation zone.

== Personal life and legacy ==
Shukhevych was married to Ivanna Fedorovych-Shukhevych, with whom he had a daughter, Stefaniia Shukhevych-Strokon. Streets in Ivano-Frankivsk (named in honor of the Shukhevych family) and Dolyna (which also named him an honorary citizen posthumously) commemorate him.

== Selected works ==
- Spomyny z Ukrainskoi-Halytskoi armii (1918–1920) (Memoirs from the Ukrainian Galician Army, Vols. I–V, Lviv: Chervona Kalyna, 1929)
- Hirkyi to smikh (A Bitter Laugh, Lviv, 1930)
- Moie zhyttia: Spohady (My Life: Memoirs, London: Ukrainian Publishers, 1991)
- Vydysh, brate mii (You See, My Brother, Lviv: Apriori, 2024, ISBN 978-617-629-849-6)
