= Hnat Stefaniv =

- Гнат Стефанів
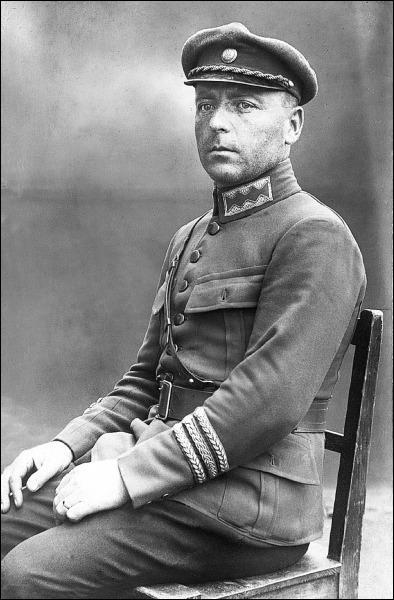
- Hnat Stefaniv
- Born: May 2, 1895; Toporivtsi
- Died: June 21, 1949 (aged 54); Germany
- Military career
- Branch: Ukrainian Galician Army
- Rank: Colonel
- Unit: Hutsul regiment
- Commands: Zolochiv
- Conflicts: First Winter Campaign

Hnat Stefaniv (Ukrainian: Гнат Стефанів; born 2 May 1895 – died 21 June 1949) was a colonel of the Ukrainian Galician Army and the army of the Ukrainian People's Republic.

== Career ==
Born in the village of Toporivtsi near Horodenka, Stefaniv rose to the rank of major in the Austro-Hungarian Army. In the November retreat of 1918, he was the organizer and commandant of the Zolochiv area in the Western Ukrainian National Republic. In 1918, he was elevated to the rank of colonel and commanded the Ukrainian Army in Lwów.

Under his leadership, the Ukrainian forces fought the Polish forces in Lwów, but after the arrival of reinforcements were forced to leave the city November 22. Later he joined the army of the UNR where he commanded the Hutsul regiment, the additional brigade of the rifleman's division and the commander of the cavalry in the First Winter Campaign. In 1920 he became the commander in exile of the Ukrainian armies.

In 1920 he went over with a group under General Anton Kraus to Czechoslovakia and there headed the diplomatic mission of the West Ukrainian People's Republic in Uzhhorod.

== Later life and death ==
Until 1939 he lived in Transcarpathia, then in Vienna, and from 1944 - in Germany, where he died.

== Sources ==
- Volodymyr Kubiyovych (editor-in-chief), Encyclopedia of Ukraine
