= Zenon Kossak =

Ukrainian nationalist militant (1907–1939)

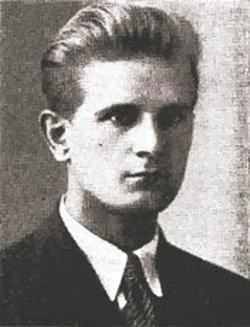
- Native name: Зенон Коссак
- Born: 1 April 1907; Drohobych, Galicia-Lodomeria, Austria-Hungary (now Ukraine)
- Died: 19 March 1939 (aged 31) Solotvyno, Subcarpathia Governorate, Hungary (now Ukraine)
- Cause of death: Execution by firing squad
- Allegiance: OUN; Carpatho-Ukraine
- Rank: Poruchnyk
- Conflicts: Hungarian invasion of Carpatho-Ukraine (executed)

Zenon Kossak (Ukrainian: Зенон Коссак; 1 April 1907 – 19 March 1939) was an activist in the Ukrainian militant nationalist movement for independence from interwar Poland.

Kossak was born in Drohobych in Galicia (then part of the Austro-Hungarian Empire, now in Ukraine). He studied law at Lviv University and was one of the organizers of the nationalist movement in Galicia. Kossak was a member of the Ukrainian Military Organization in the late 1920s and later directed the activities of the Organization of Ukrainian Nationalists (OUN). In 1932, Kossak was arrested for his complicity in the murder of Tadeusz Hołówko. In 1934, he was found guilty and sentenced to 8 years in prison. He was released under an amnesty in 1938.

In 1939 Kossak served as a member of OUN's Home Executive and became deputy commander of the Carpathian Sich National Defense Organization in Carpatho-Ukraine. There he was taken prisoner and summarily executed by Hungarian troops in Solotvyna, near Bukshtyn, in Transcarpathia. Also shot was his superior, Mykhailo Kolodzinskyi, and a number of other Sich Riflemen.

Kossak wrote the 44 rules of a Ukrainian Nationalist.

== Sources ==
- from the Encyclopedia of Ukraine
