= Osyp Kurylas =

Ukrainian painter (1870–1951)

- Осип Курилас
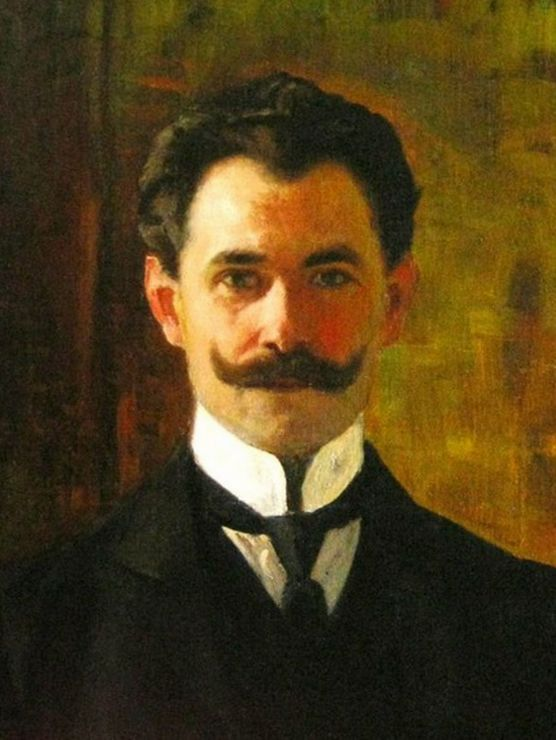
- Kurylas's Self-Portrait (1901)
- Born: 7 August 1870; Shchyrets, Galicia-Lodomeria, Austria-Hungary (now Ukraine)
- Died: 25 July 1951 (aged 80); Lviv, Ukrainian SSR, Soviet Union (now Ukraine)
- Resting place: Lychakiv Cemetery
- Education: Lviv Industrial Design School; Kraków Academy of Fine Arts
- Military career
- Allegiance: Austria-Hungary
- Unit: Ukrainian Sich Riflemen
- Conflicts: World War I

Osyp Petrovych Kurylas (Ukrainian: О́сип Петро́вич Курила́с; 7 August 1870 – 25 June 1951) was a Ukrainian painter and graphic artist best known for his depictions of Hutsuls and postcards depicting the Ukrainian Sich Riflemen, among other works.

== Biography ==
Osyp Petrovych Kurylas was born 7 August 1870 in the settlement of Shchyrets, in what was then Austria-Hungary. He first graduated from the Lviv Industrial Design School (now the Ivan Trush Lviv State College of Decorative and Applied Arts) in 1890 or 1892 before later studying at the Academy of Fine Arts in Kraków, graduating in 1900. In Kraków, he studied under Polish painters Leon Wyczółkowski and Jacek Malczewski, and he became a member of the Lviv-based Society for Development of Ruthenian Shtuky in 1898.

In early works, Kurylas focused heavily on social issues, such as orphans and the homeless. He was active in painting commissioned portraits, the money of which he spent on a trip to culturally-significant European cities in 1903. He married his wife, the Polish Valeriia Skorkhan, in 1906. Two years later, he produced some of his most popular works, including portraits of Taras Shevchenko, Ivan Kotliarevsky, and Ukraine's hetmans. He also illustrated Mykola Arkas's History of Ukraine.

After the beginning of World War I Kurylas joined the Ukrainian Sich Riflemen. In addition to being an infantryman of the Sich, he was also head of the art department of the group's press service, and produced several popular postcards depicting the Sich. With the end of World War I Kurylas became a teacher at Oleksa Novakivskyi's Art School, and, following Novakivskyi's 1935 death, he became the school's director, continuing to work until 1939.

Kurylas's works during the interwar period covered several different fields, such as illustrations for children's literature, religious paintings, and illustrations for periodicals and newspapers. He also painted several icons, which have since appeared in Poland, Canada, and the United States, as well as Ukraine. In the final years of his life, his paintings were closer to themes of Ukrainian nationalism and patriotism.

Kurylas died on 25 June 1951 in Lviv. He was buried in the city's Lychakiv Cemetery.
