= Ukrainian Galician Army =

Army of the West Ukrainian People's Republic

- Українська галицька армія
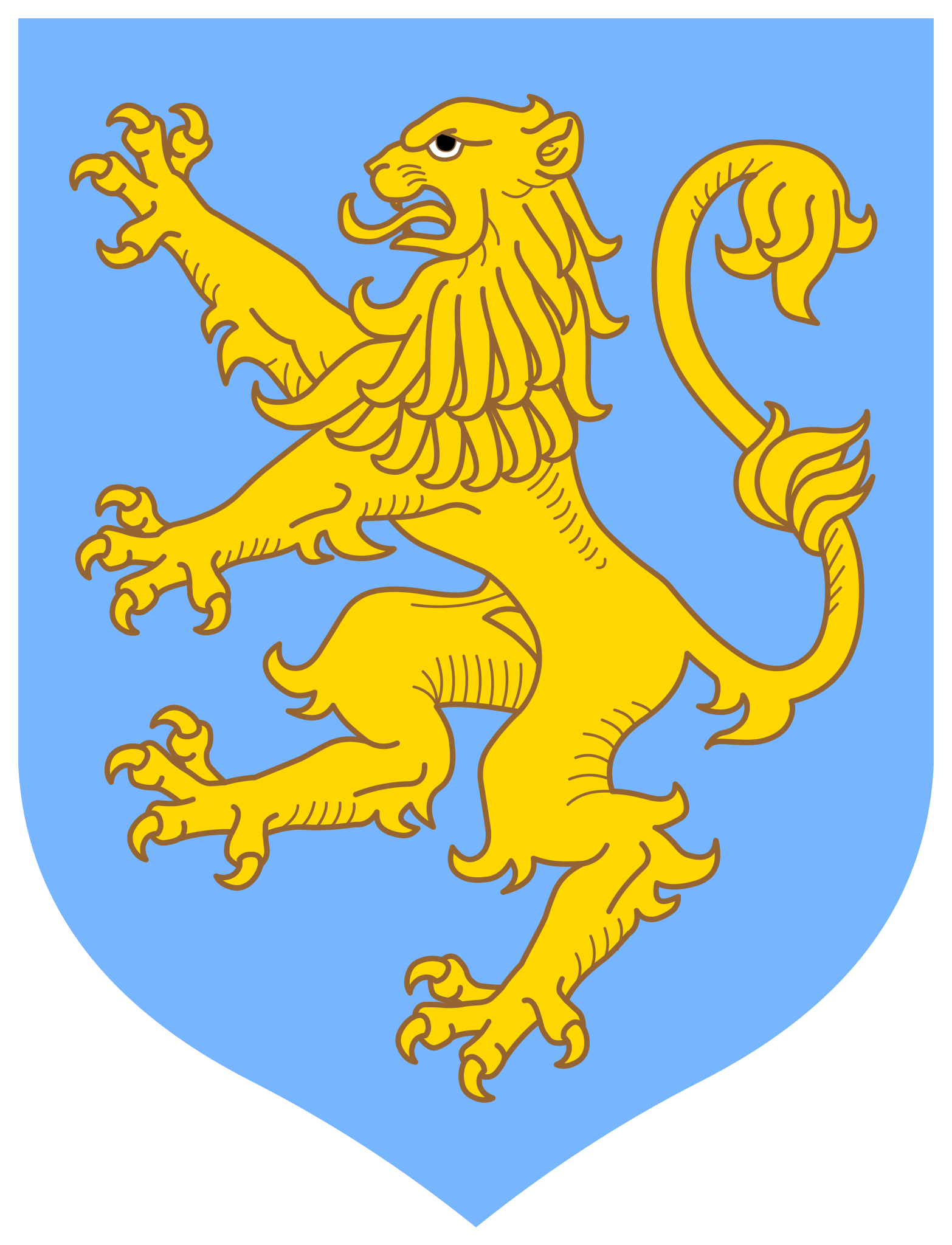
- Active: 1918–1920
- Country: West Ukrainian People's Republic
- Allegiance: West Ukrainian People's Republic; Ukrainian People's Republic (1919); South Russia (1919-1920); Ukrainian SSR (1920)
- Type: Army aviation Cavalry; Infantry
- Role: Aerial reconnaissance Aerial warfare Artillery observer Charge; Close air support Cold-weather warfare Combined arms Counter-battery fire Direct fire Fire support Human wave attack HUMINT; Indirect fire Intelligence assessment Military communications Military engineering Military intelligence Military logistics Mountain warfare Raiding; Reconnaissance; Shock tactics Tactical bombing Trench warfare
- Size: 100,000 personnel at its peak
- Engagements: Ukrainian War of Independence; Russian Civil War; Ukrainian–Soviet War; Polish–Ukrainian War; Polish–Soviet War

Commanders
- Commander: see below

The Ukrainian Galician Army (abbr. UGA; Ukrainian: Українська галицька армія [УГА], romanized: Ukrainska halytska armiia [UHA]), was the combined military of the West Ukrainian People's Republic during and after the Polish-Ukrainian War. It was called the Galician army initially.

The Ukrainian Galician Army obtained its arms from Austrian depots and from the demobilized Austrian and German troops who streamed through Galicia by the hundreds of thousands following the collapse of the Central Powers at the end of World War I. However, the centers of Austria's military industry lay far from Galicia, and subsequent difficulty with resupply was a major factor in the Galicians losing their war against Poland.

== History ==
=== Polish-Ukrainian War ===
The Galician army was formed on the base of the Ukrainian Sich Riflemen Legion and other ethnic Ukrainian units of the Austro-Hungarian Army, which were subjected to the Ukrainian National Council and took part in the November Uprising in Lviv. According to a 13 November 1918 law adopted by the Ukrainian National Council, general mobilization of men aged between 18 and 35 was proclaimed in the whole territory controlled by the West Ukrainian Republic, with three military districts being organized in Lviv, Ternopil and Stanislaviv. The army was subordinated to the State Secretariat of Military Affairs initially headed by Dmytro Vitovsky. Head of the Ukrainian National Council served as the commander-in-chief of the Galician Army.

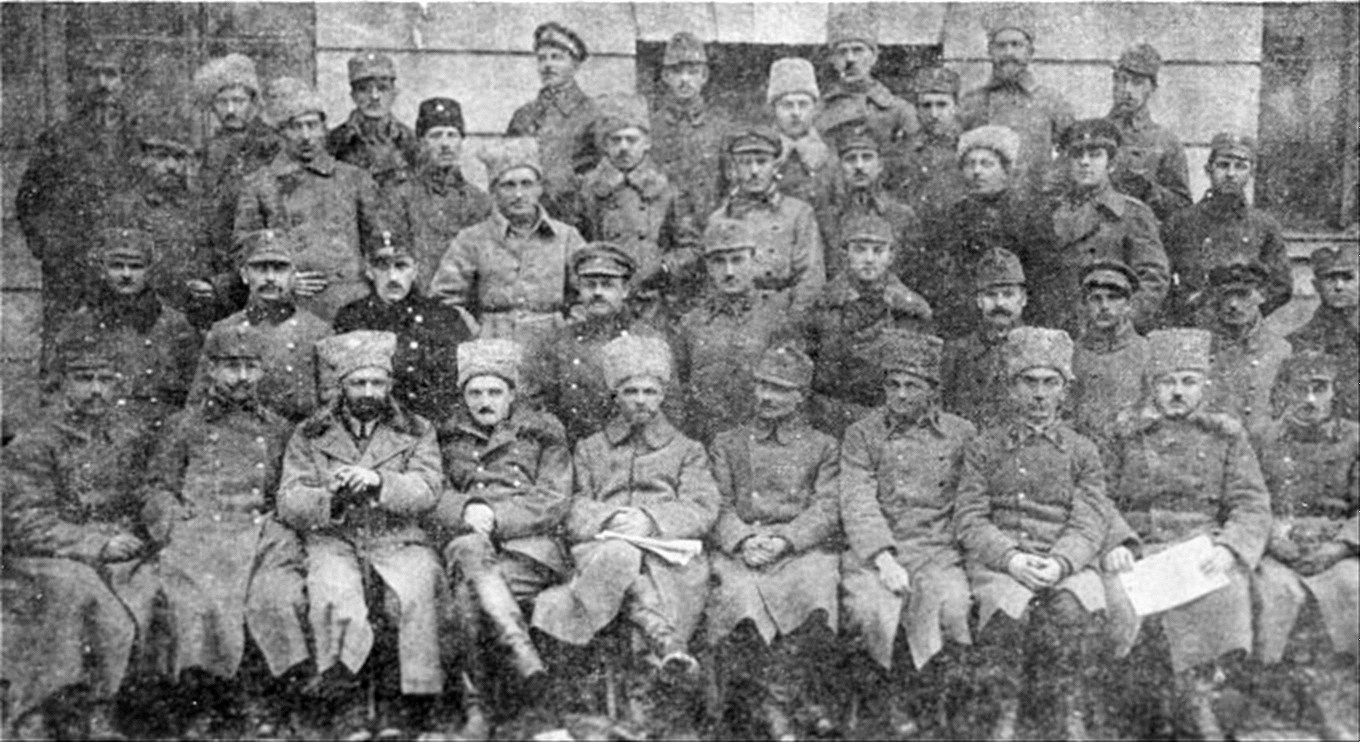
The Supreme Command of the Ukrainian Galician Army. Sitting, 5th through 7th from left, Gen Mykhailo Omelianovych-Pavlenko, Col Viktor Kurmanovych, and Otaman Alfred Schamanek.

Initially the army consisted of a mix of regular, semi-regular and guerrilla troops. By early December 1918 it counted approximately 30,000 soldiers and 40 artillery pieces and held a front running from Cisna in the southwest through Khyriv, Peremyshl, Lviv, Yavoriv, Liubachiv, Rava-Ruska and Belz to Kryliv in the north. In early 1919 all of the army's battle groups were united into corps. Thousands of soldiers serving in the Austrian army, including those taken prisoner during the First World War, were also mobilized. By April 1919 the Galician army had 1412 officers and 52,200 soldiers, but was still outnumbered by Polish troops. Despite this, the Ukrainian forces could achieve a number of victories, but their successful offensive was stopped due to a ceasefire introduced by an Entente mission.

After simultaneous offensives by Polish and Romanian forces in May 1919, parts of the army had to retreat to Carpatho-Ukraine, meanwhile the rest attempted a counteroffensive, which failed due to lack of equipment. As a result, on 28 June 1919 the army started a retreat across the Zbruch river, into the territory of the Ukrainian People's Republic.

=== War against the Bolsheviks ===
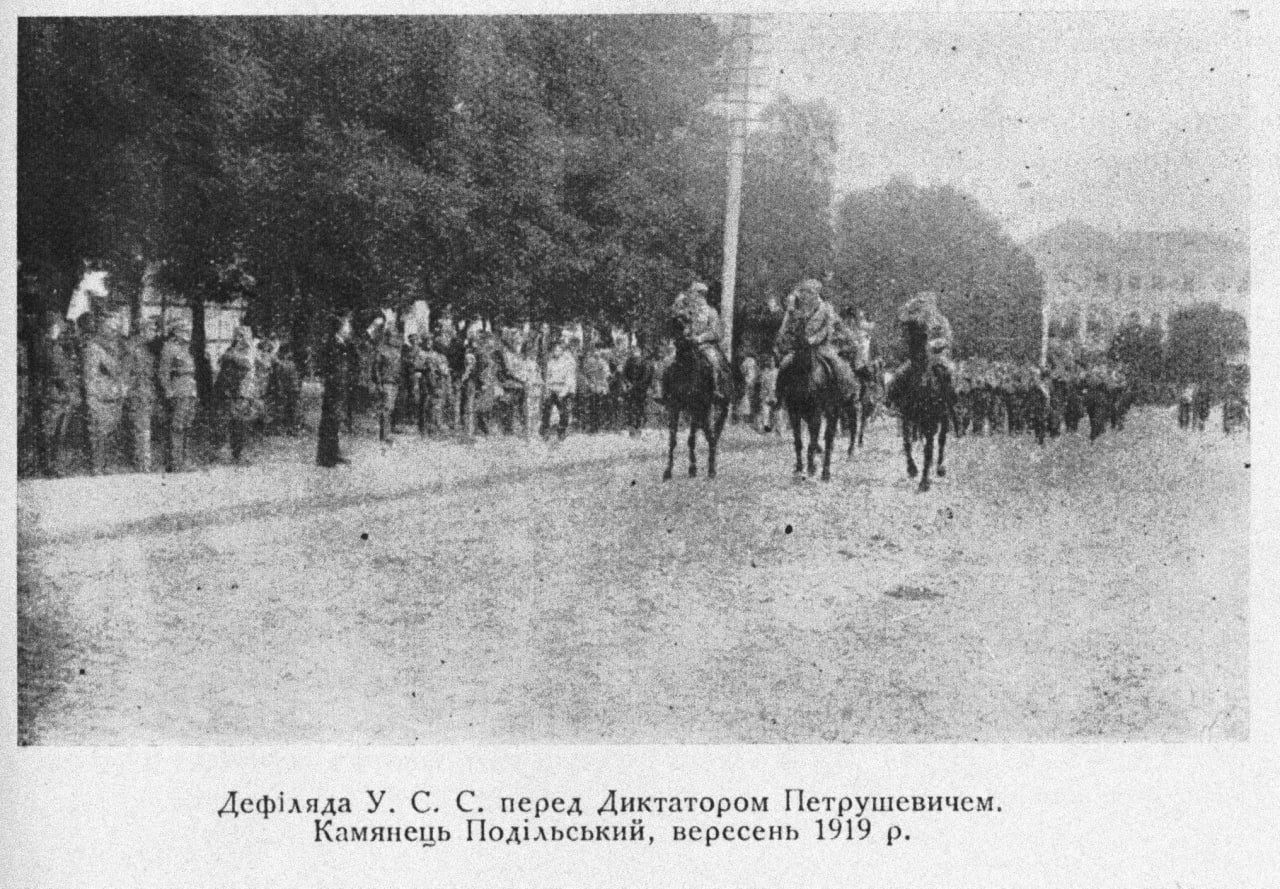
Parade of the Galician Army's 1st Sich Riflemen brigade in Kamianets-Podilskyi, September 1919

In late July - early August 1919 the Galician Army moved to the anti-Bolshevik front, and on 12 August joined the offensive of Ukrainian armies into the direction of Kyiv and Odesa. On 30 August Ukrainian forces entered Kyiv, but next day had to retreat due to the simultaneous entry of the White Army into the city.

Following a typhus epidemic, by November 1919 only 7% of the army's soldiers remained on the front. As a result, the Galician command signed an armistice, and soon thereafter an alliance treaty with the Volunteer Army of Anton Denikin, becoming known as "Ukrainian Galician Army". The alliance was supported by mutual interests of both sides: the Whites aimed to use the Galician troops as a resource in their fight against the Bolsheviks, and, in perspective, against the newly created Polish Republic; the Galician Army, meanwhile, received a chance to rest and hoped to access resources of the Entente in preparation for their expected fight against Poland in Galicia.

Galician troops were subjected to the operative command of Nikolai Shilling, who headed Denikin's forces in New Russia region, but particular units continued to be led by their previous commanders. Contacts between the two armies were facilitated by the fact, than many officers in both of them spoke German and were themselves of German or Austrian origin. According to the agreement, part of Galician Army's soldiers ill with typhus were directed for treatment to Odesa, which was then controlled by the Whites, where they met fellow Ukrainians taken prisoner or hiding. This led to a resurgence of Ukrainian cultural life in the city, including the opening of Prosvita societies, and a secret Ukrainian committee emerged with plans to use Galician troops in order to capture Odesa and the surrounding region. During an anti-White uprising organized by left-wing forces in early February 1920, soldiers of the Galician Army established contacts with local Borotbists and took part in patrolling of the city, preserving official neutrality.

=== Incorporation by the Red Army and dissolution ===
Following the defeat of the Whites by the Bolsheviks, Galician troops joined the Red Army under the name of "Red Ukrainian Galician Army". At the time 5000 active soldiers of the army were stationed in Podillia, meanwhile over 15,000 were ill with typhus. Reorganization of the army was performed by Volodymyr Zatonsky, who appointed Galician Communist Vasyl Poraiko as its new commander. The previous command was arrested, transported to Moscow and eventually executed. Additionally, a revolutionary tribunal was established in the army.

On 13 February 1920 a brigade consisting of Galician Ukrainians was formed by local Red Army command in Odesa, however, on 6 March the decision was abolished. Following the participation of Galician soldiers in a demonstration dedicated to the birthday of Taras Shevchenko, during which they carried blue-and-yellow flags and sang the national anthem, the Bolsheviks ordered Galicians to leave Odesa and rejoin the rest of the "Red Galician Army" in Podillia.

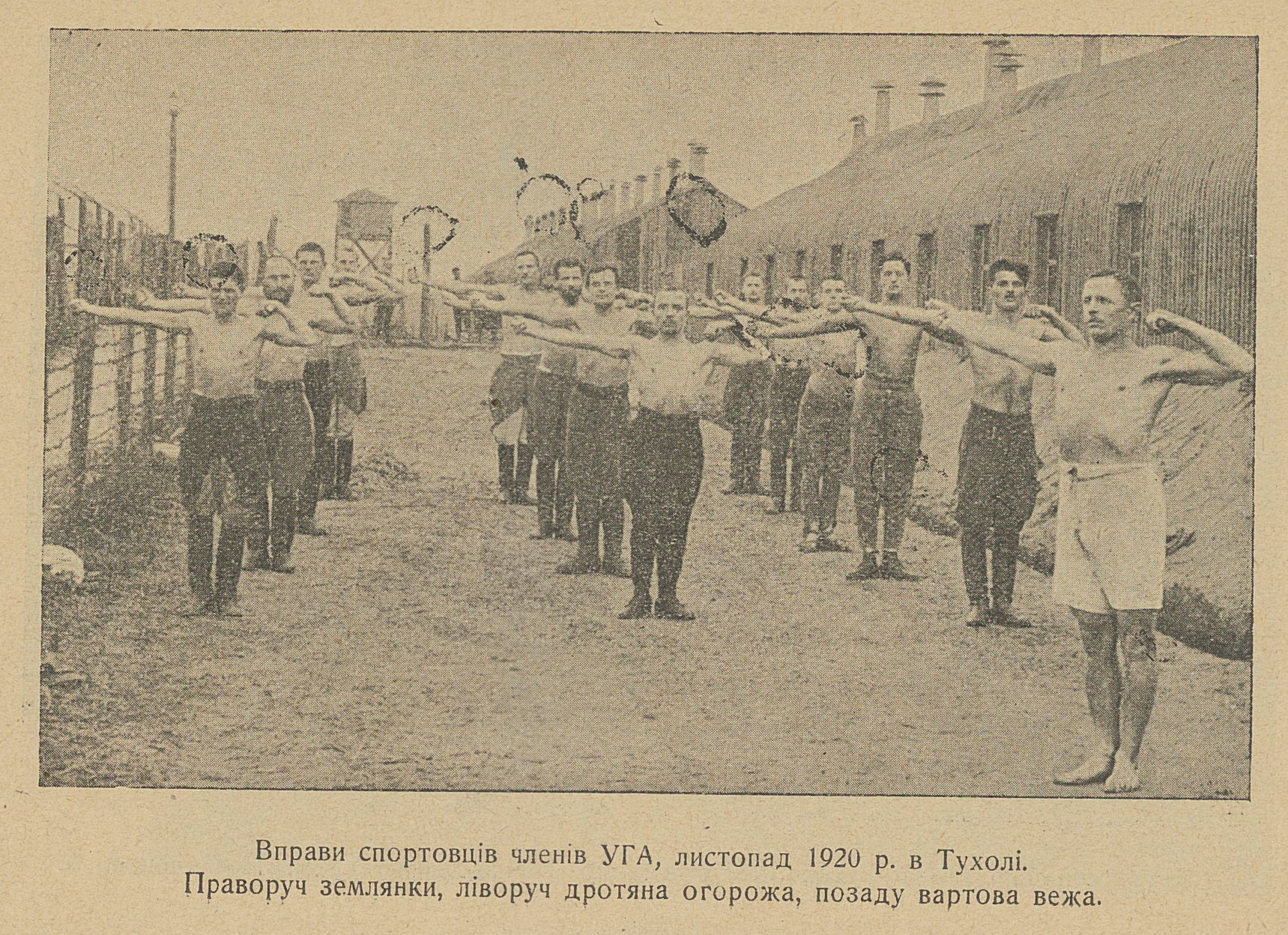
Captured Galician Army soldiers in Tuchola, 1920

Following the reformation of the army's brigades, its units were allocated to the 12th and 14th Soviet armies, disrupting its unified structure. The new command engaged in Communist propaganda of class struggle, and the soldiers were forbidden to use Ukrainian national symbols and previous military awards. This contributed to the growth of anti-Bolshevik views among the staff.

In April 1920 two brigades of the "Red Galician Army" army left the Reds in order to rejoin the forces of the Ukrainian People's Republic, which were then in alliance with Poland. Only one Galician brigade continued fighting against the Poles as part of the 44th Tarashcha division of the Red Army, but was defeated near Makhnivka, with most of its officers being interned by Polish authorities in Tuchola. The desertion of Galician brigades led to repressions against those of its members who remained in Bolshevik-controlled territory, and many of its officers were executed. As a result, the Galician Army de-facto ceased to exist.

== Armed Forces ==
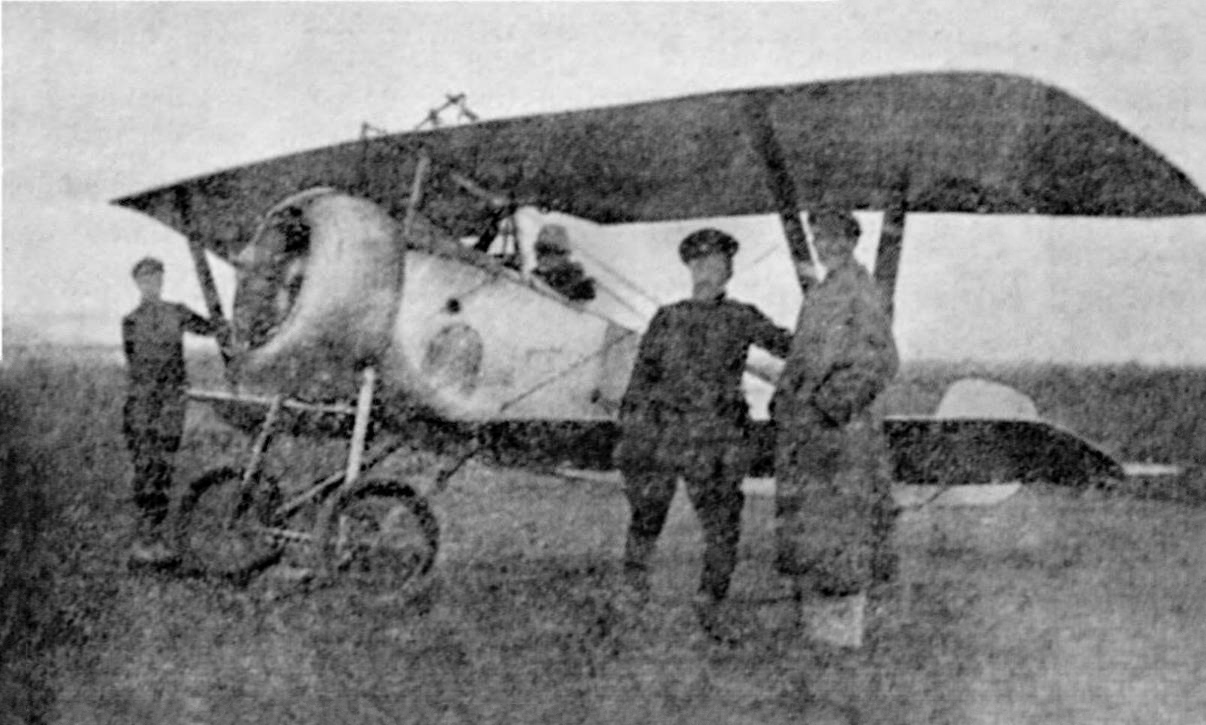
Nieuport 17 of the Ukrainian Galician Army

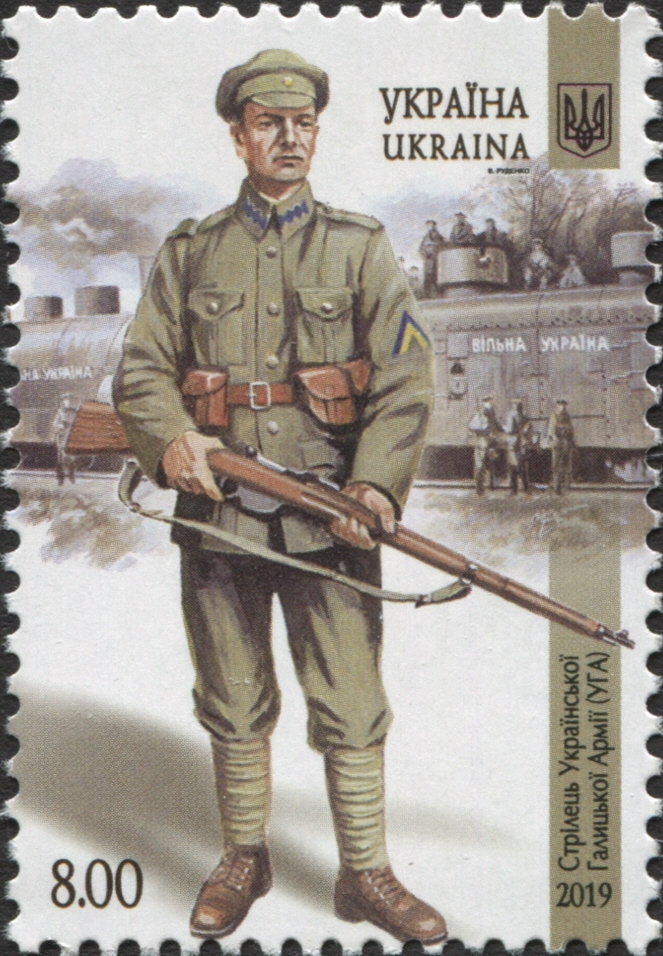
Rifleman of the Ukrainian Galician Army on a modern post stamp

The government of the West Ukrainian People's Republic was well organized and was able to mobilize over 100,000 people by spring 1919, 40,000 of whom were battle-ready. Due to the Ukrainians' generally poor socioeconomic status, the army had a disproportionately low ratio of officers to other ranks. In the Austro-Hungarian Army, ethnic Ukrainians accounted for only two out of 1,000 officers (in comparison, Poles had made up 27/1,000 officers in the Austrian military).

As a result, although most of the junior rank officers were Galicians the government of the West Ukrainian People's Republic relied largely on former high-ranking officers of the defunct Russian Army, such as General Mykhailo Omelianovych-Pavlenko, to take on the post of commander and general staff. It also staffed many positions with unemployed Austrian and German officers. For this reason, the German language was the easiest way for officers to communicate with each other and was the dominant language among the staff. Despite these measures, only approximately 2.4% of the army consisted of officers.

The Ukrainian Galician Army reached its greatest strength in June 1919, when it had 70,000 to 75,000 men, including reserves. It had very limited cavalry but artillery, consisting of ex-Austrian pieces, was a strong point. The UHA had two or three armored cars and two armored trains. The UHA's air force, organized by Petro Franko (son of the poet Ivan Franko), fielded 40 airplanes, and until April 1919 enjoyed air superiority over the Polish forces.

=== Sich Riflemen ===
A former unit of the Austro-Hungarian Army, the 1st Brigade of Sich Riflemen (Січові Стрільці), became the elite force of the Ukrainian Galician Army during the war against Poland. It was formed in 1914 by former members of youth and paramilitary organizations and fought in Galicia and Ukraine against the Russian Empire throughout the First World War. At its peak this brigade had 8,600 men, not all of whom fought in Galicia.

=== Jewish Battalion ===
The Ukrainian Galician Army fielded a Jewish battalion (Жидівський Курінь УГА) recruited from Jewish university and high school students in Ternopil and led by Lieutenant Solomon Leimberg. Formed in June 1919, it attained a strength of 1,200 men and participated in combat against Polish forces in July 1919 and subsequently against the Bolsheviks. The battalion was decimated by a typhus epidemic in late 1919 and its surviving soldiers were subsequently reassigned to other units within the Ukrainian Galician Army.

== Structure ==
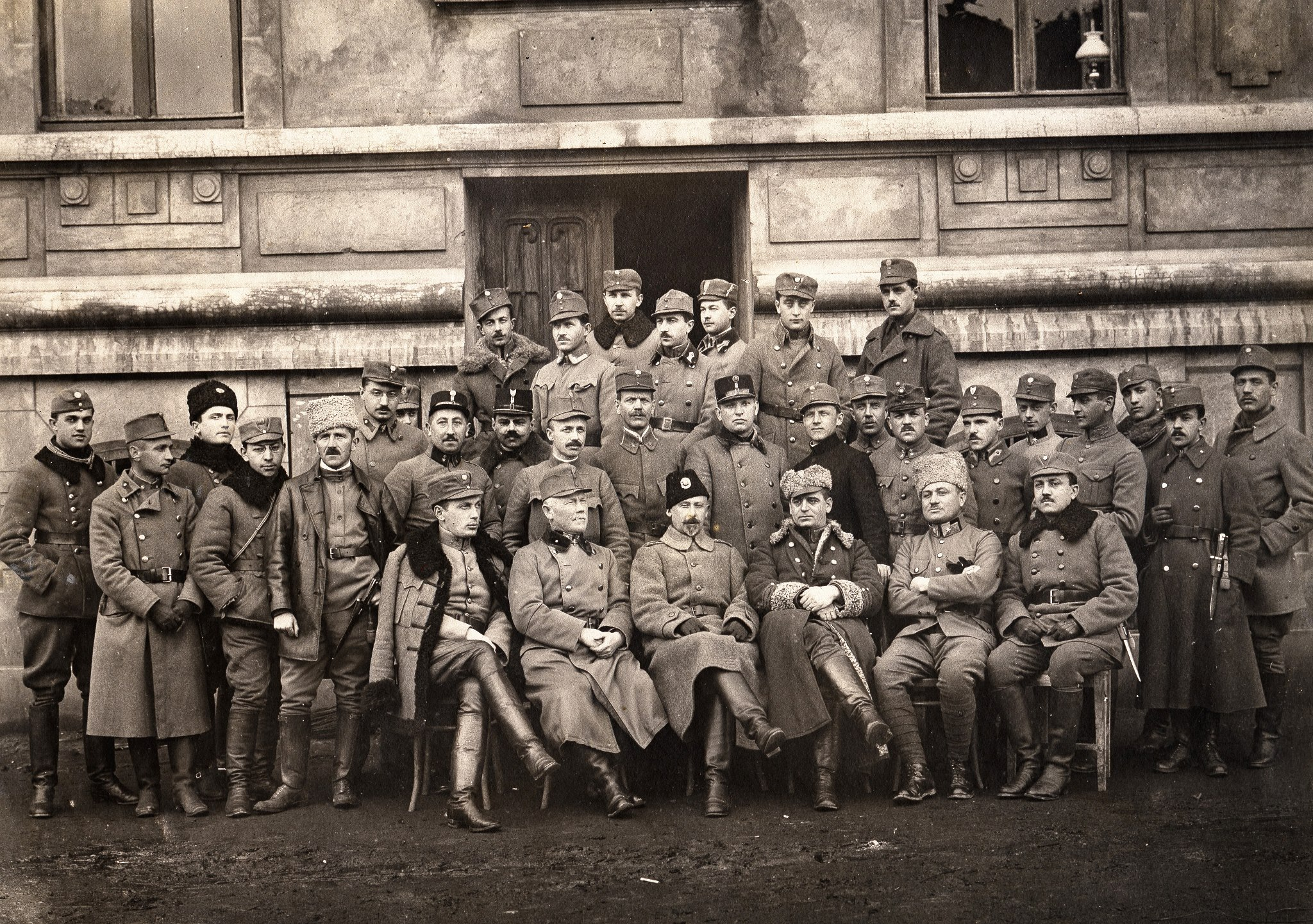
Command of the 3rd UGA corps in Stryi, January 1919

The Army consisted of numerous military formations which later were organized into four Corps. The Corps were further divided into brigades composed of several regular military units.

- I Galician Corps
  - 5th Sokal Brigade
  - 6th Rava Brigade
  - 9th Uhniv-Belz Brigade
  - 10th Yavoriv Brigade
- II Galician Corps
  - 1st Brigade of the Legion of Ukrainian Sich Riflemen
  - 2nd Kolomyia Brigade
  - 3rd Berezhany Brigade
  - 4th Zolochiv Brigade
- III Galician Corps
  - 1st Mountainous Brigade
  - 7th Stryi Brigade
  - 8th Sambir Brigade
  - Battle groups "Krukevychi" and "Hlyboka", reformed into 11th Stryi Brigade
  - 14th Brigade (later)
- IV Galician Corps
  - 12th Brigade
  - 13th Brigade
  - 15th Brigade
  - 18th Ternopil Brigade
  - 21st Zbarazh Brigade
- V Galician Corps
  - 16th Chortkiv Brigade
  - 17th Buchach Brigade
  - 19th Brigade
  - 20th Brigade
- Galician Air Regiment

Territorially the West Ukrainian People's Republic was divided into three Military Oblasts centered in Lviv, Ternopil, and Stanyslaviv, with four okruhas (districts) in each.

== Supreme command ==
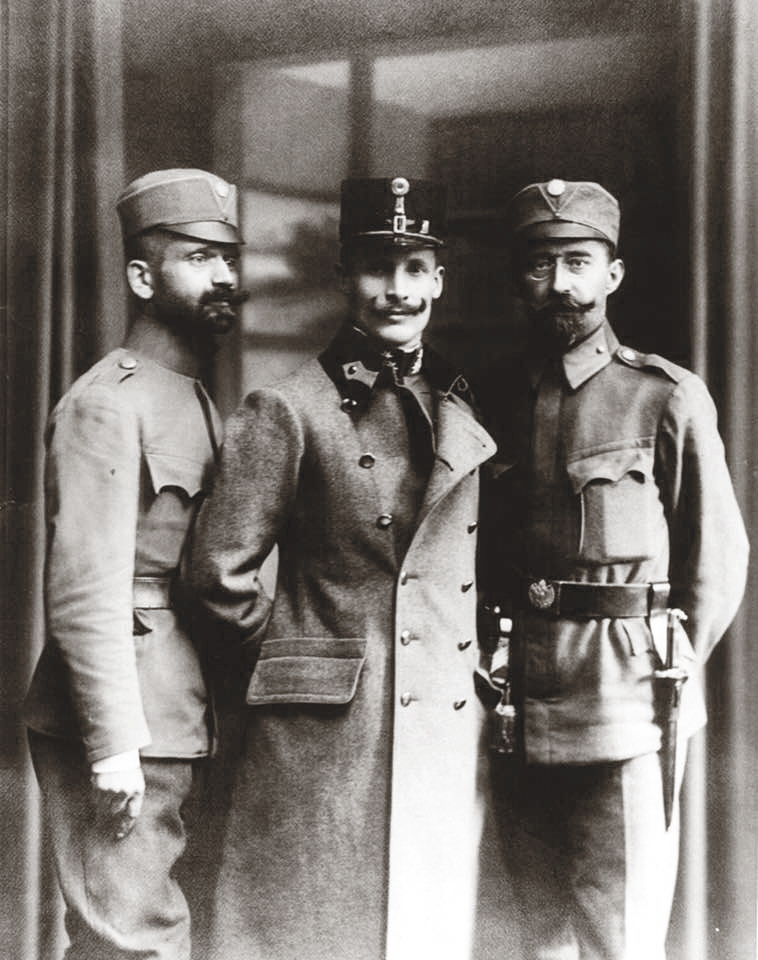
Dmytro Vitovsky, first commander of the Ukrainian Galician Army, flanked by two officers, 1918

=== Commanders-in-chief ===
- Dmytro Vitovsky (1-5 November 1918) - organizer of the Ukrainian uprising in Lviv and special operations formations, later a member of Western Ukrainian delegation to the Paris Peace Conference in May 1919;
- Hryhoriy Kossak (5-9 November 1918);
- Hnat Stefaniv (9 November - 10 December 1918) - later commander of the Ukrainian army in exile;
- Mykhailo Omelianovych-Pavlenko (10 December 1918 - 9 June 1919) - Supreme Commander, later defence minister of the Ukrainian People's Republic's government-in-exile;
- Oleksander Hrekov (9 June - 5 July 1919) - ethnic Russian former Tsarist general, architect of the Chortkiv offensive;
- Myron Tarnavsky (5 July - 7 November 1919) - supreme commander of the Ukrainian Galician Army during its successful anti-Bolshevik offensive on Kiev; court-martialed for signing an agreement with Anton Denikin;
- Osyp Mykytka (7 November 1919 - 12 February 1920) - subordinated the army to Armed Forces of South Russia, removed from post and arrested by a Bolshevik-influenced revolutionary committee of soldiers;
- Ambroziy Vitoshynskyi (21 February - 1 March 1920) - headed the army under Bolshevik command.

=== Chiefs of staff ===
- Mykola Marynovych (2-5 November 1918);
- Semen Goruk (5 November - 10 December 1918);
- Yevhen Myshkovsky (10 December 1918 - 13 February 1919);
- Viktor Kurmanovych (13 February - 8 June 1919);
- Karl Stipschitz-Ternawa (8 June-5 July 1919)
- Alfred Schamanek (5 July - 7 November 1919);
- Gustav Ziritz (7 November 1919 - 10 February 1920);
- Alfred Schamanek (10 February - 22 March 1920).

== Other members ==
- Archduke Wilhelm of Austria, Austrian Archduke
- Petro Franko, son of Ukrainian writer Ivan Franko
- Yevhen Konovalets, founder and first leader of the Organization of Ukrainian Nationalists
- Bohuslav Shashkevych, who served as a major and commander of the 9th UHA Infantry Brigade, and later the 21st and 4th UHA Infantry Brigades
- Solomon Leimberg, lieutenant of the Jewish battalion (Жидівський Курінь УГА) since June 1919
- Stepan Shukhevych, commander of the 3rd (Berezhany) brigade

== See also ==
- Polish-Ukrainian war
- Ukrainian-Soviet war
- West Ukrainian People's Republic
- Western Ukraine
- Austrian Galicia
- Polish-Ukrainian relations

== Sources ==
- Subtelny, Orest (1988). Ukraine: A History. Toronto: University of Toronto Press. ISBN 0-8020-5808-6.
- A web site including information about the Ukrainian Galician army
- Західно-Українська Народна Республіка 1918–1923. Енциклопедія. Т. 1: А–Ж. Івано-Франківськ : Манускрипт-Львів, 2018. 688 с. ISBN 978-966-2067-44-6 (Ukrainian)
- Західно-Українська Народна Республіка 1918–1923. Енциклопедія. Т. 2: З–О. Івано-Франківськ : Манускрипт-Львів, 2019. 832 с. ISBN 978-966-2067-61-3 (Ukrainian)
- Західно-Українська Народна Республіка 1918-1923. Енциклопедія. Т. 3: П - С. Івано-Франківськ: Манускрипт-Львів, 2020.576 с. ISBN 978-966-2067-65-1 (Ukrainian)
- Західно-Українська Народна Республіка 1918-1923. Енциклопедія. Т. 4: Т - Я. Івано-Франківськ: Манускрипт-Львів, 2021.688 с. ISBN 978-966-2067-72-9 (Ukrainian)
