= Proskuriv offensive =

1919 offensive

- Part of Ukrainian-Soviet War
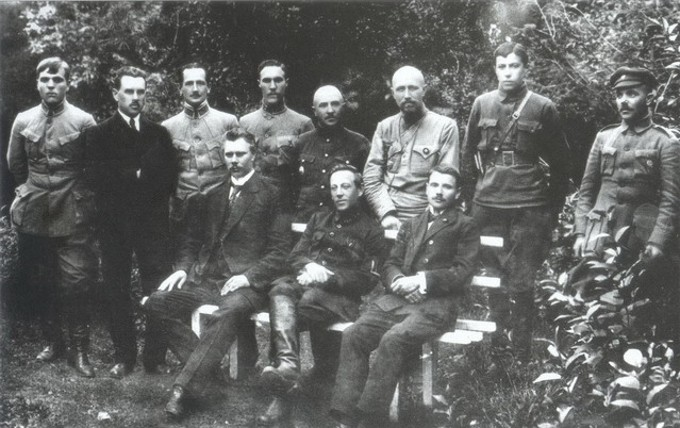
- Members of the Ukrainian People's Republic Directory in Kamianets-Podilskyi, which was captured during the offensive
Date	1 June – 16 July 1919
Location	Podolia, Ukrainian People's Republic
Result	Ukrainian victory Full results: Beginning of the anti-Soviet campaign in Ukraine; Red Army offensive towards Soviet Hungary halted

Belligerents
Ukrainian People's Republic	Russian SFSR; Ukrainian SSR

Commanders and leaders
Symon Petliura; Oleksandr Udovychenko; Volodymyr Salsky; Vasyl Tiutiunnyk	Vladimir Antonov-Ovseenko; Nikolai Semyonov

Casualties and losses
Heavy	Heavy: 30 cannons captured; 700 wagons captured

The Proskuriv offensive or Proskuriv breakthrough (Ukrainian: Проскурівський прорив) was a major military operation carried by the Ukrainian People's Army against the Bolshevik forces in June of 1919 as a part of the Soviet-Ukrainian War. The operation was successful and resulted in a seizure of large parts of Western Podolia by the People's Army, capture of Kamianets-Podilskyi and its proclamation as a temporary capital of the Ukrainian People's Republic.

== Background ==
In 1919 the Red Army and its allies launched a full-scale invasion of Ukraine, which was weakened by an internal conflict that has followed the overthrow of hetman Pavlo Skoropadsky. On 5 of February, the Bolsheviks captured Kiev and as of May 1919, most of Ukraine came under Soviet control, while the Ukrainian forces were surrounded between the Soviet and Polish armies. However the situation on the captured Ukrainian territory was unstable – in May of 1919 the Green insurgents led by Nykyfor Hryhoriv launched a major uprising against the Soviet rule in Ukraine. UPR government at the time managed to reorganise the Ukrainian army into an 11 new divisions. Vasyl Tyutyunnyk created a plan of breakthrough against the Soviet forces, with the initial goal of the operation being to reach the Starokostiantyniv-Derezhnya-Nova Ushytsia line.

== Offensive ==
On June 1, otaman Symon Petliura ordered the Ukrainian forces to begin a full-scale offensive against the Bolsheviks and on 2 of June, the Ukrainians had reaches the Volytsia Vonsovychia−Katerynivka−Pakhutyntsi line. Despite the successes of the offensive, Ukrainian forces behind the Zbruch river had faced problems due to the Polish capture of Tarnopol. On 3 of June, the UPR troops captured Volochysk and Chornyi Ostriv, while the Ukrainian 3rd Riflemen division defeated the Soviets near Skala, captured Kamianets-Podilskyi and repelled the Soviet counterattacks. On 4 of June, Bolshevik troops launched a counteroffensive against the Ukrainian Zaporozhian Corps, but were repelled. In response, the Ukrainian units led by sotnyk Demolovskyi launched an offensive on Proskuriv but were quickly defeated despite the initial success. On 5 of June, Bolsheviks launched another offensive against the Ukrainian forces from Shepetivka and Proskurov, but were stopped by Ukrainian counteroffensive, which resulted in a capture of Antoniny station by the Sich riflemen, while the 1st Hutsul regiment captured Felshtyn and Yarmolyntsi. On June 6, the Ukrainian units led by Volodymyr Salsky attacked Proskurov. A fierce battle took place, which resulted in Ukrainian victory and a Bolshevik retreat to Zhmerynka. UPR troops also captured Kostiantyniv. On the next day, the Bolsheviks attacked the city again, a fierce fighting took place. On 11 of June, the Bolsheviks launched a full-scale counteroffensive against the Sich Riflemen and a Volhynian group of the UPR army. Despite the Bolshevik defeat, Ukrainian forces suffered heavy casualties. In mid-June, Ukrainian forces captured Derazhnia and Nova Ushytsia, and on 3 of July, Mohyliv-Podilskyi was captured.

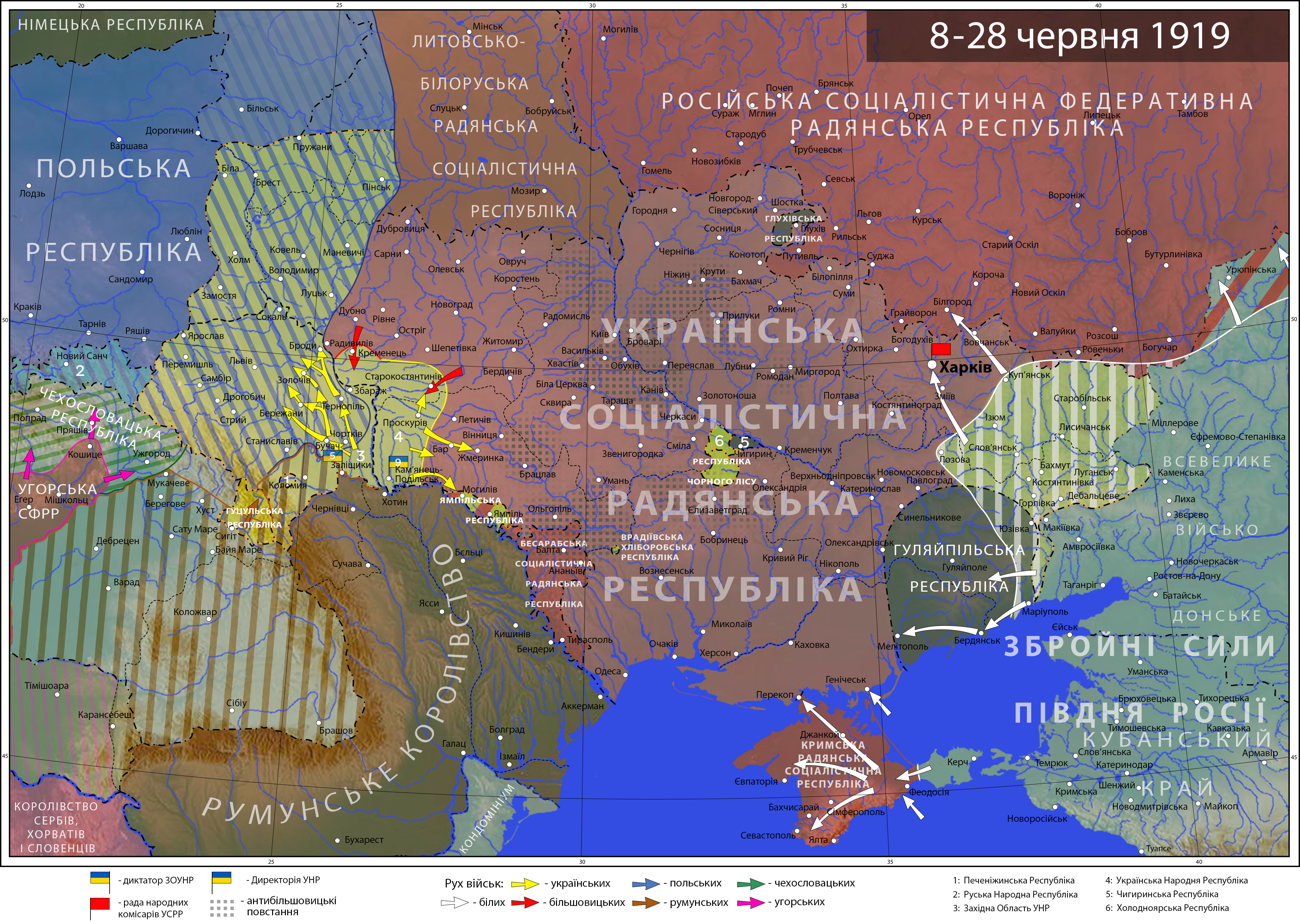
Situation of the Ukrainian People's Army (No.4) after the taking of Proskuriv in mid-June 1919

== Aftermath ==
The offensive was successful, as the Ukrainians managed to advance inside the Soviet-held territory and regain several cities, such as Mohyliv-Podilskyi, Proskuriv, Starokostiantyniv and Kamianets-Podilskyi, which became a temporary capital of the UPR following its liberation on 6 of June. On 16 of July, forces of the Ukrainian Galician Army crossed the Zbruch river following their defeat in the Chortkiv offensive, which allowed to strengthen the Ukrainian army and to launch an offensive towards Kiev and Odessa by the joint Ukrainian armies that ended with a capture of Kiev by the Ukrainians on 30 of August and its seizure by the White Army on the next day, leading to a full-scale military conflict between the UPR and the White Army. The Ukrainian operation also forced the Soviet government to setback its offensive towards Soviet Hungary and Slovakia.

== Bibliography ==
Udovychenko, O. I. (1995). Україна у війні за державність.: Історія організації і бойових дій Українських Збройних Сил 1917—1921. Kyiv.
