= Kopychyntsi =

City in Ternopil Oblast, Ukraine

Kopychyntsi Копичинці Kopyczyńce • קאפיטשיניץ
- City
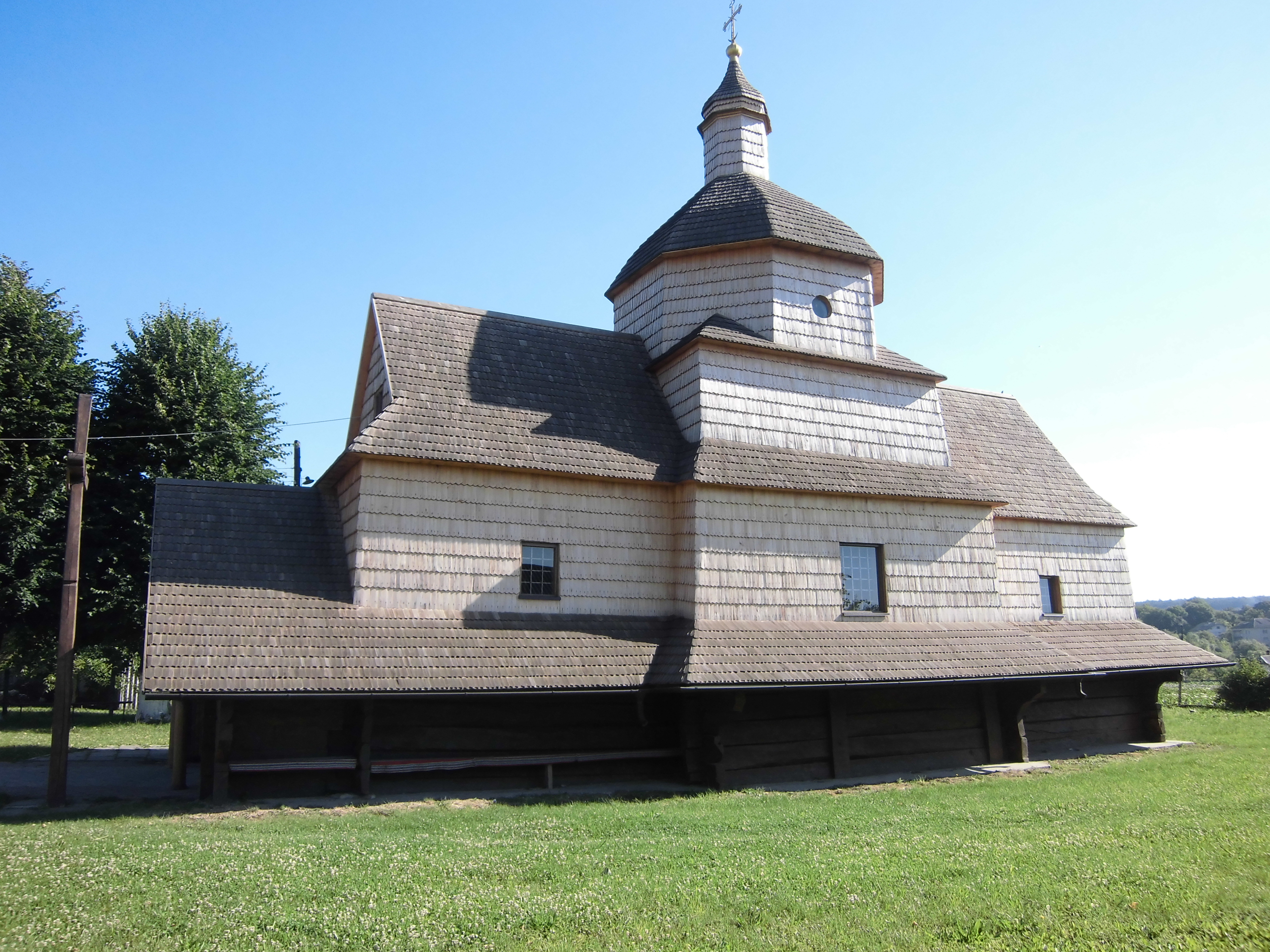
- Church of Exaltation of the Holy Cross

- Coat of arms

- Location within Ternopil Oblast Location within Ukraine
- Coordinates: 49°06′29″N 25°54′46″E
- Country: Ukraine
- Oblast: Ternopil Oblast
- Raion: Chortkiv Raion
- Hromada: Kopychyntsi urban hromada
- First mention: 1443
- Magdeburg Rights: 1564

Government
  - City Mayor: Bogdan Kelichavyi

Population (2023)
  - Total: 7,000
- Time zone: UTC+2 (EET)
  - Summer (DST): UTC+3 (EEST)
- Postal code: 48260
- Area code: +380 3557
- Website: https://kopychyntsi.com.ua

Kopychyntsi (Ukrainian: Копичинці, IPA: [koˈpɪtʃɪnts⁽ʲ⁾i]; Polish: Kopyczyńce; Yiddish: קאפיטשיניץ, romanized: Koptchintz) is a small city in Chortkiv Raion, Ternopil Oblast, Ukraine. It hosts the administration of Kopychyntsi urban hromada, one of the hromadas of Ukraine. Kopychyntsi is the birthplace of Vasyl Ivanchuk, a chess grandmaster; Israel Jacob Kligler, who led the effort of eradicating malaria in Mandatory Palestine; and Pinhas Lavon, an Israeli politician. The population of the town is 7000. The population of Kopychyntsi municipality is 13 965.

== History ==
Historical population
Year	Pop.	±%
1921	7,923	—
1931	8,609	+8.7%
2023	6,502	−24.5%

The city was first mentioned in 1340 as a village in the Polish powiat (county) of Trembowla, lthough the Kingdom of Galicia–Volhynia still formally existed until 1349, Terebovlia and its surrounding areas were part of it.

With time it grew to become a town within Halychyna, itself part of Podole Voivodeship in the Lesser Poland Province of Poland and then the Polish–Lithuanian Commonwealth. It was granted a city charter in 1564. In late 1648, during the Khmelnytsky Uprising, a combined Cossack and Tartar army under Asand Demko seized the town. Local residents joined Bohdan Khmelnytsky uprising. The detachment of local craftsmen was led by the blacksmith Klym Opyr, and later by the saddler Hnat Rosolovych. However, following the Battle of Kopychyntsi of May 12, 1651, in which the Cossacks' forces were defeated by hetman Marcin Kalinowski, it returned to Polish-Lithuanian Commonwealth.

In the effect of the Treaty of Buchach of 1672 the town was ceded to Ottoman Empire, but it returned to Poland after the Treaty of Karlowitz of 1699. Following the Partitions of Poland it became part of Austrian Empire and was then seized by Napoleon Bonaparte who gave it to Russian Empire in the Treaty of Tilsit of 1807. Russian control however ended with the Congress of Vienna which awarded the area back to Austria. It shared the history of the surrounding lands of the Kingdom of Galicia and Lodomeria for the rest of the 19th century.

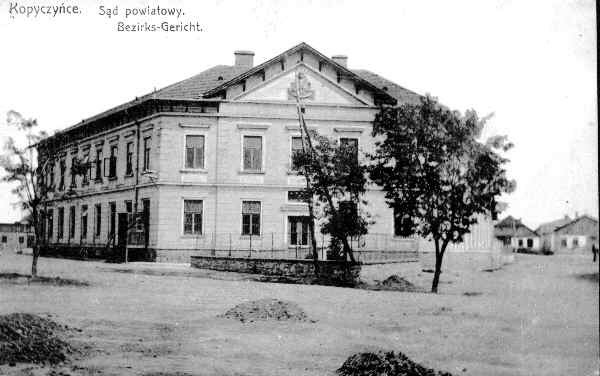
District Court in the 1910s

Following World War I Ukrainians began the process of creating their own state on historic Ukrainian lands. On November 1, 1918, Ukrainians took power in Lviv, the capital of Galicia, and proclaimed the West Ukrainian People’s Republic (ZUNR) on all Ukrainian lands of the former Austro-Hungarian Empire. The borders of the ZUNR were established according to the map “Ethnographic Map of the Austrian Monarchy” (1855) by Karl Czoernig.

On November 2, 1918, a secret Ukrainian military committee operating in Kopychyntsi under the leadership of Mykhailo Shakhnovych disarmed the gendarmerie and soldiers, took control of the district administration, and on behalf of the Ukrainian National Council proclaimed the authority of the ZUNR in the city. Soon afterward, a Temporary District Council was established. Stepan Safiian became the city mayor, and the military commandant was Lieutenant Vorokh of the Ukrainian Sich Riflemen. Many men who had served in the Austrian army volunteered to defend Ukraine’s state independence by joining the Ukrainian Galician Army; among them, Petro Yeliyiv became a company commander.

On November 13, 1918, the Ukrainian National Council adopted the “Provisional Fundamental Law on the State Independence of the Ukrainian Lands of the Former Austro-Hungarian Empire,” which defined the name of the state as the West Ukrainian People’s Republic. It included 12 districts in the Ternopil region, among them Kopychyntsi. The area was disputed between Poland and the West Ukrainian People's Republic (ZUNR) in what became known as the Polish-Ukrainian War. To defend the newly established state after the November Uprising and the outbreak of the Ukrainian–Polish War, the Galician Army was formed (from November 6 — the Ukrainian Galician Army). On November 15, 1918, the State Secretariat for Military Affairs of the ZUNR announced a general mobilization of the male population and established a military-territorial division of the state. The territory of the ZUNR was divided into three military districts — Lviv, Ternopil, and Stanislaviv — headed by military commanders. The total strength of the army steadily increased and reached 100,000 troops by the summer of 1919.

The Polish–Ukrainian War in Galicia of 1918–1919 began on November 1, 1918, with an armed uprising against the Ukrainian authorities in Lviv carried out by united Polish underground military organizations. During early November 1918, both sides built up their forces, fought for control of strategically important sites in Lviv and district towns, and established a front line. From November 5 to 18, fighting took place in Lviv between the Ukrainian Sich Riflemen Regiment and volunteer units on the one hand, and Polish forces on the other. Between November 18 and 22, Ukrainians were forced to withdraw from Lviv. During December 1918 and January 1919, the front stabilized; the northern and southern sectors of the front were formed, and two offensive operations of the Galician Army against Lviv were carried out. Subsequently, from February to April 1919, the struggle for the initiative continued, including the Vovchukhiv Operation of the Galician Army and the March counteroffensive of the Polish army. After that, the final stage of the war followed (May 14 – July 17, 1919), when, due to the difficult situation, the Ukrainian Galician Army retreated across the Zbruch River.

In March–April 1919, 40,000–60,000 Polish soldiers were engaged in combat on the Galician front. With the support of France and the United States, the Poles maintained more than one hundred light tanks, 60 combat aircraft, and 24 armored trains on the Galician front. The Galician Army had to defend independence in a struggle against the well-organized armed forces of Poland, and therefore, despite its defeat, its nine-month resistance stands as a great feat of the Ukrainian people.

On June 9, 1919, the Ukrainian Galician Army (UGA) launched its last desperate attempt to seize the initiative — a large-scale offensive operation from Chortkiv toward Lviv, known as the Chortkiv Offensive, during which the 5th Sokal Brigade of the First Corps of the UGA entered Kopychyntsi.

In June 1919, during the Chortkiv offensive, the 1st Galician Corps of the ZUNR under Osyp Mykytka seized the town. In July 1919, the headquarters of the Second Corps of the UGA was stationed in Kopychyntsi, with Myron Tarnavskyi serving as its commandant. The dictator of the ZUNR, jurist Yevhen Petrushevych, and Dr. Makukh arrived in Kopychyntsi. In Kopychyntsi, Myron Tarnavskyi was appointed Commander-in-Chief of the UGA, which subsequently advanced as far as Brody, Zolochiv, Berezhany, and Rohatyn, but was forced to retreat due to Poland’s military superiority. On July 17–18, 1919, the leadership of the ZUNR and all combat-ready units of the UGA crossed into Eastern Ukraine, where, together with the Army of the Ukrainian People’s Republic, they continued the struggle for Ukrainian statehood.

Kopychyntsi was occupied by Polish forces under Józef Haller the following month. Following the Treaty of Riga the town was officially restored to Poland. It was made a seat of a separate powiat within Tarnopol Voivodeship and a garrison town of a Border Protection Corps battalion Kopyczyńce.

Following the September Campaign of 1939 and the outbreak of World War II, the town was occupied first by the Soviet Union until 1941 and then Nazi Germany until 1944. According to the Soviet Extraordinary Commission, approximately 8,000 Jews were killed in Kopychyntsi during the war. After the war, it was annexed by the USSR, and since 1991 is part of independent Ukraine.

Until 18 July 2020, Kopychyntsi belonged to Husiatyn Raion. The raion was abolished in July 2020 as part of the administrative reform of Ukraine, which reduced the number of raions of Ternopil Oblast to three. The area of Husiatyn Raion was merged into Chortkiv Raion.

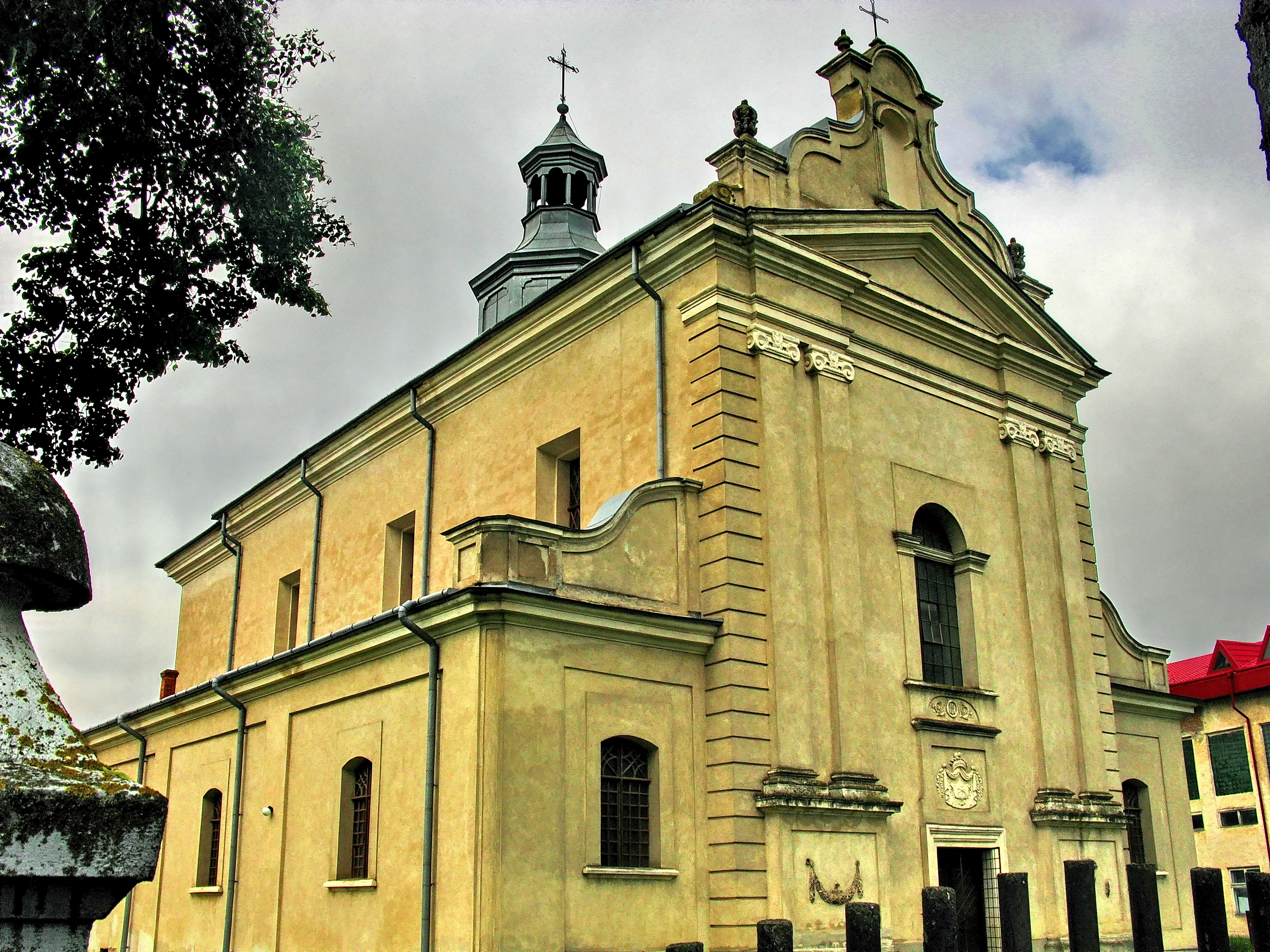
Assumption Church

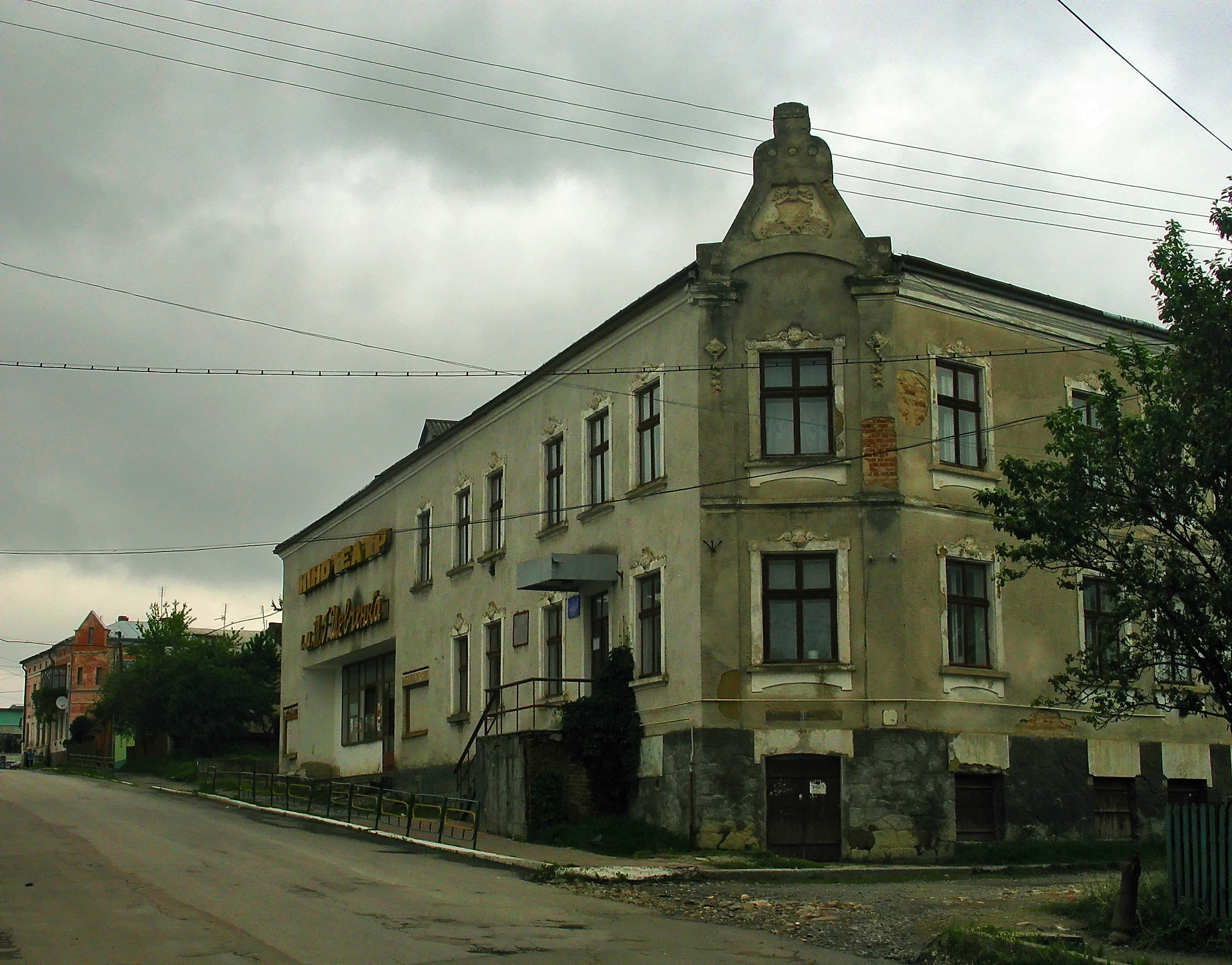
Street scene

== Religion ==
=== Houses of worship ===
- Ukrainian Greek Catholic Church of the Exaltation of the Holy Cross and bell tower (1630), located at Kutets
- Church of St. Nicholas on the Mount (1900), architect Vasyl Nahirny
- Roman Catholic Church of the Assumption of Mary (1802) in the center of the town
- Synagogue

== Attractions ==
- People's House, Kopychyntsi.
- Church of Exaltation of the Holy Cross. The temple was built in 1630, the founder was Martyn Ludetskyi, who at that time owned part of the Kopychyntsi lands.
- Park near the pool, founded in the 18th century;
- Castle (lost).

== Partner Towns ==
- Turkey, Amasra
- Belgium, Bruges
- Sweden, Höör
- Italy, Cavarzere
- Poland, Kisielice
- Ukraine, Opishnia
- United Kingdom, Liskeard
- Norway, Gjesdal
- Ukraine, Okhtyrka
- Germany, Rosdorf in Lower Saxony
- United States, Bozeman (Montana)

== Notable people ==
- Vasyl Ivanchuk, Ukrainian chess grandmaster
- Israel Jacob Kligler, Israeli microbiologist
- Mefodiy (Kudriakov)
- Adam Obrubański, Polish football player and manager
- Roman Hubczenko, Polish actor
- Franciszek Slawski, Polish linguist
- Pinhas Lavon, Israeli politician best known for the Lavon Affair
- Mike Mazurki, Ukrainian-American actor

== People associated with Kopychyntsi ==
- Adam Mikołaj Sieniawski
