= Battle of Berezhany =

- Part of Polish–Ukrainian War
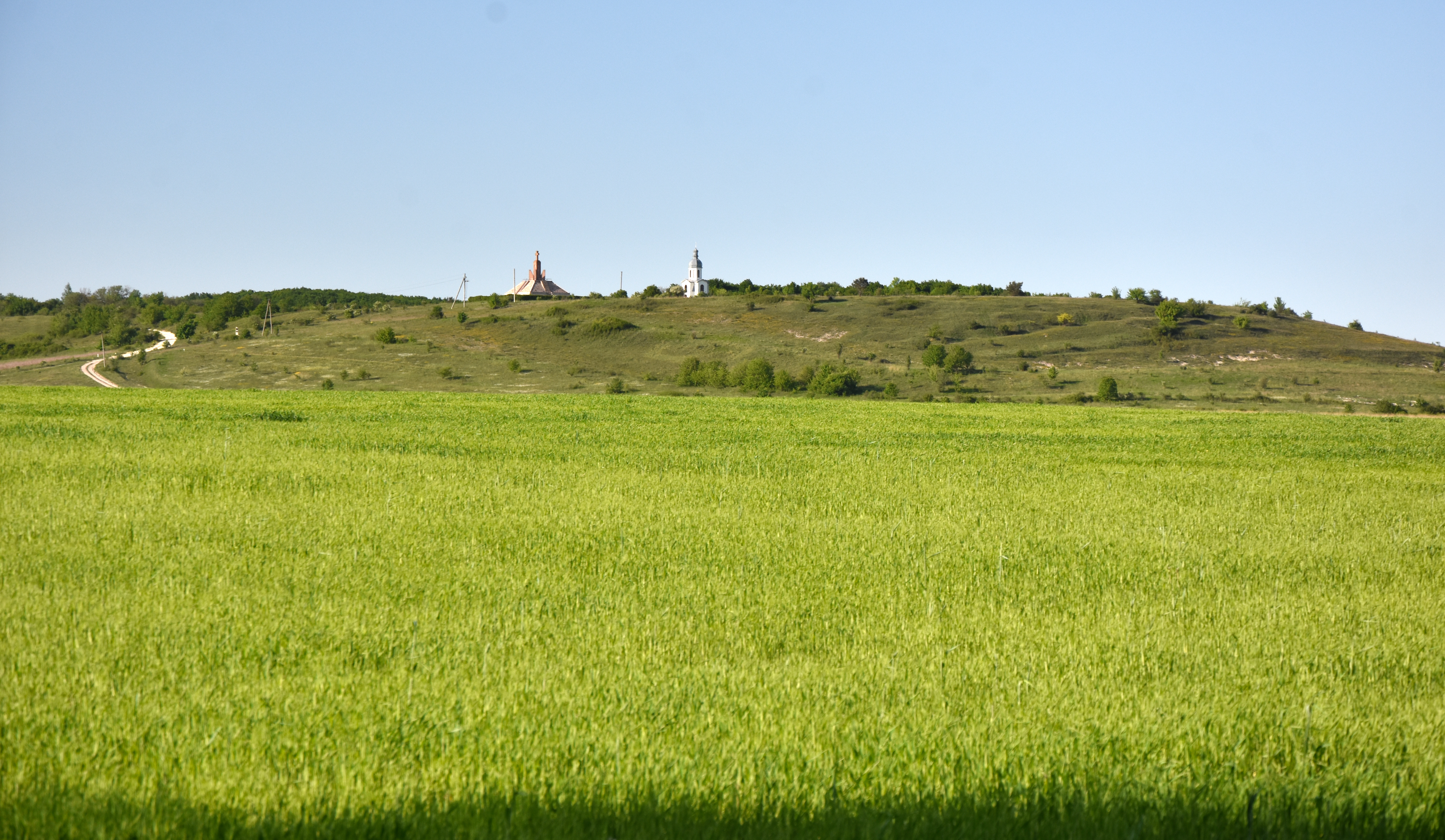
- Mountain Lysonia near Berezhany. A heavy fighting on the mountain took place during the battle
Date	16–21 June 1919
Location	Berezhany, Eastern Galicia
Result	Ukrainian victory (See Aftermath)
Territorial changes	UGA seizes Berezhany; Ukrainian offensive towards Lviv halted

Belligerents
West Ukrainian People's Republic	Second Polish Republic: French officers

Commanders and leaders
Oleksander Hrekov; Osyp Mykytka; Arnold Wolf	Władysław Jędrzejewski; Zygmunt Zieliński

Units involved
I Corps; II Corps; III Corps	3rd Legions Infantry Division

Strength
20,000 men	4,000 men

Casualties and losses
Heavy (Note: While the overall Ukrainian battle casualties are unknown, they're largely considered to be heavy. Particularly, Ukrainian 7th brigade lost 467 people during the battle)	Heavy: 76 French officers killed

The Battle of Berezhany was a five-day battle over the city of Berezhany in Eastern Galicia, which was the key point of Polish defence. The battle took place between the Ukrainian Galician Army from one side and several Polish regiments from the other. This battle was a turning point of the entire Polish-Ukrainian war, as it weakened UGA to the point that it could not continue its offensive.

== Background ==
On 7 June, Ukrainian Galician Army launched an offensive, and as of 15 June, it recaptured Chortkiv, Buchach, Terebovlya, Tarnopol and Pidhaytsi. After the series of defeats, Polish commandership decided to stop the Ukrainian offensive near the city of Berezhany. Oleksandr Hrekov's plan was to encircle and destroy the Polish garrison in the city, which would allow him to continue the offensive towards Lwów.

=== Strength of parties ===
All corps of the UGA were involved in the battle, and the total number of Ukrainian soldiers involved in a battle was approximately 20 thousand soldiers. Meanwhile, the town was controlled by 3rd Legions Infantry Division, and the total number of soldiers on the Polish side was approximately four thousand.

== Battle ==
On 16 June, the UGA began a series of an unsuccessful attacks on Berezhany and on the Polish defensive positions. Ukrainians also launched an attacks on mountain Łysonia, which changed hands several times. At the same time, Ukrainian artillery shelled Polish positions, however despite the attacks, Polish forces counterattacked and recaptured the area they previously lost. Later unsuccessful attacks on the city by the II Corps occurred on 17 and 18 June and were repelled, although Ukrainians managed to defeat the Poles near Zboriv. On 18 June, a small reinforcement was sent from Lwów. On 19 June, UGA launched an offensive with goal of capturing Berezhany. Ukrainians captured Łysonia and shelled the city with machine guns from it. Attacks that occurred a day later, on 20 June, were unsuccessful. However, after days of fighting, a breach was created in a Polish frontline north of the city, which forced the Polish army to eventually withdraw from the city. On 21 June, Zygmunt Zieliński ordered to withdraw from the city and on the same day it was captured by the Ukrainian Galician Army, thus ending the 5-day battle for the city.

== Aftermath ==
The battle was a turning point of the Polish–Ukrainian War. The Ukrainians achieved a pyrrhic victory in the battle and captured the city. However, Poles managed to evactuate most of the ammunition that was needed by the Ukrainians and to stop a Ukrainian offensive towards Lviv, which was of the reasons of an eventual defeat of the Ukrainian Galician Army in the war. A total of 76 French mercenaries were killed during the battle.

== Bibliography ==
- Diary of the Supreme Command of the Ukrainian Galician Army (PDF). New York: "Chervona Kalyna" Ukrainian Publications Cooperative. 1974.
- Didyk, Oleksandr (2020). ЧОРТКІВСЬКА ОФЕНЗИВА: Найуспішніша операція Галицької армії (in Ukrainian). Видавництво Астролябія / Astrolabe Publishing. ISBN 978-617-664-188-9.
