= Kalynivka, Vinnytsia Oblast =

City in Vinnytsia Oblast, Ukraine

Kalynivka Калинівка
- City
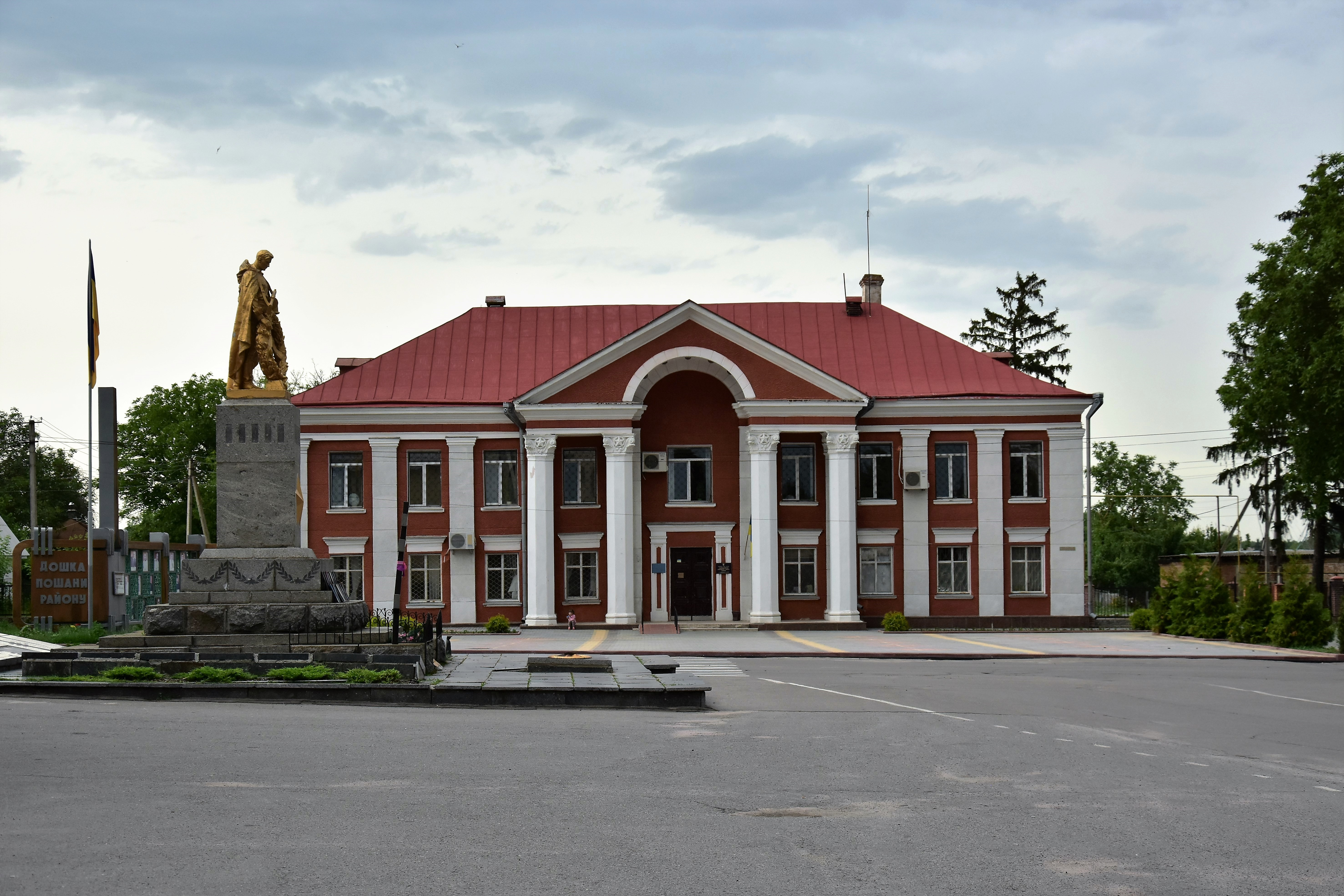
- Central Square

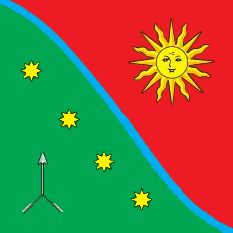
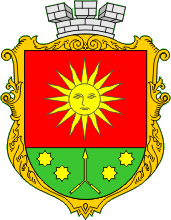
- Flag Coat of arms
- Interactive map of Kalynivka
- Location within Vinnytsia Oblast Location within Ukraine
- Coordinates: 49°26′50″N 28°31′23″E
- Country: Ukraine
- Oblast: Vinnytsia Oblast
- Raion: Khmilnyk Raion
- Hromada: Kalynivka urban hromada

Area
  - Total: 9.8 km^{2} (3.8 sq mi)
- Elevation: 288 m (945 ft)

Population (2022)
  - Total: 18,492
  - Density: 1,900/km^{2} (4,900/sq mi)
- Time zone: UTC+2 (EET)
  - Summer (DST): UTC+3 (EEST)
- Postal code: 22400 to 22406
- Area code: +380 4333
- KOATUU: 0521610100

Kalynivka (Ukrainian: Калинівка, IPA: [kɐˈlɪn⁽ʲ⁾iu̯kɐ]; Polish: Kalinówka; Russian: Калиновка) is a city in Vinnytsia Oblast, Ukraine. Part of the historical region of Podolia, Kalynivka serves as an important railway junction. It has a population of 18,492 (2022 estimate).

== History ==
The settlement was established in the first half of the 18th century. In 1774, there were 44 households, in which lived 143 people. There was a beer brewery, a wine distillery, and a grain mill. In 100 years, there were 145 households with a population of 1,138.

In the first half of the 19th century, near Kalynivka, a peasant uprising took place, led by Ustym Karmelyuk, and in 1828, a native of Kalynivka, Drevytskyi, was brought to the court for hiding the leader of the insurgency. In 1870, a train station was built in Kalynivka as part of the Kyiv-Odesa railroad. Since 1880s, four fairs were taking place in the town. In 1885, a small one-class church-parish school was opened for children. In 1902, an additional two-class public school (uchilische) was built. During the Russian Revolution of 1905, there was major civil unrest in Kalynivka, which involved the Tsarist regime sending several squadrons of dragoons on at least two occasions. At night on 30 October 1906, the residents of Kalynivka burned down the manor's estate.

In the summer of 1919 Kalynivka was taken by Ukrainian troops during their advance on Kyiv.

The Jewish population was important in the town. The earliest known Jewish community was 18th century. The census of 1939 reported 979 Jews living in Kalynivka, or one fifth of the total population, and 2,214 Jews residing in what was then the Kalinovka region. Affecting the Jewish Community were 1918-20 pogroms and Holocaust.

During World War II, the Germans occupied the town on July 22, 1941, and kept the Jews prisoners in a ghetto. At the start of 1942, a resistance group formed in the ghetto, under the leadership of Efim Kamenetskii. They collected firearms and were even able to make contact with Soviet partisan units. In May 1942, hundreds of Jews were murdered in mass executions perpetrated by an Einsatzgruppe.

A small number of Jews escaped or went into hiding during the roundup, some with the assistance of Ukrainian acquaintances. The commandant’s office offered a reward of 100 rubles for each Jew captured, and several Jewish families were reported to the authorities. They were confined with Jewish craftsmen in several residences on the outskirts of Kalinovka, which were enclosed by barbed wire. A few escaped, while the remaining prisoners were killed in mid-August 1942.

The mass grave site commemorates approximately 1,300 Jewish residents of the town covers about 0.01 hectares and contains memorial stones dating from 1947. Located on the outskirts of Kalynivka between industrial and agricultural land.

Kalynivka was liberated by the Red Army in March 1944.

After the war Kalynivka developed into a regional industrial and administrative center, with machinery, food-processing, dairy, canning, and building-material enterprises. Under the Soviet rule the town served as a district centre, remaining the administrative capital of Kalynivka Raion until its disbandment in 2020.

At the end of the twentieth century, Kalynivka had several industrial enterprises, including the Kharchomash production association, repair-mechanical and wood-materials plants, food-processing facilities, and the Podolianka factory. Its population was 19,848 according to the 2001 Ukrainian census.

=== 2017 munitions explosion ===
On 26 September 2017, at about 10:00 pm (19:00 UTC), the munitions depot for the Ukrainian Army, just south of the town, blew up causing extensive damage to nearby houses and other buildings. This was implied (if not claimed) to be Russian "sabotage" by Ukrainian authorities, including President Petro Poroshenko and Prime Minister Volodymyr Groysman. In September 2021 the general prosecutor announced that evidence confirmed sabotage.

== Gallery ==
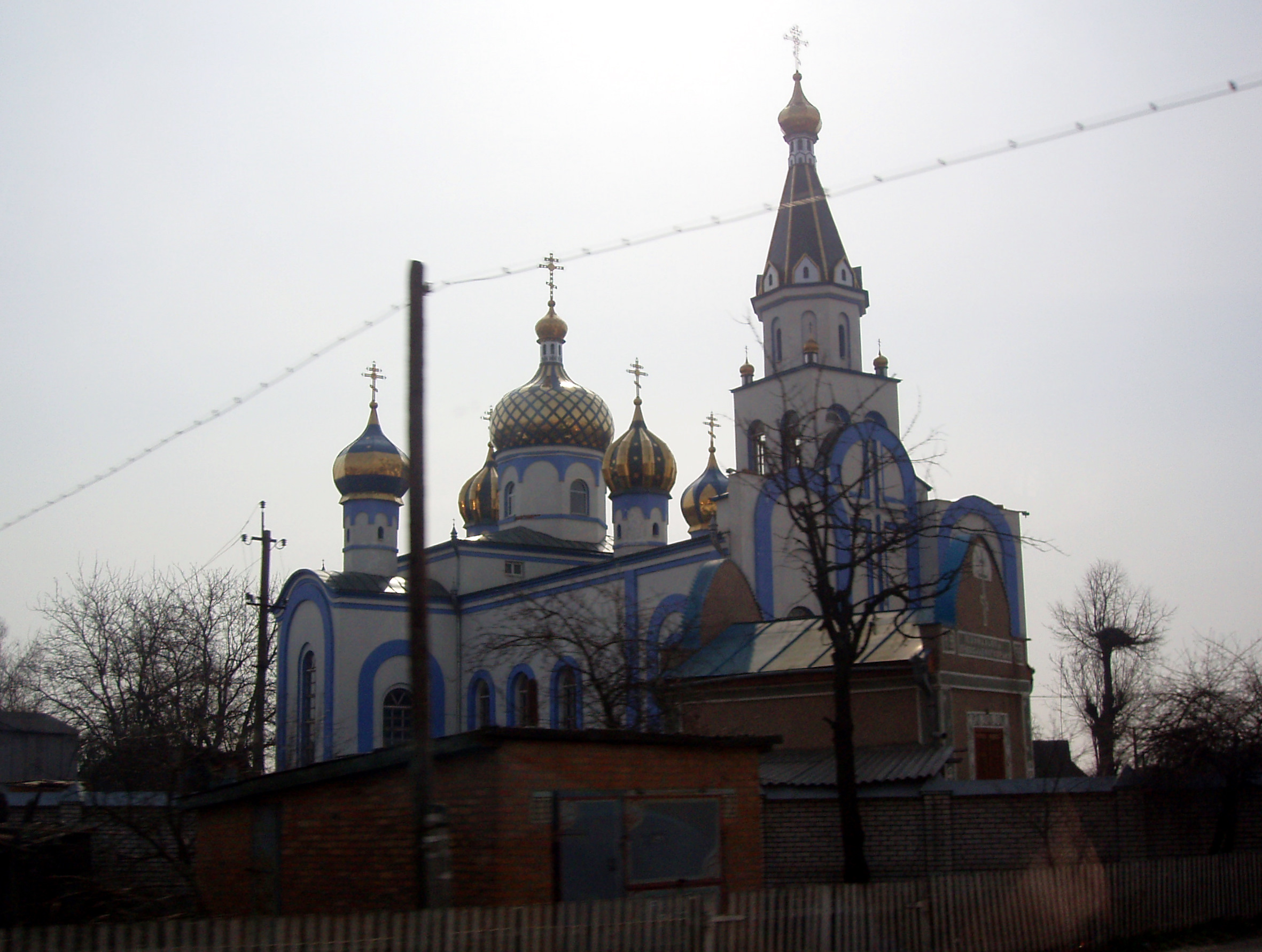
St. Paraskeva Church

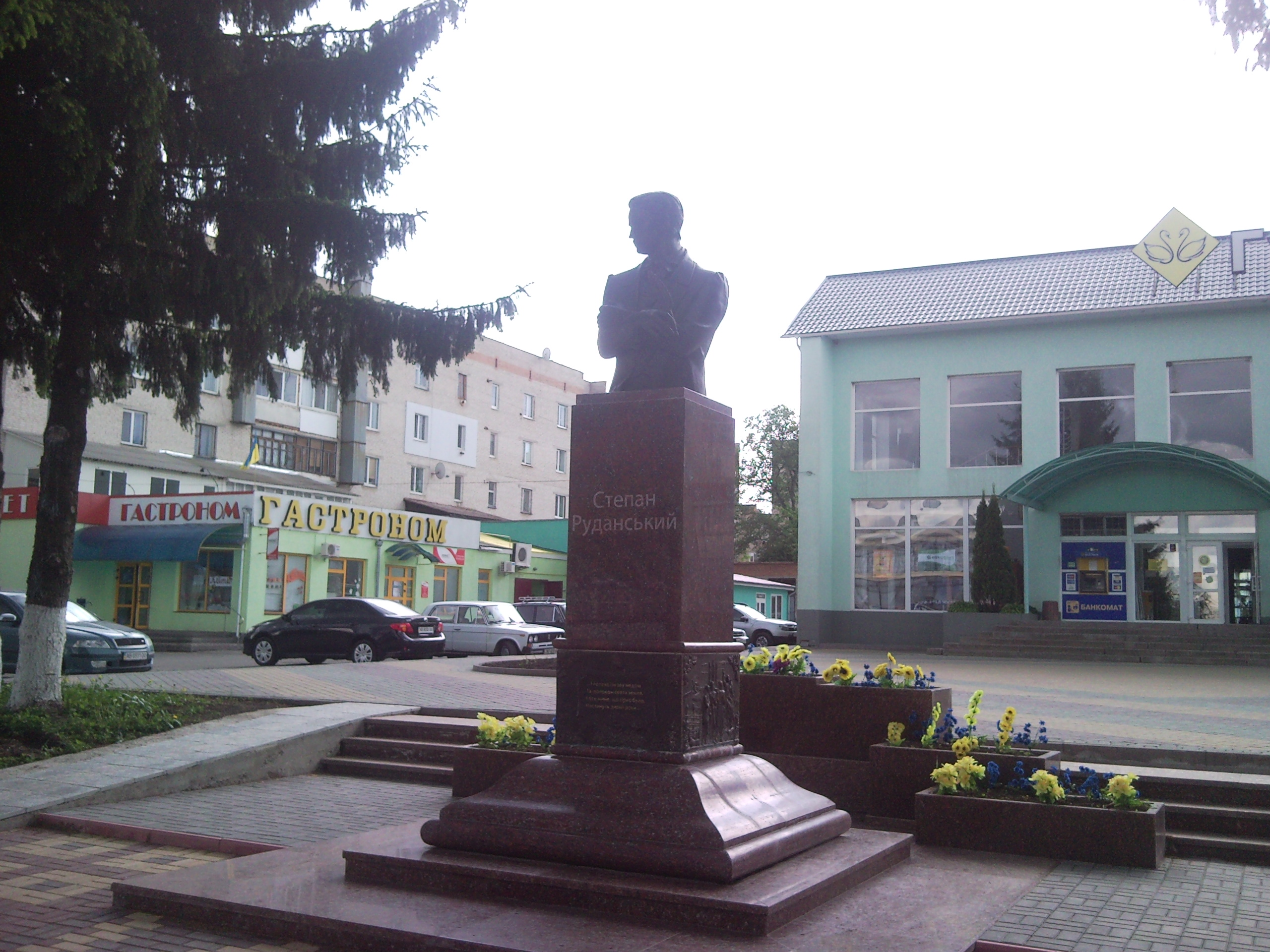
Stepan Rudanskyi monument in downtown Kalynivka

== Notable people ==
- Oleksandr Dombrovskyi (born 1962), Ukrainian politician, mayor of Vinnytsia (2002-2005)
- Vitaliy Buyalskyi (born 1993), Ukrainian footballer
