= Chortkiv offensive =

1919 battle of the Polish-Ukrainian War

- Part of the Polish–Ukrainian War (1918–1919)
- Map of the Ukrainian offensive in June 1919
Date	7–28 June 1919 (Chortkiv offensive); 28 June – 18 July 1919 (Polish Summer counteroffensive),
Location	Chortkiv, East Galicia, West Ukrainian People’s Republic
Result	Polish victory (See Aftermath)
Territorial changes	West Ukrainian People's Republic annexed to Poland

Belligerents
West Ukrainian People’s Republic	Second Polish Republic

Commanders and leaders
Yevhen Petrushevych; Oleksander Hrekov; Antin Kravs; Myron Tarnavsky; Osyp Mykytka	(Second Polish Republic) Józef Piłsudski (Second Polish Republic) Józef Haller

Strength
7 June: 19,000 soldiers and officers Up to 50 artillery batteries 28 June: 24,000 infantry 400 cavalry 376 machine guns 144 artillery pieces	28 June: 38,600 infantry 2,100 cavalry 797 machine guns 207 artillery pieces

The Chortkiv offensive (Ukrainian: Чортківська офензива, Чортків, Polish: Ofensywa czortkowska, Czortków), also known as June Offensive (Ukrainian: Червнева офензива), was a counteroffensive military operation of the Ukrainian Galician Army (UHA) against the Polish Army during the Polish-Ukrainian War of 1918–1919. Initially, the numerically inferior Ukrainian force achieved tactical success along the entire front, pushing back the French-supported Polish troops. However, the offensive failed to achieve strategic success due to lack of ammunition, and after a Polish counteroffensive the Galician Army was forced to retreat across the Zbruch river, leaving Galicia in Polish hands.

== Background ==
By early June 1919 the Polish army had expelled Ukrainian troops of the Galician Army into the southeastern corner of Galicia, limited by the rivers Zbruch and Dniester. The two armies were opposing each other across the front passing along the line Husiatyn-Ulashkivtsi-Tovste-Ustechko.

The Ukrainian goal of the offensive was to push the Polish Army back to the Zolota Lypa River to improve the morale of the local Ukrainians and the UHA, as well as to provide a defensible area, from which mobilization of a larger force in order to push the Poles back past Lviv (Lwów), Przemyśl, Chełm, Lublin and other territories claimed by the West Ukrainian People's Republic after 1 November 1918 would be possible.

== Ukrainian offensive ==
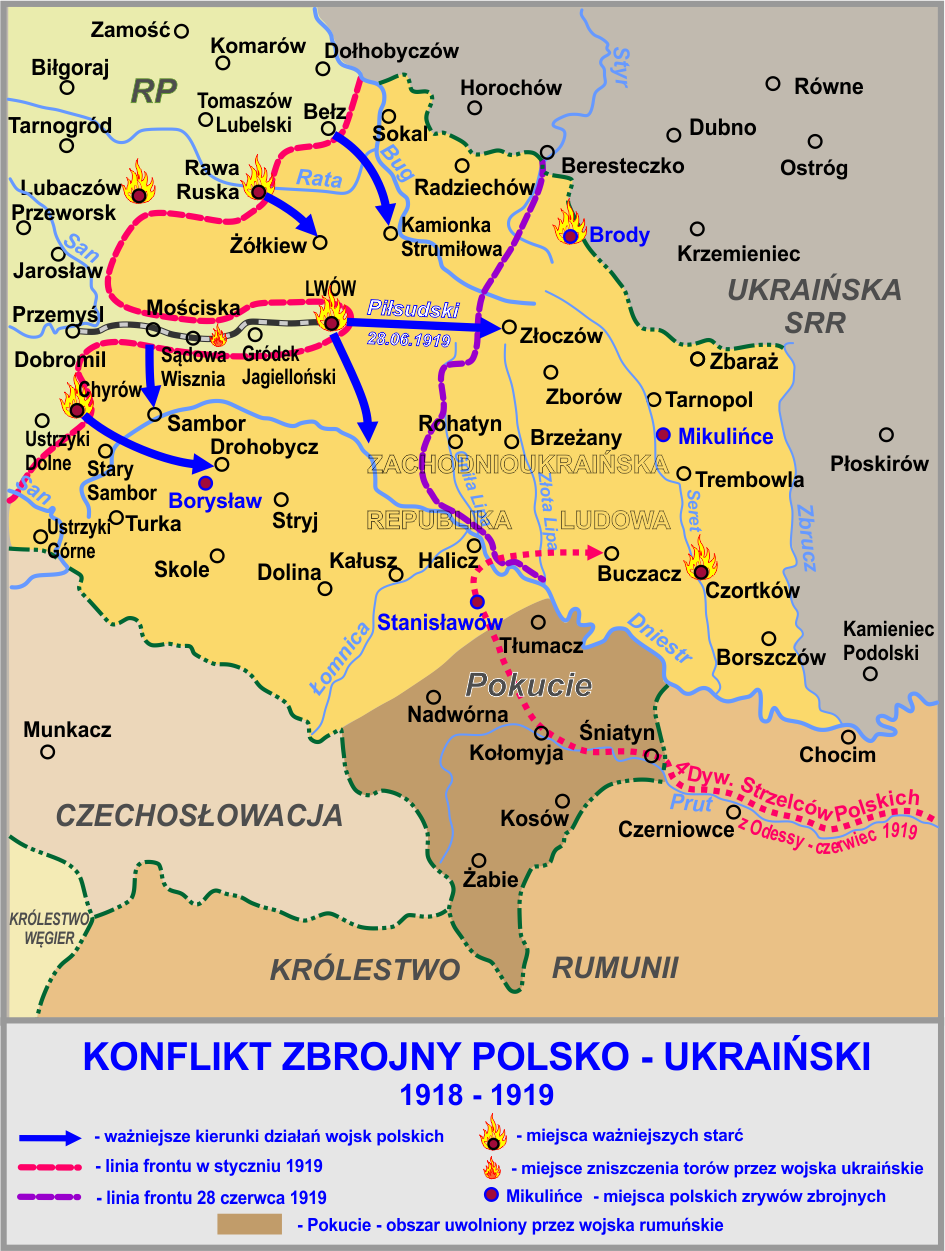
Line of maximum Ukrainian advance during the offensive (purple) compared to the initial frontline in January (pink)

The offensive started on 7 June 1919. On 8 June, the Ukrainian Galician Army, numbering around 19,000–20,000 men, assaulted Chortkiv, forcing the Poles to retreat. The Ukrainian forces also gained victories at Yahilnytsia (7–8 June), Vyhnanka (8 June), Bilobozhnytsia (9–10 June), Kopychyntsi (10 June), Yazlovets (11–12 June), Buchach (12 June), Terebovlya (12–13 June), Monastyryska (13 June), Ternopil (14 June), Kozova (14 June), Nyzhniv (14–15 June), Pidhaytsi (15–16 June), Berezhany (20–21 June). Polish troops had to retreat to the Holohory–Peremyshliany–Bukachivtsi line, almost 120 km behind their positions at the start of the offensive. Under the command of general Oleksandr Hrekov, the Ukrainian forces approached Lviv, the main urban center of Eastern Galicia, which had been proclaimed capital of the West Ukrainian People's Republic, although they were unable to capture it.

However, despite the initial Ukrainian success, Polish forces were able to mount an orderly retreat and prevent the Ukrainian forces from developing the offensive further, denying them ammunition stockpiles (which were badly needed by the Ukrainians) and slowing the momentum of the offensive considerably. On June 23rd, the Polish forces successfully attacked Holohory, pushing the Ukrainians back beyond the Zolota Lypa river. Simultaneously, on 18 June the Allied Council of Foreign Ministers allowed Polish troops to continue their military operations up to the Zbruch River.

== Polish counterattack ==
As the Ukrainian Galician Army suffered from a general lack of ammunition, on 28 June the better equipped and numerically superior Polish forces broke through the Ukrainian lines at Janczyn and forced them to retreat and evacuate across the Zbruch River. Due to the support of the French Third Republic in the war, the Polish Army was able to assemble a much larger and more powerful force of around 39,000–40,000 men against the Ukrainian Galician Army, and the Ukrainians were forced to return to their previous positions and abandon the cities and villages they had captured during their recent offensive. Eventually, the Ukrainian forces were forced to retreat into Dnieper Ukraine, which was then controlled by the Ukrainian People's Republic, another nascent Ukrainian state.

== Aftermath ==
The collapse of the Ukrainian lines at Janczyn forced the Ukrainian forces to retreat from Galicia, and, on July 16, 1919, the government and armed forces of the West Ukrainian People's Republic moved to the territory of Ukrainian People's Republic further east.

Despite the operational and strategic victory of Poland, the initial tactical victories of the numerically inferior Ukrainian forces against the comparatively better equipped Polish army had a profoundly positive effect on Ukrainian morale, both in Galicia and elsewhere, cementing the offensive as an example of Ukrainian military victories during the Ukrainian War of Independence. The experience gained during the offensive was used by the Galician Army during its later operations against the Red Army.
