= Church of the Exaltation of Holy Cross, Kopychyntsi =

Church in Ukraine

Coordinates: 49°5′50.8″N 25°54′42.4″E

Church of the Exaltation of the Holy Cross
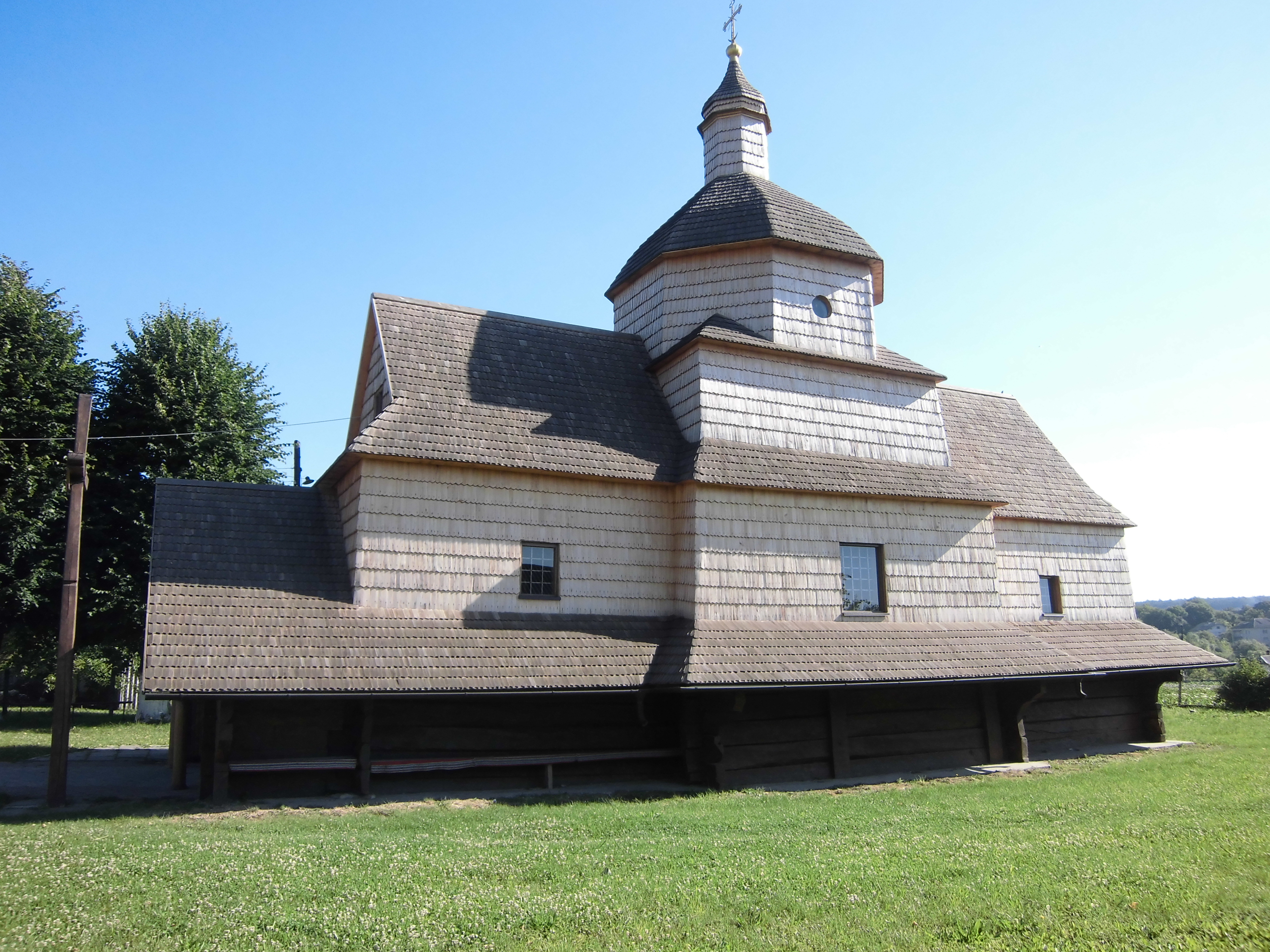
- Church of the Exaltation of the Holy Cross
- Denomination: Catholic Church
- Sui iuris church: Ukrainian Greek Catholic
- Churchmanship: Byzantine Rite

History
- Status: Parish

Architecture
- Style: Ukrainian baroque
- Groundbreaking: 1630

Administration
- Province: Ukrainian Catholic Archeparchy of Lviv

Clergy
- Archbishop: Ihor Vozniak

Immovable Monument of National Significance of Ukraine
- Official name: Церква та дзвіниця (дер.) (Church and bell tower (wooden))
- Type: Architecture
- Reference no.: 190083

Church of the Exaltation of the Holy Cross (Ukrainian: Церква Воздвиження Чесного Хреста Господнього) is one of the oldest wooden churches of Ternopil Oblast, Ukraine, built in 1630. Its bell tower was built in the first half of the 18th century. Located in the area Kutets of Kopychyntsi Husiatyn Raion. The style is Ukrainian Baroque. It is an architectural monument of national significance. The founder of the church was Martin Ludetskyi, owner of the locality Kutets, that was a part of the Cossack Hetmanate or "Hetmanshchyna".

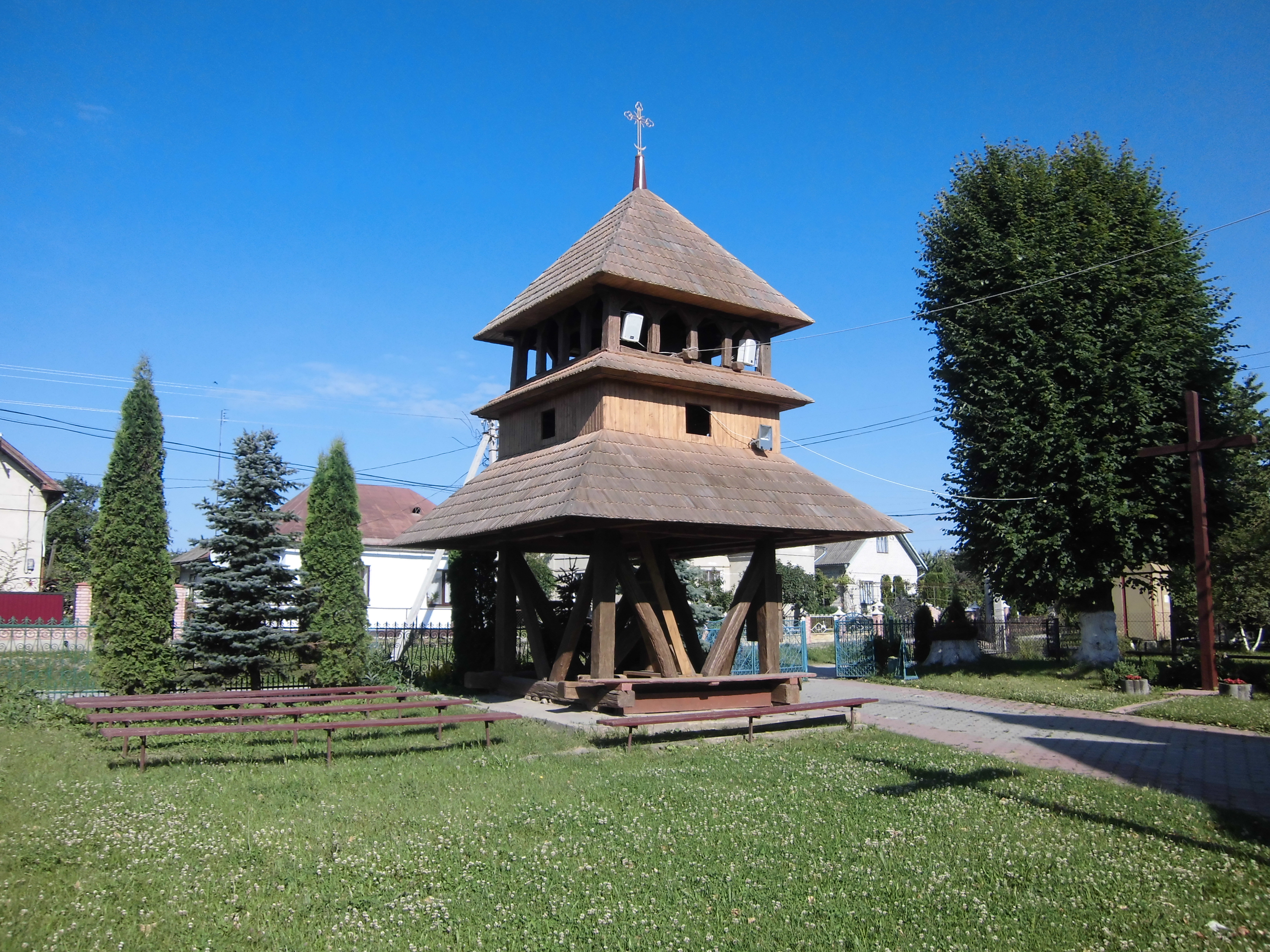
Bell tower

== Sources ==
- Карвовський Ст. Чотири тижні в Галичині // Духовні, історичні та природні перлини рідного краю: Буклет — путівник. — Склали та упоряд. Худзік О. Д., Сагайдак Л. Т. (Реценз. Гуменюк Я. С., Козачок Н. В.) — Відділ освіти Гусятинської РДА, 2012 — (Присвячено 120-річному ювілею патріарха УГКЦ Йосипа Сліпого).
