= Kalynivka Raion =

Former subdivision of Vinnytsia Oblast, Ukraine

Coordinates: 49°26′50″N 28°31′23″E

Kalynivka Raion Калинівський район
- Raion
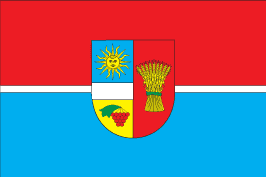
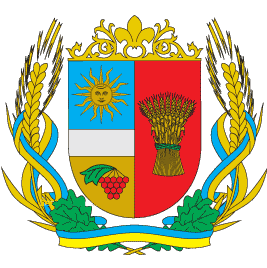
- Flag Coat of arms

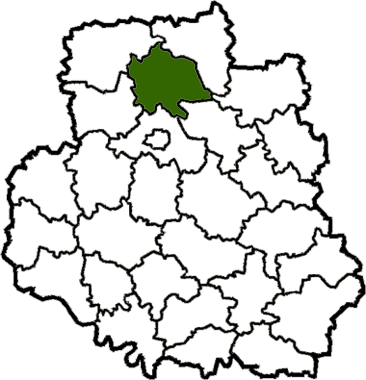
- Country: Ukraine
- Oblast: Vinnytsia Oblast
- Established: 1923
- Disestablished: 18 July 2020
- Admin. center: Kalynivka
- Subdivisions: List: 1 — city councils; 0 — settlement councils; 28 — rural councils; Number of localities: 1 — cities; 0 — urban-type settlements; 51 — villages; — rural settlements

Government
  - Governor: Vasyl Polyshchuk

Area
  - Total: 1,090 km^{2} (420 sq mi)

Population (2020)
  - Total: 56,268 ▼
  - Density: 51.6/km^{2} (134/sq mi)
- Time zone: UTC+02:00 (EET)
  - Summer (DST): UTC+03:00 (EEST)
- Postal index: 22400—22461
- Area code: +380 4333
- Website: http://kalynivka-rda.gov.ua

Kalynivka Raion (Ukrainian: Калинівський район) was one of raions of Vinnytsia Oblast, located in southwestern Ukraine. The administrative center of the raion was the town of Kalynivka. The raion was abolished and its territory was merged into Khmilnyk Raion on 18 July 2020 as part of the administrative reform of Ukraine, which reduced the number of raions of Vinnytsia Oblast to six. The last estimate of the raion population was 56,268 (2020 est.).
