= Holohory, Zolochiv Raion, Lviv Oblast =

Rural locality in Lviv Oblast, Ukraine

Coordinates: 49.754°N 24.723°E

Holohory Гологори Russian: Гологоры, Gologory Polish: Gołogóry Yiddish: גאָליגע, Goligor
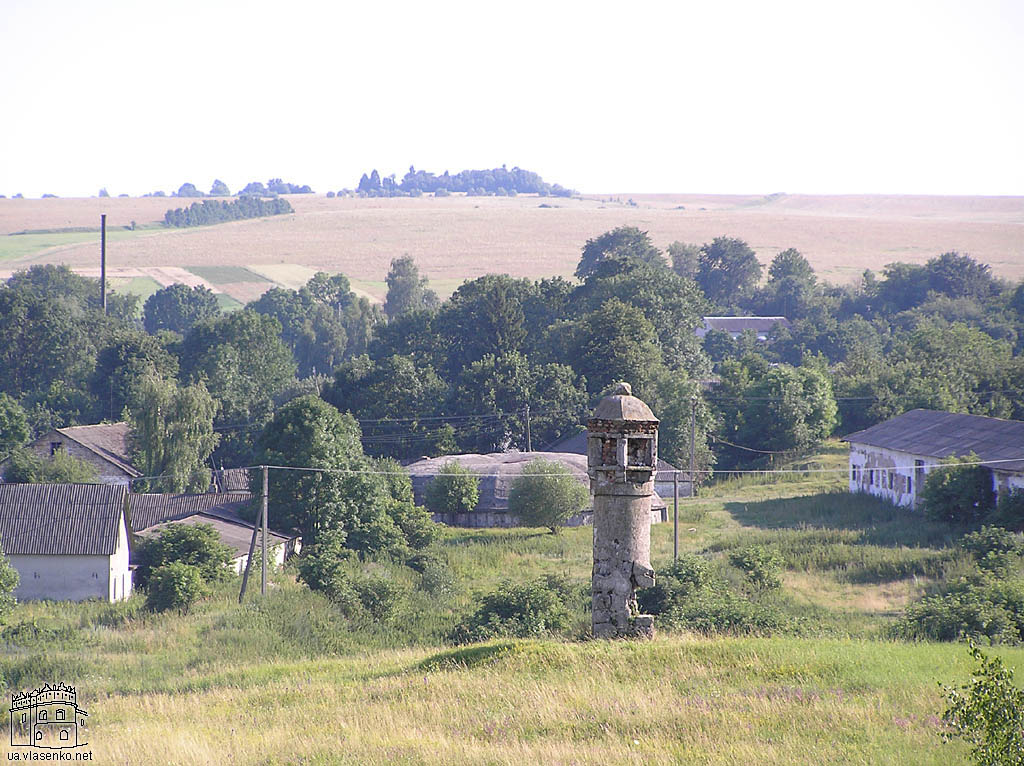
- Гологори на Золочівщині Львівської області - липень 2007 року
- Interactive map of Holohory
- Established: 1099

Population
  - Total: 658

Holohory (Ukrainian: Гологори, Russian: Гологоры, Gologory, Polish: Gołogóry, Yiddish: גאָליגע, Goligor) is a village in Zolochiv Raion, Lviv Oblast, Ukraine. (Note: English spelling varies from source to source, and over time. According to jewishgen.org, common usage was Gołogóry while the place belonged to Poland, then Gologory while in the Soviet Union, with Holohory being the current accepted spelling in modern Ukraine.) It belongs to Zolochiv urban hromada, one of the hromadas of Ukraine. The population is approximately 658 people. Holohory has a rural council as local self-government. The name literally means "bare hills".

== Geography ==
Holohory is located within the wooded Holohory hill range on the bank of the Zolota Lypa River where its right tributary, Hnyla Lypa, flows in.

== History ==
The earliest settlement in Holohory date back to 1099 and are first mentioned in the Laurentian Codex in 1144 and in 1232 – in the Galician–Volhynian Chronicle. At first, Holohory belonged to the Zvenigorod principality, and from 1140 – to Galician principality.

Mongol invasion of Rus' took place here for centuries, resulting in destroyed structures built out of wood and after these raids only some fortifications were left standing.

The Holohory castle was first built of broken stone (the exact date of construction is unknown), after the damage done by the Golden Horde it was rebuilt in 1441. The castle had hidden tunnels that led to exits in the forest. These tunnels were fairly spacious and have survived until recent times. A famous battle of Bohdan Khmelnytsky took place here in 1792. During the Soviet Union in 1950s, its remaining stones were used for the construction of a road for a collective farm (kolkhoz).

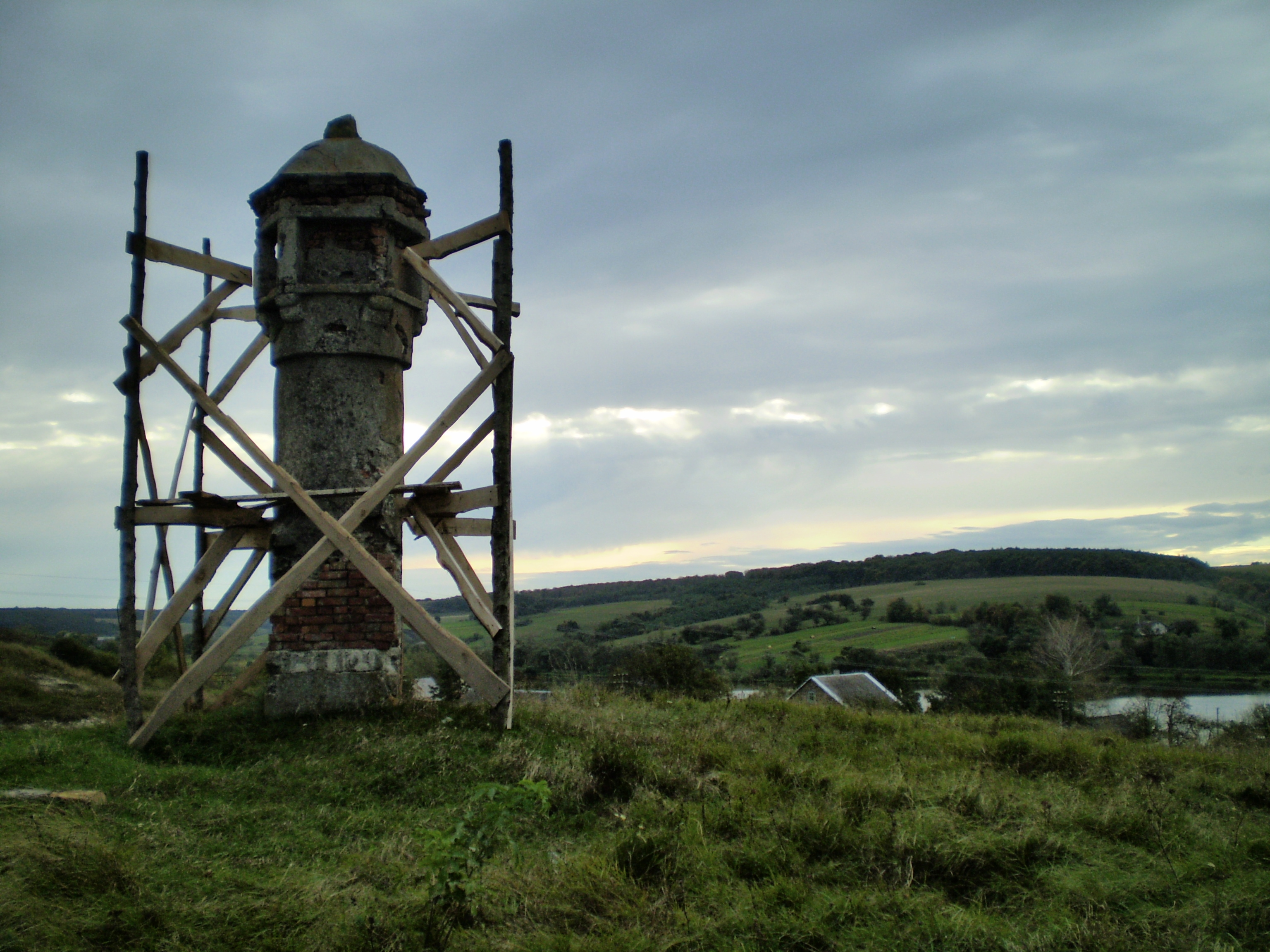
Saint Mark Statue in Holohory

Holohory revived and became a major trade center from the 15th century and attained the Magdeburg rights (in 1365 and in 1469). In the 17th-century due to increased trade, the Jewish population has increased. In every community, there was a position of Rabbi whose duties consisted of maintaining the list of vital records and supervision of education. Thus in 1895 Maurice de Hirsch established a private Jewish primary school, which in 1901 became a technical school open to children of all creeds. Its students made tin cans for sale in exchange for their education.

After the World War II the village was damaged and a lot of the human potential lost. Between 1939 and 1940 a lot of the local intelligentsia including the Poles (Masurians) who were settlers from Poland were deported to Gulag in Siberia. During the German occupation Reichskommissariat Ukraine 300 youths were taken as Ostarbeiter and 700 Jews were killed in a Ghetto on the outskirts of Lyatske village. Between 1945 and 1950, Ukrainian patriots, particularly those who did not want to join the kolkhoz were packed into freight wagons and from the railroad in Krasoe village were sent to the Far East: Irkutsk, Karaganda. Others left the village to escape the NKVD prisoner massacres or joined the UPA Ukrainian Insurgent Army.

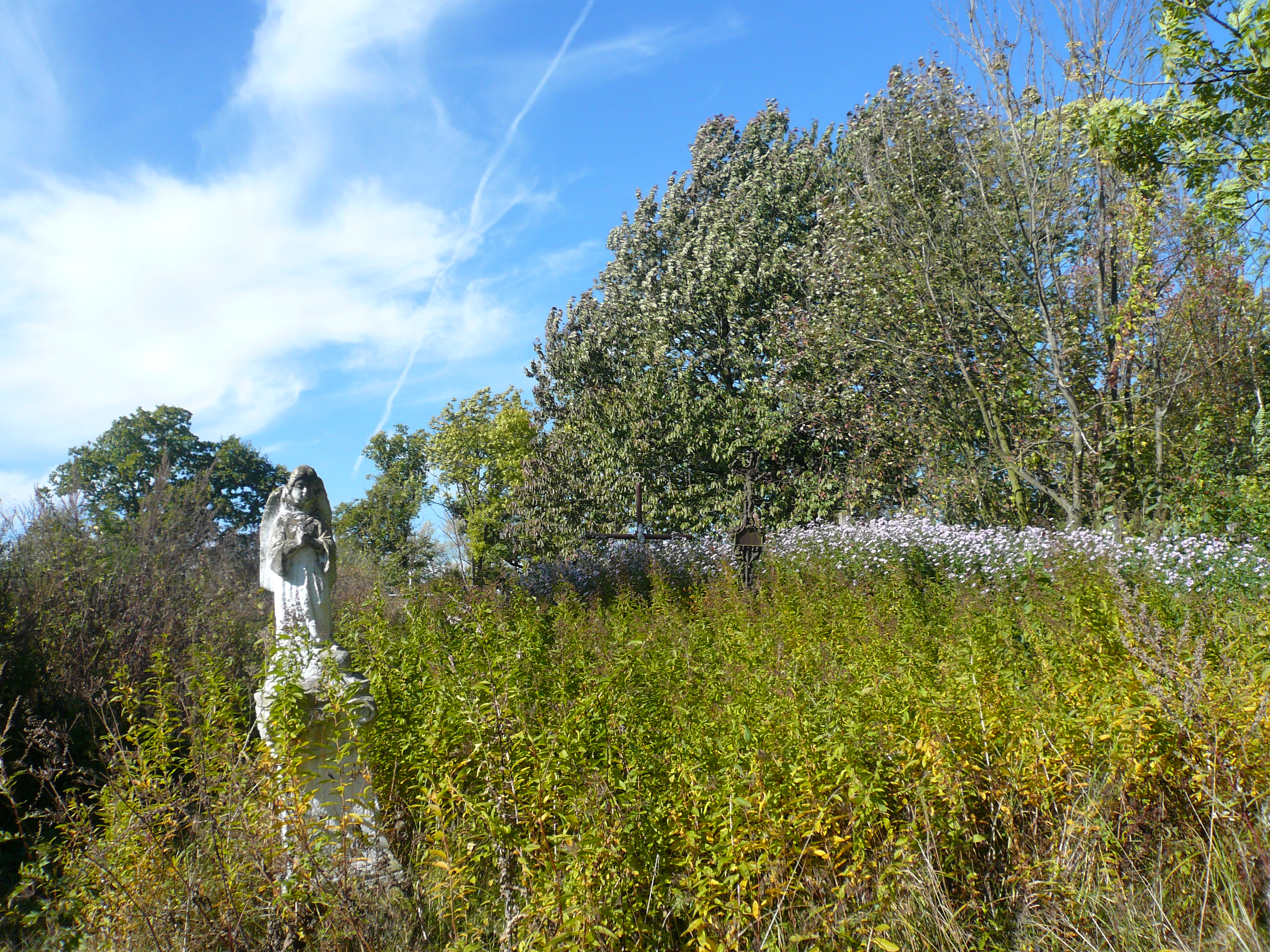
Gologory cemetery

In 1968, the population decreased to 2,339 people and in 1983, to 737 people. After the Declaration of Independence of Ukraine, a ceremony of interment of the remains of Ukrainian soldiers of The Galician Division (14th Waffen Grenadier Division of the SS (1st Galician)), found in a vacant lot and buried with military honors at the entrance to the cemetery. They built a monument to the victims of mass killings under communist regimes (1939–1953) in its place. The Holy Trinity Church (built in 1630) was reopened in 1991 and is active today.

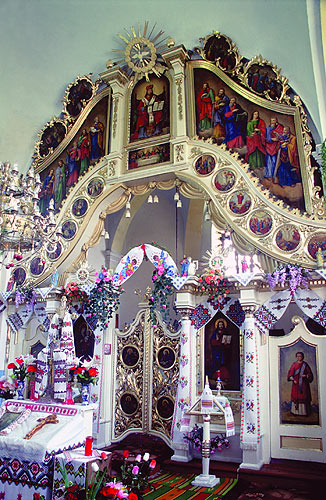
Ikonostasis of the Holy Trinity Church in Holohory

In 2009 the daughter of Pavlo Pytel, a Ukrainian Sich Riflemen, whose home in the early XX Century served as a library Prosvita as well as hosted Father Vasyliy Voronovsky, while he was a teacher during a five-year period - Stefaniya Pytel, researched, wrote and published a book about Holohory (village).

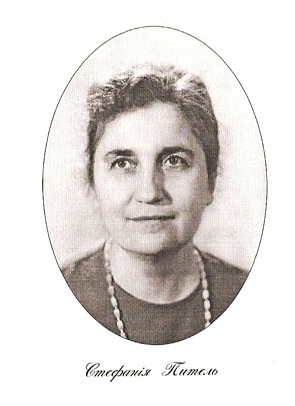
Stefa Pytel - author of the book about Holohory

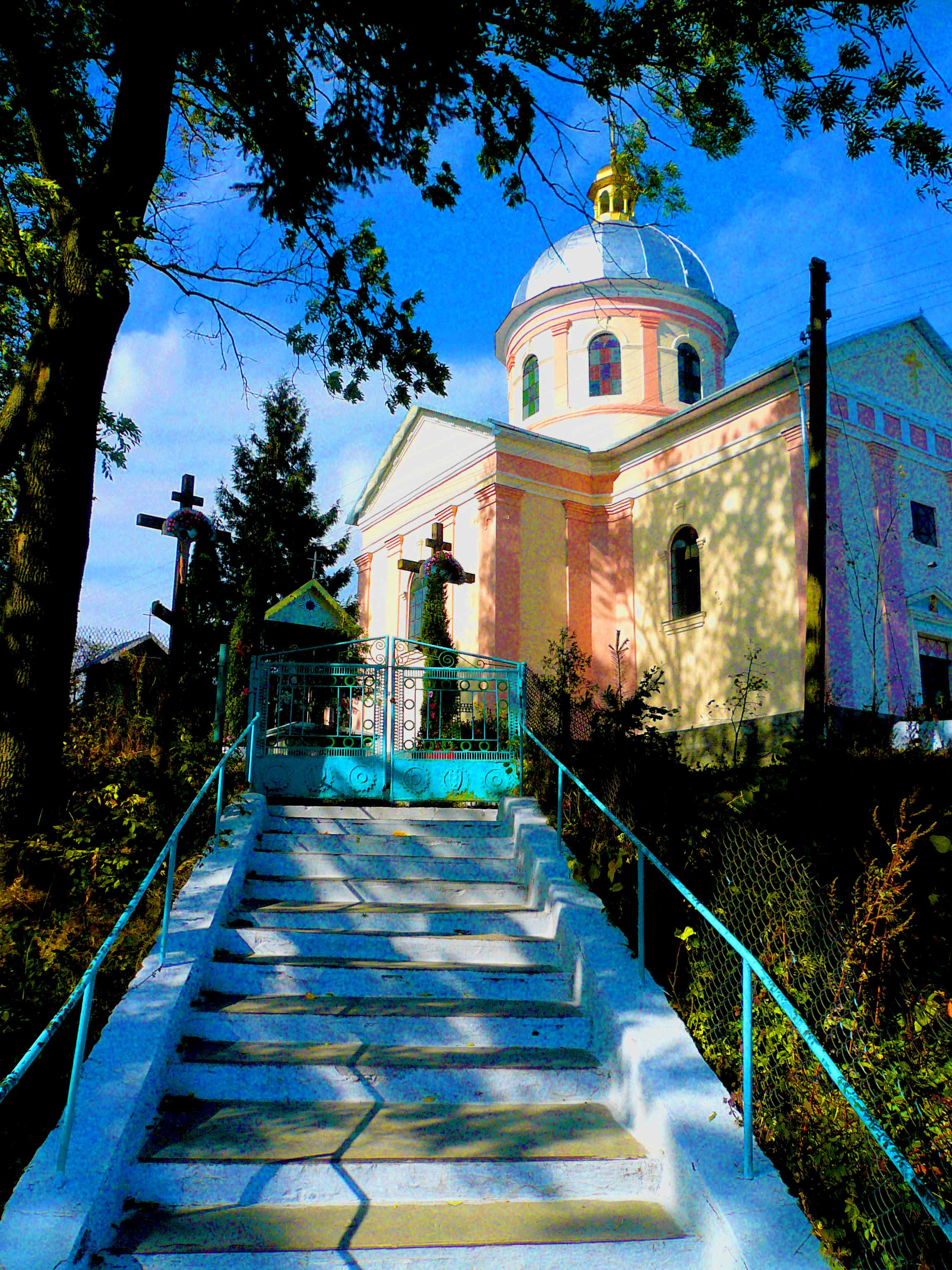
St. George church in Holohory

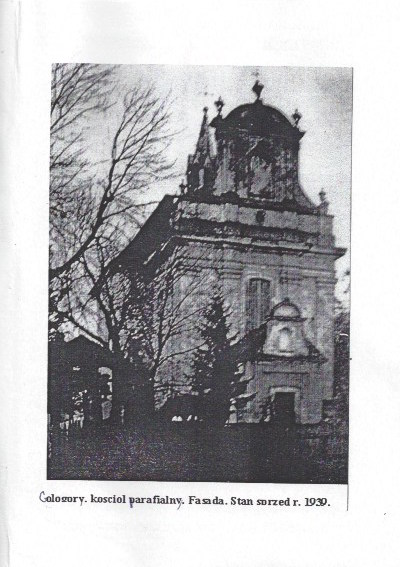
Kosciol in Gologory before 1939
