= May offensive (1919) =

1919 Polish-Ukrainian War military campaign

May Offensive
- Part of Polish–Ukrainian War
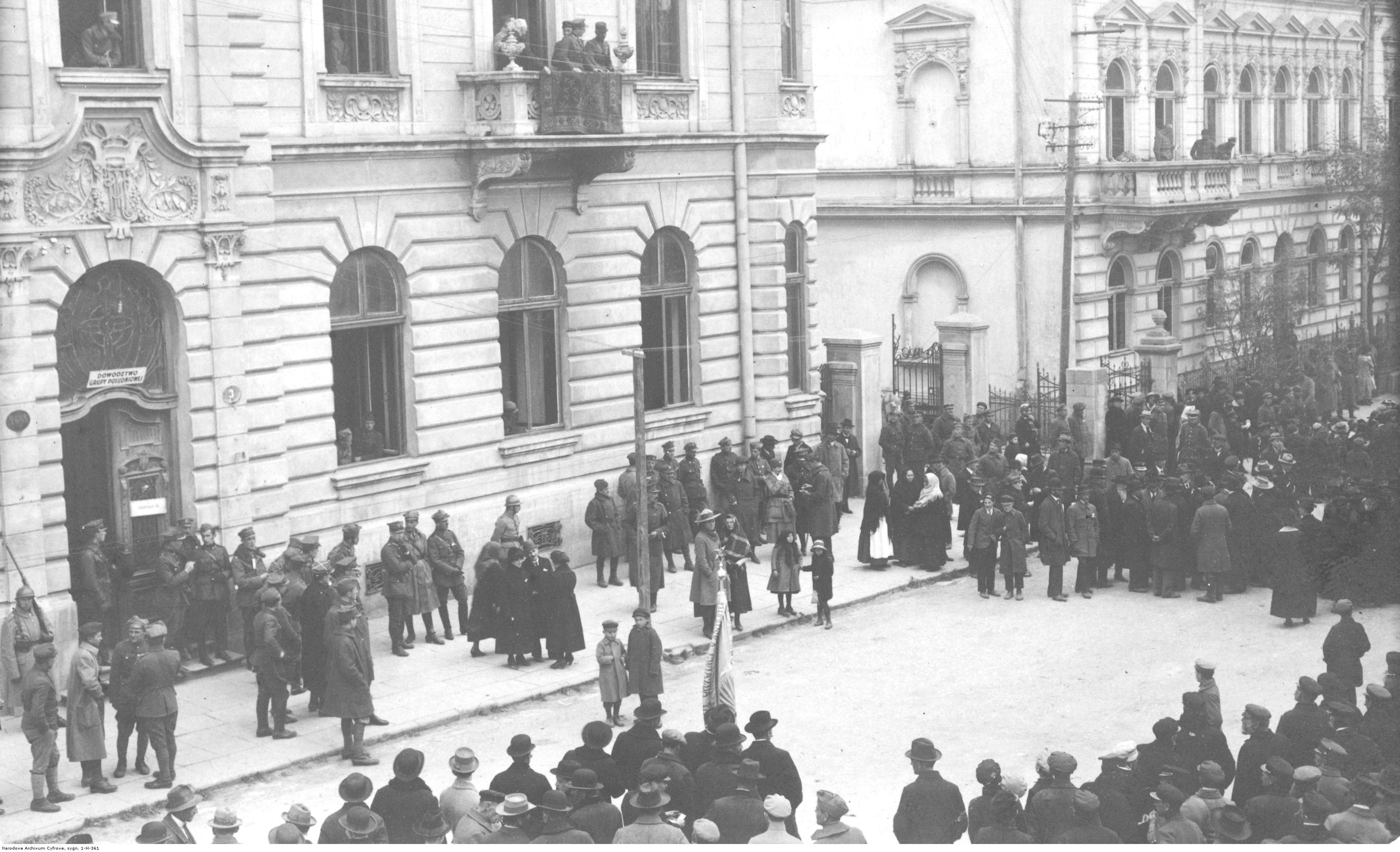
- Polish forces in Tarnopol, June 1919
Date	14 May – 1st June 1919
Location	Eastern Galicia and Volhynia
Result	Polish victory
Territorial changes	Most of Galicia captured by the Polish army

Belligerents
Second Polish Republic	West Ukrainian People's Republic

Commanders and leaders
Józef Haller	Mykhailo Omelianovych-Pavlenko

Strength
50,000 soldiers	44,000 troops

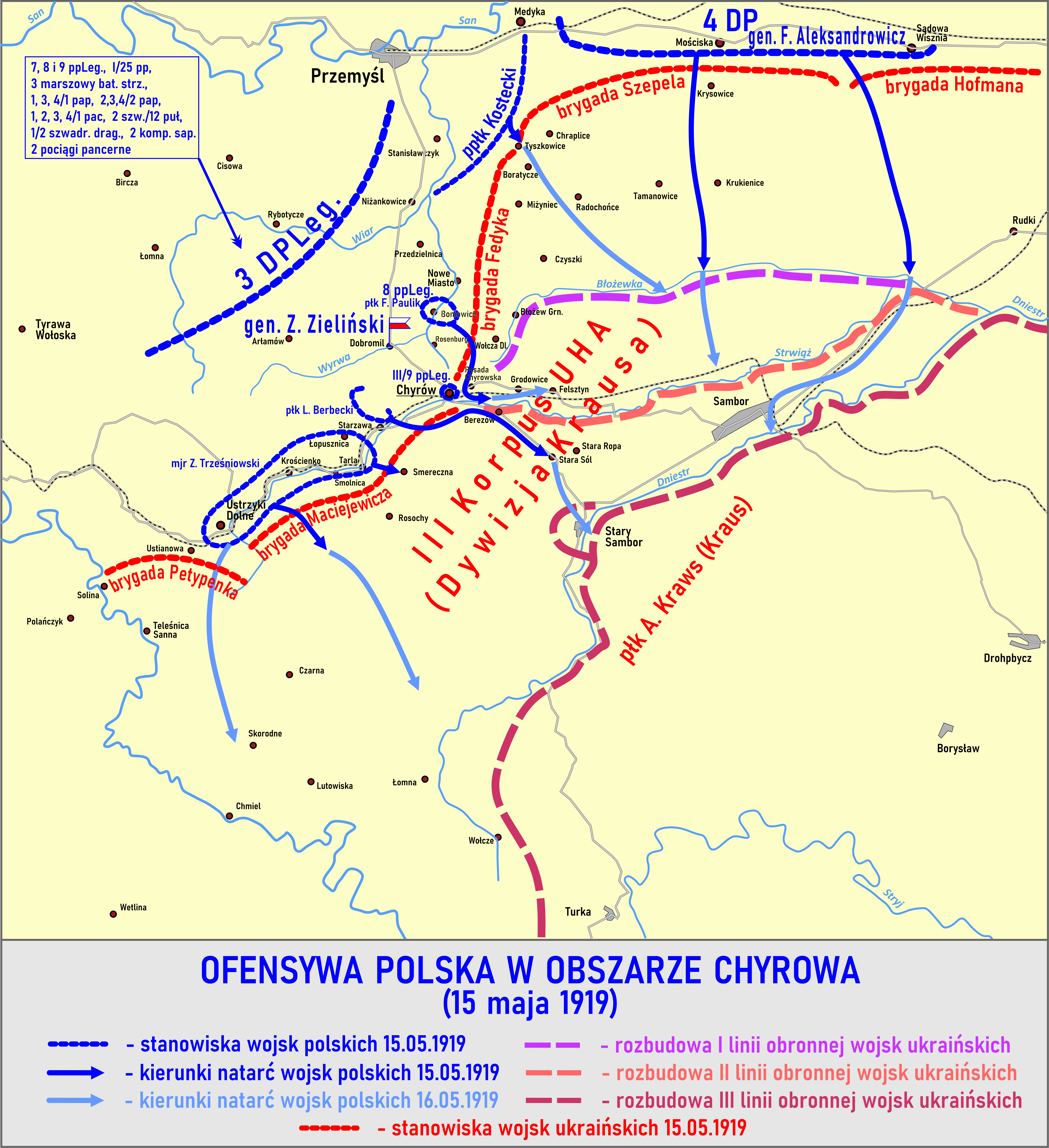
Polish breakthrough at Khyriv (Chyrów), 15-16 May 1919

The May offensive was a military campaign during the Polish–Ukrainian War. The Polish army under the command of Józef Haller launched the offensive against the forces of the West Ukrainian People's Republic, and as a result the Polish forces won, with most of Galicia being captured by the Polish army.

== Background ==
In November 1918 the Polish–Ukrainian War broke out between the newly established states of Poland and Ukraine. One of the main battles in the month took place in Lviv, Polish forces pushed out the Ukrainian Galician Army from the city, however the UGA began the siege of Lviv.

In February 1919 the Ukrainians attempted to capture Lviv. But after 5 days of fighting the Polish forces repulsed the Ukrainian attack, and on March 18th the siege of Lviv was broken.

=== Polish preparation for the offensive ===
In order to gain better positions before the general offensive planned for May, the Polish Army launched an operation code-named 'Jazda' on 19 April. A flurry of attacks supported by strong air power led to the repulsion of the Ukrainians from the Lubień Wielki-Bartatów-Skniłów line and the Poles reached the Glinna-Nawaria-Nadgórzany-Sołonka-Zubrza line.

At the end of April 1919, the Supreme Command of the Polish Armed Forces drew up a plan for an offensive against the West Ukrainian army in Eastern Galicia. The aim of the operation was to smash the Ukrainian army operating in Volhynia and Eastern Galicia, to ensure the safety of the Polish population living in these areas, to recapture areas of Eastern Galicia and to obtain a direct link between Poland and Romania.

=== Polish forces ===
Under the orders of General Józef Haller, considerable forces were grouped. Their core consisted of:

- I Corps under General Dominique Joseph Odry
- 1st Rifle Division of the Polish Army in France, commanded by Joseph Jean Bernard
- 2nd Rifle Division of the Polish Army in France, commanded by Louis Modelon
- Operational Group under General Aleksander Karnicki
- Group under General Wacław Iwaszkiewicz with his subordinated Operational Group under General Władysław Jędrzejewski
- 3rd Infantry Division of the Polish Legions, commanded by Henryk Minkiewicz
- 4th Infantry Division, commanded by Franciszek Aleksandrowicz

The total combat strength of the Polish troops scheduled for the operation was about 50,000 soldiers, 200 cannons and 900 machine guns. While the Ukrainian forces under the command of General Mykhailo Omelianovich-Pavlenko, had at that time around 44,000 troops, 552 machine guns and 144 cannons.

== The offensive ==
Polish offensive against the areas of Drohobych and Stanislaviv, 18-28 May 1919

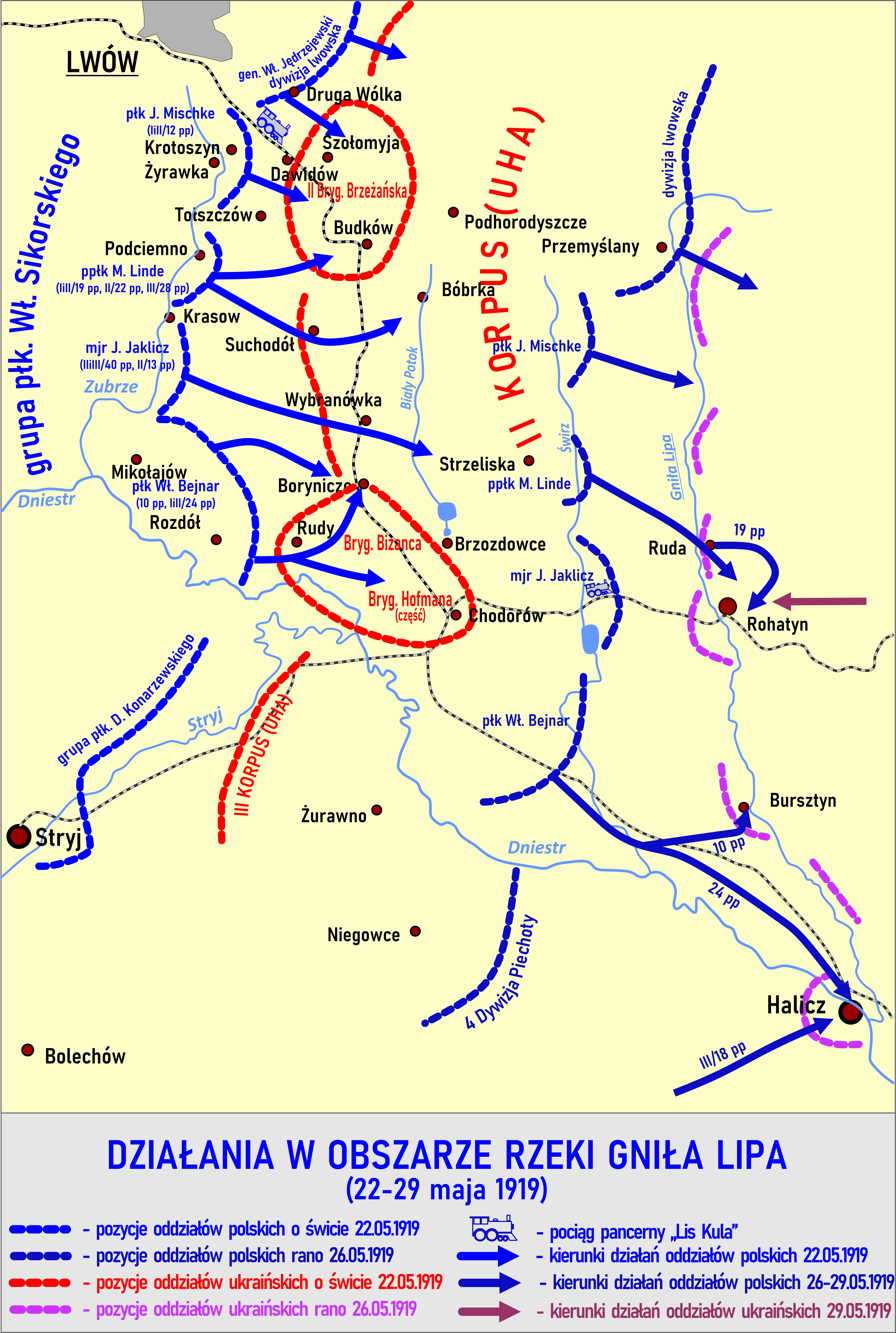
Map of the Polish offensive on Hnyla Lypa between 22 and 29 May 1919

On the 14th of May the offensive started. The Poles in Volhynia captured Mosty Wielkie and Sokal, at the same time Ukrainian forces were pushed out of Belz this ended the defense of Belz by Polish forces in a victory. On the 15th of May Polish forces led by Wacław Iwaszkiewicz-Rudoszański and Zygmunt Zieliński attacked Chyrów, this assault broke the front, forcing the entire Ukrainian III Corps to retreat behind the Dniester line. On the 17th of May the Polish army commanded by Henryk Minkiewicz attacked the Ukrainian forces near Kamianka-Buzka, it ended with the capture of the Lwów-Brody line and the pushing the remnants of the troops of the Ukrainian corps of ataman Osyp Mykytka towards the town of Busk. The next day forces commanded by Wacław Iwaszkiewicz-Rudoszański attacked Drohobych, The tough resistance of the Ukrainian army of General Mykhailo Omelyanovich-Pavlenko was broken and during the pursuit the 9th Małopolska Uhlan Regiment, Lt Stanislaw Maczek's assault company and the 37th Infantry Regiment took Drohobych.

On the 22nd of May after Polish forces captured the Boryslav-Drohobych line, pushed the Ukrainian forces out of the outskirts of Lviv, ending the half a year siege by the Ukrainian Galician Army. Józef Haller said this after ending the siege:

Soldiers! Under the mighty blow of your breastworks the entire enemy line has been broken and the enemy ring surrounding Lwów has disintegrated.... I trust that you will continue to exert all your strength and will bring about the final complete victory for the glory of the Republic of Poland.

— Józef Haller

On the 25th of May, Polish forces reached the Bolechów - Chodorów - Bóbrka - Busk line. At the same time, the Romanian army, together with the 4th Polish Rifle Division, began to occupy the south-western areas of ZURL (Pokucia). These areas included Kolomyja and Sniatyn. The next day Polish forces captured Ivano-Frankivsk. The remaining Ukrainian soldiers were interned by Czechoslovakia. On the 1st of June Polish forces captured Tarnopol.

== Aftermath ==
The offensive was a Polish success, and by the 1st of June the Ukrainian Galician Army found itself on the Ukrainian Death Triangle. Most of Galicia and Volhynia were captured by Polish forces. 2/3 of the UGA was destroyed, and the entire army was demoralized. Poland, in turn, was able to reach the borders with Romania, while cutting off the WUNR from Czechoslovakia - the only (not counting the UPR) trading partner of the West Ukrainian People's Republic.
