= Myron Tarnavsky =

Ukrainian military commander

- Мирон Тарнавський
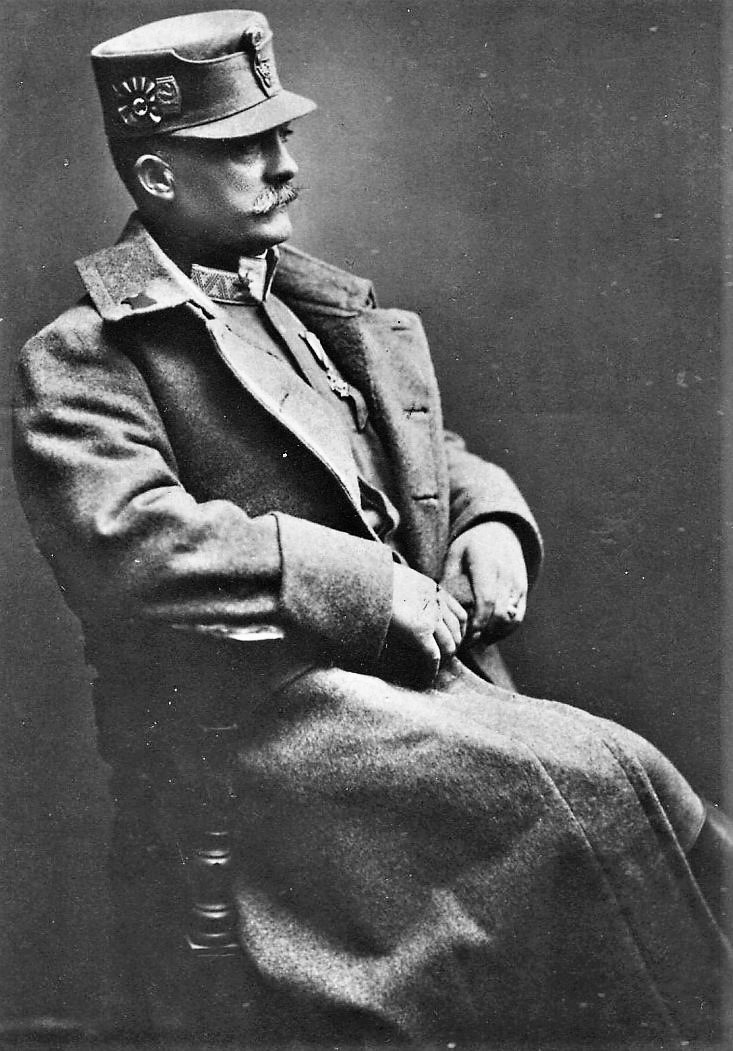
- Born: 29 August 1869; Baryliv, Kingdom of Galicia and Lodomeria, Austria-Hungary (now Ukraine)
- Died: 29 June 1938 (aged 68); Chernytsia, Second Polish Republic (now Ukraine)
- Military career
- Allegiance: Austria-Hungary (1890-1918); West Ukrainian People’s Republic (1918-1920)
- Branch: Austro-Hungarian Army; Ukrainian Sich Riflemen; Ukrainian Galician Army
- Service years: 1890-1920
- Rank: Brigadier general
- Conflicts: World War I; Ukrainian War of Independence; Polish-Ukrainian War; Battle of Tarnopol; Soviet–Ukrainian War; Ukrainian Anti-Soviet Campaign (1919)
- Awards: Iron Cross; Order of the Iron Crown

Myron Omelianovych Tarnavsky (Ukrainian: Мирон Омелянович Тарнавський; August 29, 1869 – June 29, 1938) was a supreme commander of the Ukrainian Galician Army, the military of the West Ukrainian People's Republic. In 1919 he signed a controversial armistice with the Volunteer Army, which resulted in his removal from command and eventual acquittal by a military tribunal.

== Early life ==
Tarnavsky was born into a family of priests in Baryliv, a village in the Lviv region. He attended a village grade school and a German gymnasium in Brody, and was later transferred to a gymnasium in Lviv, but abandoned studies and returned to his native village. Tarnavsky was then able to reenter the Brody gymnasium, graduating from it in 1890. According to his own memoirs, his favourite subjects were mathematics and physics.

He then served for one year in the Austrian military and due to his good performance was given the opportunity to pursue officer training in Lviv and, later, Vienna. After finishing compulsory service, he returned to Baryliv. After being noticed by Galician Sejm marshal Stanisław Badeni, he spent five months as an employee in the regional administration of Galicia, but eventually reentered military service.

== Military service ==
=== Austrian Army ===
In November 1892 Tarnavsky became a reserve lieutenant of the 4th Infantry Regiment based in Tarnów. Later he was transferred to the 18th Infantry Regiment based in Przemyśl, and eventually got promoted to Oberleutnant of the 33rd Infantry Regiment in Stryi. In 1899 Tarnavsky completed officer training in Vienna and was stationed in Sambir and, for a longer period of time, in Zolochiv where as an officer of the Austrian military he played an active role in local Ukrainian community life. Starting from 1919 he served as Hauptmann of the 35th Infantry Regiment.

With the outbreak of World War I in 1914, Tarnavsky was assigned to the front and fought against the Russian military in battles near Radyvyliv, Brody and Lviv. His unit was forced to retreat to Nowy Sącz, where Tarnavsky fell ill with dysentery, but recuperated. In late November 1914 he was seriously wounded in a battle near Storonevychi in the vicinity of Sambir. After several months of treatment, he returned to the Russian front, fighting near Slavsko in the Carpathian Mountains. In August 1915, when his unit was stationed together with Ukrainian Sich Riflemen near Pidhaitsi, Tarnavsky befriended sotnyk Dmytro Vitovsky.

=== Ukrainian Sich Riflemen ===
In 1916, Tarnavsky obtained the rank of major in the Austro-Hungarian army and transferred to the Ukrainian Sich Riflemen, heading the unit's training corps. Under his leadership, Sich Riflemen adopted a new model of military training with the help of German instructors. In June 1917 Tarnavsky commanded two rifle regiments in a battle near Kuropatnyky. His units' successful actions brought him the German Iron Cross and Austrian Order of the Iron Crown. In October 1917 Tarnavsky was promoted to command the entire Legion of Ukrainian Sich Riflemen. Under his command, between 29 November and 16 December the unit was engaged in the battle for the village of Hushtyn, and by 7 January 1918 had moved to Losiach. However, on the same day Tarnavsky was removed from his port by Austrian command as a result of his enthusiastic support for the Ukrainian People's Republic.

Following the 9 February 1918 agreement between Ukraine and Central Powers, Tarnavsky was transferred to Dnieper Ukraine, where he was employed at the headquarters of the Austrian 54th Division in Zhmerynka. He was eventually promoted to the rank of lieutenant colonel and given command of the 16th Infantry Regiment of Ukrainian Sich Riflemen, then stationed in central Ukraine. By the end of the war, his unit had been withdrawn to Kraków. Following the proclamation of Second Polish Republic, Tarnavsky was placed into a prisoner of war camp in Dąbie.

=== Ukrainian Galician Army ===
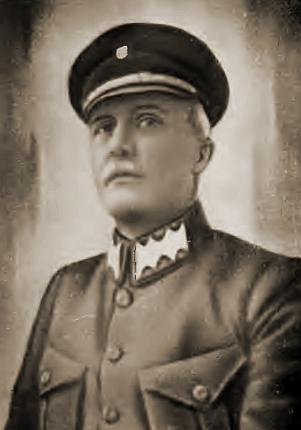
Tarnavsky in a uniform of Ukrainian Galician Army

At the end of 1918, Austria-Hungary collapsed and a Western Ukrainian state was declared in the formerly Austrian-controlled territory of Galicia. After being freed from prison, Tarnavsky moved to Stanislaviv and joined the Ukrainian Galician Army in February 1919, obtaining the rank of colonel. He commanded the "East" group of forces stationed near Kurovychi, and took part in Ukrainian attempts to recover Lviv. After participating in the Chortkiv Offensive, following which Ukrainian forces were driven out of Galicia by the Polish army, on 5 July Tarnavsky was promoted to the rank of brigadier general and became Supreme Commander of the Ukrainian Galician Army.

On his new post, Tarnavsky oversaw the Galician offensive on Kyiv, which ended with the city's liberation from the Bolsheviks on 30 August. However, soon thereafter Ukrainian forces had to retreat from the city according to an agreement with the White Army. By November 1919, the Galician Army had been decimated by a typhus epidemic and found itself in encirclement by the Poles, Reds and Whites. In order to save his force from total annihilation, on 6 November 1919 Tarnavsky arranged an armistice with the forces of Anton Denikin. According to the conditions of the treaty, forces of the Ukrainian Galician Army were incorporated into the structure of the White Army, where its fighters could receive needed rest and medical care. Galician soldiers preserved a neutral status and were not obliged to fight against forces of the Ukrainian People's Army.

As the armistice treaty had been signed without authorization from the Ukrainian policial leadership, Tarnavsky was relieved of duty by West Ukrainian dictator Yevhen Petrushevych and court-martialled. However, the process, which took place in Vinnytsia on 13-14 November, ended with his acquittal, and he was briefly reinstated as supreme commander.

== Later life ==
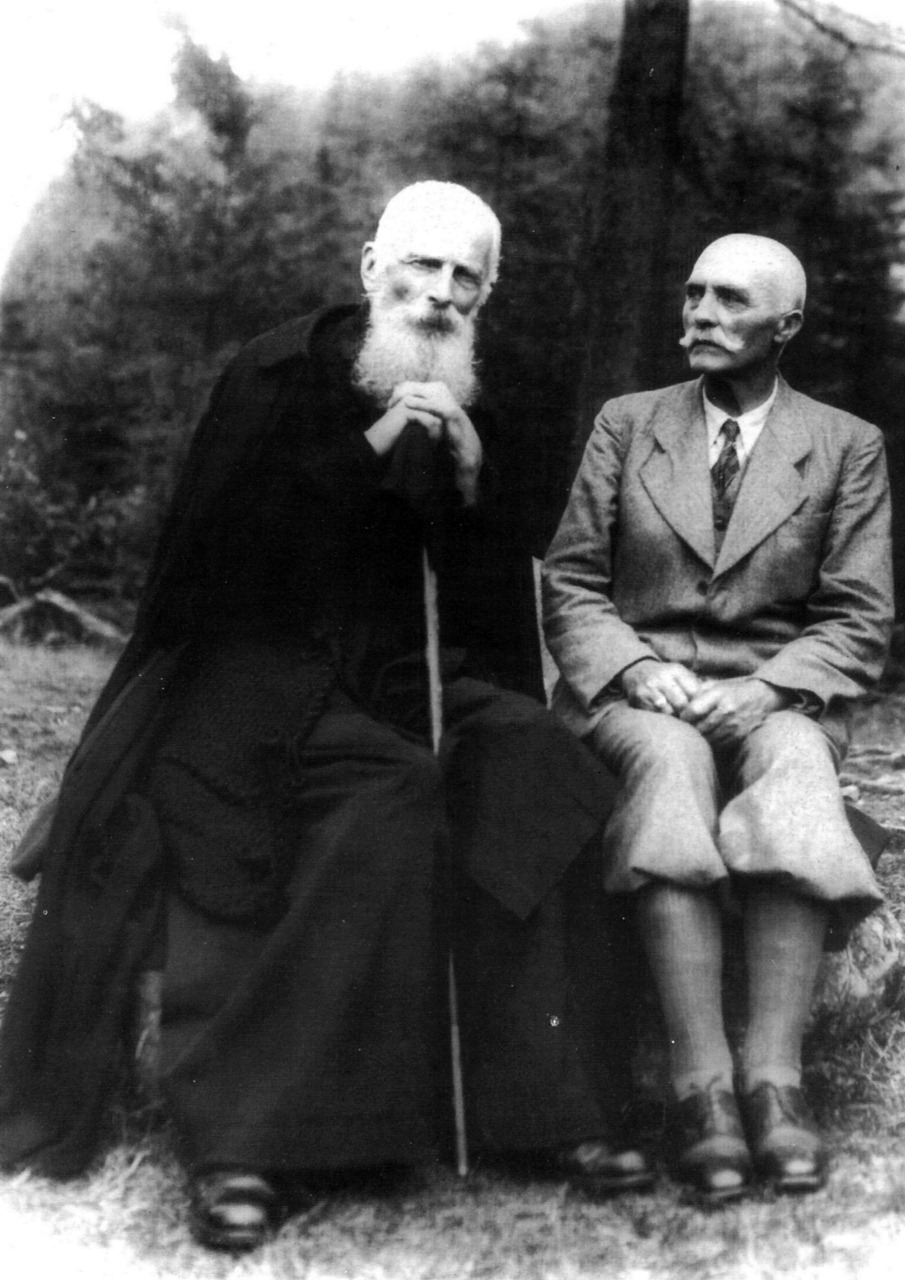
Tarnavsky (right) with Klymentiy Sheptytsky, 1930s

Following the alliance of Ukrainian Galician Army with the Red Army in early 1920, Tarnavsky spent some time hiding in Balta and Kyiv. After the retreat of Polish and Ukrainian troops from Kyiv in June, he returned to Galicia, and in July ended up in a Polish camp for prisoners of war in Tuchola. In October Tarnavsky was visited in the camp by Polish prime minister Wincenty Witos. In late 1920 he was released, but refused to follow most of the leadership of the defeated West Ukrainian People's Republic in emigration. Instead, the former general settled in the village of Chernytsia, not far from Brody, where he spent the rest of his life. In his later years, Tarnavsky supported friendly relations with metropolitan Andrey Sheptytsky, and cooperated with Prosvita and Shevchenko Scientific Society.

Myron Tarnavsky died on 29 June 1938. His funeral service, headed by Sheptytsky and organized by Roman Shukhevych and his business partner Bohdan Chaykivsky, took place in Lviv's St. George's Cathedral and gathered more than 20,000 members of the Ukrainian community from different regions, among them representatives of various civic organizations. Tarnavsky's body was interred on Lviv's Yaniv Cemetery.
