= Osyp Mykytka =

Ukrainian military officer

- Осип Микитка
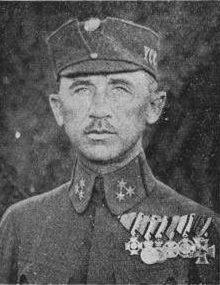
- Born: Йосип Микітка; 21 February 1878; Zalaniv, Kingdom of Galicia and Lodomeria, Austria-Hungary (now Ukraine)
- Died: 29 October 1920 (aged 42); Moscow, Soviet Russia
- Military career
- Allegiance: Austria-Hungary (1902-1918); West Ukrainian People’s Republic (1918-1919); South Russia (1919-1920)
- Branch: Austro-Hungarian Army; Ukrainian Sich Riflemen; Ukrainian Galician Army
- Service years: 1902-1920
- Rank: Major general
- Conflicts: World War I; Eastern Front; Balkan Front; Ukrainian War of Independence; Polish-Ukrainian War; Battle of Lemberg; May Offensive; Chortkiv Offensive; Battle of Tarnopol; Battle of Berezhany; Soviet–Ukrainian War; Battle of Kyiv (August 1919)
- Awards: Military Merit Cross; Military Merit Medal; Order of the Iron Crown

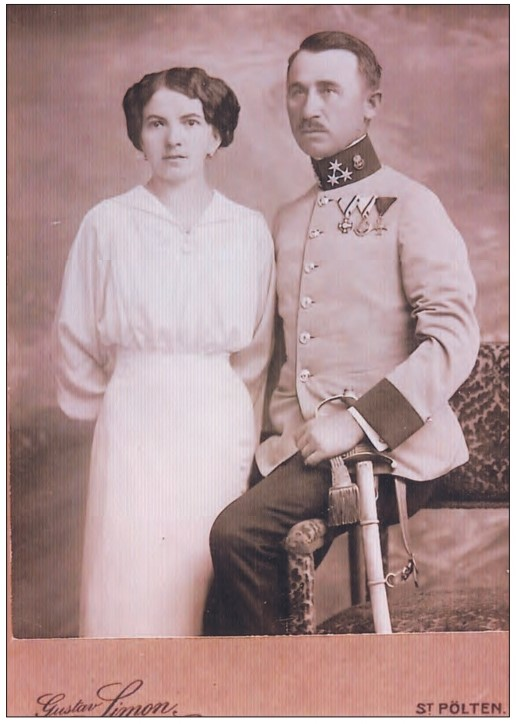
Osyp Mykytka with his wife Franziska in 1915

Osyp Mykytka (Ukrainian: Осип Микитка, 21 February 1878–29 October 1920) was a Ukrainian military officer, who reached the rank of major general in the Ukrainian Galician Army and served as a military commandant of Kyiv during the Soviet-Ukrainian War. After being arrested by the Cheka, he refused to join the Red Army and was executed by firing squad.

== Biography ==
=== Early life and service for Austria-Hungary ===
Osyp Mykytka was born on 21 February 1878 in Zalaniv near Rohatyn. According to records, the official spelling of his name was Yosyp Mykitka (Ukrainian: Йосип Микітка). Mykytka's father was a local teacher. After studying at a gymnasium in Przemyśl, Mykytka chose a military career. In 1902 he graduated from a cadet school in Vienna in the rank of lieutenant and subsequently underwent military service at the 21st Landwehr regiment stationed in Sankt Pölten. In 1911, in the rank of oberleutnant, he was transferred to the staff of 33rd Landwehr Corps in Stryi, which was recruited mostly from ethnic Ukrainians. In 1913 Mykytka enrolled into the officers' school in Sarajevo, from which he graduated on 1 August 1914 in the rank of hauptmann.

During the First World War, Mykytka initially served as an officer of the Austro-Hungarian Army on the Russian front, but in 1915 was transferred to Albania, where he commanded a battallion. During the same year, he was awarded Military Merit Cross. In 1916 he received the bronze and silver Military Merit Medals. In January 1918 Mykytka was appointed commandant of Ukrainian Sich Riflemen in the rank of sotnyk, which corresponded to hauptmann.

Following the Treaty of Brest, Mykytka's unit was transferred to Dnieper Ukraine, taking part in liberation of Odesa, Mykolaiv and Kherson from the Bolsheviks. In April 1918, Mykytka directed the riflemen's assault on Oleksandrivsk, eventually forcing Bolshevik troops to retreat from the city. Following that success, on 20 July 1918 he was awarded with Order of the Iron Crown.

=== Service in the Ukrainian Galician Army ===
At the time of the dissolution of Austria-Hungary, Mykytka was initially viewed by fellow Ukrainians with distrust due to suspicions of him being an Austrophile. As a result, he was removed from command during the November Uprising. However, he was soon able to prove himself as a capable officer and a patriot. On 5 November 1918 he headed a detachment of Ukrainian Sich Riflemen which established its base in Stare Selo near Lviv. By 11 November he had been put in command of a group of Ukrainian forces in the fights for Lviv. On 22 November units of the Ukrainian Galician Army were forced to retreat from the city. In January 1919 Mykytka headed the army's 1st Galician Corps, leading the defensive actions at Sokilnyky and Kozelnyky. He then headed the battle group "North" holding the front between Rava-Ruska and Sokal. In late March his unit performed a counterattack against Polish troops, and on 21-23 May took part in the fighting at Busk.

During the Chortkiv offensive, on 11-12 June 1919 Mykytka's corps captured Terebovlia from the Polish divisionen commanded by Władysław Sikorski. In the aftermath, Mykytka was promoted to the rank of colonel. On 15 June Mykytka's unit took part in the storming of Ternopil, and on 18 June proceeded to Zboriv, reaching Zolochiv on 22 June. His corps was able to take control of Brody and approached Lviv. On 1 July Mykytka participated in a counteroffensive action at Oliiv. Eventually, his unit ended up isolated from the rest of Ukrainian forces, and in mid-July 1919 Mykytka oversaw its successful retreat over the Zbruch. His command was positively evaluated by fellow Galician Army officer Stepan Shukhevych, who praised him for bravery and readiness to take the initiative.

After returning to Dnieper Ukraine, in late August 1919 Mykytka's corps took part in the taking of Kyiv, and he was appointed to serve as the city's military commandant. However Ukrainian troops were soon forced to leave Kyiv under pressure from Armed Forces of South Russia. On 21-22 October 1919, Mykytka's force defeated the White Army's 5th Division at Romaniv Khutir (modern-day Vinnytsia Oblast). On 1 November 1919, he was promoted to the rank of major general, and one week later he was appointed to command the Ukrainian Galician Army by a decree of Yevhen Petrushevych, dictator of the West Ukrainian People's Republic.

=== Alliance with the White Army and downfall ===
Due to a typhus epidemic and unwillingness of Galician soldiers to continue fighting against Denikin's troops, on 17 November 1919 Mykytka signed an agreement with Nikolai Shilling in Odesa, according to which the Ukrainian Galician Army was to become part of Armed Forces of South Russia in exchange for its sick and wounded soldiers being provided medical treatment. However, already in January 1920 White troops started a retreat from the area, and part of Galician troops took the side of the Bolsheviks. Mykytka opposed their decision and conducted negotiations on transferring battle-worthy units of the army to Romania.

On 12 February 1920, the newly established revolutionary committee of the Ukrainian Galician Army signed an agreement with the revolutionary military council of the Soviet 12th Army, according to which the force was incorporated by the Red Army and became known as Red Ukrainian Galician Army. The committee also issed a decree ordering Mykytka's arrest. After being detained in Odesa, he was delivered to Red Army command and transported to a concentration camp at Kozhukhovo near Moscow, where numerous Galician prisoners of war were kept.

On the initiative of Christian Rakovsky, Mykytka was offered to head one of the Red Army's divisions, but declined that proposal. As a result, he was transferred to Moscow along with fellow Galician Army officer Gustav Ziritz. At the insistence of Volodymyr Zatonskyi, Mykytka was sentenced to death, despite the absence of any formal conviction against him. According to a decree issued by the All-Russian Extraordinary Commission on 29 October 1920, he was executed by firing squad at the Lubyanka in Moscow.

== Legacy ==
One of the streets of Lviv has been named in honour of Osyp Mykytka.
