= Ukrainian anti-Soviet campaign (1919) =

Ukrainian Anti-Soviet Campaign
- Part of the Ukrainian–Soviet War
- Joint offensive of Ukrainian People's Army (violet) and Ukrainian Galician Army (blue) in August 1919
Date	July–September 1919
Location	Ukraine
Result	Ukrainian victory

Belligerents
Ukrainian People's Republic; West Ukrainian People's Republic	Russian SFSR; Ukrainian SSR

Commanders and leaders
Symon Petliura; Myron Tarnavsky	Alexander Yegorov; Nikolai Podvoisky

The Anti-Soviet Campaign in Ukraine was conducted by the joint UNA-Galician army against the Soviet forces, during July–September 1919.

== Prelude ==
After Ukrainian Galician Army moved to the East of Ukraine, they formed as joint army with UNA for an offensive against Soviets. The planned offensive was aimed in the directions of Kyiv and Odesa. Both the UNA and Galician armies were under one command of "Chief Ataman".

== Campaign ==
=== Beginning of fighting ===
The joint UNA-Galician begun their offensive, while suffering high attrition and shortage of ammunition. Despite this, the joint army was held by high morale. On 29 July, Ukrainian forces occupied Chornyi Ostriv and pushed out the Bolsheviks. They advanced towarads Mykolaiv and Shepetivka, clashing with Polish forces on the way. On 20 August, Ukrainians captured Zviahel. However, Ukrainian forces soon lost it due to Polish attack from the West and Bolshevik one from the East.

=== Kyiv Operation ===
On 24 August, Ukrainians defeated a large Bolshevik force and headed to Kyiv. On 24 August, Ukrainian forces defeated the last main Bolshevik force defending Kyiv north of Khvastiv. On 30 August, Ukrainian troops entered Kyiv and occupied it either on the following day. However, White army was also heading to Kyiv. After the volunteer army of Anton Denikin entered Kyiv on the same day and clashed with Ukrainian forces who held a parade, Ukrainian forces were forced to retreat from Kyiv. This defeat turned out to be demoralizing for the Galican army, but UNA still had a will to fight.

=== Further fighting ===
On 5 September, Ukrainians recaptured Zviahel from the Bolsheviks. On 5–13 September, Ukrainian forces clashed over control of Korosten, but were repulsed. Ukrainians launched an attack south of Vapniarka and Uman. Ukrainians forced 14th Soviet Army to retreat, leading to its encirclement by the White army. Ukrainians crossed on the North where Soviets made serious attempts to repulse them. Soviet troops consolidated near Zviahel-Korosten, and Ukrainians withdrew from Zviahel. On 20 September, Soviets occupied Zhytomyr. Ukrainian forces took up positions along the Shepetivka-Polonne railway and further east to the Zhytomyr-Berdychiv railway. After this move, both sides ceased their attacks.

== Aftermath ==
Despite numerous setbacks faced by the UNA-Galician army, this operation was considered to be their most successful independent offensive where Ukrainian forces liberated numerous cities. Bolsheviks were distracted with battles against White army and were planning to move in the direction of Moscow.
