= Nataliia Tarabalka =

Ukrainian volunteer (born 1974)

- Наталія Тарабалка
- Born: 24 October 1974; Kornych, Ivano-Frankivsk oblast, Ukrainian SSR, Soviet Union
- Occupations: Volunteer; community activist; military chaplain
- Known for: Founder of the "Warmth of the Winged Soul" health center in Tseniava
- Children: Stepan Tarabalka
- Awards: (2026)

Nataliia Volodymyrivna Tarabalka (Ukrainian: Наталія Володимирівна Тарабалка; born October 24, 1974) is a Ukrainian volunteer, community activist and military chaplain. She is the founder and head of the NGO “Know Your Dream” named after Stepan Tarabalka and also a founder of the "Warmth of the Winged Soul" health center in the village of Tseniava. She is a mother of the military pilot, Hero of Ukraine Stepan Tarabalka.

== Biography ==
Nataliia Tarabalka was born on October 24, 1974 in a village Kornych. She was religious from childhood: her worldview was influenced by her family history of Soviet repression. Her family kept the memory of two twin sisters, one of whom was associated with the Ukrainian underground and was deported to Siberia. A false accusation led to a long-standing conflict between the sisters, who reconciled only in old age.

In 1991, she finished a Kornych middle school. By education, she was a junior specialist in agriculture and worked as a saleswoman. She actively participated in the Orange Revolution and Euromaidan, where she helped with food and cooked. After the beginning of the Russian aggression against Ukraine in 2014, Tarabalka participated in initiatives for joint prayer for peace. Subsequently, in 2015–2022, she worked and lived in Portugal with her husband. After the start of the full-scale invasion, she returned to Ukraine.

Since 2022, after the death of her son Stepan Tarabalka, she began volunteering. On November 20, 2022, she founded the health center "Warmth of the Winged Soul" in the village of Tseniava, where qualified doctors, such as psychiatrists, psychologists, and rehabilitation specialists, work on the recovery of servicemen. Since May 2024, it has had a hospital where veterans can receive psychological assistance.

In 2023, at the Ukrainian-Portuguese Culture Festival, with the help of the Ukrainian diaspora, she raised over 10,000 euros, which went to restore the heating, repair the sewage system, and water supply of the center.

In April 2024, she joined the Military Chaplain Corps of the Ukrainian Armed Forces, becoming a chaplain. On September 20 of the same year, a joint project of the NGO "Know Your Dream" named after Stepan Tarabalka under the leadership of Nataliia Tarabalka and "Warm City" - "Warm Words" was presented. As part of the project, a library-reading room was equipped in the rehabilitation center "Warmth of the Winged Soul". On October 3 at 9 p.m., together with psychologist Anzhelika Barashovets, they stopped traffic at the intersection near Lyceum No. 1 in Kolomyia to honor the memory of the fallen defenders of Ukraine. At the end of November, she held a poetry evening at the philharmonic in Kolomyia, where she read her own poems.

In the autumn of 2025, she presented her author's book "My Strength is in Your Wings". She is also an active member of the Rotary Club Kolomyia.

== Awards and honors ==
- Member 3rd Class of the Order of Princess Olga (2026)
- "Responsibility Award-2024" from the Bohdan Hawrylyshyn Family Foundation (2024)
- Award "For Volunteer Activities" (2025)
- Blessed Emilian Kovch Prize (2025)
