= Saint Luke Church, Zolotnyky =

Church in Ternopil Oblast, Ukraine

Saint Luke Church
- Церква Святого Апостола Луки
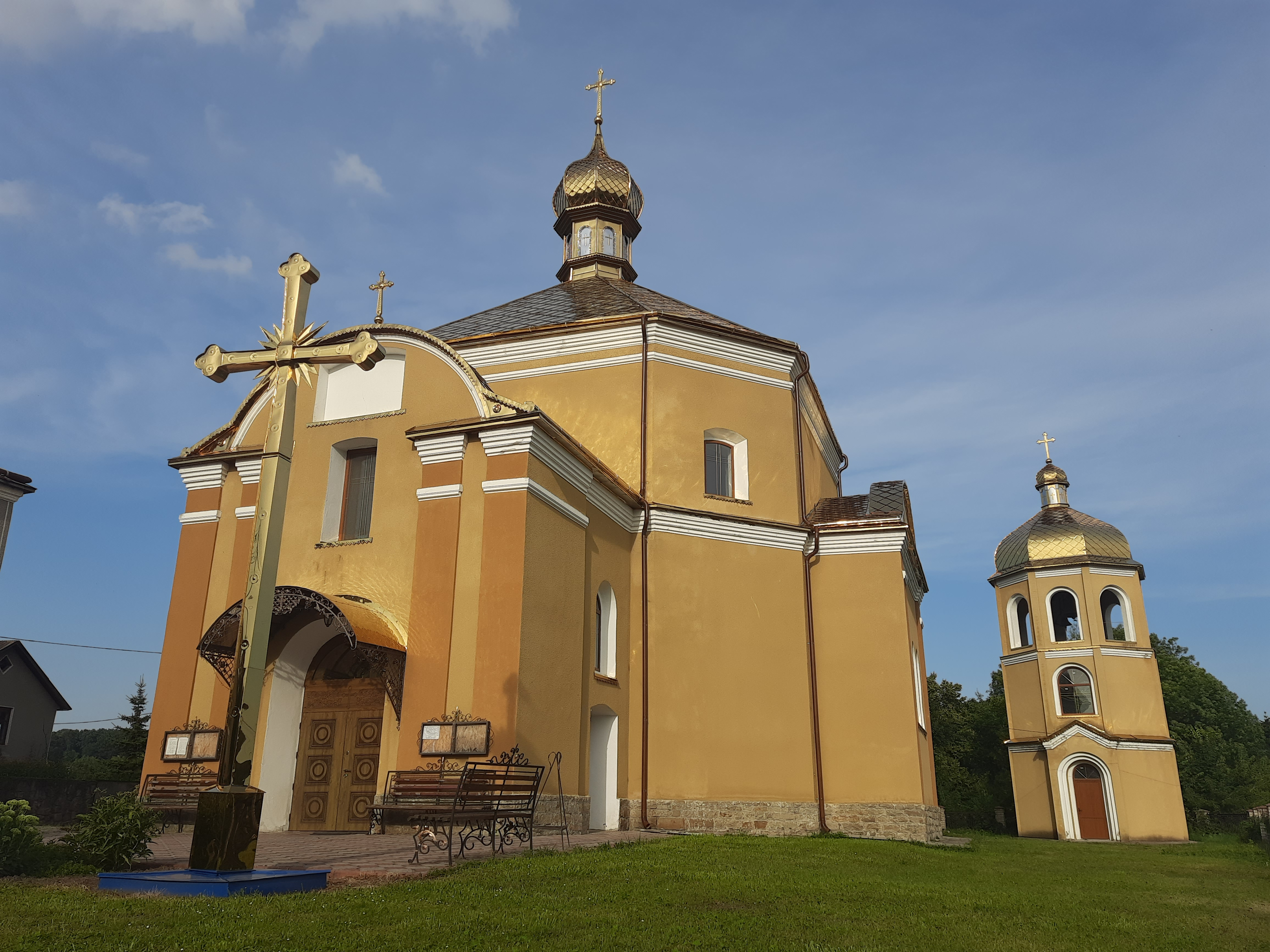

- Location within Ternopil Oblast

Religion
- Affiliation: Ukrainian Greek Catholic Church

Location
- Location: Zolotnyky, Zolotnyky rural hromada, Ternopil Raion, Ternopil Oblast, Ukraine
- Coordinates: 49°17′15″N 25°22′59″E

Architecture
- Completed: 1890

Saint Luke Church (Ukrainian: Церква Святого Апостола Луки) is a Greek Catholic parish church (UGCC) in Zolotnyky of the Zolotnyky rural hromada of the Ternopil Raion of the Ternopil Oblast.

== History ==
Construction of the church began in 1880 at the initiative of local residents. Five-sixths of the required amount was collected by the community, and the remaining funds were provided by the local gentry. The head of the construction committee was Mr. Buda, and the construction work was managed by the engineer Ferrari. The consecration of the church took place in 1890, and the parish was restored in 1991, when its charter was registered.

On 25 February 2013, an episcopal visitation was held, led by Metropolitan Vasyl Semeniuk. The following groups are active at the parish: the Sodality of Our Lady, the "Pope's Worldwide Prayer Network" brotherhood, the Altar Society, and the "Mothers in Prayer" community. The church also has two choirs: a senior choir and a youth choir named "Harmoniia".

== Priests ==
- at. Ivan Sendetskyi (until 1946),
- at. Ivan Yakymiv (1990–1991),
- at. Petro-Dmytro Kvych,
- at. Myroslav Petrushchak (since 1991).

== Sources ==
- (in Ukrainian) В. Бойко, Г. Івахів, В. Рудик, В. Уніят, Золотники // Ternopil Oblast. History of cities and villages: in 3 v. / Ternopil: "Terno-graph", 2014, V. 3: М—Ш, S. 268—271. — ISBN 978-966-457-246-7.
- "Złotniki (2), wś, pow. podhajecki". Geographical Dictionary of the Kingdom of Poland (in Polish). 14. Warszawa: Kasa im. Józefa Mianowskiego. 1895. p. 641.
