= W40 at the 2014 European Masters Athletics Championships =

The nineteenth European Masters Athletics Championships were held in Izmir, Turkey, from August 22–31, 2014. The European Masters Athletics Championships serve the division of the sport of athletics for people over 35 years of age, referred to as masters athletics.

== Results ==
=== 100 metres ===
Pos	Athlete	Country	Results
1st place, gold medalist(s)	Heike Martin	Germany	12.70
2nd place, silver medalist(s)	Emilia Paunica	Spain	12.85
3rd place, bronze medalist(s)	Cristina Sanulli	Italy	12.95

=== 200 metres ===
Pos	Athlete	Country	Results
1st place, gold medalist(s)	Emilia Paunica	Spain	25.91
2nd place, silver medalist(s)	Cristina Sanulli	Italy	25.93
3rd place, bronze medalist(s)	Nina Anderson	Great Britain	26.08

=== 400 metres ===
Pos	Athlete	Country	Results
1st place, gold medalist(s)	Nina Anderson	Great Britain	57.47
2nd place, silver medalist(s)	Emanuela Baggiolini	Italy	58.92
3rd place, bronze medalist(s)	Cristina Sanulli	Italy	1:00.08

=== 800 metres ===
Pos	Athlete	Country	Results
1st place, gold medalist(s)	Emanuela Baggiolini	Italy	2:14.93
2nd place, silver medalist(s)	Paola Tiselli	Italy	2:20.10
3rd place, bronze medalist(s)	Larisa Zhuk	Russia	2:22.49

=== 1500 metres ===
Pos	Athlete	Country	Results
1st place, gold medalist(s)	Paola Tiselli	Italy	5:13.79
2nd place, silver medalist(s)	Larisa Zhuk	Russia	5:15.87
3rd place, bronze medalist(s)	Clare Graham	Great Britain	5:18.63

=== 5000 metres ===
Pos	Athlete	Country	Results
1st place, gold medalist(s)	Mette Moehncke	Denmark	17:47.54
2nd place, silver medalist(s)	Paola Tiselli	Italy	18:45.53
3rd place, bronze medalist(s)	Sonia Marongiu	Italy	19:21.38

=== 10000 metres ===
Pos	Athlete	Country	Results
1st place, gold medalist(s)	Mette Moehncke	Denmark	37:27.74
2nd place, silver medalist(s)	Sonia Marongiu	Italy	42:47.47
3rd place, bronze medalist(s)	Marylaure Jame	France	45:08.18

=== 80 metres hurdles ===
Pos	Athlete	Country	Results
1st place, gold medalist(s)	Christina Boesch	Germany	12.53
2nd place, silver medalist(s)	Laila Petersone	Latvia	13.40
3rd place, bronze medalist(s)	Ebru Aykut Turker	Turkey	14.68

=== 400 metres hurdles ===
Pos	Athlete	Country	Results
1st place, gold medalist(s)	Sarah Burke	Great Britain	1:10.32
2nd place, silver medalist(s)	Vanessa de Luca	Sweden	1:13.90

=== 2000 metres steeplechase ===
Pos	Athlete	Country	Results
1st place, gold medalist(s)	Elena Rancheva	Bulgaria	8:05.54
2nd place, silver medalist(s)	Gabriele Artmann	Germany	8:14.36
3rd place, bronze medalist(s)	Clare Graham	Great Britain	8:31.04

=== 4×100 metres relay ===
Pos	Athletes	Country	Results
1st place, gold medalist(s)	Annette Koegst	Germany	51.85
1st place, gold medalist(s)	Christina Boesch	Germany	51.85
1st place, gold medalist(s)	Eva Guenther-Graeff	Germany	51.85
1st place, gold medalist(s)	Heike Martin	Germany	51.85
2nd place, silver medalist(s)	Mari Piir	Estonia	54.68
2nd place, silver medalist(s)	Tiia Eeskivi	Estonia	54.68
2nd place, silver medalist(s)	Erge Viiklaid	Estonia	54.68
2nd place, silver medalist(s)	Mikk Silja	Estonia	54.68
3rd place, bronze medalist(s)	Meral Calli	Turkey	1:02.25
3rd place, bronze medalist(s)	Hulya Tanriyasukur	Turkey	1:02.25
3rd place, bronze medalist(s)	Aycan Kurtcan	Turkey	1:02.25
3rd place, bronze medalist(s)	Hanife Sancak	Turkey	1:02.25

=== 4×400 metres relay ===
Pos	Athletes	Country	Results
1st place, gold medalist(s)	Vittoriana Gariboldi	Italy	4:12.08
1st place, gold medalist(s)	Paola Tiselli	Italy	4:12.08
1st place, gold medalist(s)	Gigliola Giorgi	Italy	4:12.08
1st place, gold medalist(s)	Maria Ruggeri	Italy	4:12.08
2nd place, silver medalist(s)	Mari Piir	Estonia	4:29.69
2nd place, silver medalist(s)	Tiia Eeskivi	Estonia	4:29.69
2nd place, silver medalist(s)	Kersti Lepik	Estonia	4:29.69
2nd place, silver medalist(s)	Mikk Silja	Estonia	4:29.69
3rd place, bronze medalist(s)	Janet Cardenas Ojito	Belgium	4:54.86
3rd place, bronze medalist(s)	Jocelyne Pater	Belgium	4:54.86
3rd place, bronze medalist(s)	Hilde Bottin	Belgium	4:54.86
3rd place, bronze medalist(s)	Benedicte Vandooren	Belgium	4:54.86

=== Marathon ===
Pos	Athlete	Country	Results
1st place, gold medalist(s)	Umran Demir	Turkey	3:41:57

=== High jump ===
Pos	Athlete	Country	Results
1st place, gold medalist(s)	Ayamba Akim	Great Britain	1.70
2nd place, silver medalist(s)	Laila Petersone	Latvia	1.63

=== Pole vault ===
Pos	Athlete	Country	Results
1st place, gold medalist(s)	Nataliya Menshenina	Russia	3.00
2nd place, silver medalist(s)	Claudia Cubbage	Great Britain	2.40

=== Long jump ===
Pos	Athlete	Country	Results
1st place, gold medalist(s)	Laila Petersone	Latvia	5.28
2nd place, silver medalist(s)	Maria Sokova	Russia	5.25
3rd place, bronze medalist(s)	Christina Boesch	Germany	4.94

=== Triple jump ===
Pos	Athlete	Country	Results
1st place, gold medalist(s)	Laila Petersone	Latvia	11.45
2nd place, silver medalist(s)	Maria Sokova	Russia	11.43
3rd place, bronze medalist(s)	Nataliya Menshenina	Russia	10.06

=== Shot put ===
Pos	Athlete	Country	Results
1st place, gold medalist(s)	Sue Lawrence	Great Britain	10.18
2nd place, silver medalist(s)	Daniela Lachat	Switzerland	9.86
3rd place, bronze medalist(s)	Irina Martiusheva	Russia	9.35

=== Discus throw ===
Pos	Athlete	Country	Results
1st place, gold medalist(s)	Bettina Schardt	Germany	38.97
2nd place, silver medalist(s)	Anna Ek	Sweden	35.24
3rd place, bronze medalist(s)	Sue Lawrence	Great Britain	33.73

=== Hammer throw ===
Pos	Athlete	Country	Results
1st place, gold medalist(s)	Tiina Ranta	Finland	41.91
2nd place, silver medalist(s)	Daniela Lachat	Switzerland	39.14
3rd place, bronze medalist(s)	Capkova Jana	Czech Republic	37.72

=== Javelin throw ===
Pos	Athlete	Country	Results
1st place, gold medalist(s)	Ulrike Friese	Germany	36.82
2nd place, silver medalist(s)	Erzsebet Rethey	Hungary	29.02
3rd place, bronze medalist(s)	Christina Boesch	Germany	28.57

=== Weight throw ===
Pos	Athlete	Country	Results
1st place, gold medalist(s)	Bettina Schardt	Germany	12.92
2nd place, silver medalist(s)	Anna Ek	Sweden	12.38
3rd place, bronze medalist(s)	Capkova Jana	Czech Republic	11.59

=== Throws pentathlon ===
Pos	Athlete	Country	Results
1st place, gold medalist(s)	Bettina Schardt	Germany	3249
2nd place, silver medalist(s)	Anna Ek	Sweden	3136
3rd place, bronze medalist(s)	Sue Lawrence	Great Britain	2812

=== Heptathlon ===
Pos	Athlete	Country	Results
1st place, gold medalist(s)	Christina Boesch	Germany	4541
2nd place, silver medalist(s)	Manuela Gross	Germany	4076
3rd place, bronze medalist(s)	Rebecka de Luca	Italy	3917

=== 5000 metre track race walk ===
Pos	Athlete	Country	Results
1st place, gold medalist(s)	Alexandra Lamas	Portugal	26:03.70
2nd place, silver medalist(s)	Vira Zozulya	Ukraine	26:31.39
3rd place, bronze medalist(s)	Edit Varasdy	Hungary	33:23.06

=== 10000 metre road race walk ===
Pos	Athlete	Country	Results
1st place, gold medalist(s)	Alexandra Lamas	Portugal	55:45
2nd place, silver medalist(s)	Edit Varasdy	Hungary	1:14:47
