= Capture of Halych =

1915 World War I offensive action in Galicia

- Part of the Eastern Front of World War I
- Patrol of the Ukrainian Sich Riflemen entering Halych, 28 June 1915
Date	27–28 June 1915
Location	Halych, Kingdom of Galicia and Lodomeria, Austria-Hungary
Result	Austro-Hungarian victory
Territorial changes	Halych recaptured by Austria-Hungary

Belligerents
Austria-Hungary	Russian Empire

Commanders and leaders
Alexander von Linsingen; Peter von Hofmann; Dmytro Vitovsky	Dmitry Shcherbachev

Strength
Ukrainian Sich Riflemen; 55th Infantry Division	11th Army

Casualties and losses
USS: 19 wounded (1 died of wounds, 2 captured)	~2,500 killed, wounded, or captured

The Capture of Halych (27–28 June 1915) was an offensive operation conducted by Austro-Hungarian Army units—spearheaded by the Legion of Ukrainian Sich Riflemen (USS)—against the Imperial Russian Army during the Great Retreat of World War I. The operation ended the Russian occupation of Halych, the historic capital of the medieval Principality of Halych, which had lasted since September 1914.

== Background ==
During World War I, Halych served as a key transport and strategic crossing on the Dniester River. Following the breakthrough of Russian defenses during the Gorlice–Tarnów offensive in May 1915, the German South Army under General Alexander von Linsingen and the Austro-Hungarian Corps of General Peter von Hofmann advanced eastward across Galicia.

In early June 1915, the 55th Infantry Division (including the 1st and 2nd Battalions of the Ukrainian Sich Riflemen) broke through Russian lines near Kalush and approached Halych via Krylos and Viktoriv.

== Battle ==
By mid-June, Austro-Hungarian forces engaged fortified Russian positions near Viktoriv. After the fall of Lviv on 22 June, the 131st Brigade—including a USS platoon led by Ostap Koberskyi—crossed to the left bank of the Dniester, threatening the rear of the Russian bridgehead. Consequently, units of General Dmitry Shcherbachev's 11th Army abandoned their fortifications and retreated across the Dniester.

Pursuing the retreating Russian forces, the 1st USS Battalion under Hryhorii Kossak and the 2nd USS Battalion under Vasyl Didushok entered Halych on 27 June 1915. Captain (sotnyk) Dmytro Vitovsky assumed command of the town, appointed a mayor, organized a local militia, and raised the blue-and-yellow Ukrainian flag alongside the Habsburg black-and-yellow banner atop the town hall. The display of Ukrainian national symbols provoked sharp protests from Hungarian Prime Minister István Tisza and resulted in a formal reprimand of Vitovsky by the Austro-Hungarian high command.

On 29–30 June, Didushok's battalion crossed the damaged Dniester bridge toward Semykivtsi and captured crossings over the Hnyla Lypa River in a bayonet assault, pushing Russian troops back to the Zolota Lypa River.

== Aftermath and significance ==
Halych suffered severe destruction during the fighting, including demolished bridges and damaged historic landmarks. In July 1915, photographers of the Austro-Hungarian Kriegspressequartier documented the town's ruins, military burials, and local landmarks, including the Karaite cemetery in Halych.

For the Ukrainian Sich Riflemen and the broader Ukrainian national movement, the capture of the ancient princely capital held deep symbolic significance as a milestone in the emergence of modern Ukrainian military traditions.

Guards at the Dniester bridge in Halych, 1915

View of Halych from Castle Hill, 1915

Austro-Hungarian staff car on the outskirts of Halych, June 1915

== Sources ==
- Dumin, Osyp (1936). Istoriia lehionu Ukrainskykh Sichovykh Striltsiv. 1914–1918 (in Ukrainian). Lviv. pp. 130, 337–365.
- Hantsiuk, Petro (2023). "Za Halych ishly na bahnety". Zberezhennia istoryko-kulturnoi spadshchyny Halytskoi zemli (in Ukrainian). Ivano-Frankivsk. pp. 24–34.
- Kersnovsky, Anton (1994). Istoriya Russkoy armii (in Russian). Vol. 3. p. 462. ISBN 978-5-7117-0180-4.
- Lazarovych, Mykola (2005). Legion Ukrainskykh sichovykh striltsiv: formuvannia, ideia, borotba (in Ukrainian). Ternopil: Dzhura. p. 124.
- Lytvyn, Mykola; Naumenko, Kim (1991). Istoriia halytskoho striletstva (in Ukrainian). Lviv: Kameniar. p. 28.
- Ripetskyi, Stepan (1956). Ukrainske Sichove Striletstvo: vyzvolna ideia i zbroinyi chyn (in Ukrainian). New York. p. 121.
- Rushala, K. (2017). "Halych na fotohrafiiakh z kolektsii Natsionalnoi avstriiskoi biblioteky u Vidni". Halych. Zbirnyk naukovykh prats (in Ukrainian) (2): 213–218.
- Zaklynskyi, Myron (1967). Dmytro Vitovskyi (in Ukrainian). Chervona Kalyna. pp. 32–33.
