= Nadrichne =

Nadrichne (Ukrainian: Надрічне) may refer to the following places in Ukraine:

- Nadrichne, Odesa Oblast, village in Bolhrad Raion
- Nadrichne, Berezhany urban hromada, Ternopil Raion, Ternopil Oblast
- Nadrichne, Zolotnyky rural hromada, Ternopil Raion, Ternopil Oblast
- Nadrichne, Volyn Oblast, village in Kamin-Kashyrskyi Raion
