= Mariya Orlyk =

Ukrainian politician (1930–2022)

- Марія Орлик
- Born: Mariya Andriivna Orlyk; March 15, 1930; Kosyshchevo, Monastyrshchinsky District, Smolensk Oblast, Russian SFSR, Soviet Union
- Died: December 2, 2022 (aged 92); Kyiv, Ukraine
- Occupations: Teacher, politician
- Years active: 1953–2022
- Spouse: Petro Ivanovich Orlyk
- Children: 1

Mariya Andriivna Orlyk (Ukrainian: Марія Андріївна Орлик; 15 May 1930 – 2 December 2022) was a Ukrainian teacher and Communist Party of the Soviet Union politician. She began teaching in the village called Zolotnyky in the Ternopil Oblast following her graduation from the Faculty of History of the Volodymyr Vynnychenko Central Ukrainian State Pedagogical University. in 1953. Orlyk taught history and was headmaster of the rural Zolotnikovskaya Secondary School. She served as a Deputy of the Supreme Soviet of the Ukrainian SSR between 1975 and 1989 and was deputy chair of the Council of Ministers of the Ukrainian SSR from April 1978 to 1990.

Orlyk was a member of the Central Committee of the Communist Party of Ukraine from 1981 and was an elected deputy of the Congress of People's Deputies of the Soviet Union from women's councils united by the Committee of Soviet Women between 1989 and 1991. She has been decorated with the Order of the Badge of Honour, the Order of the Red Banner of Labour, the Honored Worker of Culture of the Ukrainian SSR, all three classes of the Order of Princess Olga and the Recipients of the Order of Prince Yaroslav the Wise, 5th class.

== Early life ==
Orlyk was born in the village of Kosishchevo in the Monastyrshchinsky District, (today in the Smolensk Oblast) in Russia on 15 March 1930. She was the daughter of Russian working-class parents Andrii Mykytovych Isakov and Yevgenia Trifonovna, and has one elder brother. Orlyk and her family relocated to the Kirovohrad Oblast in 1933, in Nechayivka, which was where her maternal uncle resided. They fled from hunger that came as a result of the Soviet famine of 1930–1933. Both her parents found employment in their new place of residence of Kirovograd where they settled in 1935. She completed three classes at the school ZOSH No. 3 named after Olena Zhurliva prior to the Great Patrotic War. From 1949 to 1953, she attended the Faculty of History of the Volodymyr Vynnychenko Central Ukrainian State Pedagogical University.

== Career ==
Following her graduation in 1953, having mastered Ukrainian and the only one fluent in the language, Orlyk was sent to the village of Zolotnyky in the Ternopil Oblast. She began to teach history and later became headmaster of the local rural school called the Zolotnikovskaya Secondary School. Orlyk served as a history educator at Volodarskaya Evening School for working youth in the Kyiv Oblast from 1956 to 1957. She was also head of the Cabinet of Political Education at Volodar District Committee. From 1960, Orlyk became the deputy head of the Department of Kyiv's OK KPU and was appointed deputy head of the Kyiv City's executive committee in 1971.

She became a member of the Communist Party of the Soviet Union in 1955 and was a member of the Central Committee of the Communist Party of Ukraine (CPU) from 1981, having been a candidate member for the preceding five years. From 1975 to 1989, Orlyk served as a Deputy of the Supreme Soviet of the Ukrainian SSR, serving three four-term terms in its ninth to eleventh convocations after being selected to stand by the CPU. She was the elected chair of the Presidium of Ukrainian Friendship and Cultures between 1975 and 1978, which worked in cooperation with other friendship societies in more than 100 countries. Orlyk was, for 12 years, deputy chair of the Council of Ministers of the Ukrainian SSR from April 1978 to 1990. Her duties entailed the activities of the education ministries, culture, health care, social security, all humanitarian state committees, creative unions and multiple organisational committees. In 1990, she became the first member of government in Ukrainian history to tender her resignation voluntarily because of her long tenure in the post and her husband having a stroke. Orlyk was an elected deputy of the Congress of People's Deputies of the Soviet Union from women's councils united by the Committee of Soviet Women between 1989 and 1991. She served on the USSR Supreme Soviet Committee for Women, Family Protection, Motherhood and Childhood. In 2002, Orlyk was shortlisted by the second congress of the nationwide Ukrainian political association Women for the Future as a candidate for election to the Verkhovna Rada in the 2002 Ukrainian parliamentary election.

Orlyk accompanied Pat Nixon, the First Lady of the United States, when she and her husband, Richard Nixon, the President of the United States, visited Kyiv in 1972. Orlyk later went to the 25th session of the United Nations General Assembly in New York, United States of America as part of a Ukrainian delegation. She was the head of the Ukrainian delegation to the second World Conference on Women in Copenhagen in 1980 and the third World Conference on Women in Nairobi in 1985. On 3 May 1986, Orlyk became responsible or the socio-cultural sphere, the safety of children and schoolchildren in the aftermath of the Chernobyl disaster. She became head of the Women's Union of Ukraine, an association of citizens, in 1991, promoting the preservation of peace, harmony in society, Ukraine's independence and the social protection of women in market relations conditions. In 1995, Orlyk was head of the delegation of Ukrainian non-governmental women's organisations at the World Conference on Women in Beijing. She was the head of a Ukrainian government commission to seek traces of the library of Yaroslav the Wise in Mezhyhirya, and took part in the building of the Ukrainian State Museum of the History of the Great Patriotic War 1941–1945" memorial complex. In 2001, Orlyk was editor of the encyclopedia Women in Ukraine. She published the photo book Незабутнє at her friend's insistence in 2010.

== Personal life ==
For 37 years, she was married to the professor Petro Ivanovich Orlyk. They are the parents of one child.

== Awards ==
Orlyk received the Order of the Badge of Honour in 1971. She was awarded the Order of the Red Banner of Labour in 1980. The following year, Orlyk was made an Honored Worker of Culture of the Ukrainian SSR, and received a Diploma of the Presidium of the Supreme Soviet of the Ukrainian SSR. She has received all three classes of the Order of Princess Olga from 1997 to 2005. She was appointed to the Order's Third degree in 1997, was upgraded to the Second Degree in 2000, and finally the First Degree on 3 March 2005. On 16 January 2009, Orlyk became a recipient of the Order of Prince Yaroslav the Wise, 5th class.
