= Stanislaw Huzar =

Ukrainian military officer, educator, and translator (1892–1937)

Stanislav Huzar
- Станіслав Антонович Гузар
- Born: 3 July 1892; Kotuziv, Pidhaitsi County, Kingdom of Galicia and Lodomeria, Austria-Hungary
- Died: 25 November 1937 (aged 45); Odesa, Ukrainian Soviet Socialist Republic, Soviet Union
- Cause of death: Execution by shooting
- Education: University of Lviv
- Military career
- Allegiance: Austria-Hungary; West Ukrainian People's Republic
- Branch: Austro-Hungarian Army (Ukrainian Sich Riflemen); Ukrainian Galician Army
- Service years: 1914–1920
- Rank: Desiatnyk (USS); Khorunzhyi (UHA)
- Units: Ukrainian Sich Riflemen; Ukrainian Galician Army
- Commands: Squad commander, 1st Company, Legion of Ukrainian Sich Riflemen (1914–1917)
- Conflicts: World War I * Eastern Front ** Carpathian Winter War *** Battle of Makivka ** Gorlice–Tarnów offensive ** Great Retreat *** Capture of Halych *** Battle of Semykivtsi ** Brusilov offensive *** Battle of Lysonia ** Kerensky offensive Ukrainian–Soviet War * Odesa operation

Stanislav (Stakh) Antonovych Huzar (Ukrainian: Станіслав (Стах) Антонович Гузар, also transliterated as Stanislav Guzar; 3 July 1892 (Note: The birth date of 3 July 1892 is given by Petro Siredzhuk. Based on a 1937 arrest questionnaire, Andrii Boida cites 1893 as his birth year. Mykola Lazarovych believed Huzar was born in Buchach.) – 25 November 1937) was a Ukrainian military officer, educator, translator, literary editor, and publicist. A volunteer and desiatnyk (sergeant) in the Legion of Ukrainian Sich Riflemen (USS), he fought in the Carpathian Mountains, Podolia, and at Mount Lysonia. He later served as a khorunzhyi (ensign) in the Ukrainian Galician Army (UHA) and as an officer for special assignments attached to the UHA representative at the headquarters of White General Nikolai Shilling in Odesa.

Following the defeat of the Ukrainian War of Independence, Huzar declined to emigrate and remained in Odesa. During the 1920s and 1930s, he participated in the Ukrainization policy in Odesa and Kharkiv, teaching Ukrainian language and literature at institutes, technical schools, state institutions, and courses for Soviet civil servants. Simultaneously, he translated and edited books for the Kharkiv publishing houses Rukh and Mystetstvo.

His university acquaintance with Galician communist Vasyl Poraiko, who later became Prosecutor General of the Ukrainian SSR, provided Huzar with institutional protection for years. During the Great Purge, Soviet investigators used these connections, his correspondence with Galician figures, and his contacts with the Polish consulate to accuse him of "counter-revolutionary" activity and espionage. Sentenced to death by an NKVD troika, Huzar was executed in November 1937 and posthumously rehabilitated in 1989. He was the father of actor Volodymyr Huzar.

== Biography ==
=== Early life and education ===
Stanislav Huzar was born on 3 July 1892 in the village of Kotuziv, Pidhaitsi County, into the large family of Anton Huzar, an engineer and official at the Buchach magistrate. In the 1904/1905 academic year, Jan Stanisław (Stakh) Huzar attended Class I-A at the Buchach State Gymnasium, completing the second semester with a "first-grade" standing (Stopień pierwszy).

After graduating from the gymnasium in Buchach, he enrolled in the Faculty of Law and Political Science at the Francis I University of Lviv, studying there in the final pre-war years. As a university student, he became acquainted with Professor Kyrylo Studynsky, in whose Lviv apartment Huzar's sisters lived. Among them was Stefaniia, who later married Legion of Ukrainian Sich Riflemen captain and major Semen Horuk.

During this period, Huzar also met Vasyl Poraiko. During his 1937 interrogation, Huzar testified that Poraiko also maintained close contact with Studynsky. Poraiko's studies under Studynsky are corroborated by his faculty registration card: in the summer semester of 1912/1913, the law student attended Studynsky's elective course on Ipatii Potii (one hour per week) alongside Mykhailo Hrushevsky's lectures on Eastern European history. Huzar later stated that from 1908 onward his worldview took on a distinct Ukrainian national orientation shaped by gymnasium teachers and Greek Catholic priests.

After completing his higher education, Huzar worked as a judicial trainee. He was fluent in Polish, German, and Russian. During World War I, he visited his sisters at Studynsky's home, for the last time during a front-line leave in 1916. In late July 1917, his sisters Stefaniia and Mariia died of mushroom poisoning and were buried at Lychakiv Cemetery. (Note: In an article in Ukraina: kulturna spadshchyna, natsionalna svidomist, derzhavnist, Andrii Boida, citing K. Naumenko, lists Stefaniia's lifespan as 1887–1916 and attributes the July 1917 mushroom poisoning death only to Mariia.) Huzar never returned to Galicia thereafter.

=== Military service ===
==== Legion of Ukrainian Sich Riflemen ====
Huzar testified that in 1913, together with Vasyl Poraiko, Hryhorii Kossak, Ilko Tsiokan, Oleksandr Badan-Yavorenko, and other Galician university and gymnasium youths, he joined the Ukrainian paramilitary society Sich Riflemen.

Following the outbreak of World War I, on 5 August 1914, he volunteered as a resident of Buchach for the Legion of Ukrainian Sich Riflemen (USS). He arrived at the USS assembly point in Stryi on 3 September 1914 as a one-year volunteer. That same month, he was promoted to vistun (legion corporal) and appointed squad commander in the 1st Company, deploying with it to the Eastern Front on 26 September 1914.

Between 1914 and 1917, Huzar fought in the Legion's campaigns with the 1st Company, as confirmed by the 1 June 1916 USS personnel roster supplemented by Mykola Lazarovych. However, an interrogation protocol dated 8 September 1937 records that in early 1915 Huzar went absent without leave, lived in Buchach for a time, and later rejoined a USS battalion in the village of Rozvadiv. Historian Andrii Boida notes that the reliability of these coerced interrogation statements is difficult to verify.

Huzar is likely the author of the frontline sketch "Pid Sokolovom" ("Near Sokoliv"), published in April 1916 in the Riflemen's journal Shliakhy under the byline "Stepan Huzar". Boida points out that no rifleman named Stepan Huzar ever served in the Legion, suggesting Stanislav used a pseudonym. In August–September 1916, Huzar fought at Mount Lysonia, and on 16 September he was promoted to desiatnyk (titular Zugsführer). On 30 September 1916, he witnessed the Battle of Potutory, in which USS units suffered heavy casualties; Huzar narrowly escaped capture while his brother-in-law Semen Horuk was taken prisoner by Russian forces. Huzar was the first to inform his sister Stefaniia of Horuk's capture by letter.

On 21 June 1917, he was transferred as a clerk to the Main Intendancy of the Austro-Hungarian 2nd Army in Pidhaitsi. Later that year, alongside his platoon from the 1st USS Company, Huzar ended up at the headquarters of General Peter von Hofmann's corps. According to his account, he had become separated from his unit during a front-line retreat, initially escorted columns of Russian prisoners of war to rear areas, and was subsequently appointed Slavic-language interpreter at corps headquarters. In this capacity, he arrived in Kyiv on 30 June 1918 and soon relocated to Odesa, serving in an engineering unit with the rank of junior non-commissioned officer.

==== Ukrainian War of Independence ====
In Odesa, Huzar frequented the local branch of the Prosvita society on Malyi Lane, where he met Dr. Vasyl Hukevych, who introduced him to local Ukrainian civic and political circles—including Hetmanites, supporters of the Central Council of Ukraine, Socialist Revolutionaries, and an underground group of Borotbists opposed to Hetman Pavlo Skoropadskyi. That year, Huzar befriended several Borotbists, including Babii, the brother of his then-partner. Babii took a keen interest in the condition of Austro-Hungarian troops and supported the unification of Galicia with Dnieper Ukraine. Huzar noted that his other Borotbist acquaintances shared these views, making news of their merger with the Bolsheviks in winter 1920 unexpected, though he later interpreted it as a tactical political maneuver.

In autumn 1918, Huzar contracted the Spanish flu and was not evacuated with the retreating Austro-Hungarian forces. Upon recovering, he returned to his engineering unit's quarters at 16 Preobrazhenska Street, finding the unit already gone. There he met Colonel Berkovych-Borota, who was liquidating former Austro-Hungarian military property in coordination with the French command and assigned Huzar to guard one of the rooms. Around the same time, he met former USS officer candidate otaman Tryfon Yaniv.

When French forces ordered their allies to withdraw, Yaniv invited Huzar to Baron Borys Shteinhel's apartment at 25 Katerynynska Street. On 24 February 1919, Yaniv, Shteinhel, and Ukrainian People's Army officer Marushchak planned to travel by car to Romania and onward to Austria, taking Huzar along as an armed guard. However, Cheka operatives raided the apartment that night, arresting all four men and confiscating weapons along with a chest containing over two million in various currencies. Yaniv and Shteinhel were soon executed by the Bolsheviks, while Marushchak and Huzar were held in custody until June 1919.

After his release, Huzar remained in Odesa, which came under the control of the Armed Forces of South Russia in summer 1919. When units of the Ukrainian Galician Army (UHA) arrived in the city in November 1919, Huzar met an old acquaintance, chetar Nestor Nyzhankivsky. On Nyzhankivsky's advice, Huzar approached otaman Vasyl Orobko, the UHA representative at the headquarters of White General Nikolai Shilling. Orobko offered him a commission in the UHA with a promotion from vistun to khorunzhyi. Huzar's fluency in Russian and familiarity with Odesa secured him the post of officer for special assignments at the headquarters, a position he held for roughly three months from November 1919 to January 1920.

During the White evacuation of Odesa, Huzar, together with captain Yulian Olesnytskyi and otaman Vasyl Orobko, obtained visas through White officials from French General Philippe d'Anselme to depart abroad aboard a French ship via Constantinople. Nevertheless, Huzar declined to emigrate, explaining that many Galicians remained in the city and a vibrant Ukrainian civic community had formed there. He maintained ties with local Ukrainian intellectuals, including Vasyl Hukevych, Professor Arkadii Osmialovskyi and his brother Oleksandr, Professor Bahinskyi, lecturer Panchenko, and People's Commissariat of Education official Klochko.

=== Interwar period ===
In 1921, Huzar was appointed lecturer in physical education and Ukrainian language at the branch of the Odesa Institute of People's Education in the village of Isaieve, a post offered by Professor Osmialovskyi, whom he knew from the war years and who headed the branch. Huzar moved to Isaieve with his wife Nina. His presence there was noted in August 1921 in the newspaper Ukrainskyi Vistnyk by Galician émigré Sydir Bobykevych.

In summer 1922, Huzar returned to Odesa. That autumn, learning from the press of the Ukrainian SSR government's decree on Ukrainization of the state apparatus, he applied on Hukevych's advice to the guberniya political-educational department at 10 Baranova Street. He was registered as a Ukrainian-language instructor and subsequently tasked with conducting Ukrainization courses for the guberniya militia, telephone exchange, and postal service. In 1927–1928, he taught Ukrainian to students at the Odesa Medical Institute and the Odesa Polytechnic Institute.

In 1927, the Joint State Political Directorate (GPU) arrested Huzar in Odesa, holding him in custody for three months. He was released through the intervention of Vasyl Poraiko, then People's Commissar of Justice and Prosecutor General of the Ukrainian SSR. Thereafter, the two maintained periodic contact; in 1929, at Huzar's request, Poraiko facilitated the release from custody of Karavodin, head of the tax department at the Odesa Finance Office.

In late 1930, Huzar traveled to Kharkiv hoping to find literary work, but fell ill and was left without money or contacts. He wrote to Poraiko, then Deputy Chairman of the Council of People's Commissars of the Ukrainian SSR, who referred him to Deputy Commissar of Justice Anton Prykhodko. Prykhodko instructed Lev Akhmatov to backdate Huzar's appointment as a district prosecutor in Kharkiv, pay him a portion of the salary, and formally dismiss him, providing him with funds and travel documents back to Odesa.

In early 1931, Huzar moved permanently to Kharkiv and again asked Poraiko for help with housing and employment. Through Prykhodko, he obtained a room in the dormitory of the People's Commissariat of Justice school at 21 Yaroslavska Street. On Poraiko's recommendation, Rukh publishing house editor-in-chief Anton Berezynskyi hired Huzar as a translator, where he translated books and pamphlets from Russian and Polish. According to Huzar's later testimony, he had secured Poraiko's favor by claiming to be a relative of prominent UHA captain Roman Huzar. For several months he taught Ukrainization courses at the Paibud and Metaltrest agencies, and from June 1932 to January 1933 he worked as a literary editor at the Mystetstvo publishing house.

Huzar resumed his pre-war correspondence with Kyrylo Studynsky only in the interwar years. In 1933, he asked the professor for help locating the new addresses of his brother and sister in Poland, receiving two postcards with addresses and US$28 in reply. He also corresponded with Studynsky's daughter, Iryna Tysovska, sending her a poem titled "The Adventures of the Good Soldier Švejk" for publication in the Galician press and describing in letters the devastating effects of the Holodomor famine of 1932–1933 and food prices. In February 1934, on the advice of Galician acquaintances, he visited the Polish consulate in Kharkiv seeking documents and financial assistance; the consul gave him 40 rubles and invited him for a follow-up visit. In autumn 1934, Kharkiv-based Galicians Severyn Levytskyi and Mykhailo Baran told Huzar that Studynsky was regarded as a prominent nationalist figure and one of the leaders of a "Ukrainian fascist organization" in Lviv. Until May 1936, Huzar occasionally wrote to Studynsky, complaining of ill health and financial hardship and requesting monetary aid.

In summer 1934, Poraiko relocated to Kyiv, and having lost his patron's protection, Huzar returned to Odesa. There he taught at a canning technical college and on nursing courses. In 1935–1936, the Polish consul corresponded with him and forwarded money sent by his brother Volodymyr from Galicia. In late 1935 or early 1936, as a former Austro-Hungarian soldier, Huzar asked the German consulate in Odesa for assistance in obtaining military service records, but his request was denied.

=== Arrest and execution ===
In a report dated 25 July 1937, Odesa Oblast NKVD operative Horbonos labeled Huzar an "outspoken chauvinist" who maintained contact with Kyrylo Studynsky and Severyn Levytskyi and sent them "counter-revolutionary" letters and writings. An arrest warrant was signed on 22 August by H. Hryshyn-Shenkman, head of the 3rd Department of the NKVD State Security Directorate. On the night of 24 August 1937, NKVD officers arrested Huzar at his apartment at 22 Pastera Street, confiscating books, a photo album, correspondence, and his Soviet passport.

Investigators interrogated Huzar twice, on 5 and 8 September 1937. At the first session, he denied any involvement in "counter-revolutionary organizations" or espionage. At the second—likely under interrogation pressure—he gave extensive testimony regarding Odesa and "Kharkiv" circles of Galician intelligentsia, into which investigators also grouped Poraiko. He was further accused of having joined a "counter-revolutionary nationalist organization" of lecturers and students at the Isaieve branch of the Odesa Institute of People's Education in 1922. On 29 October 1937, an NKVD troika of Odesa Oblast sentenced Stanislav Huzar to death by shooting for ties to the Polish consulate and "espionage and sabotage activities". The sentence was carried out in Odesa on the night of 25 November 1937. (Note: 1989 rehabilitation documents erroneously record the execution date as 28 November.)

On 10 April 1989, the Odesa Oblast Prosecutor's Office posthumously rehabilitated Huzar pursuant to the 16 January 1989 Decree of the Presidium of the Supreme Soviet of the Soviet Union "On Additional Measures to Restore Justice in Respect of Victims of Repressions".

== Historical assessment ==
Ukrainian historian Andrii Boida characterizes Huzar as a man of his era striving to survive in Odesa and Kharkiv, noting that while Huzar was neither a Communist Party member nor an ideological communist, the Ukrainian SSR offered him professional opportunities unavailable in Polish-ruled Galicia or elsewhere. According to Boida, Huzar's career was shaped primarily by the Galician expatriate network and the Ukrainization policy, with Vasyl Poraiko exerting the greatest influence on his fate. In a subsequent study, Boida describes Huzar's trajectory as typical of Galicians who remained in Soviet Ukraine by force of circumstance, sincerely believing in the promise of Ukrainization and seeking to serve their people without foreseeing the fatal consequences of that choice. Boida also cautions that Huzar's criminal case file is heavily laden with ideological clichés and potential fabrications, requiring critical source evaluation of his interrogation transcripts.

== Works ==
- Huzar, S. (April 1916). "Pid Sokolovom" [Near Sokoliv]. Shliakhy (in Ukrainian) (9–10): 319–321.

== Family ==
- Parents:
  - Anton Huzar — father, engineer and official at the Buchach magistrate.
- Siblings:
  - Volodymyr Huzar — brother, schoolteacher in the village of Vozyliv; lived in Galicia during the 1930s.
  - Stefaniia Huzar (married name Horuk; d. 1917) — sister, wife of USS major Semen Horuk.
  - Anna Huzar — sister, schoolteacher in the village of Strusiv.
  - Sofiia Huzar — sister.
  - Mariia Huzar (d. 1917) — sister.
- Spouses and children:
  - Nina — first wife, with whom he moved to Isaieve in 1921.
  - Olha Stanislavivna Huzar (married name Zubkova; 1923–1989) — daughter from his first marriage.
  - Oleksandra Krat (Krakht, Mediuk; 1906–1994) — second wife.
  - Volodymyr Huzar (1925–2009) — son from his second marriage, stage and film actor.
  - Olena Yosypivna Brodska — third wife, lawyer and member of the Odesa bar association.

== Sources ==
=== Secondary sources ===
- Boida, Andrii (2026). "Vasyl Poraiko v zhytti odesyta Stanislava Huzara (1893–1937)". Pivdennyi zakhid. Odesyka (in Ukrainian) (40): 212–228.
- Boida, Andrii (2026). "Istorychnyi portret ususivtsia Stanislava Huzara: shliakh vid ukrainskoho sichovoho striltsia do radianofila". Ukraina: kulturna spadshchyna, natsionalna svidomist, derzhavnist (in Ukrainian) (43): 278–291. doi:10.33402/ukr.2026-43-278-291.
- Lazarovych, Mykola (2005). Lanovyk, B. D. (ed.). Legion Ukrainskykh sichovykh striltsiv: formuvannia, ideia, borotba (in Ukrainian). Ternopil: Dzhura. p. 592. ISBN 966-8017-92-7.
- Naumenko, Kim (2013). Slavnyi syn Sniatynshchyny otaman Sen Horuk (in Ukrainian). Mykolaiv: PP Oshchypok M. M. p. 56.
- Ostroverkha, Mykhailo (1962). Hrona kalyny — v Ukrainskykh sichovykh striltsiv (in Ukrainian). New York: Ukrainian Free University Foundation. p. 134.
- Popovych, S. (2006). "Otaman Sen Horuk: Rozpovid pro slavnoho komandyra Ukrainskykh Sichovykh Striltsiv". Dzvin (in Ukrainian) (3): 77–90.
- Siredzhuk, Petro (2025). Pokutska sotnia sotnyka USS Senia Horuka (in Ukrainian). Lviv: Piramida. ISBN 978-966-442-865-8.

=== Primary sources ===
- Bobykevych, Sydir (23 August 1921). "Visty z toho boku". Ukrainskyi Vistnyk (in Ukrainian). No. 167. p. 4.
- Huzar, Stanislav (April 1916). "Pid Sokolovom". Shliakhy (in Ukrainian) (9–10): 319–321.
- VI. Sprawozdanie Dyrekcyi c. k. Gimnazyum w Buczaczu za rok szkolny 1905 (PDF) (in Polish). Buczacz: Nakładem Funduszu Naukowego. 1905. p. 90.
- "Personalangelegenheiten". Verordnungsblatt für die kaiserlich-königliche Landwehr (in German) (102). Wien: K. u. k. Kriegsministerium: 1514. 1919.
