= Pantalykha =

Rural locality in Ternopil Oblast, Ukraine

Pantalykha Панталиха
- Location in Ternopil Oblast
- Coordinates: 49°18′58″N 25°27′28″E
- Country: Ukraine
- Oblast: Ternopil Oblast
- Raion: Ternopil Raion
- Hromada: Zolotnyky rural hromada
- Time zone: UTC+2 (EET)
  - Summer (DST): UTC+3 (EEST)
- Postal code: 48114

Pantalykha (Ukrainian: Панталиха) is a village in Zolotnyky rural hromada, Ternopil Raion, Ternopil Oblast, Ukraine.

== History ==
The first written mention of the village was in 1683.

After the liquidation of the Terebovlia Raion on 19 July 2020, the village became part of the Ternopil Raion.

== Religion ==
- St. Paraskeva church (2004, UGCC).

== Sources ==
- (in Ukrainian) Рогальський В., Панталиха // Ternopil Encyclopedic Dictionary: in 4 v. / editorial board: H. Yavorskyi and other, Ternopil: "Zbruch", 2008, V. 3: П—Я, S. 23. — ISBN 978-966-528-279-2.
- "Pantalicha". Geographical Dictionary of the Kingdom of Poland (in Polish). 7. Warszawa: Kasa im. Józefa Mianowskiego. 1886. p. 845.
