= Hnylovody =

Rural locality in Ternopil Oblast, Ukraine

Hnylovody Гниловоди
- Village
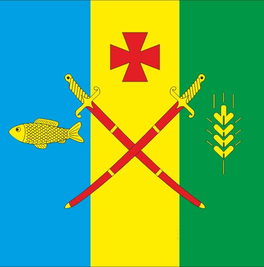
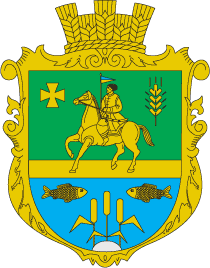
- Flag Coat of arms

- Location in Ternopil Oblast
- Coordinates: 49°13′10″N 25°16′18″E
- Country: Ukraine
- Oblast: Ternopil Oblast
- Raion: Ternopil Raion
- Hromada: Zolotnyky rural hromada
- Time zone: UTC+2 (EET)
  - Summer (DST): UTC+3 (EEST)
- Postal code: 48141

Hnylovody (Ukrainian: Гниловоди; 1965–2024 – Hvardiiske) is a village in Zolotnyky rural hromada, Ternopil Raion, Ternopil Oblast, Ukraine.

== History ==
The first written mention of the village was in 1785.

After the liquidation of the Terebovlia Raion on 19 July 2020, the village became part of the Ternopil Raion.

The village was renamed from Hvardiiske to Hnylovody on 19 September 2024.

== Religion ==
- Two churches of the Beheading of St. John the Baptist (1888, wooden, OCU; 1938, brick, converted from a Roman Catholic church in 1991, UGCC).

== Notable residents ==
- Vira Zozulia (born 1970), Ukrainian race walker

== Sources ==
- (in Ukrainian) Бугай Д., Гриник В., Маслянко С., Гвардійське // Ternopil Encyclopedic Dictionary: in 4 v. / editorial board: H. Yavorskyi and other, Ternopil: "Zbruch", 2004, V. 1: А—Й, S. 339—340. — ISBN 966-528-197-6.
- "Gniłowody, pow. podhajecki". Geographical Dictionary of the Kingdom of Poland (in Polish). 2. Warszawa: Kasa im. Józefa Mianowskiego. 1881. p. 639.
