= Vyshenky, Ternopil Oblast =

Rural locality in Ternopil Oblast, Ukraine

Vyshenky Вишеньки
- Location in Ternopil Oblast
- Coordinates: 49°13′40″N 25°26′47″E
- Country: Ukraine
- Oblast: Ternopil Oblast
- Raion: Ternopil Raion
- Hromada: Zolotnyky rural hromada
- Time zone: UTC+2 (EET)
  - Summer (DST): UTC+3 (EEST)
- Postal code: 48142

Vyshenky (Ukrainian: Вишеньки) is a village in Zolotnyky rural hromada, Ternopil Raion, Ternopil Oblast, Ukraine.

== History ==
The first written mention of the village was in 1564.

After the liquidation of the Terebovlia Raion on 19 July 2020, the village became part of the Ternopil Raion.

== Religion ==
- St. Michael church (1997).
