= Pidruda =

Rural locality in Ternopil Oblast, Ukraine

Pidruda Підруда
- Location in Ternopil Oblast
- Coordinates: 49°22′45″N 25°18′40″E
- Country: Ukraine
- Oblast: Ternopil Oblast
- Raion: Ternopil Raion
- Hromada: Zolotnyky rural hromada
- Time zone: UTC+2 (EET)
  - Summer (DST): UTC+3 (EEST)
- Postal code: 48111

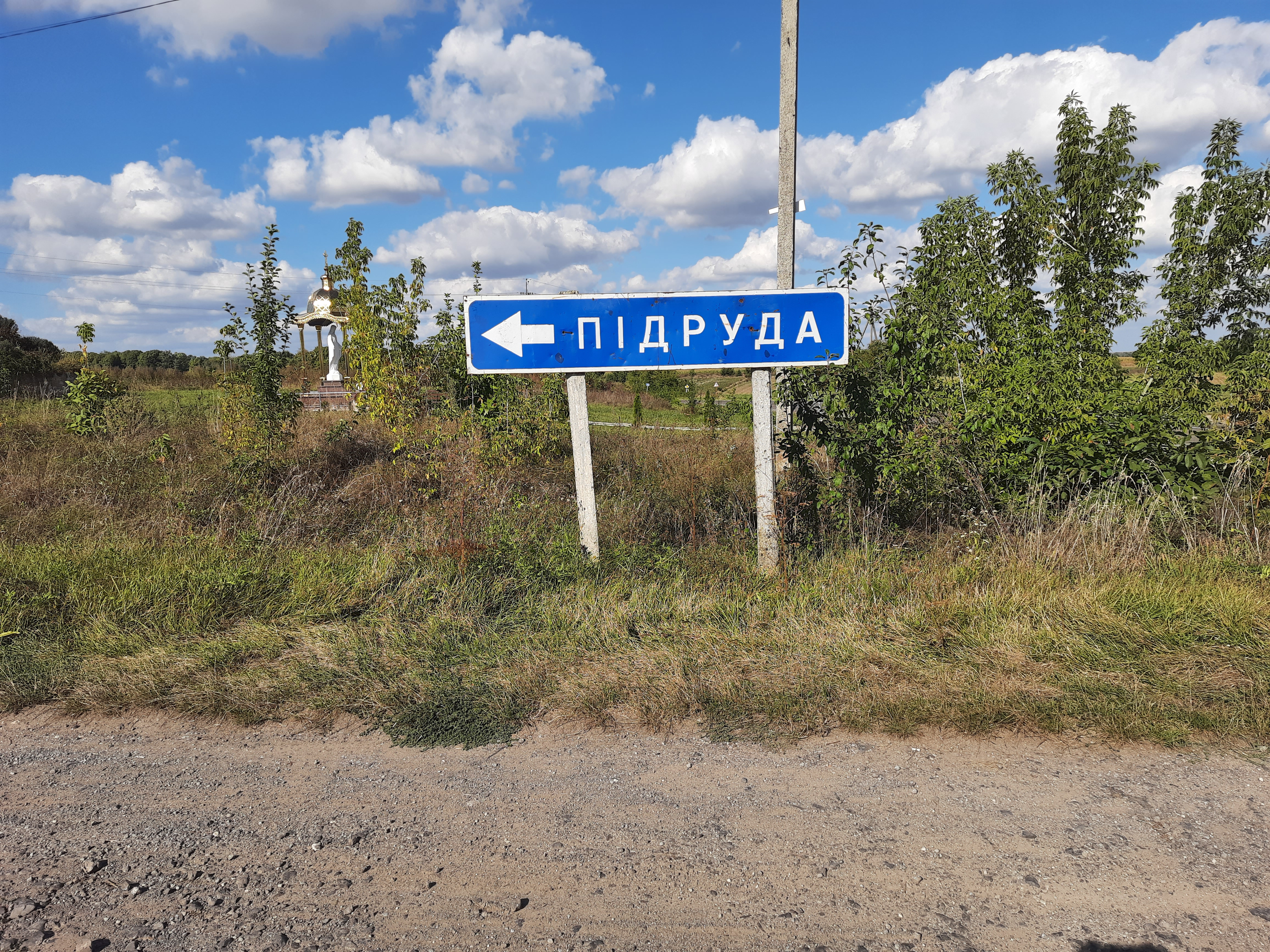
Road sign near the village of Pidruda. Ternopil district, Ternopil region.

Pidruda (Ukrainian: Підруда) is a village in Zolotnyky rural hromada, Ternopil Raion, Ternopil Oblast, Ukraine.

== History ==
The first written mention of the village was in 1675.

After the liquidation of the Terebovlia Raion on 19 July 2020, the village became part of the Ternopil Raion.

== Sources ==
- (in Ukrainian) Лашта В., Підруда // Ternopil Encyclopedic Dictionary: in 4 v. / editorial board: H. Yavorskyi and other, Ternopil: "Zbruch", 2008, V. 3: П—Я, S. 85. — ISBN 978-966-528-279-2.
