= Bahatkivtsi =

Rural locality in Ternopil Oblast, Ukraine

Bahatkivtsi Багатківці
- Location in Ternopil Oblast
- Coordinates: 49°23′32″N 25°22′48″E
- Country: Ukraine
- Oblast: Ternopil Oblast
- Raion: Ternopil Raion
- Hromada: Zolotnyky rural hromada
- Time zone: UTC+2 (EET)
  - Summer (DST): UTC+3 (EEST)
- Postal code: 48110

Bahatkivtsi (Ukrainian: Багатківці) is a village in Zolotnyky rural hromada, Ternopil Raion, Ternopil Oblast, Ukraine.

== History ==
The first written mention of the village was in 1473.

After the liquidation of the Terebovlia Raion on 19 July 2020, the village became part of the Ternopil Raion.

== Religion ==
- St. George church (1929, brick; destroyed during the German-Soviet war, later used as a fertilizer warehouse; rebuilt in 1991).

== Sources ==
- (in Ukrainian) Клименко О., Уніят В., Багатківці // Ternopil Encyclopedic Dictionary: in 4 v. / editorial board: H. Yavorskyi and other, Ternopil: "Zbruch", 2004, V. 1: А—Й, S. 64. — ISBN 966-528-197-6.
- "Bohatkowce". Geographical Dictionary of the Kingdom of Poland (in Polish). 1. Warszawa: Kasa im. Józefa Mianowskiego. 1880. p. 285.
