= Insignia of Saint Olga =

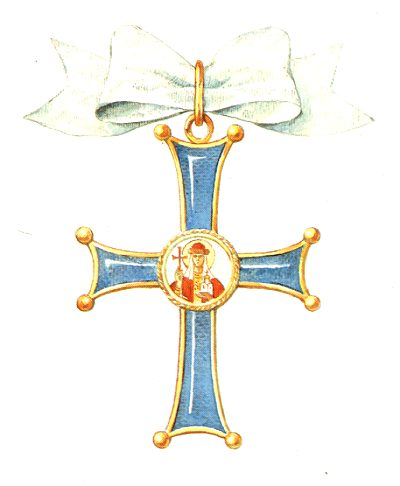
- Badge of the Russian Order of Saint Olga (1916)
- Type: award for distinction
- Awarded for: Public and community service
- Description: gold or silver Byzantine cross with light blue enamel
- Presented by: Russian Empire
- Eligibility: women
- Motto: "For the Benefit of Neighbours"
- Established: 6 March [O.S. 21 February] 1913
- First award: 15 April [O.S. 2 April] 1916
- Final award: 15 April [O.S. 2 April] 1916

Highlights
- Total: 1
- Total recipients: Vera Nikolayevna Panayeva (Вера Николаевна Панаева)
- Ribbon of the insignia

The Insignia of Saint Olga (Russian: Знак отли́чия Свято́й Равноапо́стольной княги́ни О́льги) was an award that briefly existed from 1913 to 1917. It was established on 6 March [O.S. 21 February] 1913 by Emperor Nicholas II of Russia to commemorate the 300th anniversary of the Romanov Dynasty. It was designated as a special award only for females, "in consideration of the merits of women in the various arenas of public and community service, as well as to the deeds and works for the benefit of their neighbours."

The "Insignia of Saint Olga" was only awarded once before the Russian Revolution toppled the monarchy.

== History ==
The creation of the award was announced to coincide with the official anniversary of the Romanov dynasty in 1913; it was later named in honour of Saint Olga (c. 890–969), who was among those who first preached Christianity to the people of Kievan Rus'. It was not officially approved until 11 July 1915.

The award was to have the dates of the Romanov Empire anniversary inscribed, "February, 21st Day, 1613-1913." It was designated for three grades of merit:

- Grade One – A gold and light blue-enamelled Byzantine cross, worn on the left shoulder suspended from a white bow.
- Grade Two – A silver and light blue-enamelled Byzantine cross, worn on the left shoulder suspended from a white bow.
- Grade Three – A smaller plain silver Byzantine cross, worn on the left shoulder suspended from a white bow.

According to the bylines for the award, it was only to be awarded only twice per year: 23 April, the birthday of Empress Alexandra Fyodorovna; and 14 November, the birthday of the Dowager Empress Maria Fyodorovna.

The regulations and bureaucratic delays of implementing the award resulted in it being awarded only one time (Second Class), during World War I. The recipient was Vera Nikolayevna Panayeva (Вера Николаевна Панаева), a Russian widow of Colonel Arkady Aleksandrovich Panayev (1822-1889), who had lost three sons to fighting in the war. She received a lifetime pension of 3000 rubles She died in 1923.

== Designation ==
Though the award has been translated as "The Order of Saint Olga" (Орденом Святой Ольги), it was not given that specific name or designation; being instead officially titled "The Insignia of the Holy Saint Princess Olga" (Знак отличия Святой Равноапостольной Княгини Ольги).

== Related awards ==
Currently, the Moscow Patriarchate awards an Order of Saint Olga, Equal-of-the-Apostles, as a decoration for women. The First Class of this order is awarded only to women who are heads of state. The first woman to be presented with the award in this class was Vaira Vike-Freiberga, the President of Latvia.

Ukraine also established an Order of Princess Olga in 1997.

There was also an Order of Saint Olga and Saint Sophia awarded by the Kingdom of Greece as a Royal House order in four classes:

- Grand Cross – with Riband (sash) and Star
- Second Class – with Bow and Star
- Third Class – with Bow
- Fourth Class – with Bow

== See also ==
- Order of Saint Catherine
- Order of Olga
