= Haivoronka =

Rural locality in Ternopil Oblast, Ukraine

Haivoronka Гайворонка
- Location in Ternopil Oblast
- Coordinates: 49°15′18″N 25°23′7″E
- Country: Ukraine
- Oblast: Ternopil Oblast
- Raion: Ternopil Raion
- Hromada: Zolotnyky rural hromada
- Time zone: UTC+2 (EET)
  - Summer (DST): UTC+3 (EEST)
- Postal code: 48140

Haivoronka (Ukrainian: Гайворонка) is a village in Zolotnyky rural hromada, Ternopil Raion, Ternopil Oblast, Ukraine.

== History ==
The first written mention of the village was in 1776.

After the liquidation of the Terebovlia Raion on 19 July 2020, the village became part of the Ternopil Raion.

== Religion ==
- St. Anne church (1867; restored in 1990, UGCC).

== Sources ==
- (in Ukrainian) , Дорчак О., Уніят В. // Ternopil Encyclopedic Dictionary: in 4 v. / editorial board: H. Yavorskyi and other, Ternopil: "Zbruch", 2004, V. 1: А—Й, S. 322. — ISBN 966-528-197-6.
- "Hajworonka". Geographical Dictionary of the Kingdom of Poland (in Polish). 3. Warszawa: Kasa im. Józefa Mianowskiego. 1882. p. 12.
