= Honcharky =

Rural locality in Ternopil Oblast, Ukraine

Honcharky Гончарки
- Location in Ternopil Oblast
- Coordinates: 49°19′51″N 25°25′5″E
- Country: Ukraine
- Oblast: Ternopil Oblast
- Raion: Ternopil Raion
- Hromada: Zolotnyky rural hromada
- Time zone: UTC+2 (EET)
  - Summer (DST): UTC+3 (EEST)
- Postal code: 48112

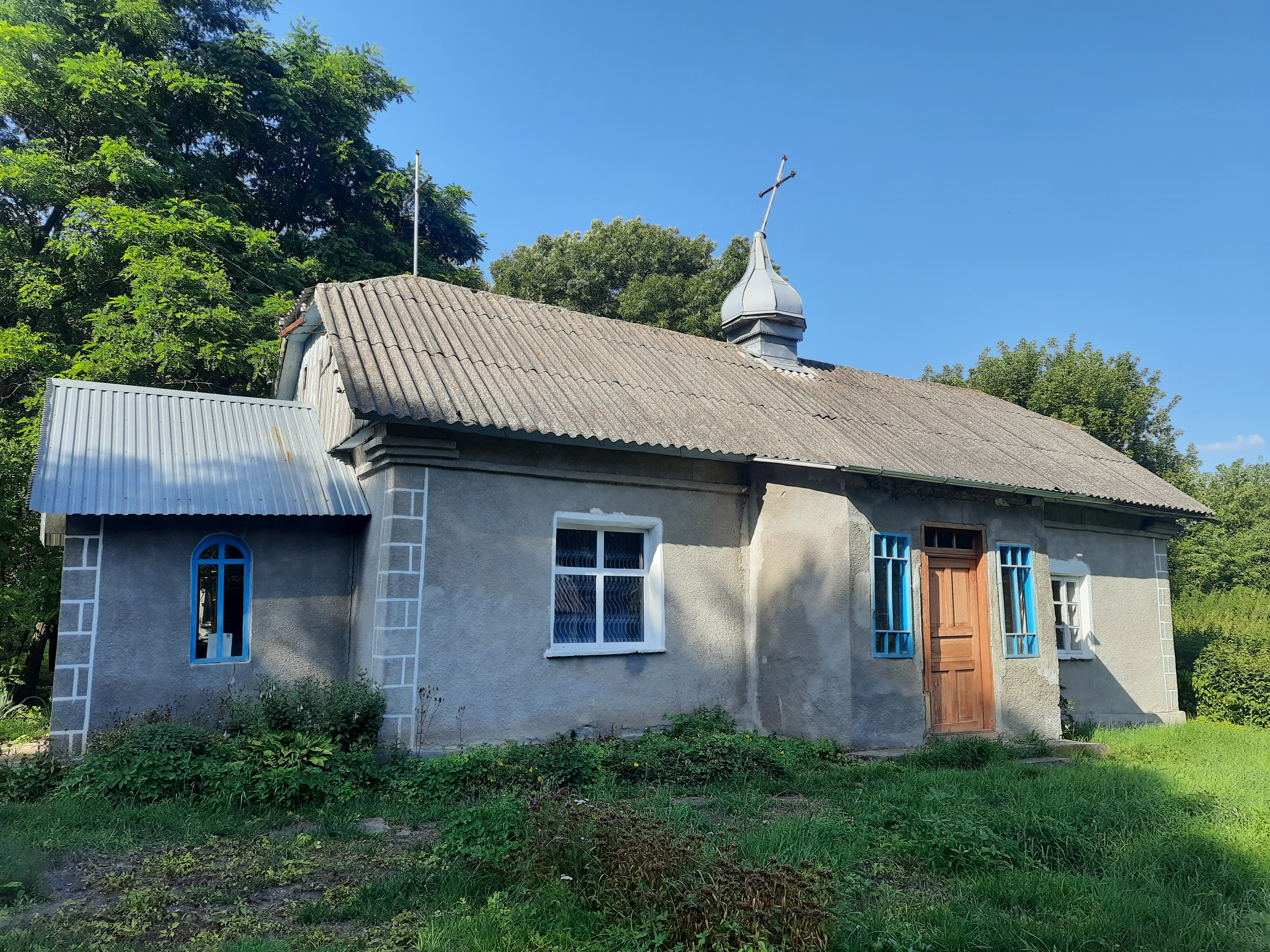
Chapel of the Most Holy Mother of God in the village of Goncharka, Ternopil district, Ternopil region

Honcharky (Ukrainian: Гончарки) is a village in Zolotnyky rural hromada, Ternopil Raion, Ternopil Oblast, Ukraine.

== History ==
The settlement is known from 1472 as a khutir. In the 1950s, it was granted village status.

After the liquidation of the Terebovlia Raion on 19 July 2020, the village became part of the Ternopil Raion.

== Religion ==
From 2007, the chapel has been operating.

== Sources ==
- (in Ukrainian) Шупа A., Гончарки // Ternopil Encyclopedic Dictionary: in 4 v. / editorial board: H. Yavorskyi and other, Ternopil: "Zbruch", 2004, V. 1: А—Й, S. 391. — ISBN 966-528-197-6.
