= Elizabeth Kordyum =

Ukrainian scientist

- Єлизавета Кордюм
- Born: November 3, 1932
- Died: April 27, 2024 (aged 91)
- Scientific career
- Thesis: Сравнитель-ная эмбриология и цитология видов зонтичных в связи с их филогенией и эволюцией [Comparative embryology and cytology of Umbelliferae species in relation to their phylogeny and evolution in English] (1968)

Yelyzaveta Lvivna Kordyum (Ukrainian: Єлизавета Львівна Кордюм; 1932 – 2024) was a Ukrainian scientist known for her work on biology, plant embryology, and space biology.

== Early life and education ==
Kordyum was born on November 3, 1932, in Kyiv. She graduated from high school with honors in 1950, and in 1955 competed her studies at Taras Shevchenko National University of Kyiv.

== Career ==
Kordyum began work at the M. G. Kholodny Institute of Botany of the National Academy of Sciences of Ukraine in 1959, and was a junior research fellow at the Academician O. V. Fomin Botanical Garden of Kyiv University.

Starting in 1976 she was the head of the Department of Cell Biology and Anatomy, a position she held until her death in 2024. She was promoted to professor in 1986. From 1998 to 2003, she worked as deputy director for Scientific Affairs, and in 1998-1999, she was acting director of the M. G. Kholodny Institute of Botany of the National Academy of Sciences of Ukraine . From 2004 to 2024, she was vice-president of the Ukrainian Society of Cell Biology.

== Research ==
Kordyum is known for her work on the impact of gravity on plants, and the adaptation of plants to microgravity. In her research she used electron microscopy to examine how plants sensed gravity.

== Honors and awards ==
In 1979 she received the M.G. Kholodny Prize of the Academy of Sciences of the Ukrainian SSR for her 1979 book Evolutionary cytoembryology of angiosperms. In 1984 she was named an honored scientist of the Ukrainian SSR. She received the Order of Princess Olga award in 1998, 2003, and 2007. In 2020 she was named to the International Astronautical Federation's hall of fame. Kordyum was elected a corresponding member of the National Academy of Sciences of Ukraine, in 2000.

== Selected publications ==
- Kordyum, E.; Baranenko, V.; Nedukha, E.; Samoilov, V. (1997-01-01). "Development of Potato Minitubers in Microgravity". Plant and Cell Physiology. 38 (10): 1111–1117. doi:10.1093/oxfordjournals.pcp.a029095. ISSN 0032-0781.
- Kordyum, Elizabeth L. (1997). "Biology of Plant Cells in Microgravity and under Clinostating". International Review of Cytology. Vol. 171. Elsevier. doi:10.1016/s0074-7696(08)62585-1. ISBN 978-0-12-364575-3.
- Kordyum, E. L.; Chapman, D. K. (2017). "Plants and microgravity: Patterns of microgravity effects at the cellular and molecular levels". Cytology and Genetics. 51 (2): 108–116. doi:10.3103/S0095452717020049. ISSN 0095-4527.
- Kordyum, Elizabeth L.; Shevchenko, Galina V.; Brykov, Vasyl O. (2019). "Cytoskeleton during aerenchyma formation in plants". Cell Biology International. 43 (9): 991–998. doi:10.1002/cbin.10814. ISSN 1065-6995.
- Kordyum, Elizabeth L.; Artemenko, Olga A.; Hasenstein, Karl H. (2022-11-07). "Lipid Rafts and Plant Gravisensitivity". Life. 12 (11): 1809. doi:10.3390/life12111809. ISSN 2075-1729. PMC 9695138. PMID 36362962.
