= Sokilnyky, Ternopil Oblast =

Rural locality in Ternopil Oblast, Ukraine

Sokilnyky Сокільники
- Location in Ternopil Oblast
- Coordinates: 49°18′9″N 25°23′46″E
- Country: Ukraine
- Oblast: Ternopil Oblast
- Raion: Ternopil Raion
- Hromada: Zolotnyky rural hromada
- Time zone: UTC+2 (EET)
  - Summer (DST): UTC+3 (EEST)
- Postal code: 48114

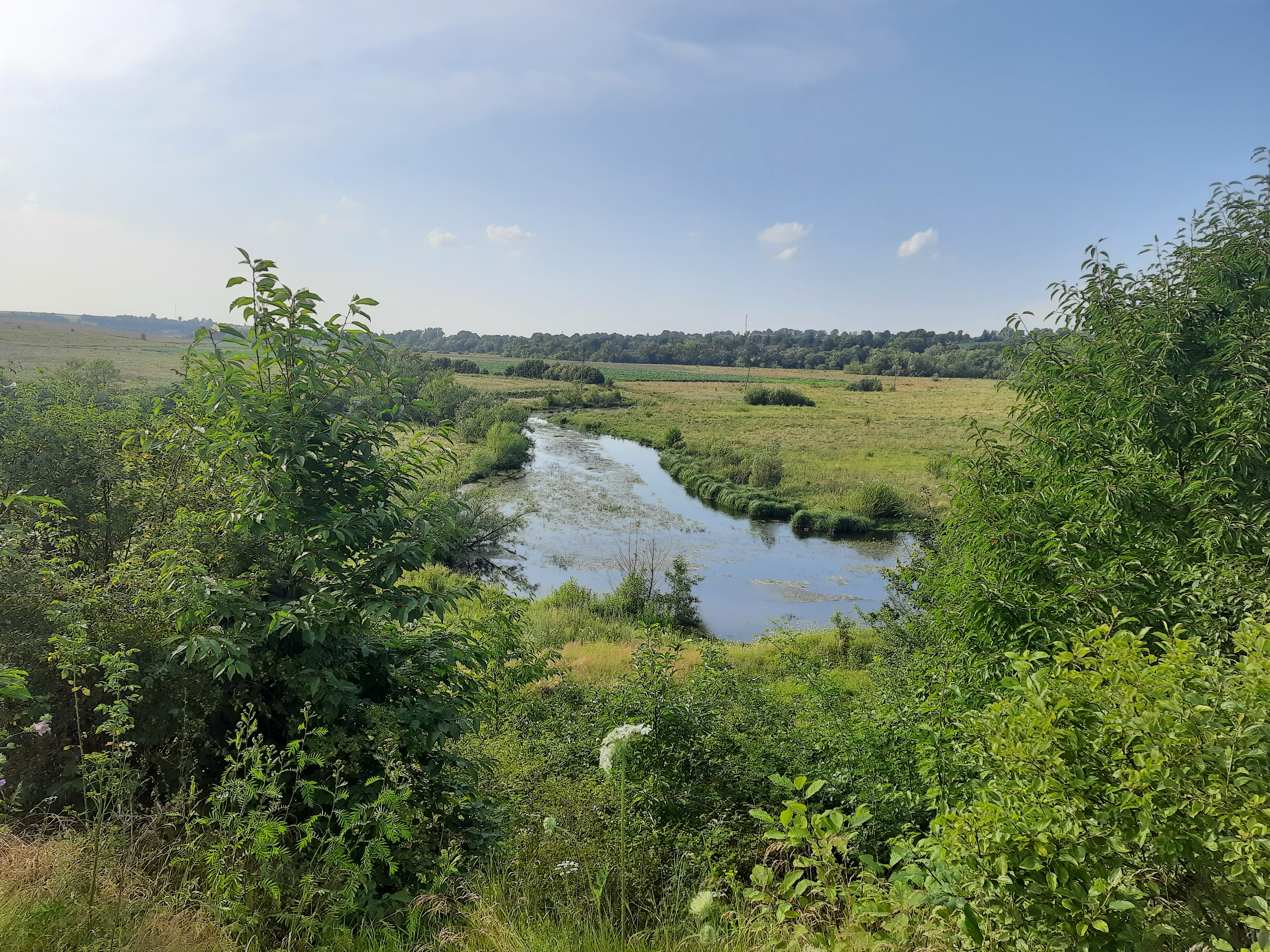

Sokilnyky (Ukrainian: Сокільники) is a village in Zolotnyky rural hromada, Ternopil Raion, Ternopil Oblast, Ukraine.

== History ==
The first written mention of the village was in 1397.

After the liquidation of the Terebovlia Raion on 19 July 2020, the village became part of the Ternopil Raion.

== Sources ==
- (in Ukrainian) Горун М., Івахів Г., Сокільники // Ternopil Oblast. History of cities and villages: in 3 v. / Ternopil: "Terno-graph", 2014, V. 3: М—Ш, S. 322—323. — ISBN 978-966-457-246-7.
- (in Ukrainian) Гуцал П., Хаварівський Б., Сокільники // Ternopil Encyclopedic Dictionary: in 4 v. / editorial board: H. Yavorskyi and other, Ternopil: "Zbruch", 2008, V. 3: П—Я, S. 307. — ISBN 978-966-528-279-2.
- Гуцал П., Півторак С. У краю соколиних злетів: нариси сіл Соколів та Сокільники землі Теребовлянської, Тернопіль: РОМС-К, 1998, 93 s, ISBN 966-7143-02-3.
- "Sokolniki (pow. podhajecki)". Geographical Dictionary of the Kingdom of Poland (in Polish). 11. Warszawa: Kasa im. Józefa Mianowskiego. 1890. p. 23.
