= Burkaniv =

Rural locality in Ternopil Oblast, Ukraine

Burkaniv Бурканів
- Location in Ternopil Oblast
- Coordinates: 49°16′45″N 25°21′41″E
- Country: Ukraine
- Oblast: Ternopil Oblast
- Raion: Ternopil Raion
- Hromada: Zolotnyky rural hromada
- Time zone: UTC+2 (EET)
  - Summer (DST): UTC+3 (EEST)
- Postal code: 48116

Burkaniv (Ukrainian: Бурканів Polish: Burkanów) is a village in Zolotnyky rural hromada, Ternopil Raion, Ternopil Oblast, Ukraine.

== History ==
The first written mention of the village was in 1564.

After the liquidation of the Terebovlia Raion on 19 July 2020, the village became part of the Ternopil Raion.

== Religion ==
- Two churches of the Transfiguration (1991, OCU; 1995, UGCC, built on the site of an old church destroyed in 1958).

== Sources ==
- (in Ukrainian) Бігус М., Томашук П., Уніят В., Бурканів // Ternopil Encyclopedic Dictionary: in 4 v. / editorial board: H. Yavorskyi and other, Ternopil: "Zbruch", 2004, V. 1: А—Й, S. 201. — ISBN 966-528-197-6.
- "Burkanów". Geographical Dictionary of the Kingdom of Poland (in Polish). 1. Warszawa: Kasa im. Józefa Mianowskiego. 1880. p. 474.
