= Sokoliv, Ternopil Raion, Ternopil Oblast =

Rural locality in Ternopil Oblast, Ukraine

Sokoliv Соколів
- Location in Ternopil Oblast
- Coordinates: 49°18′32″N 25°22′54″E
- Country: Ukraine
- Oblast: Ternopil Oblast
- Raion: Ternopil Raion
- Hromada: Zolotnyky rural hromada
- Time zone: UTC+2 (EET)
  - Summer (DST): UTC+3 (EEST)
- Postal code: 48114

Sokoliv (Ukrainian: Соколів) is a village in Zolotnyky rural hromada, Ternopil Raion, Ternopil Oblast, Ukraine.

== History ==
The first written mention of the village was in 1487.

After the liquidation of the Terebovlia Raion on 19 July 2020, the village became part of the Ternopil Raion.

== Religion ==
- St. Paraskeva church (1936, brick, restored in 2012).

== Sources ==
- (in Ukrainian) Гуцал П., Рогальський В., Соколів // Ternopil Encyclopedic Dictionary: in 4 v. / editorial board: H. Yavorskyi and other, Ternopil: "Zbruch", 2008, V. 3: П—Я, S. 308. — ISBN 978-966-528-279-2.
- "Sokołów (5)". Geographical Dictionary of the Kingdom of Poland (in Polish). 11. Warszawa: Kasa im. Józefa Mianowskiego. 1890. p. 33.
