= Nadrichne, Zolotnyky rural hromada, Ternopil Raion, Ternopil Oblast =

Nadrichne Надрічне
- Village
- Location within Ternopil Oblast
- Coordinates: 49°18′54″N 25°21′57″E
- Country: Ukraine
- Oblast: Ternopil Oblast
- District: Ternopil Raion
- Hromada: Zolotnyky rural hromada
- Established: 1785

Area
  - Total: 2.783 km^{2} (1.075 sq mi)
- Elevation: 319 m (1,047 ft)

Population (2001)
  - Total: 509
- Time zone: UTC+2 (EET)
  - Summer (DST): UTC+3 (EEST)
- Postal code: 48114
- Area code: +380 3551

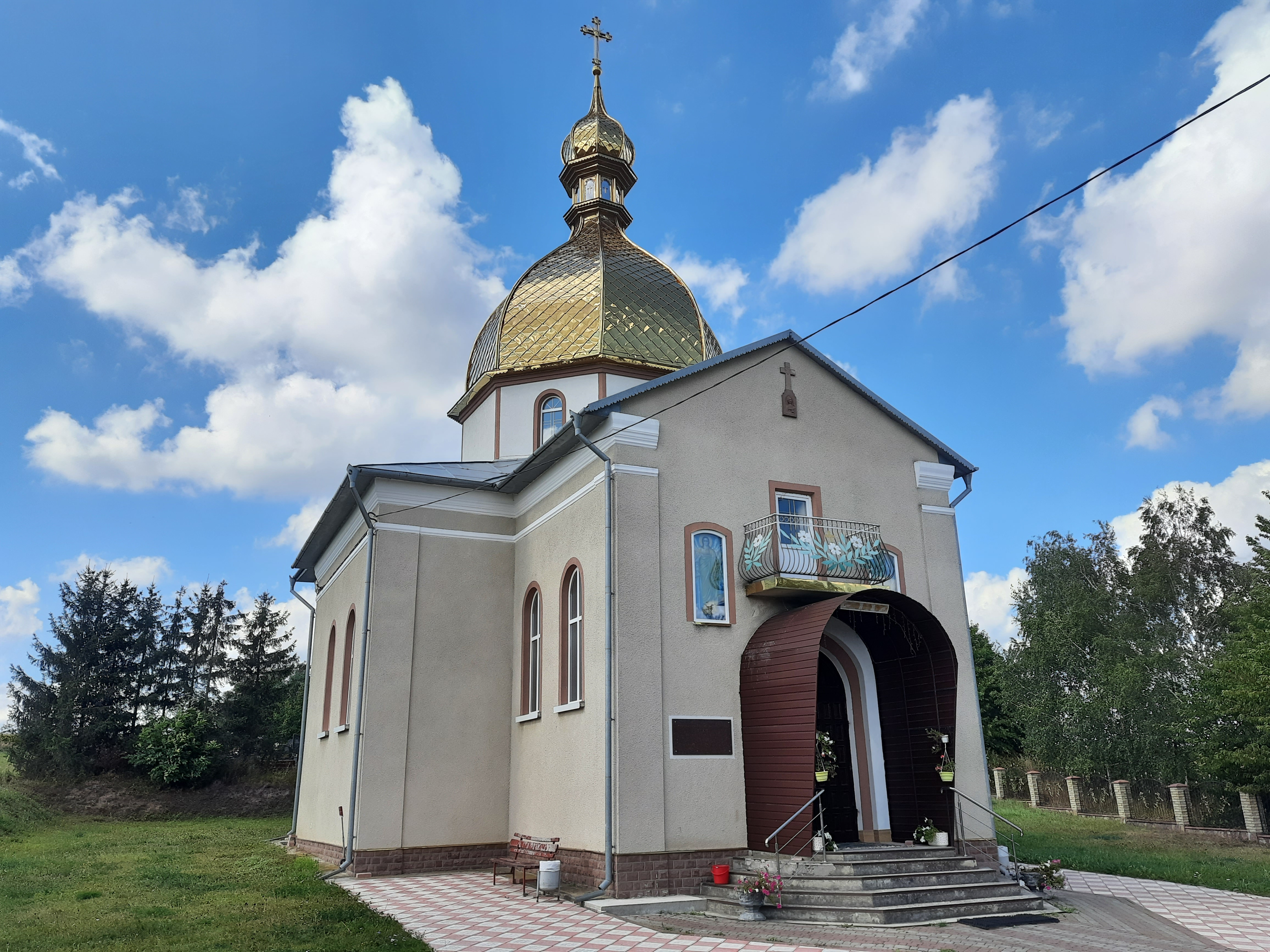
Church of the Assumption of the Blessed Virgin Mary (2008) Nadrichne (Zolotnyk village community) Ternopil district, Ternopil region.

Nadrichne (Ukrainian: Надрічне) is a village in Ternopil Raion of Ternopil Oblast. It belongs to Zolotnyky rural hromada, one of the hromadas of Ukraine.

Until 18 July 2020, Nadrichne belonged to Terebovlia Raion. The raion was abolished in July 2020 as part of the administrative reform of Ukraine, which reduced the number of raions of Ternopil Oblast to three. The area of Terebovlia Raion was merged into Ternopil Raion.
