= Zolotnyky =

Zolotnyky Золотники
- Location in Ternopil Oblast
- Coordinates: 49°17′18″N 25°23′01″E
- Country: Ukraine
- Oblast: Ternopil Oblast
- Raion: Ternopil Raion
- Hromada: Zolotnyky Hromada
- Postal code: 48115

Zolotnyky (Ukrainian: Золотники) is a village in Zolotnyky rural hromada, Ternopil Raion, Ternopil Oblast, Ukraine.

== History ==
The first written mention of the village dates back to 1410.

After the liquidation of the Terebovlia Raion on 19 July 2020, the village became part of the Ternopil Raion.

== Religion ==
- Saint Luke church (1890, brick, UGCC)
