= Vira Zozulya =

Ukrainian racewalker

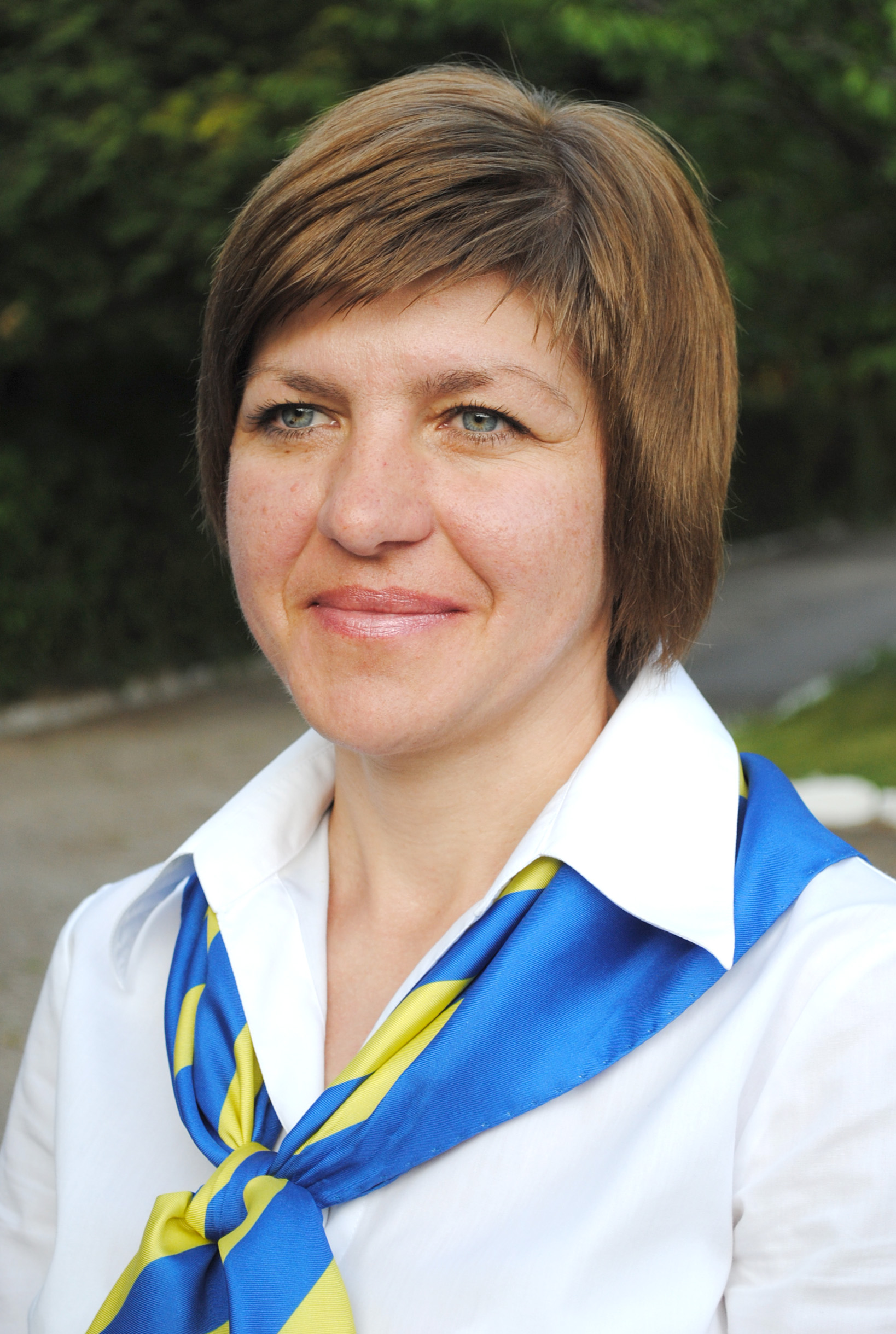

Personal information
- Born: 31 August 1970 (age 56) Hvardiiske, Ternopil Oblast, Soviet Union

Sport
- Sport: Race walking

Vira Mykhaliïvna Zozulya (Ukrainian: Віра Михаліївна Зозуля; born 31 August 1970) is a Ukrainian race walker, who competed in three consecutive Summer Olympics for her native country, starting in 2000.

== Achievements ==
| Year | Competition | Venue | Position | Event | Notes |
Representing Ukraine
| 1997 | World Race Walking Cup | Poděbrady, Czech Republic | 36th | 10 km | 45:07 |
| 2000 | European Race Walking Cup | Eisenhüttenstadt, Germany | 15th | 20 km | 1:31:40 |
| 2000 | Olympic Games | Sydney, Australia | 24th | 20 km | 1:35:43 |
| 2001 | European Race Walking Cup | Dudince, Slovakia | 20th | 20 km | 1:34:24 |
| 2001 | World Championships | Edmonton, Canada | 15th | 20 km | 1:35:32 |
| 2002 | World Race Walking Cup | Turin, Italy | 33rd | 20 km | 1:36:42 |
| 2003 | World Championships | Paris, France | 17th | 20 km | 1:33:34 |
| 2004 | World Race Walking Cup | Naumburg, Germany | 22nd | 20 km | 1:30:33 |
| 2004 | Olympic Games | Athens, Greece | 42nd | 20 km | 1:38:45 |
| 2005 | World Championships | Helsinki, Finland | 26th | 20 km | 1:35:12 |
| 2006 | World Race Walking Cup | A Coruña, Spain | 30th | 20 km | 1:35:33 |
| 2008 | World Race Walking Cup | Cheboksary, Russia | 16th | 20 km | 1:31:12 |
| 2008 | Olympic Games | Beijing, China | 16th | 20 km | 1:30:31 |
| 2009 | European Race Walking Cup | Metz, France | 26th | 20 km | 1:44:47 |
