= Zolotnyky rural hromada =

Rural hromada in Ternopil Oblast, Ukraine

Zolotnyky rural hromada Золотниківська сільська громада
- hromada
- Location within Ternopil Oblast Location within Ukraine
- Coordinates: 49°17′18″N 25°23′1″E
- Country: Ukraine
- Oblast: Ternopil Oblast
- Raion: Ternopil Raion
- Administrative center: Zolotnyky

Government
  - Hromada head: Danylo Buhai

Area
  - Total: 286.8 km^{2} (110.7 sq mi)

Population (2022)
  - Total: 7,498
- Villages: 21
- Website: zolotnykivska-gromada.gov.ua

Zolotnyky rural territorial hromada (Ukrainian: Золотниківська територіальна громада, romanized: Zolotnykivska silska terytorialna hromada) is a hromada in Ukraine, in Ternopil Raion of Ternopil Oblast. The administrative center is the village of Zolotnyky. Its population is 7,498 (2022 estimate) Established on 23 July 2015.

== Settlements ==
The hromada consists of 21 villages:

- Bahatkivtsi
- Beneva
- Burkaniv
- Vyshenky
- Vyshnivchyk
- Haivoronka
- Hnylovody
- Honcharky
- Zarvanytsia
- Zolotnyky
- Kotuziv
- Malovody
- Nadrichne
- Pantalykha
- Pidruda
- Rakovets
- Sapova
- Semykivtsi
- Sokilnyky
- Sokoliv
- Sosniv
