= Kotuziv =

Rural locality in Ternopil Oblast, Ukraine

Kotuziv Котузів
- Location in Ternopil Oblast
- Coordinates: 49°14′11″N 25°18′50″E
- Country: Ukraine
- Oblast: Ternopil Oblast
- Raion: Ternopil Raion
- Hromada: Zolotnyky rural hromada
- Time zone: UTC+2 (EET)
  - Summer (DST): UTC+3 (EEST)
- Postal code: 48141

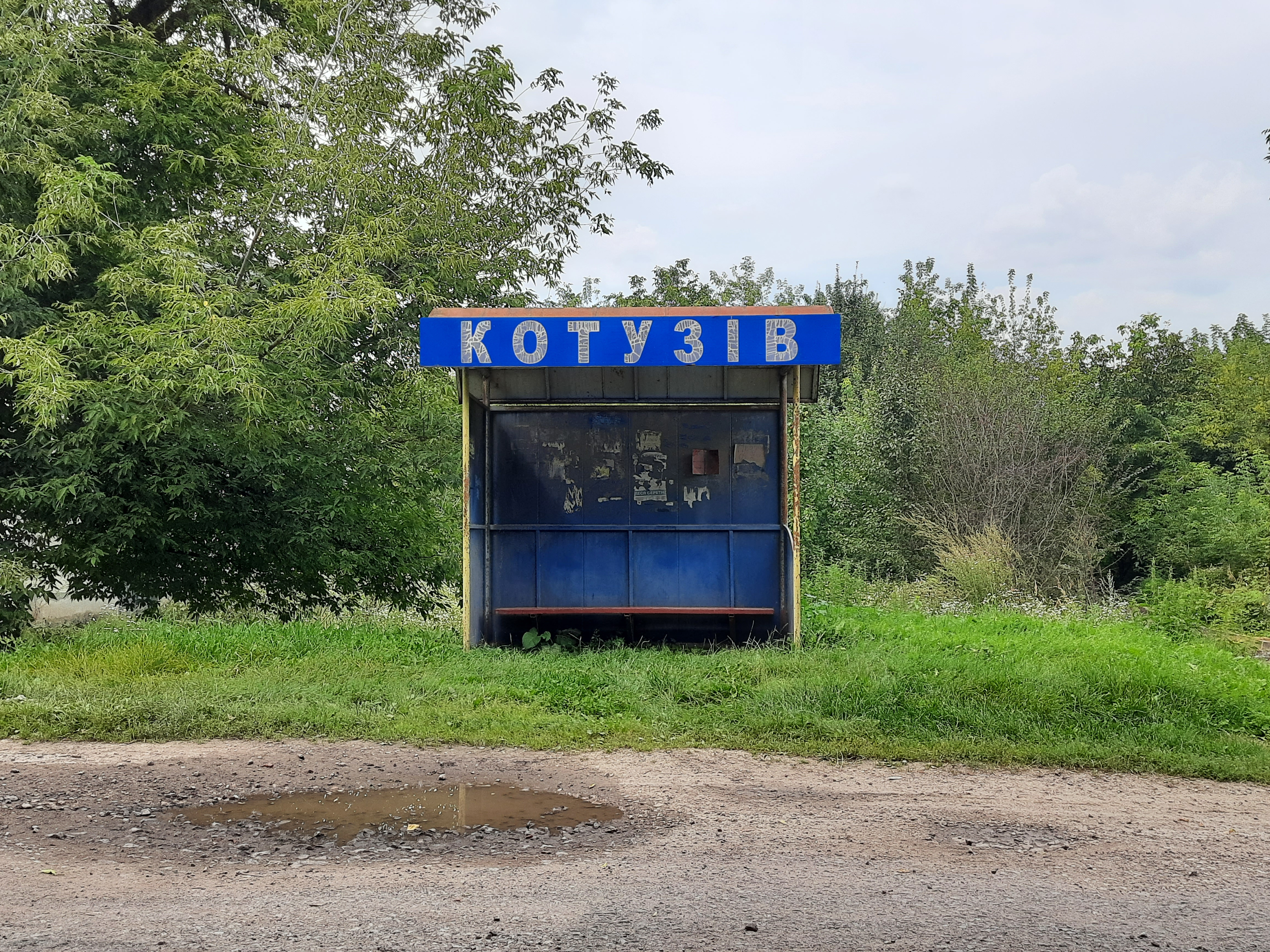
Bus stop village Kotuziv Ternopil district, Ternopil region

Kotuziv (Ukrainian: Котузів) is a village in Zolotnyky rural hromada, Ternopil Raion, Ternopil Oblast, Ukraine.

== History ==
The first written mention of the village was in 1581.

After the liquidation of the Terebovlia Raion on 19 July 2020, the village became part of the Ternopil Raion.

== Religion ==
- Two churches of St. Nicholas (1989, 1992, UGCC).

== Sources ==
- (in Ukrainian) Динька О., Уніят В., Котузів // Ternopil Encyclopedic Dictionary: in 4 v. / editorial board: H. Yavorskyi and other, Ternopil: "Zbruch", 2005, V. 2: К—О, S. 203. — ISBN 966-528-199-2.
