= Order of Princess Olga =

Civil decoration of Ukraine

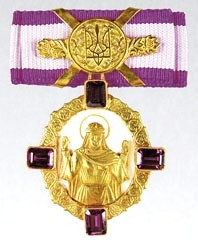
- Badge of the First Class of the Order of Princess Olga
- Type: Three-grades order
- Awarded for: Personal merits of women in state, scientific, educational, cultural and other social areas
- Presented by: Ukraine
- Status: Active
- Established: 15 August 1997
- First award: 18 August 1997 (3rd Class)
- Ribbon bar of the First Class of the Order of Princess Olga

Precedence
- Next (higher): Order For Courage
- Next (lower): Order of Danylo Halytsky

The Order of Princess Olga (Ukrainian: Орден княгині Ольги, romanized: Orden kniahyni Olhy) is a Ukrainian civil decoration featuring Olga, a 9th-century regent of Kievan Rus'. It is bestowed to women for "personal merits in state, production, scientific, educational, cultural, charity and other spheres of social activities, for upbringing children in families". It was established by Presidential Decree No. 827/97 of 15 August 1997 and has three grades (classes), the first being the highest. The 1st grade medal is adorned with four rectangular amethysts and features a gilded ornament with silver parts. The two other grades also feature precious stones.

Both Ukrainian citizens and foreigners are eligible for the order. The order can be rescinded by the President of Ukraine if a bearer is convicted of a serious crime.

In 2020, the Orthodox Church of Ukraine established own "Order of Saint Equal-to-Apostle Princess Olga".

== Selected recipients ==
- Tetiana Andriienko (1938–2016), Ukrainian botanist, conservationist, and professor.
- Anne Applebaum (b. 1964), Polish-American historian and journalist
- Marieluise Beck (b. 1952), German politician, member of the Bundestag from the Alliance '90/The Greens
- Jana Černochová (b. 1973), Czech Minister of Defence
- Catherine Colonna (b. 1956), French Minister of Europe and Foreign Affairs
- Laura Cooper (b. 1974), US Deputy Assistant Secretary of Defense for Russian, Ukrainian, and Eurasian affairs
- Mette Frederiksen (b. 1977), Prime Minister of Denmark (since 2019)
- Myroslava Gongadze (b. 1972), Ukrainian journalist living in the United States
- Rebecca Harms (b. 1956), German Member of the European Parliament
- Hanna Havrylets (1958–2022), Ukrainian composer
- Anne Hidalgo (b. 1959), French politician, Mayor of Paris (2014–2026)
- Agnieszka Holland (b. 1948), Polish filmmaker
- Kaja Kallas (b. 1977), Prime Minister of Estonia (2021–2024) and EU High Representative for Foreign Affairs and Security Policy (since 2024)
- Olha Kharlan (b. 1990), four-time world champion sabre fencer.
- Elizabeth Kordyum (1923–2024), Ukrainian scientist
- Olena Kostevych (b. 1985), Ukrainian pistol shooter
- Larysa Krushelnytska (1928–2017), Ukrainian archaeologist
- Raisa Kyrychenko (1943–2005), Ukrainian singer
- Yaroslava Mahuchikh (b. 2001), Ukrainian athlete, world record holder of women's high jump.
- Sanna Marin (b. 1985), Prime Minister of Finland (2019–2023)
- Oksana Markarova (b. 1976), Ambassador of Ukraine to the United States
- Roberta Metsola (b. 1979), President of the European Parliament
- Mariya Orlyk (1930–2022), Ukrainian teacher and politician.
- Atena Pashko (1931–2012), Ukrainian chemical engineer, poet, social activist
- Nancy Pelosi (b. 1940), 52nd Speaker of the US House of Representatives
- Vera Rich (1936–2009), British poet and translator
- Olha Saladukha (b. 1983), Ukrainian triple jumper
- Heidemarie Stefanyshyn-Piper (b. 1963), American astronaut of Ukrainian descent
- Khrystyna Stuy (b. 1988), Ukrainian sprint athlete
- Tatiana Tairova-Yakovleva (b. 1967), Russian-born historian of Cossack Ukraine
- Melania Trump (b. 1970), First Lady of the United States
- Melanne Verveer (b. 1944), United States Ambassador-at-Large for Global Women's Issues
- Oksana Zabuzhko (b. 1960), Ukrainian novelist

== Medals and ribbons ==
First Class	Second Class	Third Class
Ribbon

== See also ==
- Insignia of Saint Olga
