= Semykivtsi =

Rural locality in Ternopil Oblast, Ukraine

Semykivtsi Семиківці
- Location in Ternopil Oblast
- Coordinates: 49°22′33″N 25°22′22″E
- Country: Ukraine
- Oblast: Ternopil Oblast
- Raion: Ternopil Raion
- Hromada: Zolotnyky rural hromada
- Time zone: UTC+2 (EET)
  - Summer (DST): UTC+3 (EEST)
- Postal code: 48111

Semykivtsi (Ukrainian: Семиківці) is a village in Zolotnyky rural hromada, Ternopil Raion, Ternopil Oblast, Ukraine.

== History ==
The first written mention of the village was in 1468.

After the liquidation of the Terebovlia Raion on 19 July 2020, the village became part of the Ternopil Raion.

== Religion ==
- St. Demetrius church (1926, UGCC, rebuilt from a Roman Catholic church).

== Sources ==
- (in Ukrainian) Мельничук Б., Хаварівський Б., Семиківці // Ternopil Encyclopedic Dictionary: in 4 v. / editorial board: H. Yavorskyi and other, Ternopil: "Zbruch", 2008, V. 3: П—Я, S. 242. — ISBN 978-966-528-279-2.
- "Siemikowce 1.) ws, pow. podhajecki". Geographical Dictionary of the Kingdom of Poland (in Polish). 10. Warszawa: Kasa im. Józefa Mianowskiego. 1889. p. 548.
