= History of the Jews in Ukraine =

Ukrainian Jews יַהֲדוּת אוּקְרָאִינָה Українські євреї
- The location of Ukraine in Europe

Total population
- 2021 est. 43,000 core – 140,000 enlarged 45,000 by 2023 est.

Languages
- Russian (83.0%), Ukrainian (13.4%), Yiddish (3.1%), Hebrew

Religion
- Judaism, Christianity and other (including atheism)

Related ethnic groups
- Jews, Ashkenazi Jews, Russian Jews, Mountain Jews, Belarusian Jews, Romanian Jews, Hungarian Jews, Polish Jews

The history of the Jews in Ukraine dates back over a thousand years; Jewish communities have existed in the modern territory of Ukraine from the time of the Kievan Rus' (late 9th to mid-13th century). Important Jewish religious and cultural movements, from Hasidism to Zionism, arose there. According to the World Jewish Congress, the Jewish community in Ukraine is Europe's fourth largest and the world's 11th largest.

The presence of Jews in Ukrainian territory is first mentioned in the 10th century. At times Jewish life in Ukrainian lands flourished, while at other times it faced persecution and antisemitic discrimination. During the Khmelnytsky uprising between 1648 and 1657, an army of Cossacks massacred and took large numbers of Jews, Roman Catholics, and Uniate Christians into captivity. One estimate (1996) reported that 15,000–30,000 Jews were killed or taken captive, and that 300 Jewish communities were completely destroyed. More recent estimates (2014) report mortality of 3,000–6,000 people between the years 1648–1649. As a result of the massacres, by the 18th century virtually no Jewish population remained in Cossack-governed Ukrainian lands to the east of the Dnieper, although some were able to survive and integrate into the local society by converting to Orthodox Christianity. Many Jews fled to Polish-ruled areas to the west, but in those areas they also suffered from regular persecutions and attacks leading to thousands of deaths.

Following the Partitions of Poland, most of Ukrainian lands ended up part of the Russian Empire, which introduced various limitations against the local Jewish inhabitants and tied them to the so-called Pale of Settlement. During 1821 anti-Jewish riots in Odesa, caused by the death of the Greek Orthodox Patriarch in Constantinople, 14 Jews were recorded killed. Some sources claim this episode as the first pogrom. During the second half of the 19th and into the early 20th century, anti-Jewish pogroms continued, leading to large-scale emigration. In 1915, the imperial Russian government expelled thousands of Jews from the Empire's border areas, including parts of Ukraine. In comparison to Russian-ruled areas, Jews living in Austrian-ruled Galicia and other parts of modern-day Western Ukraine were more tolerated, but many of them still suffered from severe poverty, which led to mass emigration.

In the Ukrainian People's Republic (1917–1920), Yiddish became a state language, along with Ukrainian and Russian. At that time, the Jewish National Union was created and the community was granted autonomous status. Yiddish was used on Ukrainian currency between 1917 and 1920. Nevertheless, between 1918 and 1920 in the period after the Russian Revolution and ensuing Ukrainian War of Independence, an estimated 31,071 but possibly up to 100,000 Jews were killed in pogroms perpetrated by a variety of warring factions, one of which was the army of the Ukrainian People's Republic, formally under the command of Symon Petliura. Pogroms erupted in January 1919 in the northwest province of Volhynia and spread to many other regions, continuing until 1921. The actions of the Soviet government by 1927 led to a growing antisemitism.

Before World War II, slightly less than one-third of Ukraine's urban population consisted of Jews. Total civilian losses in Ukraine during World War II and the German occupation are estimated at seven million. More than one million Soviet Jews, including 225,000 in Belarus, were killed by the Einsatzgruppen and their many Ukrainian supporters. Most of them were killed in Ukraine because most pre-WWII Soviet Jews lived in the Pale of Settlement, of which Ukraine was the biggest part. The major massacres against Jews occurred mainly in the first phase of the occupation, although they continued until the return of the Red Army.

In 1959 Ukraine had 840,000 Jews, a decrease of almost 70% from 1941 totals (within Ukraine's current borders). Ukraine's Jewish population continued to decline significantly during the Cold War. In 1989, Ukraine's Jewish population was only slightly more than half of what it was in 1959. During and after the collapse of communism in the 1990s, the majority of Jews left the country and moved abroad (mostly to Israel). Antisemitism, including violent attacks on Jews, was still a problem in Ukraine in 2012, according to UN report. The country's current president, Volodymyr Zelenskyy, is Jewish.

== Name ==
In modern Ukrainian language the accepted term for Jews is євреї (yevreyi), but other terms to denote the community have also been used. The word zhyd (жид) was historically the standard word for Jews used by the Ukrainian population, but it gradually started to be perceived as pejorative and went out of use under the influence of Russian language.

== Medieval and Early Modern era ==
=== Early settlement ===
Jews are considered to be the oldest national and religious minority in Ukraine. Hellenized Jews appeared in Crimea and on the Black Sea coast already in pre-Christian times, and Hebrew inscriptions dating to the 2nd century AD have been preserved in those areas. Several inscriptions from Panticapaeum, dating to the 1st and 2nd centuries AD, mention the local synagogue (sometimes described as belonging jointly to Jews and "God-fearers") as the supervising body for the manumission of freedom slaves. A similar practice is attested across the Kerch Strait, in the synagogue of Phanagoria. A third-century Hebrew funerary inscription for an individual named Isaac was discovered in Panticapaeum; it includes a blessing for peace, which was cited by archaeologist Anna Collar as evidence of a broad resurgence in the use of the Hebrew language among the Jewish diaspora. From this same period, examples of menorah imagery appear alongside Hebrew names such as Seimon and Samouelos.

The ruling elites of Turkic Khazar Khaganate, which based its territory on the Volga and Don rivers, adopted Judaism as their religion around 740. However, in 964 that state was defeated by Sviatoslav, Grand Prince of Kiev, and soon ceased its existence.

=== Kyivan Rus ===
Khazar signature from the letter written by members of the Kyiv Jewish community, 10th century

The presence of a Jewish community in the territory of modern-day Ukraine is first mentioned in the Kievan Letter, which was composed in the 10th century and became the first written mention of the Ukrainian capital. The document is especially valuable because it mentions the names of members of the city's Jewish community, which aside from the majority Semitic names, also has names that are apparently Slavic, while others appear to be of Turkic origin. According to a chronicle, in 987 Khazarian Jews were reported to visit prince Volodymyr of Kyiv, attempting him to convert to Judaism. Anti-Jewish polemics are present in the writings of Kyiv metropolitan Hilarion.

By the 11th century, Byzantine Jews of Constantinople had familial, cultural, and theological ties with the Jews of Kyiv. For instance, some 11th-century Jews from Kievan Rus participated in an anti-Karaite assembly held in either Thessaloniki or Constantinople. One of the three Kyivan city gates in the times of Yaroslav the Wise was called Zhydovski (Jewish), and under 1124 a separate Jewish quarter in Kyiv known as Zhydove ("Jews") was mentioned.

Kyivan Jews engaged in trade and financial operations, and would be hired by princes to perform central administrative tasks, enjoying their protection. Popular dissatisfaction with the influence of Jewish financiers was claimed by chronicles to be one of the causes of a popular uprising, which engulfed Kyiv in 1113 after the death of prince Sviatopolk Iziaslavich. The rebels plundered the houses of Kyiv's Jews, who were accused by them of usury.

In Galicia, Jews were mentioned for the first time in 1030. There are mentions of cooperation between Daniel of Galicia and the Jewish population in his realm, and a chronicle reported that the death of prince Volodymyr Vasylkovych in 1288 was greatly mourned by his Jewish subjects.

=== Polish-Lithuanian rule ===
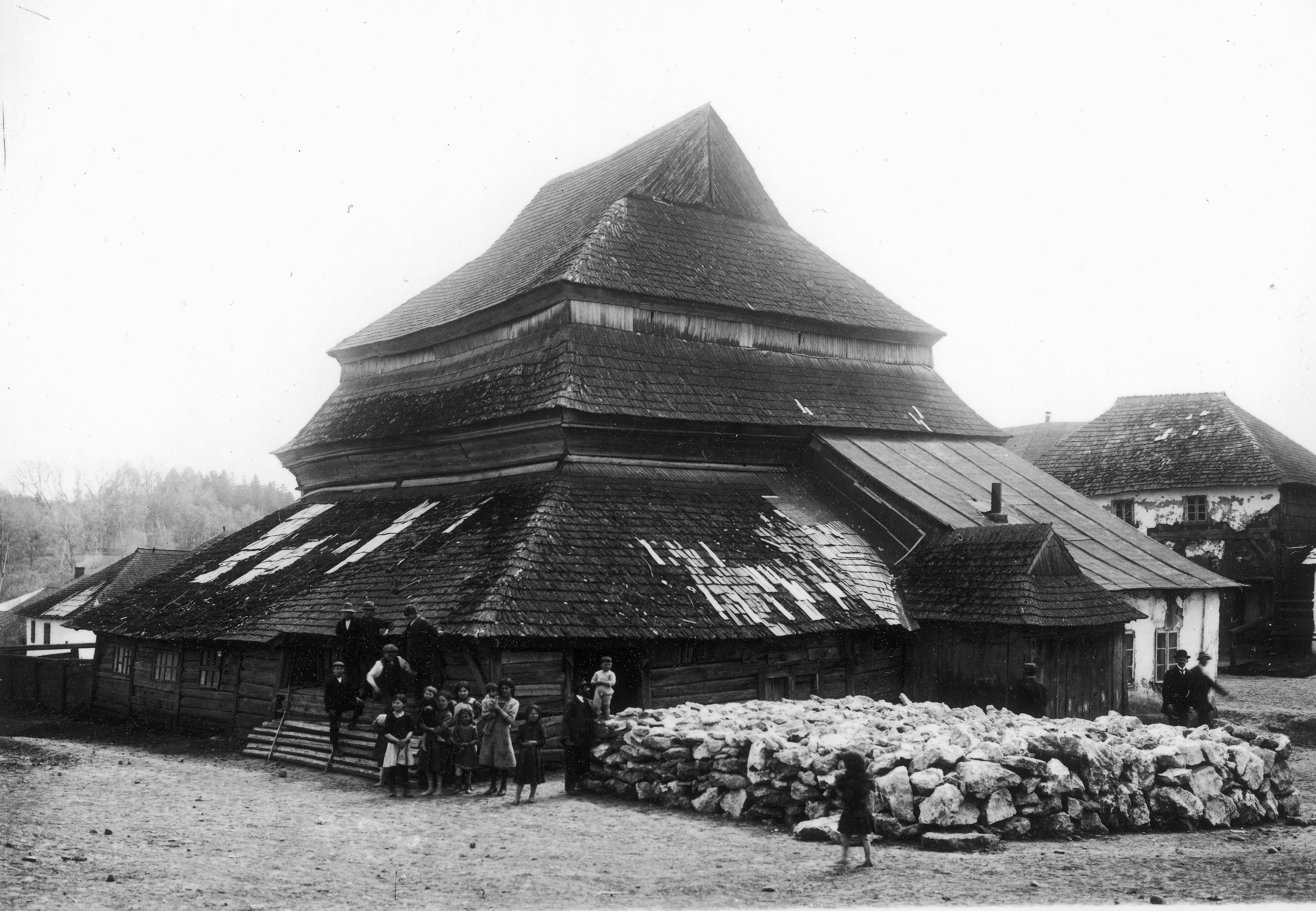
17th-century wooden synagogue in Gwozdziec (now Hvizdets, Ukraine), which was lost during WW2

From the second part of the 14th century, Galician Jews became subjects of Polish kings and magnates. Meanwhile Volhynia, Kyiv and Podolia were incorporated by the Grand Duchy of Lithuania, and local Jews received equal rights with their Lithuanian counterparts. Starting from the late 14th century, active Jewish settlement from Poland and Germany started, and Jewish communities were established in Lutsk, Berestia and other cities. Jewish presence in Galicia was regulated by the 1334 Statute of Kalisz issued by Casimir the Great.

During the late 15th century the biggest wave of Jewish migration to Poland and Lithuania took place following the expulsion of Jews by Holy Roman Emperor Maximilian I. Most Jews migrating to Ukraine during that time were speakers of Yiddish. They were required to wear distinct clothing, and settled in separate urban quarters (ghettos). In 1495 Lithuanian duke Alexander ordered the expulsion of Jews from his realm, but after his election as King of Poland allowed them to return. In 1507 Sigismund I confirmed the rights of Jews in the Grand Duchy of Lithuania, and in 1529 those rights were included into the First Statute of Lithuania. The second statute in 1566 introduced several limitations against Jews, but those were removed after the adoption of the Third Statute of 1589.

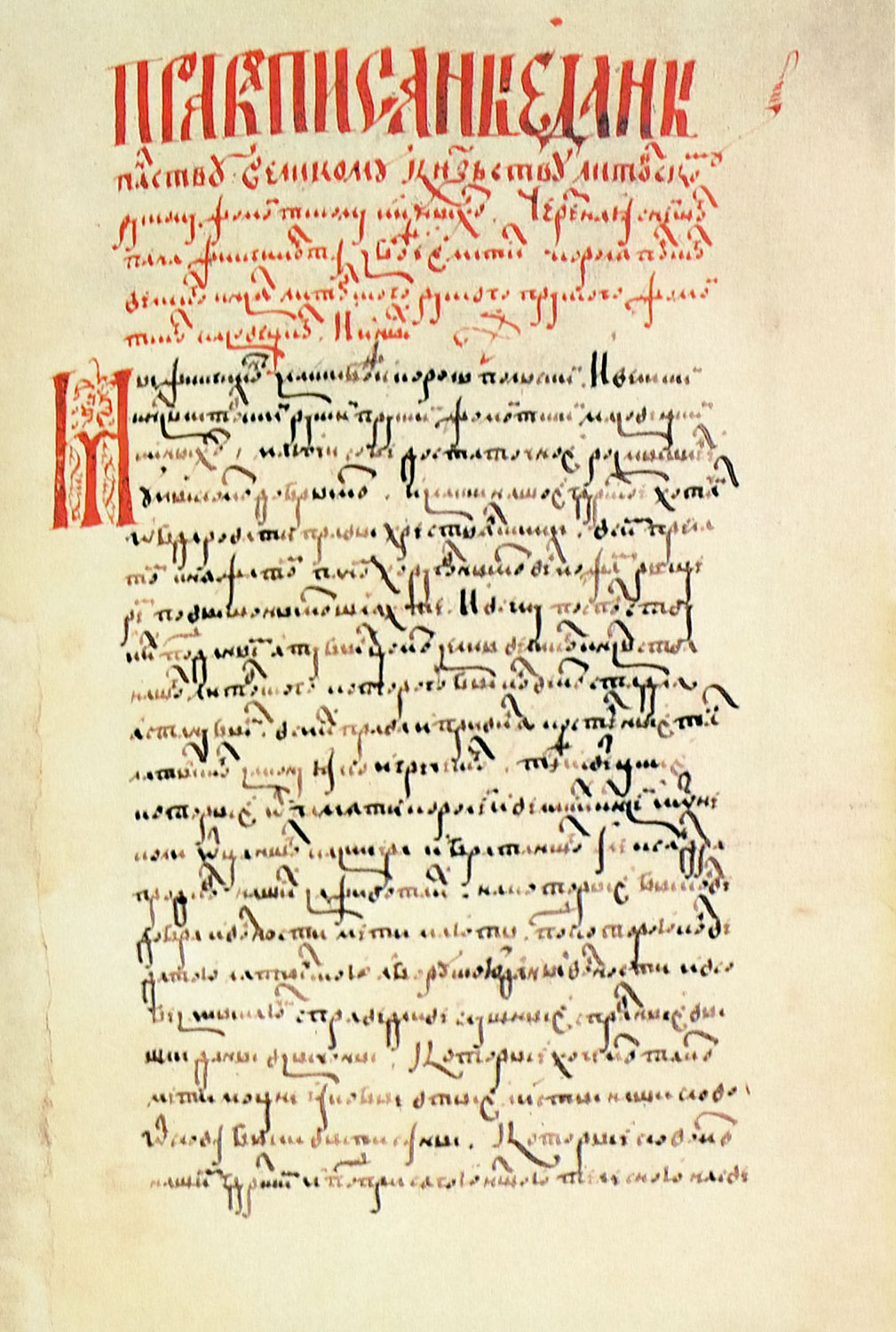
Lithuanian Statute of 1529, which provided guarantees of rights for Jews

According to Lithuanian-Ruthenian law, Jews enjoyed administrative and legal autonomy and were organized into separate communities (kahals) and had own courts using Jewish law in their proceedings. Special mixed courts were created to solve disputes between Jews and non-Jews, and the Statutes of Lithuania introduced equal penalty for the murder of Jews and szlachta. At the same time, Jews were prohibited from using serf labour. Gradually, Jews in the Grand Duchy of Lithuania received the same rights as Jews in the Polish Kingdom. Jewish self-government was represented by the Vaad, which met annually to decide on important financial, cultural and religious questions. According to a 1565 report by Papal nuncio Giovanni Francesco Commendone, Jews in Ukrainian lands owned land, engaged in trade and worked as doctors, but their main activities were rent and gathering of taxes. Competition from Jews led to the decline in trading activities among Armenians, and many magnates and even kings were indebted to Jewish financiers. During the 16th century Jew Abram Rebychkovych served as chief treasurer of the Grand Duchy of Lithuania.

Founded in 1569, the Polish–Lithuanian Commonwealth became one of the most diverse countries in Europe. During the Commonwealth era, the Jewish community became one of the largest and most important ethnic minority groups in the territory of Ukraine. Jews constituted 3 to 5% of the entire population of the Commonwealth, but in cities their share reached up to 20%. Many Jews worked as traders, but some also managed the estates of noble landowners (szlachta), which made them especially unpopular among Ukrainian peasants. Unlike the rest of the population, Jews spoke their own language – Yiddish, and governed themselves through autonomous communities, whose leaders were elected in a democratic manner. On the other hand, many elements of Jewish culture, such as folk beliefs, clothing and architecture (e.g. the construction technology of wooden synagogues) were shared with the Christian majority. The supreme representative organ of Jews in the Commonwealth, including Ukrainian lands, was the Council of Four Lands, which included members of Jewish communities from Greater Poland, Lesser Poland, Volhynia and Podolia.

== 17–18th centuries ==
=== Cossack and haidamak uprisings ===
By the 17th century, Jews inhabiting the lands of Ukraine engaged in gathering of taxes and served as intermediaries and arendators of noble estates. As a result, they were broadly perceived by the enserfed peasantry as agents of magnates, which led to popular anger being directed against both groups. Episodes of anti-Jewish violence by rebels were reported already during the Pavliuk uprising of 1637, but had a mostly local character.

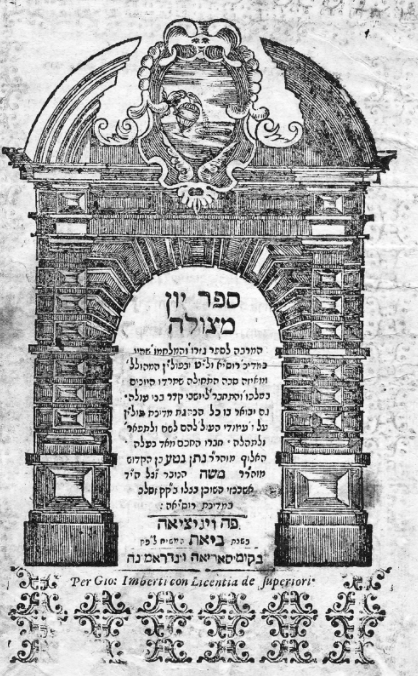
Title page of Nathan Hanover's Yeven Mezulah, dedicated to the Jewish victims of Khmelnytsky Uprising

In 1648–1657 Ukrainian Cossack Hetman Bohdan Khmelnytsky led a Cossack and peasant rebellion, known as Khmelnytsky uprising, during which Jews were targeted for their role as managers of noble estates, which was seen as oppression of Orthodox population on behalf of Catholic Poles. It is estimated that at that time the Jewish population in Ukraine numbered 51,325. Hundreds of Jewish communities were destroyed by the rebels, and tens of thousands of Jews were killed or sold as slaves.

Historians consider the massacres under Khmelnytsky to have been the bloodiest episode of anti-Jewish violence until the 20th century. A 1996 estimate reported that 15,000–30,000 Jews were killed or taken captive, and that 300 Jewish communities were destroyed. A 2014 estimate reduced the toll to 3,000–6,000 from 1648 to 1649; of these, 3,000–6,000 Jews were killed by Cossacks in Nemyriv in May 1648 and 1,500 in Tulczyn in July 1648. Among contemporary Jews the effect of Khmelnytsky Uprising was compared to the destruction of the First and Second Temples. As a result of the massacres, many Jews from Ukraine moved to western regions of Poland, or emigrated to German lands, Amsterdam and the Ottoman Empire.

Saving themselves from persecution or murder, many Jews in Ukraine were forced to adopt Christianity. There are reports about Jews taking part in Cossack activities during times before Khmelnytskyi's rebellion, and according to Bernard Dov Weinryb, there is evidence that some Jews took part in Cossack raids; more often, they converted to Christianity, but some remained Jewish. An order forbade Jews and burghers from participating in the raids, and a rabbinical source mentions the death of one Jew in a raid, and another whose wife demanded a divorce due to his participation. In 1611, there are records of the death of a Jewish Cossack hero named Boruch or Bracha. He was said to be one of eleven Jewish participants of a campaign, but it is not known if the others were Cossacks. There are some Jewish names in Cossack registers of 1649, and evidence of others converting while under attack in 1648.

Jewish converts to Christianity in the Cossack Hetmanate were able to receive equal rights with the Ukrainian majority, and continued to engage in trade, crafts and financial operations. Some baptized Jews even managed to enter the ranks of Cossack starshyna. In 1687–1704 Matviy Borokhovych, a Cossack of Jewish ancestry, served as colonel of Hadiach Regiment, and another ethnic Jew, Pavlo Hertsyk, led the Poltava Regiment between 1675 and 1695. Hertsyk's daughter Hanna became the wife of Cossack hetman Pylyp Orlyk. Other famous Ukrainian families of Jewish origin during that time were the Markevych clan, which descended from Pyriatyn arendator Marko Avramovych and produced a number of important Ukrainian political and cultural figures, including the wife of hetman Ivan Skoropadsky, and the Kryzhanivskyi family. The law codex of 1743 recognized those Jews in Ukraine who adopted Christianity to be equal to nobles.

Following the establishment of Russian imperial rule under Peter I, the settlement of Jews in Left-bank Ukraine was prohibited, although local authorities were reluctant in enforcing this measure. As of 1738 only around 600 Jews were reported to live in the region, and Jewish traders were also present in Zaporozhia and Sloboda Ukraine. In Right-bank Ukraine the situation differed significantly, as the 1667 Treaty of Andrusovo restored the system which had existed there before the 1648 uprising. Jewish population in the Ukrainian territories under Polish rule grew significantly starting from the late 17th century, and by the second half of the 18th century Galicia housed over 30% of all Jews in the Commonwealth, with cities such as Dobromyl, Przemyśl and Drohobych having a Jewish majority.

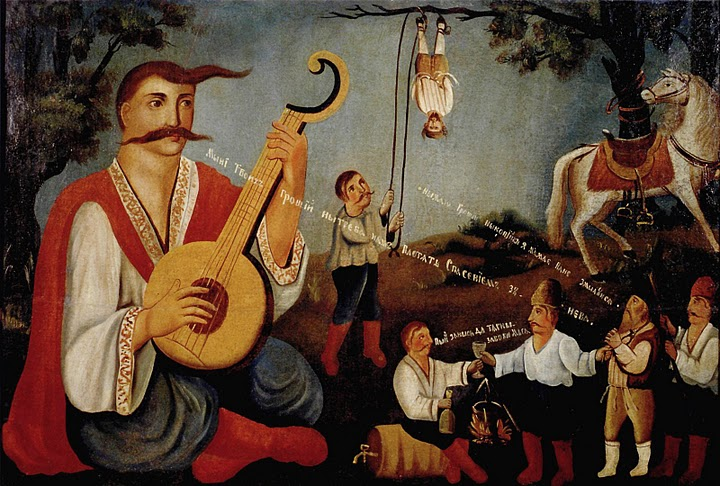
Cossack Mamay and the Haidamaka hang a Jew by his heels. Ukrainian folk art, 19th century

After bans on Jewish settlement in Russia had been confirmed under the rule of Anna Ioannovna, Elizabeth and Catherine II, many Jews started resettling to Polish-controlled territories, where they continued to engage in traditional occupations such as trade, usury, rent, innkeeping and small crafts. The general impoverishment of the local population contributed to intolerance against Jews. In 1747 and 1753 accusations of ritual murder were presented against the Jewish communities in Zaslav and Zhytomyr. However, despite a common stereotype, most Jews living in the area were even poorer than their non-Jewish counterparts.

The Jewish population of Right-bank Ukraine greatly suffered during the Koliivshchyna uprising of 1768, especially in the Massacre of Uman, where haidamak rebels murdered up to 20,000 Jews, although modern sources tend to give the number of up to 2,000 victims, including Poles. Twentieth-century Jewish historian Simon Dubnow called the events at Uman "the second Ukrainian catastrophe".

=== Rise of Hasidism and internal struggles ===
The Cossack Uprising and following massacres left a deep and lasting impression on Jewish social and spiritual life and led to the rise in popularity of Jewish mysticism including Kabbalah. The 1648 events in Ukraine played a role in the development of a number of messianic movements in Judaism, such as the sect of Sabbatai Zevi. These movements opposed traditional rabbinism and put an emphasis on magical healing practices, amulets and physical activity such as singing, dancing and prayer.

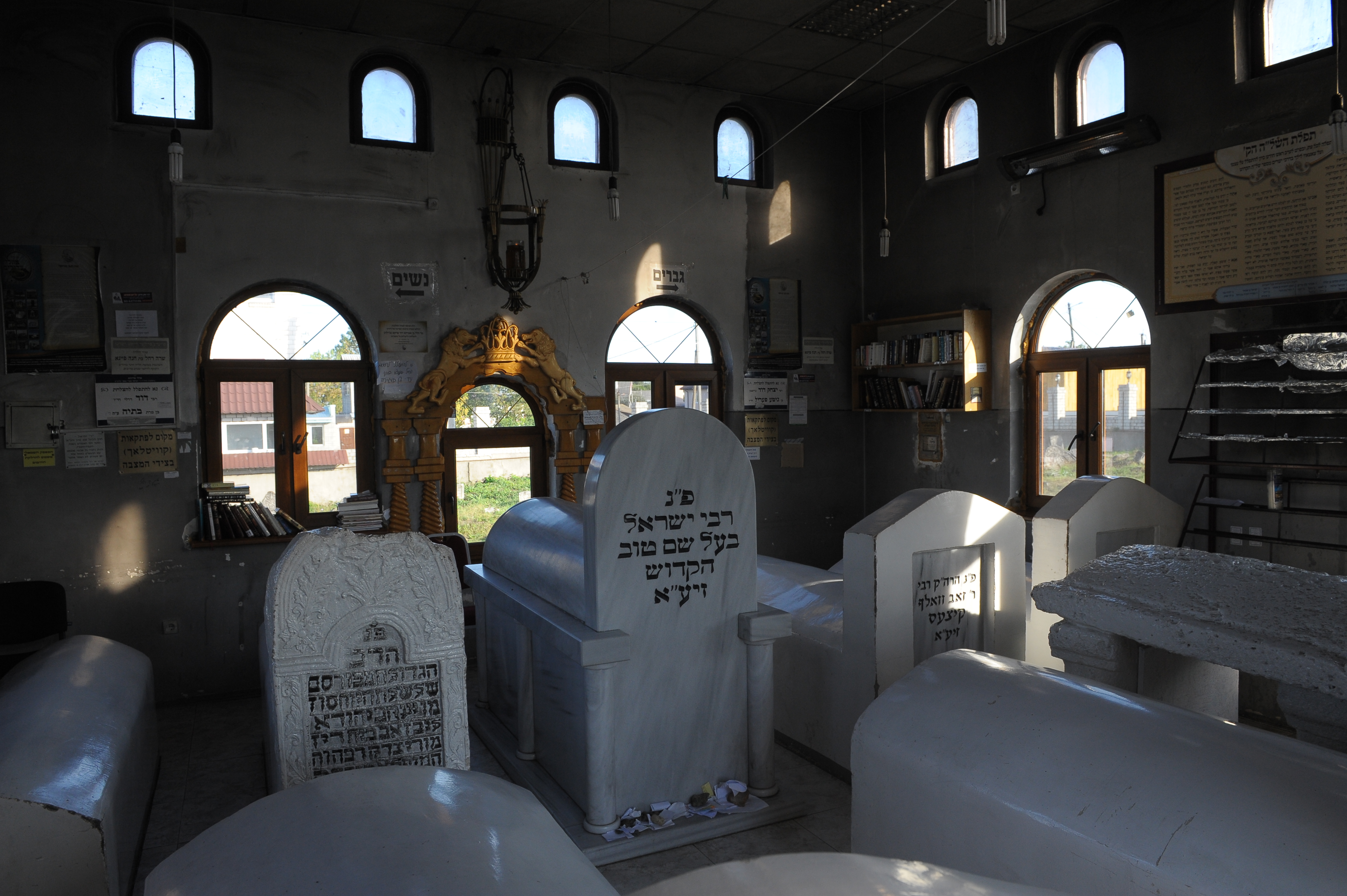
Grave of Baal Shem Tov in Medzhybizh

The teachings of Israel ben Eliezer, better known as the Baal Shem Tov, or BeShT (1698–1760), who lived in the Ukrainian town of Medzhybizh, produced a massive religious movement which had a profound effect on Eastern European Jews. Known as Hasidism, it influenced Haredi Judaism, with a continuous influence through many Hasidic dynasties. The emergence of Hasidism with its specific rules and rites produced a strong opposition from traditional Ashkenazi Jewish circles. As a result of a split between Hasidic Jewish communities and their opponents (Mitnagdim) in the Polish-Lithuanian Commonwealth, a territorial division emerged, with Hasidic rites dominating among poorer and less educated Jews in Volhynia, Podolia, Galicia and Hungarian-ruled territories of modern-day Ukraine.

A different movement was started by Jacob Frank in the middle of the 18th century. Frank's teachings were unorthodox (such as purification through transgression and adoption of elements of Christianity) and were supported by part of the Catholic clergy, including the bishop of Kamieniec Podolski, which led to his excommunication along with his numerous followers. In 1759 Frank and his supporters converted to Catholicism in Lemberg. As a result, a group of up to 20,000 Jewish converts emerged, who gradually assimilated with Christians, but preserved some peculiar traditions. In 1817 Frankists were officially recognized as Catholics by the Russian imperial government.

== 19th century ==
=== In the Russian Empire ===
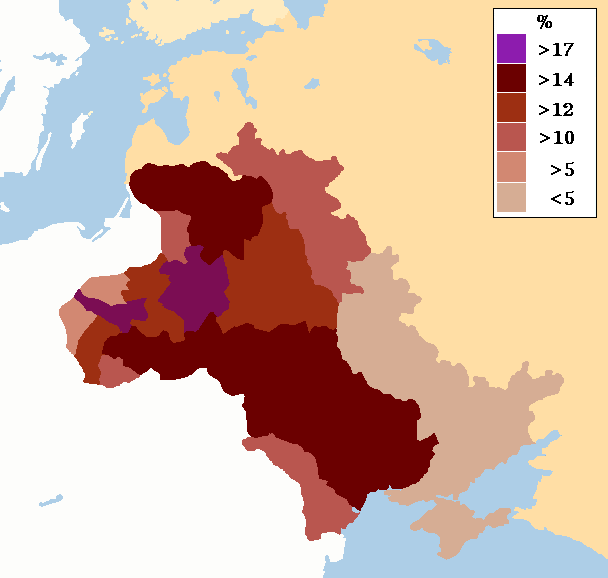
Map of the Pale of Settlement

==== Pale of Settlement ====
In Russian Empire until the partitions of Poland Jewish communities were not officially recognized. However, as a result of the partitions, between 1772 and 1795 around 750,000 Jews in Belarus, Ukraine and Lithuania became subjects of the Russian Empire, followed by Jews of Central Poland, which also came under Russian control as a result of the Congress of Vienna. As a result, Imperial Russia became home to the largest Jewish community in the world. Empress Catherine the Great (1762–1796), a follower of the European Enlightenment ideas, initially provided the Jews equal rights with the rest of her subjects, categorizing them as burghers. In 1764 Jews were permitted to settle in Novorossiya Governorate, and a decree from 1785 granted them equal rights with Christians. However, due to protests of Moscow merchants, whose businesses suffered due to competition with their Jewish counterparts, in 1791 the Jewish right of residence was limited to the Pale of Settlement, which included territories annexed from Poland-Lithuania, as well as the Black Sea region. Paul I allowed Jews to settle in Kyiv and Kamianets-Podilskyi, but introduced double taxation for Jewish merchants.

The 1804 Statute for the Jews obliged Jews in the Russian Empire to adopt surnames, required them to use official languages in documentation and put rabbis under special supervision of the state. In rural localities Jews were limited in their right to act as tavernkeepers, and the government made unsuccessful attempts to expel Jews from villages to cities. Under the rule of Nicholas I Jewish families were required to provide recruits for the army, with boys as young as 12 years old (cantonists) having to leave their families to receive military training; many of them later converted to Orthodox Christianity. Starting from 1804, the government promoted Jewish settlement on land, establishing Jewish agricultural colonies in Southern Ukraine. As of 1870, 56 Jewish agricultural colonies housing 14,000 people existed in the territories of Volhynia, Kiev and Podolia Governorates. According to decrees from 1804 and 1835, Jews were allowed to receive general and special education, but by the end of the 19th century Jewish quotas of 3–6% were introduced at middle and high schools. In 1826 the first Jewish public school was established in Odesa. Special schools for Jewish children were established along with a school for rabbis, which opened in Zhytomyr. To finance those establishments, Jewish communities were obliged to pay additional taxes.

In 1824 Jewish migration from abroad was banned, with the exception of specialists and industrialists. Between 1827 and 1861 Jews were banished from Kyiv, and in Sloboda Ukraine their settlement was limited to Kharkiv. In 1844 the government abolished the kahal, depriving Jewish communities of their officially recognized autonomy. Special taxes were also introduced on kosher meat and sabbath candles. Those rules were partially relaxed under the rule of Alexander II of Russia, but after 1870 Jews were still limited from executing rights in many areas. For example, Jewish members were banned from taking more than one-third of places in local councils, even if the locality had a Jewish majority, and Jews were also banned from being appointed mayors. An exception were Karaites, who in 1863 were granted equal rights with the Christian population. Those Jews who agreed to convert received equal rights with Christians, but the number of such people remained insignificant.

Odesa became the home of a large Jewish community during the 19th century, and by 1897 Jews were estimated to account for some 37% of the population. The city also became known as a centre of publishing and education, with the first Jewish magazines in Russian (Rassvet, 1860) and Yiddish (Kol Mevasser, 1863) being published there.

==== Pogroms and persecutions ====
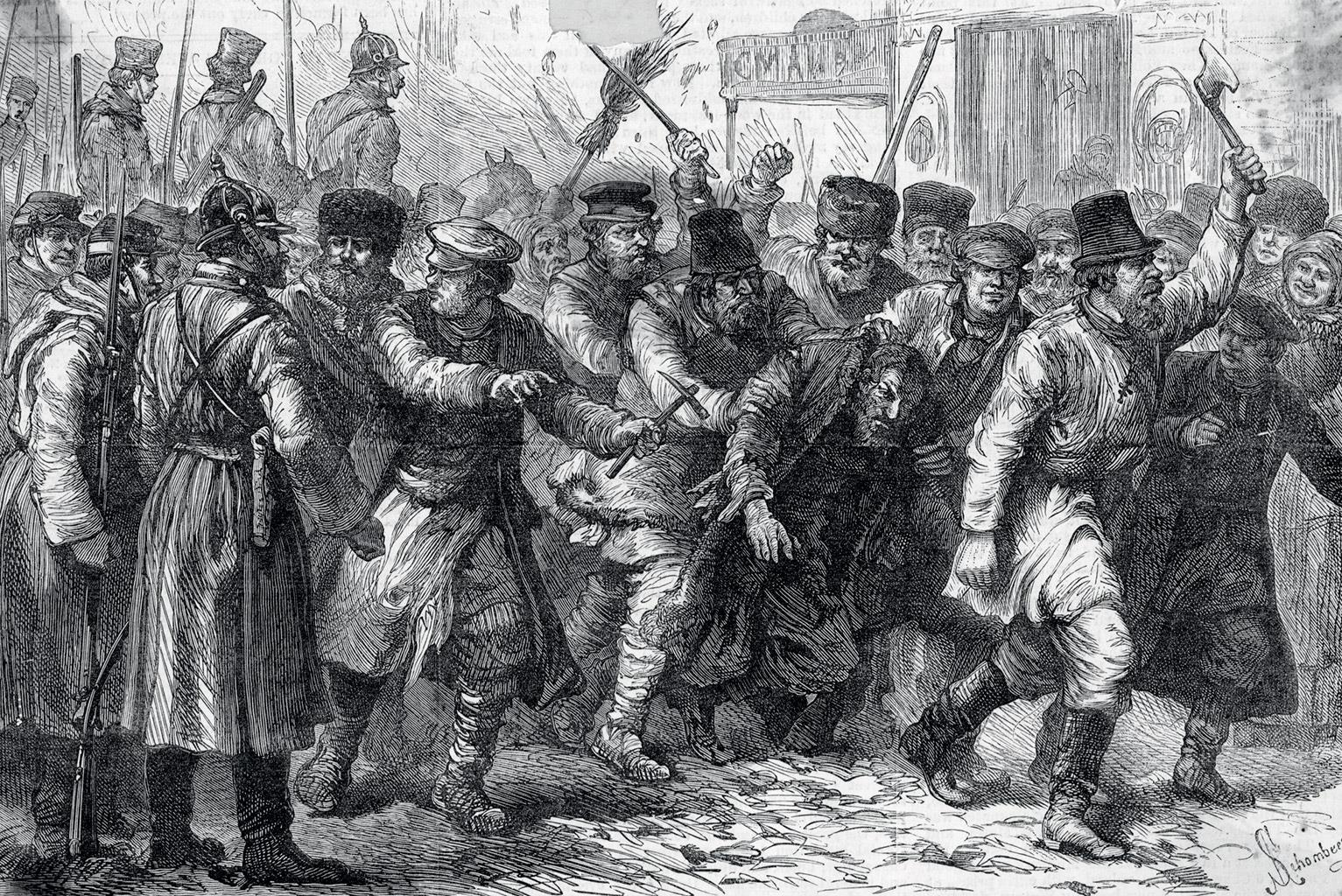
Scene from an anti-Jewish pogrom in Kyiv, 1881

During 1821 anti-Jewish riots in Odesa after the death of the Greek Orthodox patriarch in Constantinople, 14 Jews were killed. Some sources mark this episode as the first pogrom, while according to others (such as the Jewish Encyclopedia, 1911 ed.) the first pogrom was an 1859 riot in Odesa. The term became common after a wave of anti-Jewish violence swept the southern Russian Empire (including Ukraine) between 1881 and 1884, after Jews were blamed for the assassination of Alexander II. Major pogroms during that time took place in Yelysavethrad, Kiev and Volhynia.

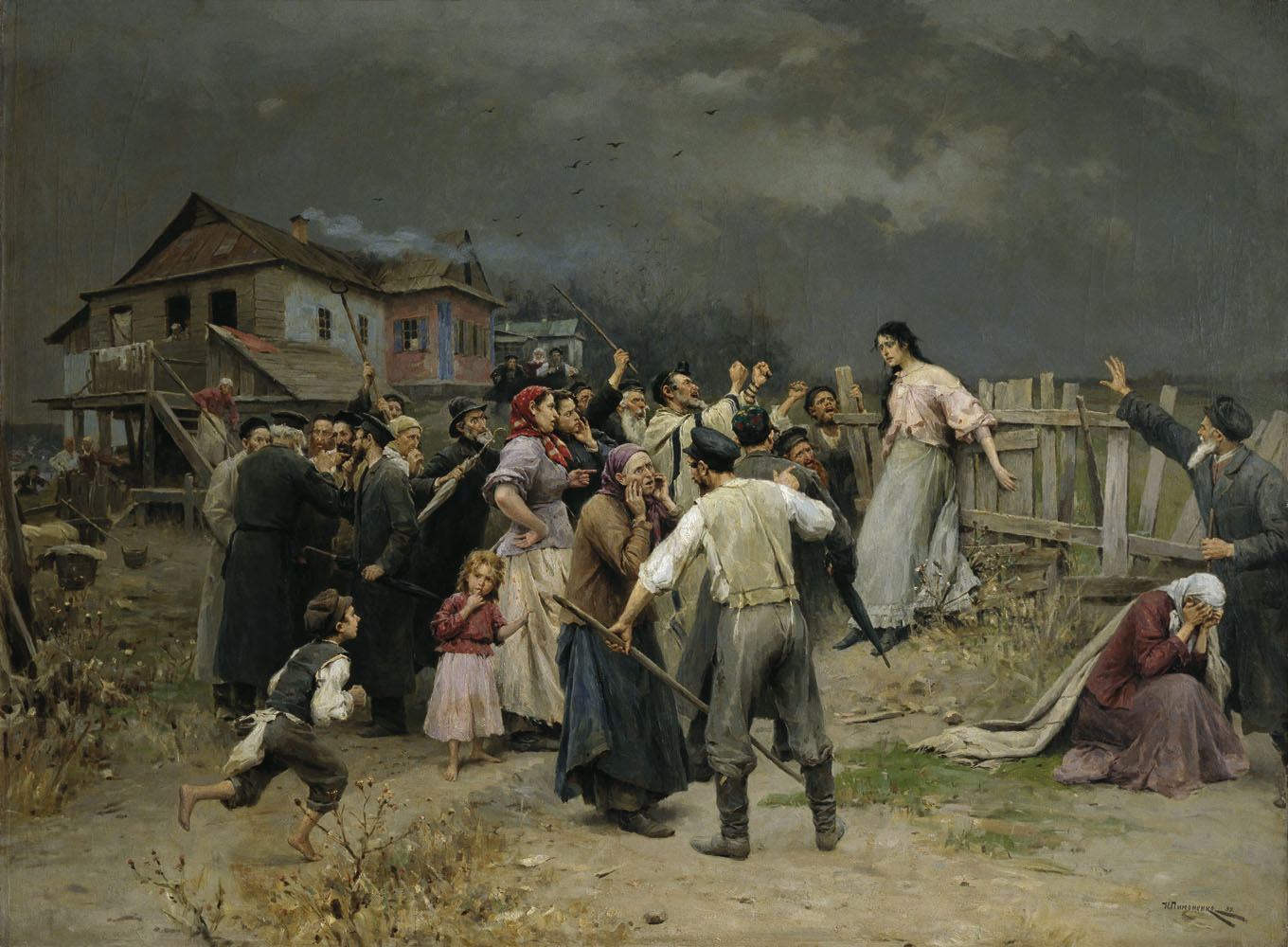
A Victim of Fanaticism (1899) by Mykola Pymonenko, depicting the hostility of the traditional Jewish community to a Jewish girl who fell in love with a Ukrainian blacksmith and decided to convert to Christianity to marry him

In May 1882, Alexander III of Russia introduced temporary regulations called May Laws that remained in effect until 1917. Systematic policies of discrimination, strict quotas on the number of Jews allowed to obtain education and professions caused widespread poverty and mass emigration. In 1886, an edict of Expulsion was applied to Jews in Kyiv. In 1893–1894, some areas of Crimea were removed from the Pale.

When Alexander III died in Crimea on 20 October 1894, according to Simon Dubnow: "as the body of the deceased was carried by railway to St. Petersburg, the same rails were carrying the Jewish exiles from Yalta to the Pale. The reign of Alexander III began with pogroms and concluded with expulsions."

==== Political activism and emigration ====
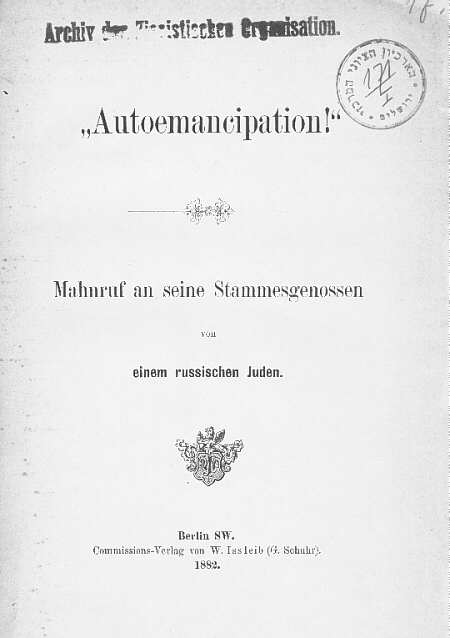
German-language edition of Auto-Emancipation by Leon Pinsker, 1882

The latter decades of the Russian Empire's existence were marked by a significant generational break in the Jewish community. During that period many Jews entered the workers' movement, while others participated in Zionist organizations, adopted Orthodox Judaism or took part in liberal politics. Although Jews were a minority among members of the revolutionary movement, the number of their representatives in respect to the general population was unproportionally high. This could be caused by the traditional role of Jews as intermediaries between the urban and rural population.

The spread of the Haskala movement in the Russian Empire during the 19th century led to the emergence of a Jewish intelligentsia, which initially adopted liberal positions and a Russian civic identity, demanding the reformation of the traditional Jewish community and religious life, promoting publishing and education, and calling for the provision of equal rights to the Jewish population of the empire. As a minority with a higher-than-average level of literacy and a tendency to multilingualism – many Jews would speak both Yiddish, their native language, as well as Russian, the official language, along with the languages of their immediate neighbours, such as Polish, Ukrainian, Latvian or Belarusian – Jews had more chances to receive higher education and become active in publishing and political activities.

Leon Pinsker, a doctor from Odessa, became one of the founders of political Zionism with his pamphlet Auto-Emancipation (1882), which called for the emergence of Jews as a separate political nation.

Starting from the late 19th century, overpopulation, economic troubles and pogroms led to mass emigration of Jews across the ocean, mainly to New York City. At the same time, many Jews left villages and shtetls and moved to big cities.

=== In the Habsburg Empire ===
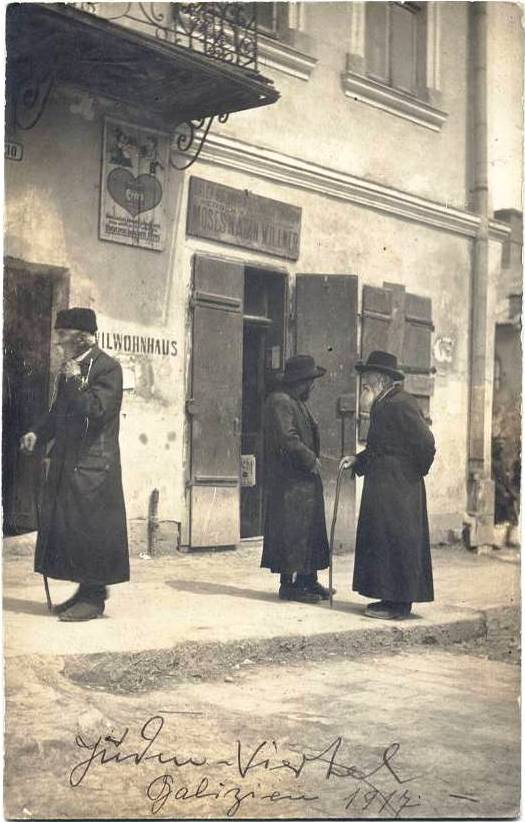
Jews in Berezhany, Austrian Galicia, 1917

After the establishment of Austrian rule in formerly Polish Galicia, a number of requirements were introduced for local Jews, such as the need to pass a German language exam to receive a marriage certificate, as well as taxes on kosher meat and candles. Activists of the Haskala introduced measures against Hasidic influence in the region, which included publishing of rabbinical texts and foundation of schools. However, reform movements in Judaism remained unpopular among the majority of Galician Jews. Following the Partitions of Poland, many Galician Jews started moving to neighbouring territories under Austrian rule. In Bukovyna the Jewish population increased from around 500 families in 1786 to 14,600 in 1850 and 47,800 in 1870. In Transcarpathia the number of Jews grew from in 1783 to 52,000 in 1840 and 86,400 in 1857.

Initially, Jews in Austria-Hungary had their rights limited by Josephine Patents. After 1848 emancipation was gradually introduced, and in 1860 Jews received equal rights with other Austrian subjects. By 1874, 71 Jews were represented in local parliaments, as well as 5 in the Galician Sejm; many Jewish representatives were also active in local councils, and 10 of them served as mayors. In Hungarian-ruled areas most limitations against the Jewish population were abolished in 1859–1860, and after the formation of Austria-Hungary in 1867 Jews were recognized as equal citizens.

In the late 19th century the Jewish population of Austria-Hungary reached about 2 million people and comprised the second biggest Jewish community in the world. In Galicia Jews formed around 10% of the local population, but in some cities, such as Brody, their share stood at 90%. In Lemberg during that time more than one third of the population was Jewish. Many localities in the region served as points of pilgrimage for followers of various Hasidic dynasties.

Jews in Austro-Hungarian territories generally engaged in small-scale trade, finance and crafts; only 5 to 10% of the Jewish population was active in agriculture. Many Jews served as intermediaries between peasants and landlords, especially in poorer mountainous regions. Jewish businessmen rented lands and inns, and also took part in the exploitation of oil sources in the area of Boryslav. The need to compete with Jews was one of the causes for the emergence of a cooperative movement among the local Ukrainian population. At the same time, during the early 20th century, Jewish and Ukrainian politicians achieved a measure of cooperation between their parties, and after the 1907 election to Vienna Parliament two Jewish deputies elected to the organ pledged to promote Ukrainian demands in the legislature. During the early 20th century Jewish daily newspaper Chwila was published in Lviv. Some Galician Jews, such as Wilhelm Feldman, adopted Polonophile positions, while others sympathized with Zionist ideas. Austrian Bukovyna served as a major centre of Jewish culture, and its capital Chernivtsi (Czernowitz) hosted the first Jewish language congress organized by Nathan Birnbaum.

== Early 20th century ==
=== Before WW1 ===
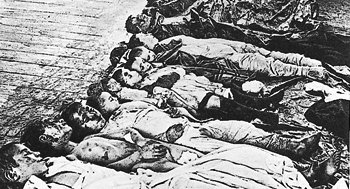
The victims of a 1905 pogrom in Yekaterinoslav

At the turn of the 20th century, Jews in the Russian Empire had their representatives among the merchant class, factory owners bankers and higher intelligentsia, but the general mass of Jewish population was threatened with pauperization. During that period, almost 30% of world's Jewry was concentrated in the borders of modern-day Ukraine, with western and central-western parts of the country having Jewish populations exceed 10–15% of the general number of inhabitants. Various political movements attained popularity in the Jewish society of the time, with one part of the community promoting assimilationist views, while others embraced the movements for Jewish political and cultural resurgence. Many members of the Jewish proletariat and lower intelligentsia entered the Russian revolutionary movement, but only a small part adopted pro-Ukrainian ideas.

At the start of the 20th century, anti-Jewish pogroms continued to occur in cities and towns across the Russian Empire such as Kishinev, Kyiv, Odesa, Zhytomyr, Nizhyn, Gomel, Belostok and many others. Anti-Jewish attitudes were consciously promoted by the government authorities of the time, as they attempted to distract the popular attention from the injustices of the existing regime. Many of the pogroms were a result of chauvinistic propaganda spread by Russian reactionary circles, such as the Union of Russian People, although oppositional movements such as People's Will also had their share of antisemites. Numerous Jewish self-defense groups were organized to prevent the outbreak of pogroms among which the most successful one was under the leadership of Mishka Yaponchik in Odesa.

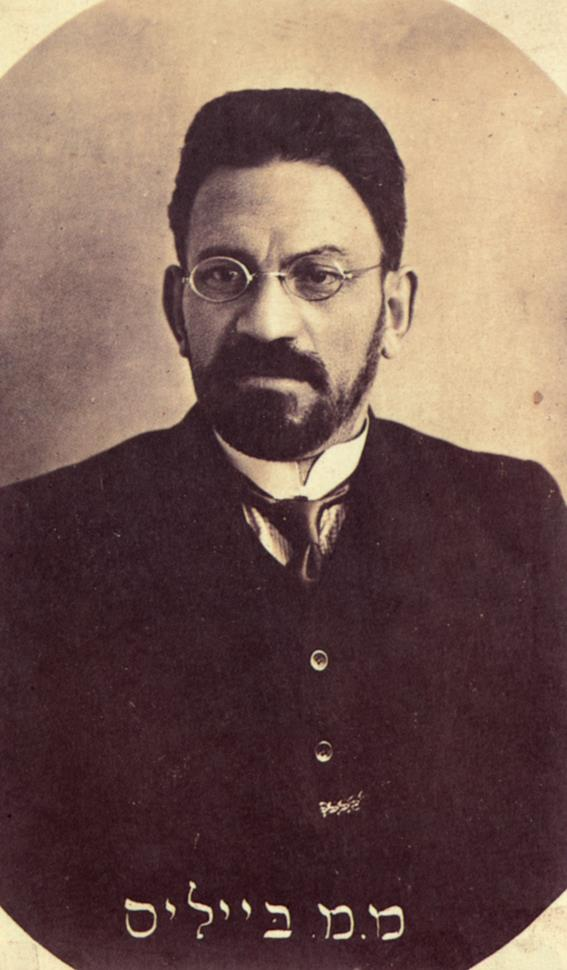
Portrait of Menahem Mendel Beilis, a Jew from Vasylkiv who was an exonerated in a blood libel case

In 1905, a series of pogroms erupted at the same time as the Revolution against the government of Nicholas II. The chief organizers of the pogroms were the members of the Union of the Russian People (commonly known as the "Black Hundreds"). Counter-revolutionary groups opposed the Revolution with violent attacks on socialists and pogroms against Jews. A backlash came from the conservative elements of society, notably in spasmodic anti-Jewish attacks – around five hundred were killed in a single day in Odesa. Nicholas II claimed that 90% of revolutionaries were Jews.

From 1911 to 1913, the antisemitic tenor of the period was characterized by a number of blood libel cases (accusations of Jews murdering Christians for ritual purposes). One of the most famous was the two-year trial of Menahem Mendel Beilis, a Jew from Kyiv, who was charged with the murder of a Christian boy. The trial was showcased by the authorities to illustrate the perfidy of the Jewish population.

In 1912–1914, S. An-sky led the Jewish Ethnographic Expedition to the Pale, which visited around 70 shtetls in Volyn, Podolia, and Galicia (all in modern Ukraine) gathering folk stories, artifacts, recording music, and making photos, as an attempt to preserve and salvage traditional Ashkenazim culture that was vanishing because of modernization, pogroms, and emigration.

From March to May 1915, in the face of the German army, the government expelled thousands of Jews from the Empire's border areas, mainly the Pale of Settlement.

=== Ukrainian People's Republic ===
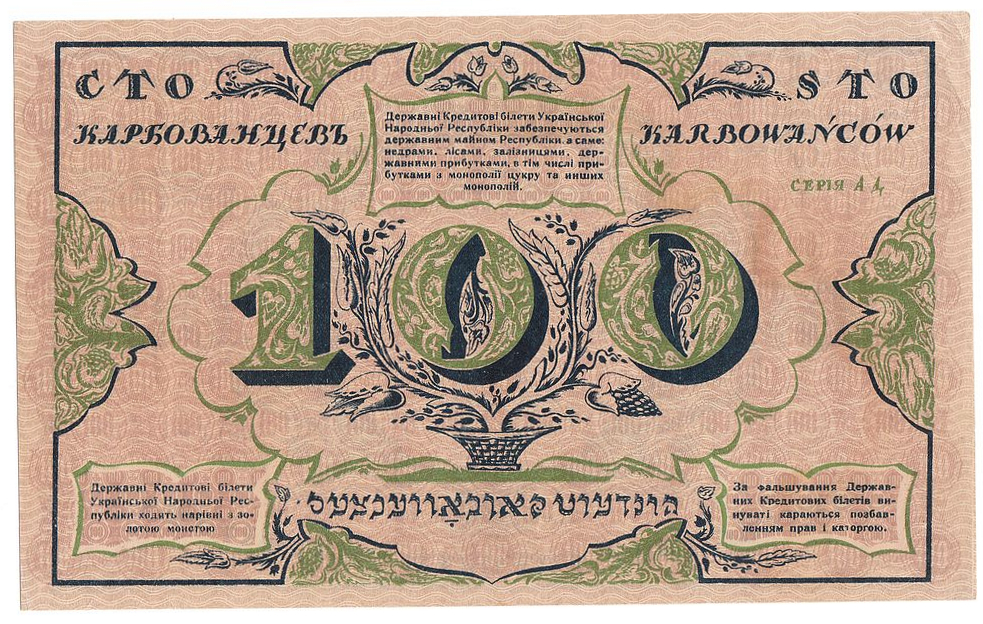
1917. 100 karbovanets of the Ukrainian National Republic. Revers. 3 languages: Ukrainian, Polish and Yiddish.

After the establishment of the Ukrainian People's Republic (UPR, 1917–1921) in the aftermath of the February Revolution, Yiddish was recognized as one of its official languages, while all government institutions had Jewish members. A Ministry for Jewish Affairs was established (Ukraine was the first modern state to do so) and rights of Jewish culture were guaranteed. On 8 January 1918 Ukrainian Central Council adopted a law providing Jews and other national minorities with national personal autonomy. During that time many Yiddish schools functioned in Ukraine, initially supported by the Vice-Secretariat for Jewish Affairs, and later by the Ministry for Jewish Affairs. The establishment of Kultur Lige in 1918 made Kyiv a centre of Jewish culture. A chair of Jewish history and literature was opened at the newly established Kamianets-Podilskyi University.

Among the prominent Ukrainian Jewish statesmen of this period were Moisei Rafes, Pinkhas Krasny, Abram Revutsky, Moishe Zilberfarb, and many others. (see General Secretariat of Ukraine) The autonomy of Ukraine was openly greeted by Volodymyr Zhabotinsky, himself a native of Ukraine. In total, deputies from Jewish parties had 35 seats in Ukraine's legislative organs, and some of them served as part of the Ukrainian diplomatic corps. However, very few Jews were present in Ukrainian political parties, and the general part of the Jewish community in Ukraine tended to support Russian unity, while others sympathized with the Bolsheviks. As a result, most Jewish deputies abstained or voted against the Tsentralna Rada's Fourth Universal of 25 January 1918 which was aimed at breaking ties with Bolshevik Russia and proclaiming a sovereign Ukrainian state, since all Jewish parties were strongly against Ukrainian independence.

During the ensuing Russian Civil War, an estimated 70,000 to 250,000 Jewish civilians were killed in atrocities throughout the former Russian Empire. In modern Ukraine an estimated 31,071 died in 1918–1920. Other estimates give the number of civilian Jews killed during the period as 35,000 to 50,000. Archives declassified after 1991 provide evidence of a higher number; in the period from 1918 to 1921, "according to incomplete data, at least 100,000 Jews were killed in Ukraine in the pogroms." The Ukrainian People's Republic did issue orders condemning pogroms and attempted to investigate them, but it lacked authority to stop the violence. In the last months of its existence the state lacked any power to create social stability.

Between April and December 1918 the Ukrainian People's Republic was non-existent and overthrown by the Ukrainian State of Pavlo Skoropadsky, who ended the experiment in Jewish autonomy. There was one Jewish member serving in the Ukrainian government under Skoropadsky.

=== Provisional Government of Russia and Soviets ===
The February 1917 revolution brought a liberal Provisional Government to power in the Russian Empire. On 21 March/3 April, the government removed all "discrimination based upon ethnic religious or social grounds". The Pale was officially abolished. The removal of the restrictions on Jews' geographical mobility and educational opportunities led to a migration to the country's major cities.

One week after the 25 October / 7 November 1917 Bolshevik Revolution, the new government proclaimed the "Declaration of the Rights of the Peoples [Nations] of Russia," promising all nationalities the rights of equality, self-determination and secession. Jews were not specifically mentioned in the declaration, reflecting Lenin's view that Jews did not constitute a nation.

In 1918, the RSFSR Council of Ministers issued a decree entitled "On the Separation of Church from State and School from Church", depriving religious communities of the status of juridical persons, the right to own property and the right to enter into contracts. The decree nationalized the property of religious communities and banned their assessment of religious tuition. As a result, religion could be taught or studied only in private.

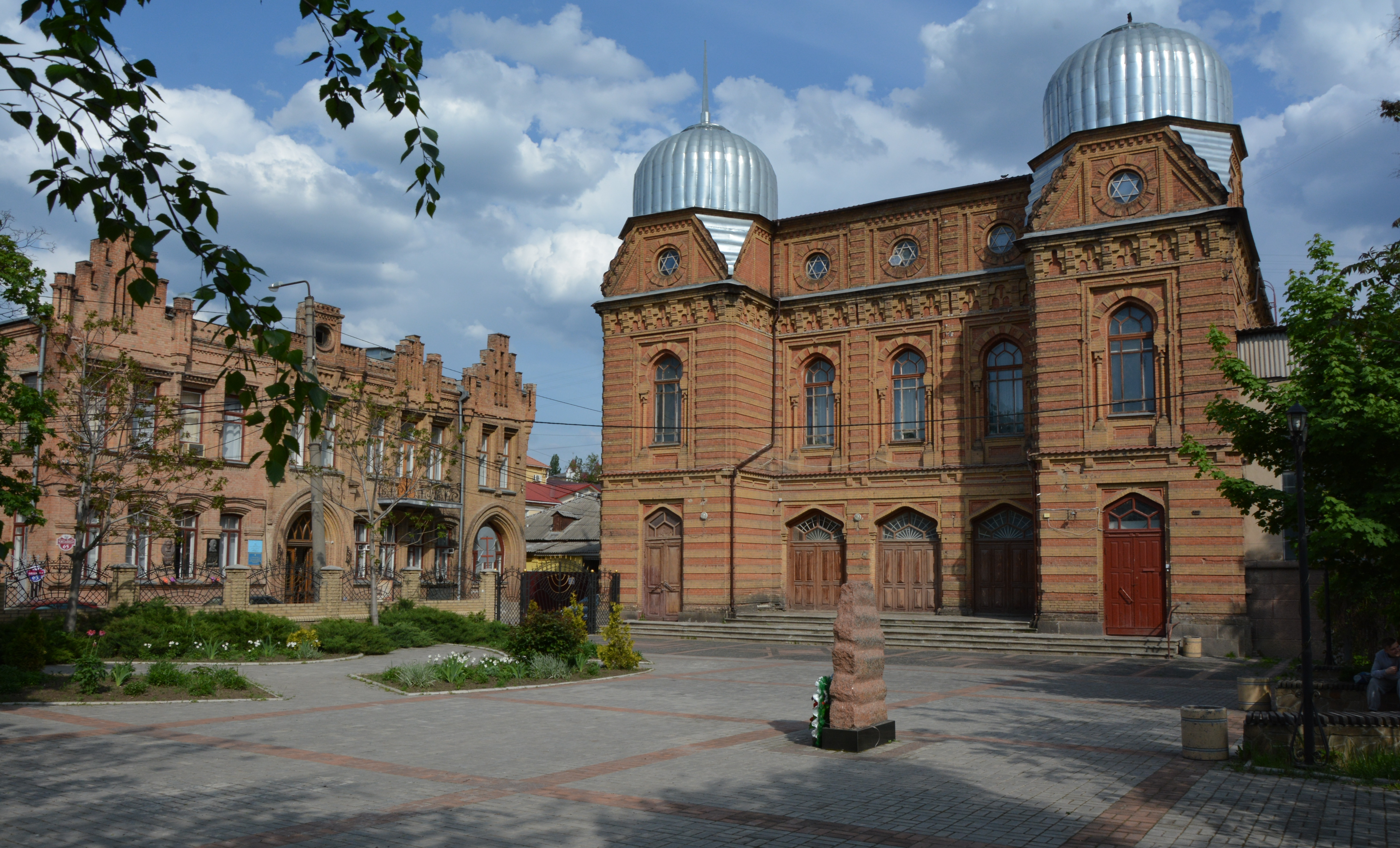
Main Synagogue of Yelisavetgrad looted by Hryhoriv's rebels

On 1 February 1918 the Commissariat for Jewish National Affairs was established as a subsection of the Commissariat for Nationality Affairs. It was mandated to establish the "dictatorship of the proletariat in the Jewish streets" and attract the Jewish masses to the regime while advising local and central institutions on Jewish issues. The Commissariat was also expected to fight the influence of Zionist and Jewish-Socialist Parties. On 27 July 1918 the Council of People's Commissars issued a decree stating that antisemitism is "fatal to the cause of the ... revolution". Pogroms were officially outlawed. On 20 October 1918 the Jewish section of the CPSU (Yevsektsia) was established for the Party's Jewish members; its goals were similar to those of the Jewish Commissariat.

During the Hryhoriv uprising in May 1919, almost 3000 Jews of Yelisavetgrad (today Kropyvnytskyi) were murdered and their property stolen during a mutiny of Bolshevik troops. Many richer Jews became victims of Bolshevik repressions against the bourgeoisie and capitalists.

=== The White Army and counterrevolutionary pogroms ===
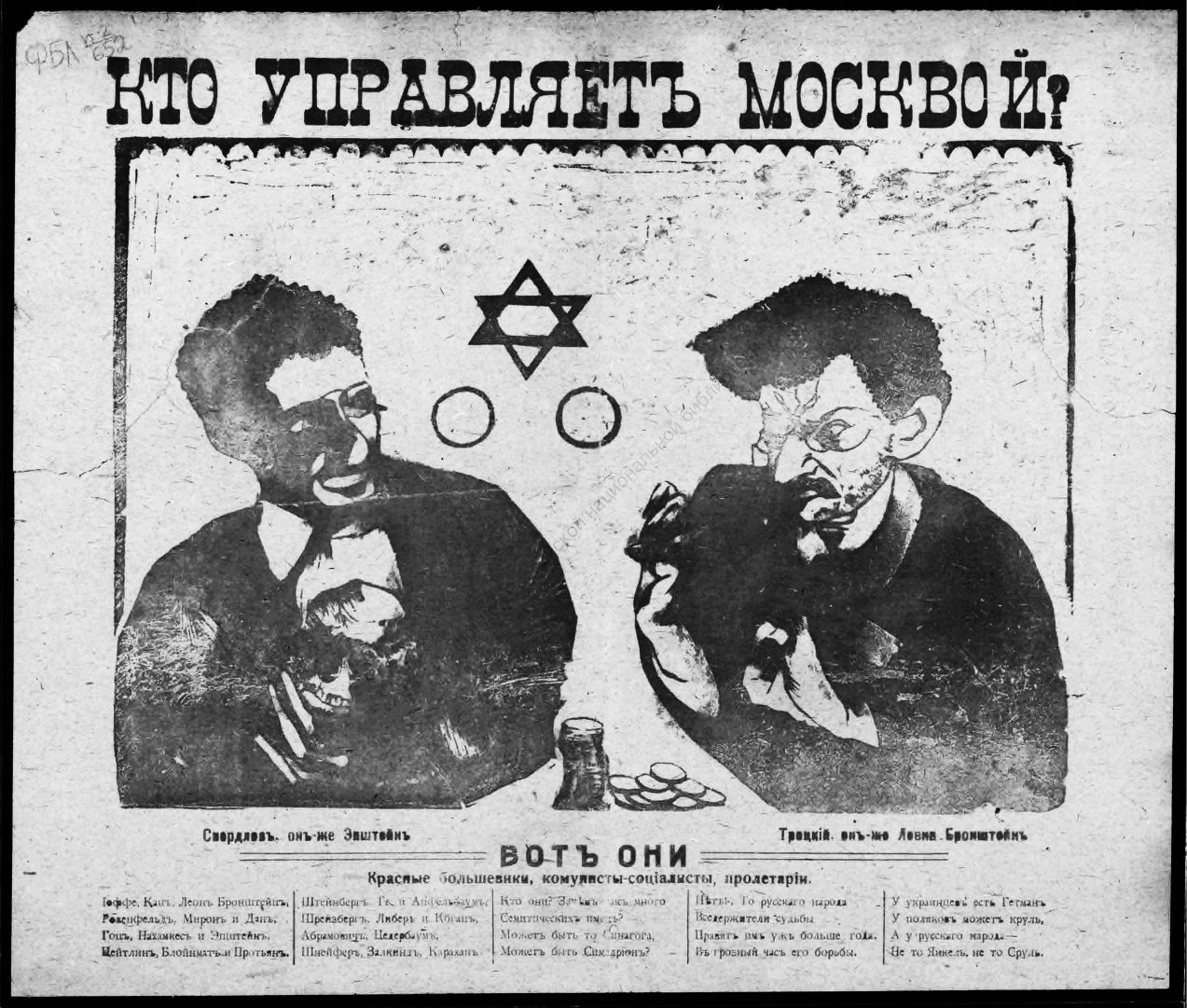
Antisemitic poster issued by the Whites during the Russian Civil War

In contrast with the Bolshevik government's official policy of equality among citizens, antisemitism remained deeply entrenched in the political and social ideologies of the tsarist counterrevolutionaries, especially among paramilitary groups such as the Black Hundreds. These militias incited and organized pogroms against Russian Jews. The official slogan of the Black Hundreds was "Bei Zhidov," meaning 'Beat the Jews.' Thus, during the Russian Civil War that followed the 1917 Revolution, the Jews became a crucial site of the conflict between revolutionary Reds and counterrevolutionary Whites, particularly in the contested territory of Ukraine. The Bolsheviks' official opposition to antisemitism—coupled with the prominence of Jews such as Leon Trotsky within the Bolshevik ranks—allowed the Christian nationalist movements of both the White Army and the emergent Ukrainian National Republic to link Ukrainian Jews to the despised communism. These connections, combined with the cultural tradition of antisemitism among Russian peasantry, provided ample justification for the Whites to attack Ukraine's Jewish population. Between 1918 and 1921, almost all of the approximately 2,000 pogroms carried out in Ukraine were organized by White Army forces. eyewitnesses reported hearing counterrevolutionary militia members expound slogans such as, "We beat the Yids, we beat the Commune", and "This is the answer to the Bolsheviks for the Red Terror." Recent studies hold that about 30,000 Jews were killed in these pogroms, while another 150,000 died from wounds sustained during the violence.

=== Pogroms in western and northern Ukraine ===
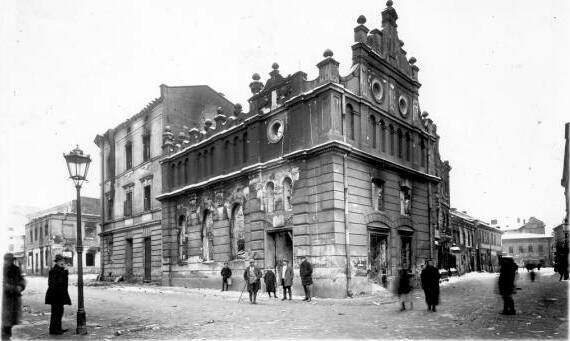
Jewish quarter in Lviv after the November 1918 pogrom

During the Polish-Ukrainian War in late 1918 Galician Jews were suspected by many Poles to have collaborated with forces of the West Ukrainian People's Republic (WUPR). The republic's government offered representatives of local Jews seats in the Ukrainian National Council, but they refused. Despite the official position of neutrality adopted by the Jewish community, it remained generally loyal to the WUPR. As a result, after Polish troops entered Lviv on 22 November 1918 a pogrom was perpetrated by Poles in the city's Jewish quarter, killing at least 75 inhabitants, although higher estimates also exist. The event caused indignation in global press. After the pogrom Polish military command accused Lviv's Jews of not restraining their compatriots and threatened with catastrophic circumstances in case of their opposition to Polish authorities. Following the pogrom, part of the Jews entered the Ukrainian Galician Army, where a separate Jewish battalion existed.

In the territory controlled by Ukrainian forces pogroms erupted in January 1919 in the northwest province of Volhynia and spread during February and March to the cities, towns, and villages of many other regions of Ukraine. After Sarny it was the turn of Ovruch, northwest of Kyiv. In Tetiev on 25 March, approximately 4,000 Jews were murdered, half in a synagogue set ablaze by Cossack troops under Colonels Kurovsky, Cherkowsy, and Shliatoshenko. Then Vashilkov (6 and 7 April). In Dubovo (17 June) 800 Jews were decapitated in assembly-line fashion. According to David A. Chapin, the town of Proskurov (now Khmelnitsky), near the city of Sudilkov, "was the site of the worst atrocity committed against Jews this century before the Nazis." Pogroms continued until 1921.

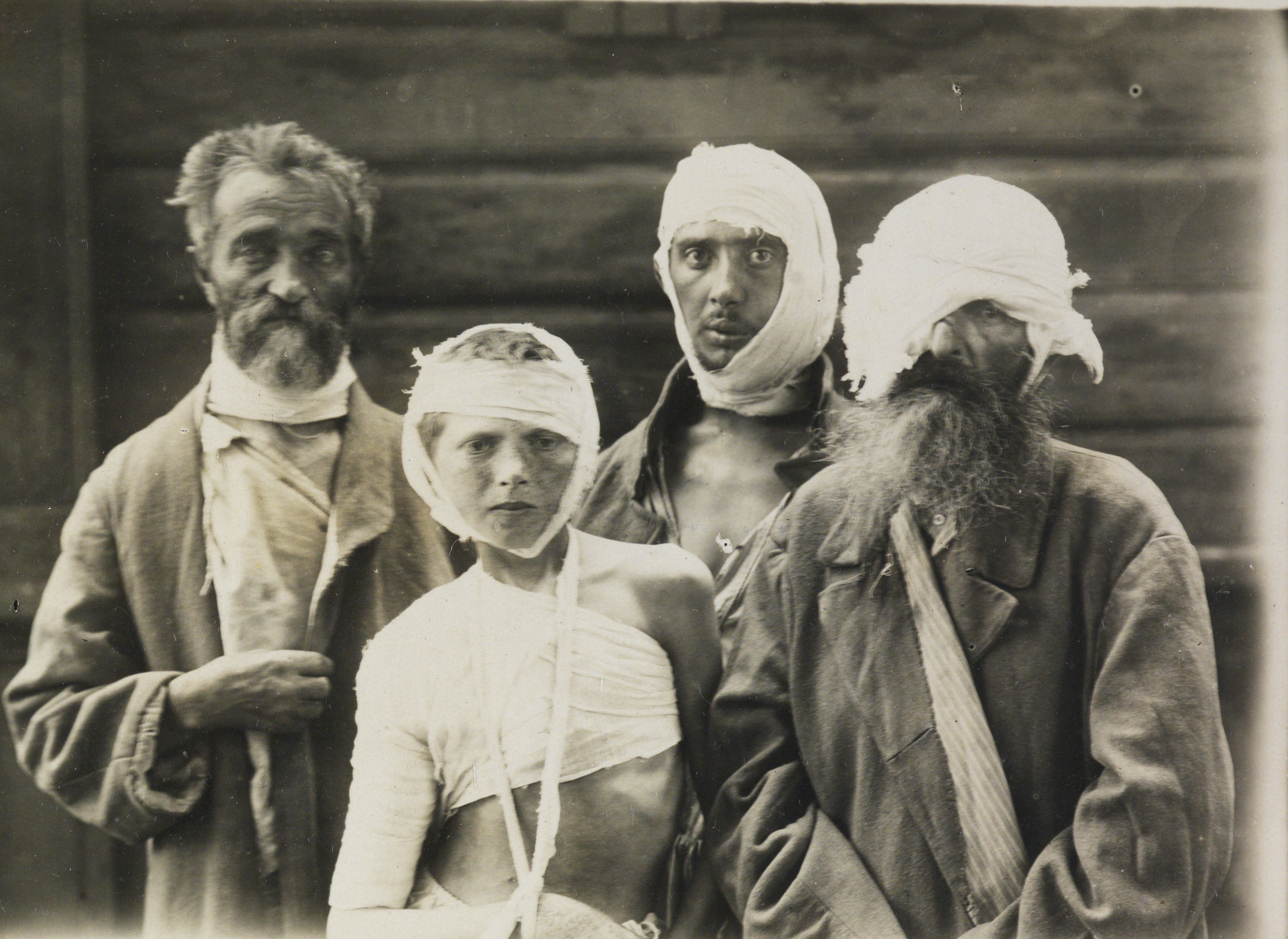
The victims of a pogrom in Khodorkiv (Ходорків), committed by forces subject to the Directorate of Ukraine in 1919. From The Pritzker Family National Photography Collection, National Library of Israel

=== Pogroms across Podolia ===
On 15 February 1919, during the Ukrainian-Soviet war, Otaman Ivan Semesenko initiated a pogrom in Proskurov in which many Jews were massacred on Shabbat (parashah Tesaveh). Semesenko claimed that the pogrom was in retaliation for a previous Bolshevik uprising that he believed was led by Jews.

According to the pinqasim record books those murdered in the pogrom included 390 men, 309 women and 76 children. The number of wounded exceeded 500. Two weeks later Order 131 was published in the central newspaper by the head of Directorate of Ukraine. In it Symon Petliura denounced such actions and eventually executed Otaman Semesenko by firing-squad in 1920. Semesenko's brigade was disarmed and dissolved. This event is especially remarkable because it was used to justify Sholem Schwarzbard's assassination of the Ukrainian leader in 1926. Although Petliura's direct involvement was never proven, Schwartzbard was acquitted in revenge. The series of Jewish pogroms around Ukraine culminated in the Kyiv pogroms of 1919 between June and October of that year.

== Interwar era ==
=== Soviet Ukraine and Crimea ===
==== Jews and Communism ====
Jews were over-represented in the Russian revolutionary leadership. However, most were hostile to Jewish culture and Jewish political parties, and were loyal to the Communist Party's atheism and proletarian internationalism, and committed to stamping out any sign of "Jewish cultural particularism".

==== Demographic developments ====
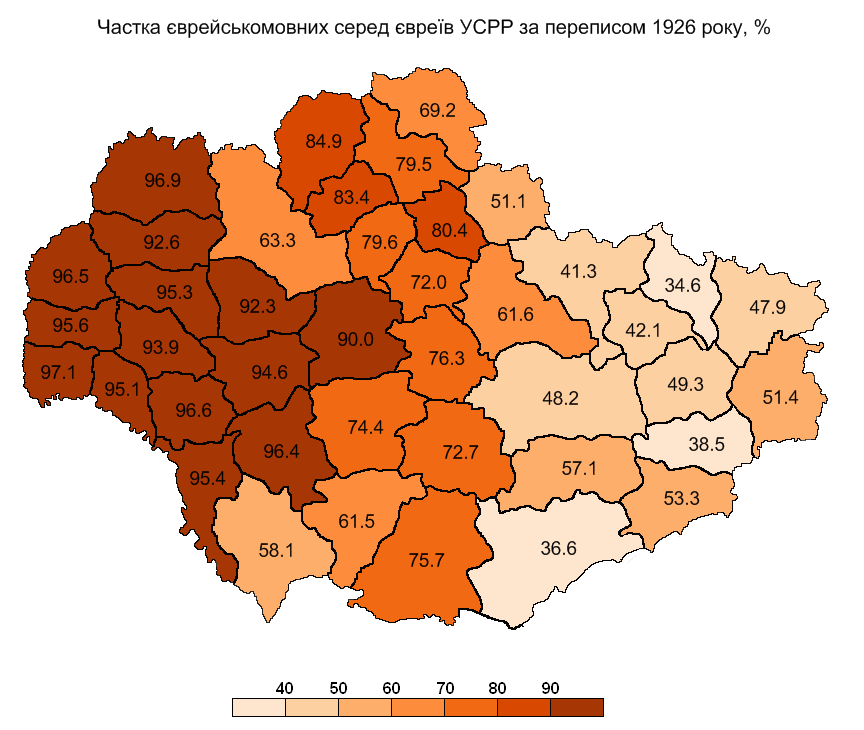
Percentage of native Yiddish speakers among all Jews in the Ukrainian SSR, 1926

The events of World War I and following conflicts led to a new wave of Jewish emigration, mainly to Germany (see Ostjuden). The liquidation of the Pale of Settlement contributed to the movement of Jews to other parts of Eastern Europe, including Eastern Ukraine and Kuban. At the same time, Jewish migration to the United States practically ceased, and migration of rural Jews to bigger cities continued. As a result, between 1897 and 1927 the percentage of Jewish population in Ukrainian lands declined from 8.3 to 5.5%. Right-bank Ukraine saw the biggest decline in Jewish population, meanwhile Sloboda Ukraine, especially Kharkiv, experienced the largest influx of Jews among all regions. By 1926, only 26.2% of Jews in Ukraine lived in villages, a decrease of one-third compared to 1897. As of 1926,the biggest Jewish populations in Soviet Ukraine were concentrated in Odesa (154,000 or 36.5% of the whole population), Kyiv 140,500, 27.3%), Kharkiv (81,500, 19.5%) and Dnipropetrovsk (62,000, 26.7%); in Polish- and Romaniancontrolled lands the biggest Jewish communities existed in Lviv (98,000 or 31.9% as of 1931) and Chernivtsi (42,600 or 37.9%).

According to the 1926 Soviet census, 76% of Jews in Ukrainian SSR declared Yiddish as their native language, with 23% naming Russian and only 1% Ukrainian. Only 16% of Jews couldn't write in Russian, but 31% couldn't write in Yiddish, which demonstrated a trend for assimilation.

==== Consolidation of Soviet power ====
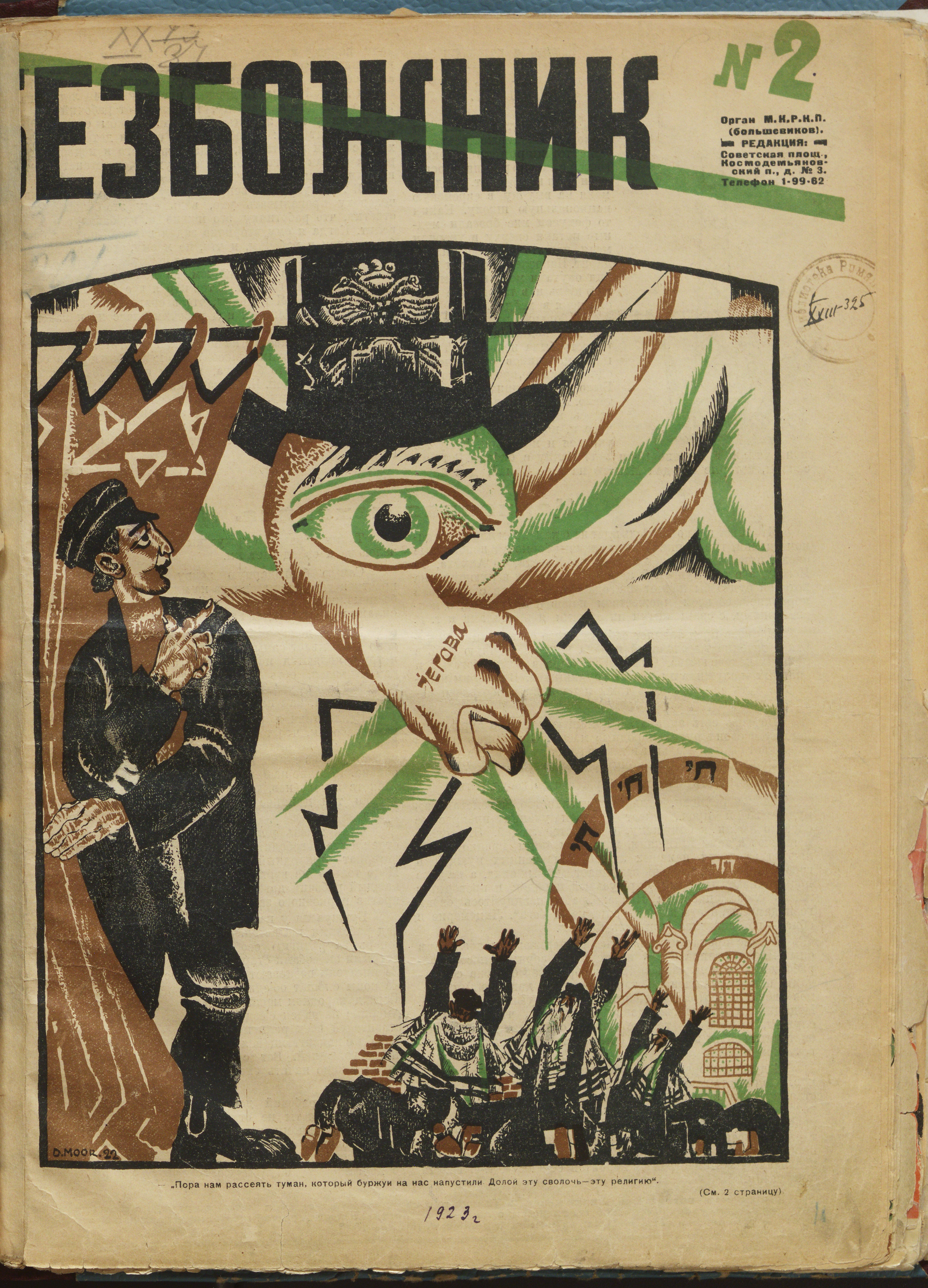
An anti-Judaism caricature in the Soviet Bezbozhnik newspaper, 1923

In Soviet Ukraine Jews were granted formal equality, but their economic base suffered due to the nationalization of economy. Massive Jewish migration into cities led to the rise of Jewish employment on industrial enterprises, in cooperation, as well as in state and party organs. In July 1919, the Central Jewish Commissariat dissolved the kehillot (Jewish Communal Councils), which had provided social services to the Jewish community.

From 1919 to 1920, Jewish parties and Zionist organizations were driven underground as the Communist government sought to abolish all potential opposition. The Yevsektsiya Jewish section of the Soviet Communist party was at the forefront of the anti-religious campaigns of the 1920s that led to the closing of religious institutions, the break-up of religious communities and the further restriction of access to religious education. To that end a series of "community trials" against the Jewish religion were held. The last known such trial, on the subject of circumcision, was held in 1928 in Kharkiv. At the same time, the body worked to establish a secular identity for the Jewish community.

==== Culture and education ====
Between 1920 and 1935 Yiddish functioned as one of official languages in Soviet Ukraine. It served as a language of administration in Jewish districts and village councils, and Jewish press was published by state and party authorities. A Jewish department was active at the Odesa Institute of Popular Education, and in 1929 an Institute for Jewish Culture was established at the All-Ukrainian Academy of Sciences. A museum of Jewish culture was active in Odesa and a Jewish library operated in Kyiv.

As part of korenization policies, compulsory education of Yiddish-speaking pupils was introduced. In 1924 there were 268 schools of this type with 42,000 pupils in Soviet Ukraine; by 1931 their number had grown to 1096, and they were attended by 94,800 pupils. Yiddish schools in the Soviet Union provided children with proficiency in Yiddish culture, but at the same time engaged in propaganda against Judaism: religious instruction was banned by Soviet legislation, and in 1923 Saturday was replaced with Sunday as the day off for Jewish pupils. This made such institutions increasingly unpopular among Jewish families, and after the end of korenization in the mid-1930s the enrollment in Yiddish schools in Soviet Ukraine rapidly declined, although some of them, especially in newly annexed Western Ukraine, continued to function until the Second World War.

Under the Soviet rule state Yiddish theatres were organized in cities such as Kharkiv (1925), Kyiv (1929), Odesa (1930), Vinnytsia (1934), Zhytomyr (1935), as well as Lviv and Ternopil (1939–1940). All of them were closed in the postwar era during the wave of repressions against Jewish culture in the Soviet Union. Works of Soviet Yiddish authors were translated by contemporary Ukrainian authors such as Pavlo Tychyna and Maksym Rylsky. However, during the 1930s Jewish cultural figures suffered from a wave of state persecution, along with their Ukrainian counterparts.

==== Increase of government control ====
On 8 April 1929 the new Law on Religious Associations codified all previous religious legislation. All meetings of religious associations were required to have their agenda approved in advance; lists of members of religious associations had to be provided to the authorities. In 1930 the Yevsektsia was dissolved, leaving no central Soviet-Jewish organization. Although the body had served to undermine Jewish religious life, its dissolution led to the disintegration of Jewish secular life as well; Jewish cultural and educational organizations gradually disappeared. When the Soviet government reintroduced the use of internal passports in 1933, "Jewish" was considered an ethnicity for those purposes.

The Soviet famine of 1932–1933 affected the Jewish population, and led to a migration from shtetls to overcrowded cities.

==== Jewish agricultural settlement ====
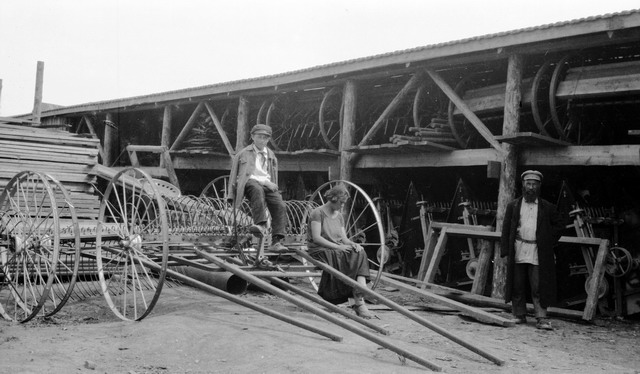
Jewish agricultural settlers in the district of Dzhankoy, Crimea, 1926

During the first years of Soviet rule, authorities promoted mass Jewish agricultural settlement in Southern Ukraine and Crimea, which in 1921 became an autonomous republic. In 1923, the All-Union Central Committee passed a motion to resettle a large number of the Jewish population from Ukrainian and Belarusian cities to Crimea, numbering 570,400 families. The plan to further resettle Jewish families was confirmed by the Central Committee of the USSR on 15 July 1926, assigning 124 million roubles to the task and also receiving 67 million from foreign sources.

The Soviet initiative of Jewish settlement in Crimea was opposed by Symon Petliura, who regarded it as a provocation. This train of thought was supported by Arnold Margolin who stated that it would be dangerous to set up Jewish colonies there.

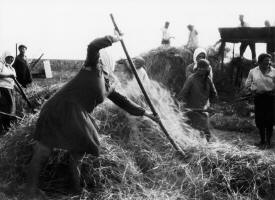
Jewish workers on a collective farm in Ukraine, 1930

The Soviets twice sought to establish Jewish autonomy in Crimea; once, in the 1920s, with the support of the American Jewish Joint Distribution Committee, and again in 1944, by the Jewish Anti-Fascist Committee.

On 31 January 1924 the Commissariat for Nationalities' Affairs was disbanded. On 29 August 1924 an official agency for Jewish resettlement, the Commission for the Settlement of Jewish Toilers on the Land (Komzet), was established. KOMZET studied, managed and funded projects for Jewish resettlement in rural areas. A public organization, the Society for the Agricultural Organization of Working Class Jews in the USSR (OZET), was created in January 1925 to help recruit colonists and support the colonization work of KOMZET. For the first few years the government encouraged Jewish settlements, particularly in Ukraine. Support for the project dwindled throughout the next decade.

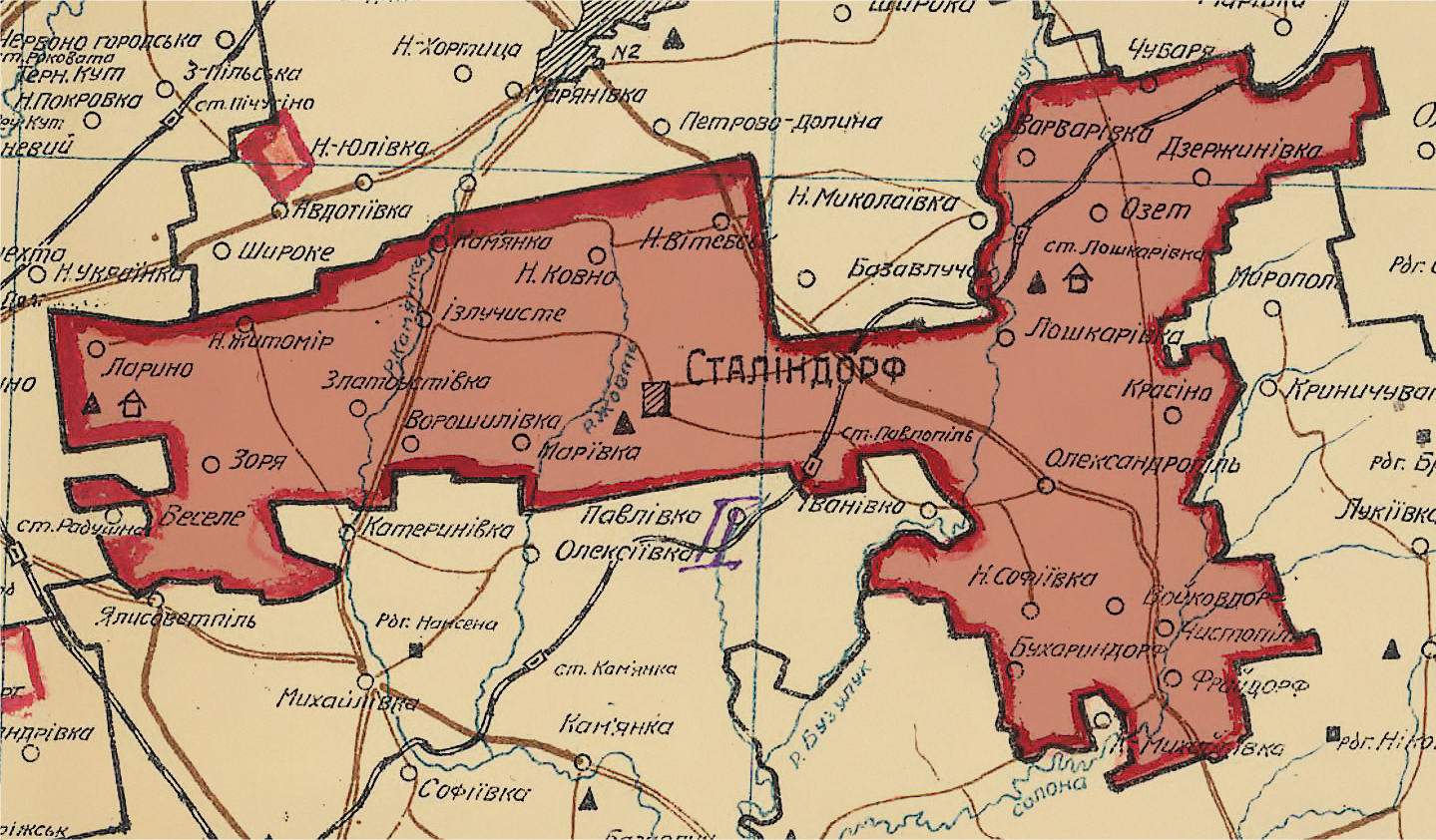
Map of Stalindorf Jewish national district in 1935

As of 1930, 210 Jewish agricultural colonies existed in Ukraine, with 40 being located in Crimea. By 1933, over 80,000 Jews in the republic were active in agriculture. Three Jewish national districts were created in Kalinindorf, Novyi Zlatopil and Stalindorf (near Kryvyi Rih); in 1931 Freidorf Jewish district was established in Northern Crimea. In 1938 OZET was disbanded, following years of declining activity. The Soviets set up three Jewish national raions in Ukraine as well as two in the Crimea – national raions occupied the 3rd level of the Soviet system, but were all disbanded by the end of World War II.

=== Under Polish, Czechoslovak and Romanian rule ===
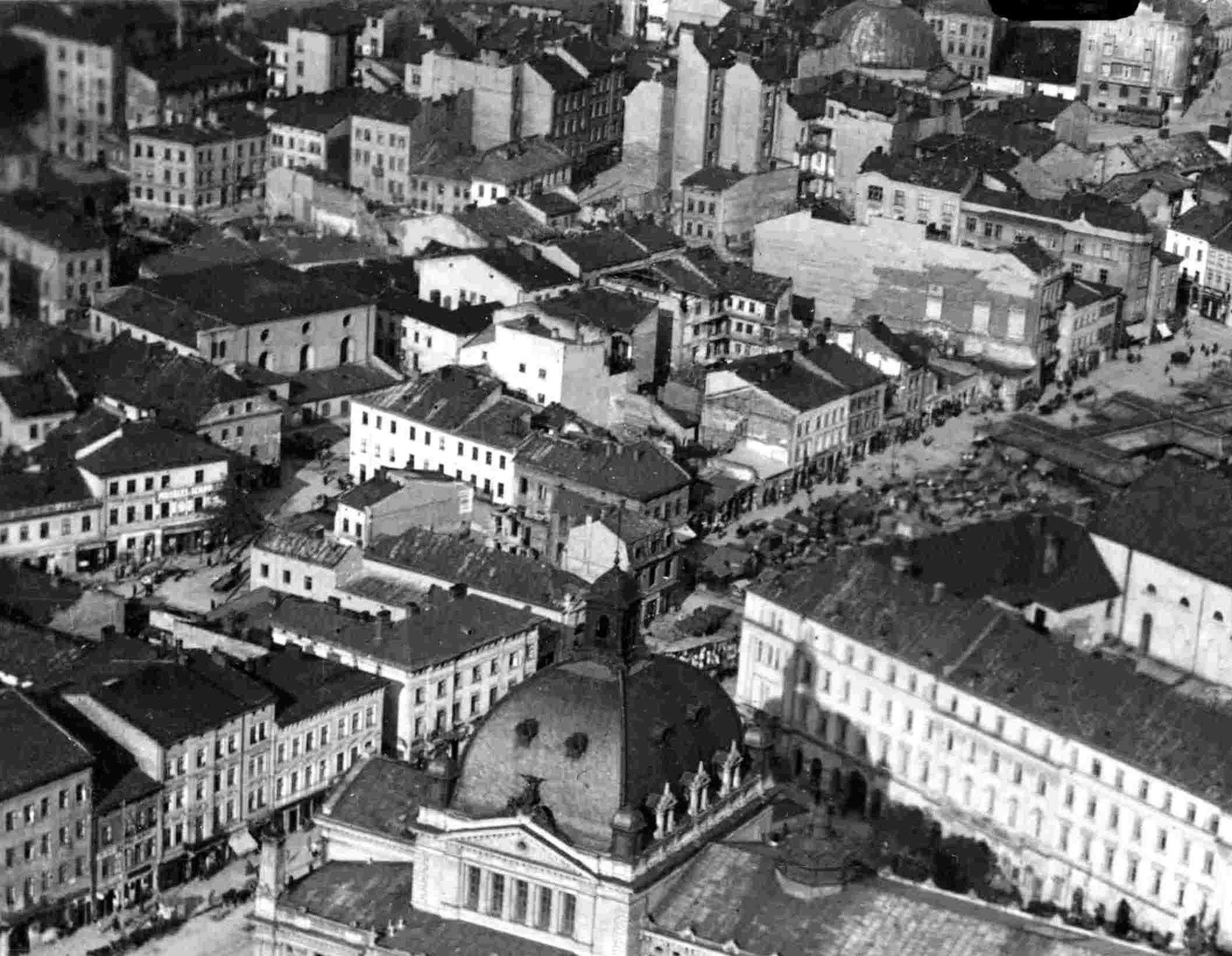
A view of Lviv's Jewish quarter during the 1920s, with a number of synagogues visible

In 1921 many Jews from the former Russian Empire emigrated to Poland, as they were entitled by a peace treaty in Riga to choose the country they preferred. Several hundred thousand joined the already numerous Jewish minority of the Polish Second Republic. Also, during the interwar period, thousands of Jewish refugees from the Soviet Ukraine migrated to Romania.

The situation of Jews in Western Ukrainian lands changed little compared to Austro-Hungarian era. At the same time, local Jews lost their trade monopoly due to competition with cooperatives and private enterprises. In Poland popular attitudes expressed themselves in the emergence of antisemitic groups such as Rozwój. Ukrainian and Jewish minorities cooperated during the 1922 and 1928 elections in Poland as part of the Bloc of National Minorities. Jewish population was generally loyal to national governments controlling the area, including the autonomous state of Carpatho-Ukraine. Between 1920 and 1939 two Jewish gymnasiums were active in Transcarpathia. The Soviet occupation of Western Ukraine produced little change in the situation of local Jews, except from the introduction of nationalization in economy.

== World War II and aftermath ==
=== Soviet occupation of Western Ukraine ===
The Soviet government annexation of territories from Poland, Romania, the incorporation of those areas into the Ukrainian SSR at the beginning of World War II,) as well as the following occupation of Baltic states, led to roughly two million Jews becoming Soviet citizens. Restrictions on Jews that had existed in those countries were lifted. Among repressions and mass deportations of locals who were suspected to be disloyal to the Soviet regime, the fact that some Jews adopted pro-Soviet positions reinforced the popular stereotype about the existence of a "Jewish-Bolshevik" conspiracy, whose goal was allegedly to destroy everything Ukrainian. At the same time, Jewish organizations in the annexed territories were shut down and their leaders were arrested and exiled, and many Jews, especially small tradespeople, were also deported. Approximately 250,000 Jews escaped or were evacuated from the annexed territories to the Soviet interior prior to the Nazi invasion.

=== Holocaust in Ukraine ===
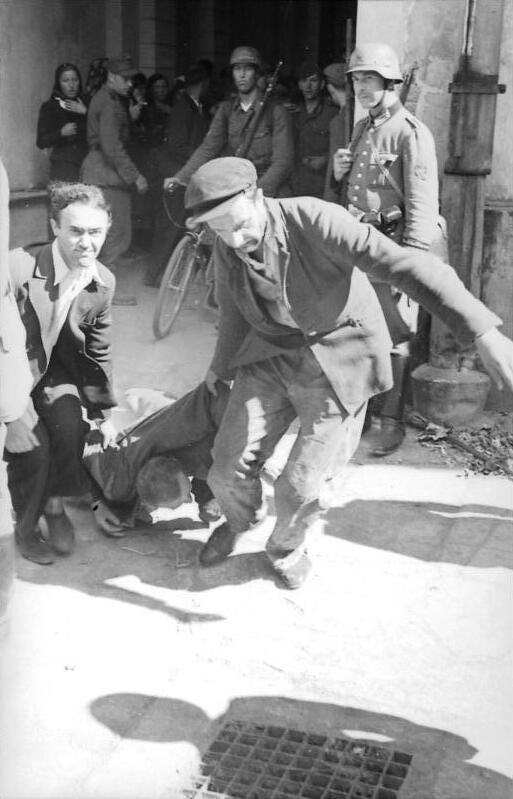
Locals mistreating a Jew under the watch of German soldiers, a scene from the Lviv pogrom of June 1941

During WW2, Nazi ideologists considered Ukrainian lands to be an essential part of Germany's Lebensraum, as a result of which local non-German populations were planned to be assimilated, deported or exterminated. In 1941 Hitler appointed Erich Koch as Reichskommissar of Ukraine, with the task of implementing the "Final Solution", which included physical extermination of Jews living in the territory.

After the start of the German invasion of Soviet Union, many Jews, especially in the eastern part of Ukraine, managed to flee eastward, however those in Western Ukraine were prevented from escaping due to the rapid advance of German troops and Soviet limitations. Nazi authorities employed special task forces (Einsatzgruppen), recruited from members of the SS and Gestapo. Those units followed the German Army and ridded all occupied areas of "undesired elements", including Communists, Polish intelligentsia and Jews. In their actions, the Germans were helped by parts of the local population, especially after rumours about the alleged participation of "Jewish Bolsheviks" in massacres of Ukrainian political prisoners by Soviet authorities began to circulate. As a consequence, pogroms started in German-occupied areas, most prominently in Lviv, where about 4,000 Jews were massacred by German task forces with the assistance of Ukrainian Auxiliary Police. In total, an estimated 24,000 Jews perished in pogroms throughout Eastern Galicia and Volhynia during July and August 1941.

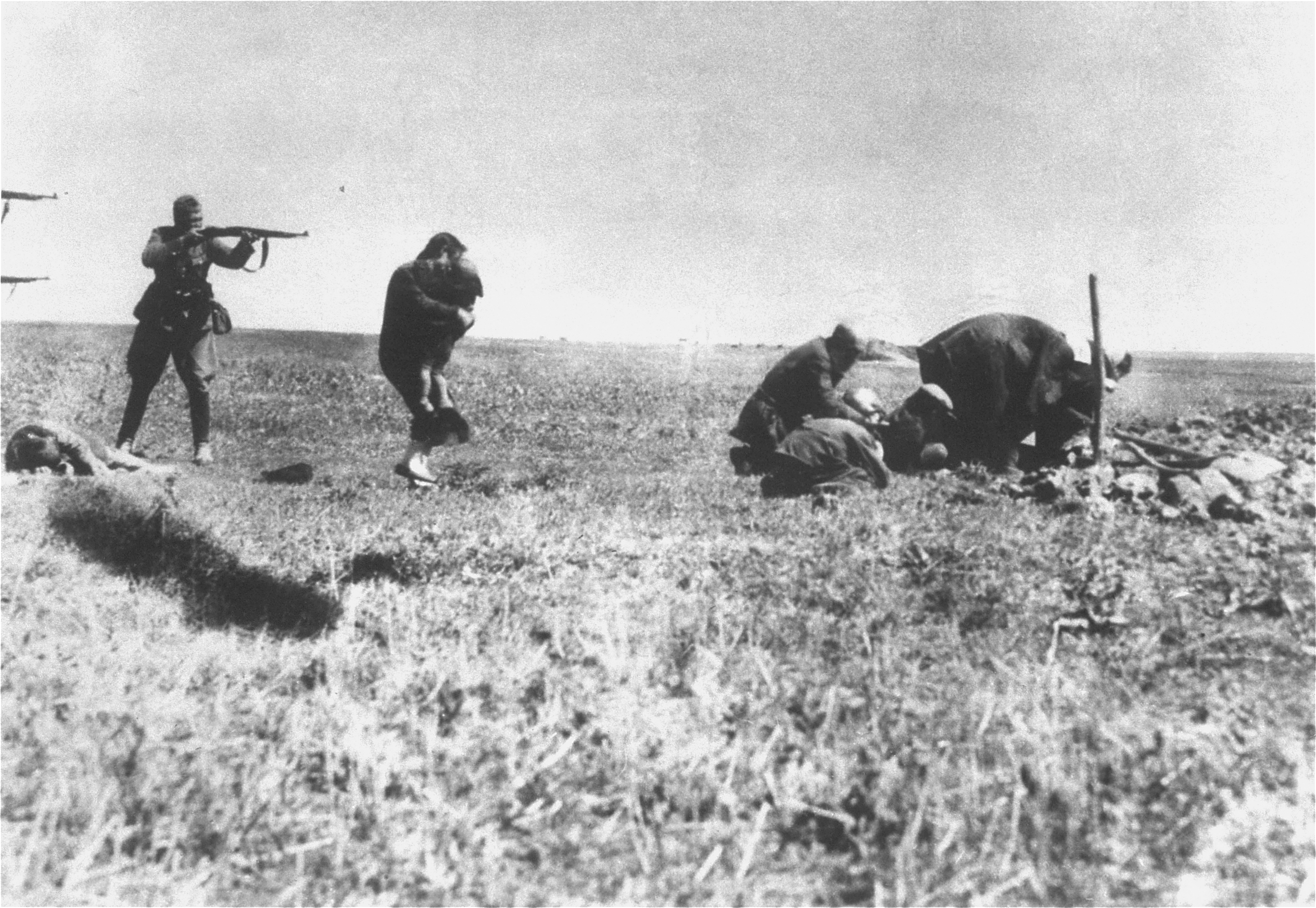
Einsatzgruppe members shooting Jews in Ivanhorod, Ukraine, 1942

Following the entry of Nazi troops to Western Ukraine, the new regime introduced discriminatory measures against the local Jewish population, establishing ghettos and forcing Jews to wear signs of distinction. The simultaneous Romanian occupation in the south led to the creation of first concentration camps for Jews in Ukrainian territory. Mass extermination of Jews under Axis occupation started in autumn 1941, with the massacre of Babyn Yar alone resulting in tens of thousands of deaths, and continued until 1943. Many Jews from Western Ukraine were deported to extermination camps in Poland and Germany. By 1943, most of the region's Jewish population had been eliminated through deportation to death camps such as Auschwitz, Bełżec, Majdanek, Sobibor and Treblinka. In Odessa, 26,000 Jews were killed by Romanian forces, which captured the city from the Soviets in October 1941.

The Nazi administration strove to employ local Ukrainians, Russians, Poles, Germans and even other Jews (see Judenrat) in the facilitation and implementation of their genocidal policies. Part of the Ukrainian population collaborated with the occupiers in their genocidal actions, but many others tried to help and rescue the Jewish victims. A separate pastoral letter condemning the murders was issued by Ukrainian Greek Catholic metropolitan Andrey Sheptytsky, who personally saved many Jews by providing them refuge in monasteries. Several Jewish doctors are known to have been employed in the ranks of the Ukrainian Insurgent Army between 1943 and 1945.

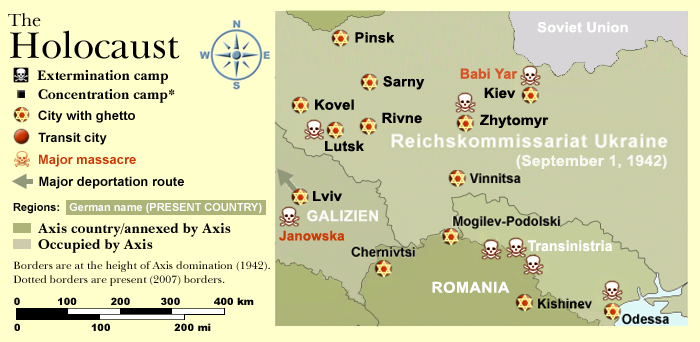
A map of the Holocaust in Ukraine

The total number of civilians who died during the war and the German occupation of Ukraine is estimated to be as high as seven million. This estimate includes over one million Jews who were shot and killed by the Einsatzgruppen and local Ukrainian collaborators. The excuse of "Jewish Bolshevism" was also used to carry them out. The total number of Jews killed in the Holocaust in Eastern Ukraine, or the Ukrainian SSR (within its 1938 borders), is estimated to be slightly less than 700,000 out of a total pre-Holocaust Jewish population of slightly over 1.5 million. Within the borders of modern Ukraine, the death toll is estimated to be around 900,000.

The Holocaust virtually eliminated the Jewish population in Western Ukraine, and put an end to the centuries-old Yiddish and Hebrew cultural traditions in the country. The participation of Ukrainian collaborators in many of the Nazi crimes also had a detrimental effect on Ukrainian–Jewish relations, and led to the emergence of a popular mass media stereotype of Ukrainians being antisemitic by nature, which became particularly widespread in Israel and North America.

=== Post-war situation ===
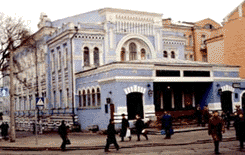
Brodsky Synagogue in Kyiv during the 1970s, when the building served as a puppet theatre

Following the end of the war, surviving Jews and returning evacuees who stayed in Ukraine found themselves in a situation which was different from the prewar experience. The official policy of the Soviet government adopted assimilationist views, with none of the previously existing Jewish administrative entities being restored, and Jewish cultural and religious life was increasingly suppressed. In the first postwar years, many Jewish activists were accused of "bourgeois nationalism" and "cosmopolitanism", and government media adopted antisemitic mottos under the guise of anti-Zionist and anti-Israel propaganda. The general decline of Eastern European Jewry coincided with the establishment of the State of Israel, whose political elite was to a large degree represented by natives of Ukraine, including one of its presidents Yitzhak Ben-Zvi.

With the Stalinist regime increasingly adopting militant nationalist positions, starting from the latter years of the war, a massive political purge against Jews working in the party and state apparatus, armed forces, police and higher education began. In 1948, the Jewish Anti-Fascist Committee was disbanded, and Jewish intelligentsia became a victim of persecution by authorities. Between 1950 and 1952 numerous prominent activists of Jewish ethnicity in Ukraine were liquidated by Soviet authorities, while the rest were forced to adopt Russian or Ukrainian culture and language to continue their activities. In early 1953, the so-called "Doctors' Plot" was fabricated by Stalin and his circle with the aim of turning the public opinion against Jews. The final goal of the campaign was likely the deportation of all Soviet Jews to the Jewish Autonomous Oblast in the Far East to realise the government's "Birobidzhan project", which had been started during the 1930s.

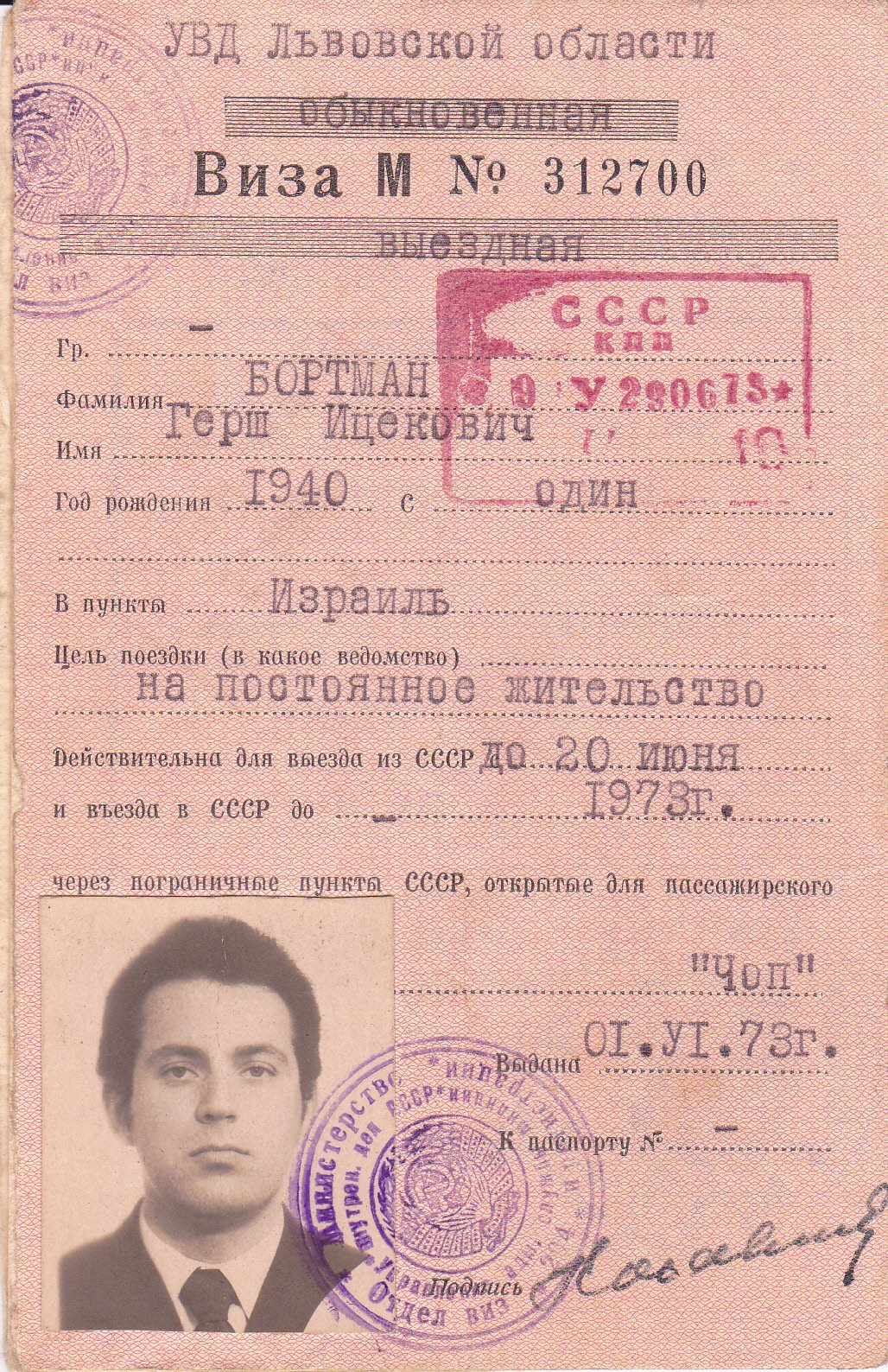
A Soviet exit visa from 1973 permitting a Jew from Lviv Oblast emigration to Israel

At the 20th Party Congress, Stalin's policies were criticized by his successor Nikita Khrushchev, but no condemnation of state antisemitism was issued. Under Khrushchev's tenure, persecution of Jews continued under the guise of combat against economic crimes. Along with attacks on Zionism, the government-owned press started a campaign of criticism against Judaism, and the Academy of Sciences of Ukrainian SSR became known for publishing the book Judaism Without Embellishment authored by T. Kychko, which contained openly antisemitic caricatures. Such expression of open racism by supposedly internationalist Soviet authorities produced a shock wave around the world.

Ukraine had 840,000 Jews in 1959, a decrease of almost 70% from 1941 (within Ukraine's current borders). As a result of growing financial, technical and food dependence of the Soviet Union on the Western World, its authorities were eventually forced to provide a number of concessions to the Jewish population, particularly in respect to the right of emigration. Most emigrants were able to leave USSR under the pretense of family reunification. As a result, Ukraine's Jewish population declined significantly during the Cold War, and by 1989 was only slightly more than half of what it had been in 1959. The biggest Jewish populations at the time were concentrated in Kyiv, Kharkiv, Odesa, Lviv, Chernivtsi, Transcarpathia and Bukovyna.

Among Jewish emigrants who left Ukraine during Soviet times were artists Marina Maximilian Blumin and Klone, as well as activists including Gennady Riger and Lia Shemtov.

== Independent Ukraine ==
Historical Ukrainian Jewish population
Year	Pop.	±%
1650	40,000	—
1765	300,000	+650.0%
1897	2,680,000	+793.3%
1926	2,720,000	+1.5%
1941	2,700,000	−0.7%
1959	840,446	−68.9%
1970	777,406	−7.5%
1979	634,420	−18.4%
1989	487,555	−23.1%
2001	106,600	−78.1%
2010	71,500	−32.9%
2014	67,000	−6.3%
2023	45,000	−32.8%
Source: * The Jewish population data includes Mountain Jews, Georgian Jews, Bukharan Jews (or Central Asian Jews), Krymchaks (all per the 1959 Soviet census), and Tats.: People with at least some Jewish ancestry: 360,000–400,000 (2014)

=== Emigration ===
In 1989, a Soviet census counted 487,000 Jews living in Ukraine. Although discrimination by the state all but halted after Ukrainian independence in 1991, Jews were still discriminated against during the 1990s. For instance, Jews were not allowed to attend some educational institutions. Antisemitism has since declined.

The overwhelming majority of the Jews who remained in Ukraine in 1989 then moved to other countries in the 1990s during and after the collapse of Communism.

Some 266,300 Ukrainian Jews emigrated to Israel in the 1990s. The 2001 Ukrainian Census counted 106,600 Jews living in Ukraine (the number of Jews also dropped due to a negative birthrate). According to the Public Diplomacy and Diaspora Affairs Minister of Israel, early 2012 there were 250,000 Jews in Ukraine, half of them living in Kyiv. According to the European Jewish Congress, as of 2014, 360,000–400,000 Jews remained.

=== Jewish life and organizations in independent Ukraine ===
By 1999 there were various Ukrainian Jewish organizations that disputed each other's legitimacy.

In November 2007, an estimated 700 Torah scrolls confiscated from Jewish communities during the Soviet era were returned to Jewish communes by state authorities.

The Ukrainian Jewish Committee was established in 2008 in Kyiv to concentrate the efforts of Jewish leaders in Ukraine on resolving the community's strategic problems and addressing socially significant issues. The Committee declared its intention to become one of the world's most influential organizations protecting the rights of Jews and "the most important and powerful structure protecting human rights in Ukraine".

=== Rise of far-right sympathies and Jewish reaction ===
In the 2012 Ukrainian parliamentary elections, All-Ukrainian Union "Svoboda" won its first seats in the Ukrainian Parliament, garnering 10.44% of the popular vote and the fourth most seats among national political parties; This led to concern among Jewish organizations that accused "Svoboda" of Nazi sympathies and antisemitism. In May 2013, the World Jewish Congress listed the party as neo-Nazi. "Svoboda" has denied the charges.

Antisemitic graffiti and violence against Jews were still a problem in 2010.

=== Revolution of 2014 and start of Russo-Ukrainian war ===
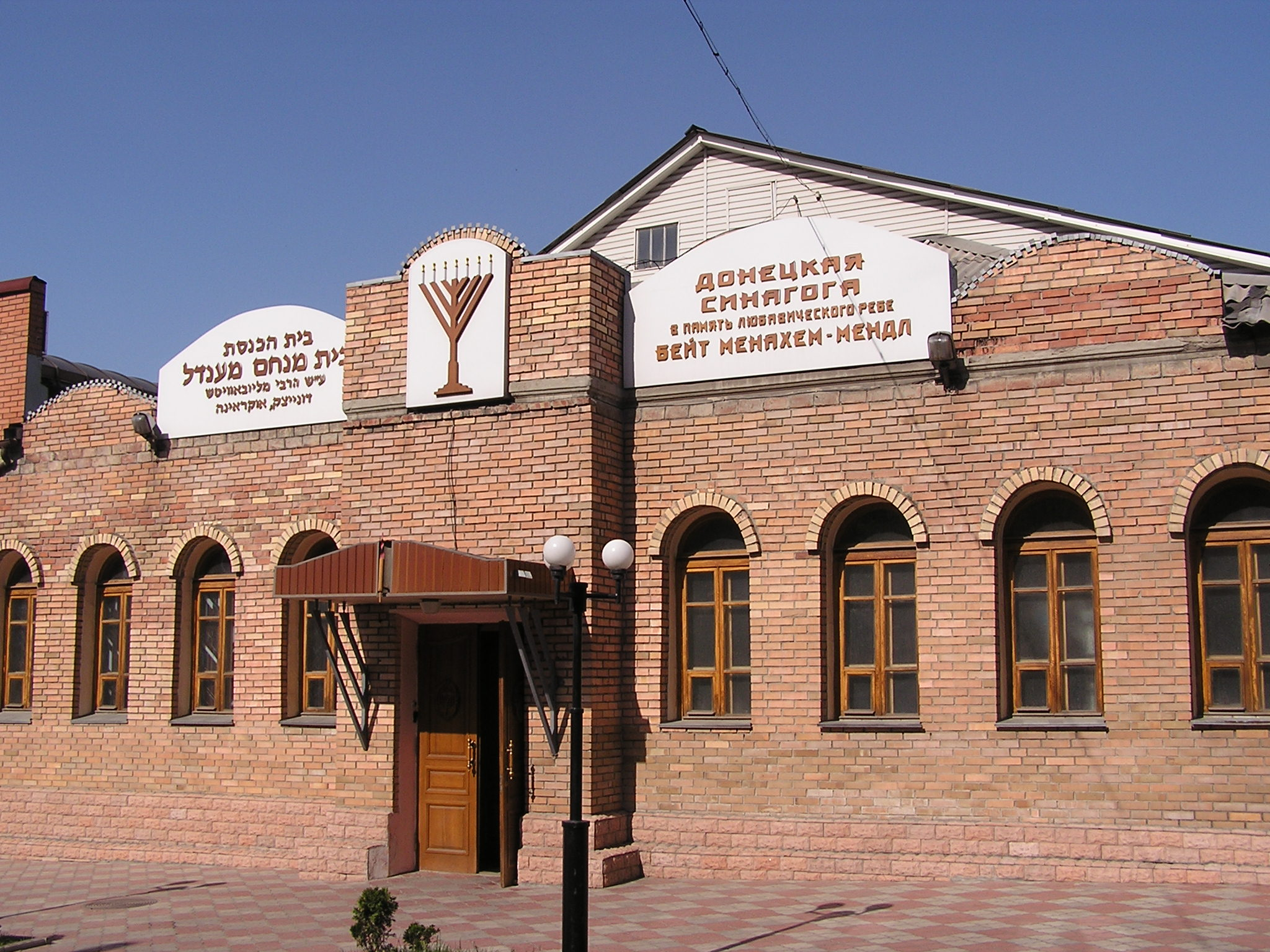
Building of the Donetsk synagogue, where a provocation against the Jewish community was organized in 2014

After the Euromaidan protests, unrest gripped southern and eastern Ukraine, and this escalated in April 2014 into the war in Donbas and the 2022 Russian invasion of Ukraine.

In April 2014, in the city of Donetsk occupied by Russian-backed forces, leaflets were distributed by three masked men as people left a synagogue, ordering Jews to register to avoid losing their property and citizenship "given that the leaders of the Jewish community of Ukraine support the Banderite junta in Kyiv (Note: Apparently referring to the support of the Euromaidan protests (that ousted president Viktor Yanukovich) by prominent Jews in Ukraine.) and are hostile to the Orthodox Donetsk Republic and its citizens". After the distribution of the flyers was reported, Denis Pushilin, whom the leaflets claimed had issued the discriminatory order, denied any involvement on behalf of himself and the government of the Donetsk People's Republic. The chief rabbi of the city of Donetsk, Pinchas Vishedski, later called the distribution of the flyers a "hoax" that was carried out by an unknown party, adding "I think it's someone trying to use the Jewish community in Donetsk as an instrument in this conflict. That's why we're upset."

After the Euromaidan, the number of Ukrainian Jews making aliyah from Ukraine grew 142% during the first four months of 2014 compared to the previous year. 800 people arrived in Israel over January–April, and over 200 signed up for May 2014. However, chief rabbi and Chabad emissary of Kyiv Rabbi Jonathan Markovitch said in late April 2014 "Today, you can come to Kyiv, Dnipro or Odesa and walk through the streets openly dressed as a Jew, with nothing to be afraid of".

In August 2014, the Jewish Telegraphic Agency reported that the International Fellowship of Christians and Jews was organizing chartered flights to allow at least 150 Ukrainian Jews to immigrate to Israel in September. Jewish organizations within Ukraine, as well as the American Jewish Joint Distribution Committee, the Jewish Agency for Israel and the Jewish community of Dnipropetrovsk, arranged temporary homes and shelters for hundreds of Jews who fled the war in Donbas in eastern Ukraine. Hundreds of Jews reportedly fled the cities of Luhansk and Donetsk.

In 2014 Ihor Kolomoyskyi and Volodymyr Groysman were appointed Governor of Dnipropetrovsk Oblast and Speaker of the Parliament respectively. Groysman became Prime Minister of Ukraine in April 2016.

=== Presidency of Volodymyr Zelenskyy ===
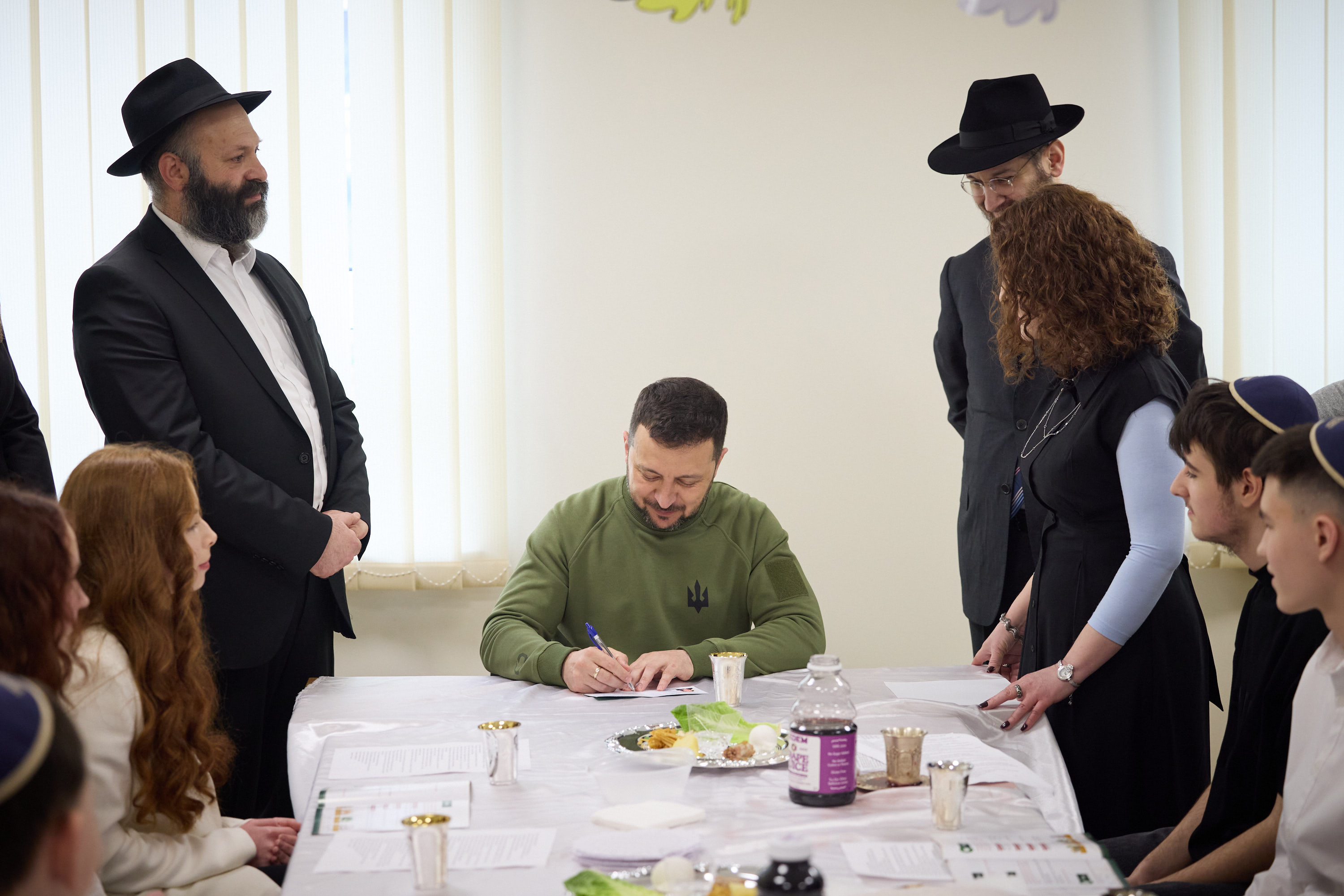
Volodymyr Zelenskyy meeting with the leaders of Ukraine's Jewish community before Passover, 2024

Ukraine elected its first Jewish president in the 2019 presidential election, when comedian, head of Kvartal 95 Studio, and lead actor in the TV series Servant of the People Volodymyr Zelenskyy defeated incumbent Petro Poroshenko with 73.23% of the vote, the biggest landslide victory in the history of Ukrainian presidential elections. During the brief overlap of Zelenskyy's and Groysman's terms (20 May to 29 August 2019), Ukraine was the only country in the world apart from Israel to have both a Jewish president and prime minister.

=== 2022 Russian invasion ===
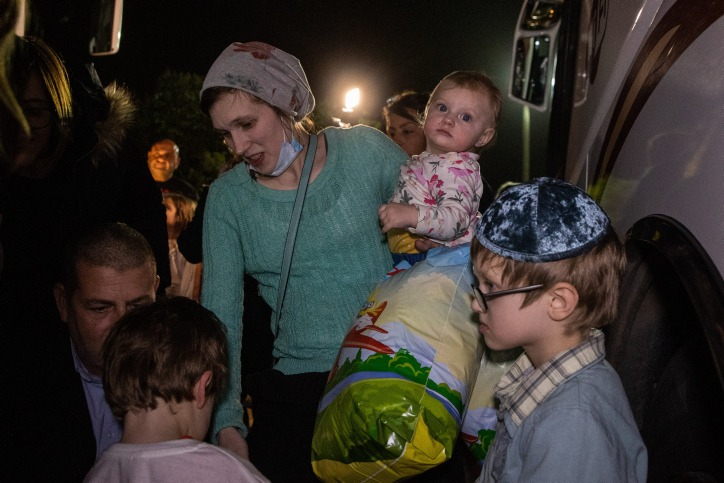
A Ukrainian Jewish family arrives in Israel on 6 March 2022

In February 2022 Russia invaded Ukraine. The Israeli Embassy stayed open on the Sabbath to facilitate the evacuation of Jews. A total of 97 Jews chose to travel to Israel. In addition, 140 Jewish orphans fled to Romania and Moldova. 100 Jews fled to Belarus to prepare for their eventual move to Israel. On 2 March 2022, the Jewish Agency for Israel reported that hundreds of Jewish war refugees sheltering in Poland, Romania and Moldova were scheduled to leave for Israel the following week. Refugee estimates ranged from 10,000 to 15,200 refugees had arrived in Israel. In September 2023 it was reported that over 43,000 Jews from Russia and over 15,000 Jews from Ukraine have fled to Israel. By August 2024, out of an estimated 30,000 Jews who immigrated to Israel since 7 October 2023, 17,000 Jews were from Russia and 900 Jews from Ukraine.

In 2023, the first Ukrainian-language haggadah was released; most printed religious material used by Ukrainian Jews until then had been in Russian. The new haggadah included material such as prayers for those defending Ukraine, as well as sections on Jewish writers from today's Ukraine who had been classified as Russian in the past.

In December 2024, chief of the Main Directorate of Intelligence of Ukraine Kyrylo Budanov ceremonially lit the first candle on a Hanukkiah made from fragments of Russian drones and rockets fired at Ukraine.

On 8 June 2025, the Federation of Jewish Communities of Ukraine announced that at least 200 Jewish-Ukrainian soldiers had been killed during the Russian invasion.

== Jewish communities in modern Ukraine ==
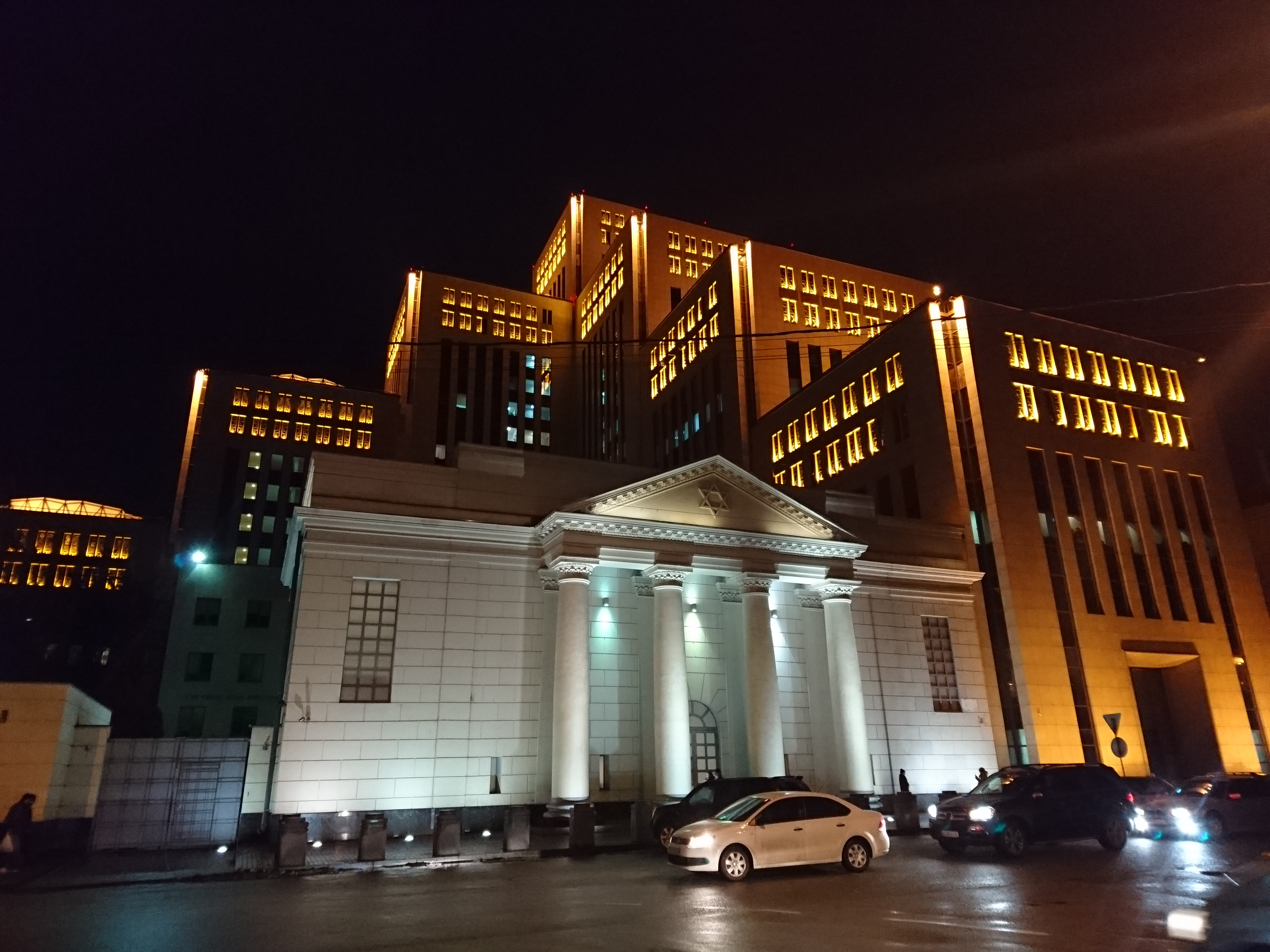
Building of the Menorah centre in Dnipro – Ukraine's biggest Jewish community institution

As of 2012, Ukraine had the fifth-largest Jewish community in Europe and the twelfth-largest in the world, behind South Africa and ahead of Mexico. The majority live in Kyiv (about half), Dnipro, Kharkiv and Odesa. Rabbis Jonathan Markovitch of Kyiv and Shmuel Kaminetsky of Dnipro are considered to be among the most influential foreigners in the country. Opened in October 2012 in Dnipro, the multifunctional Menorah center is among the world's largest Jewish community centers.

A growing trend among Israelis is to visit Ukraine on a "roots trip" to learn of Jewish life there. Kyiv is usually mentioned, where it is possible to trace the paths of Sholem Aleichem and Golda Meir; Zhytomyr and Korostyshiv, where one can follow the steps of Haim Nahman Bialik; Berdychiv, where one can trace the life of Mendele Mocher Sforim; Rivne, where one can follow the course of Amos Oz; Buchach – the path of S.Y. Agnon; Drohobych – the place of Maurycy Gottlieb and Bruno Schulz.

Ukraine is known as a major exporter of handmade matzah to the United States.

== Institutions dedicated to Jewish history and culture ==
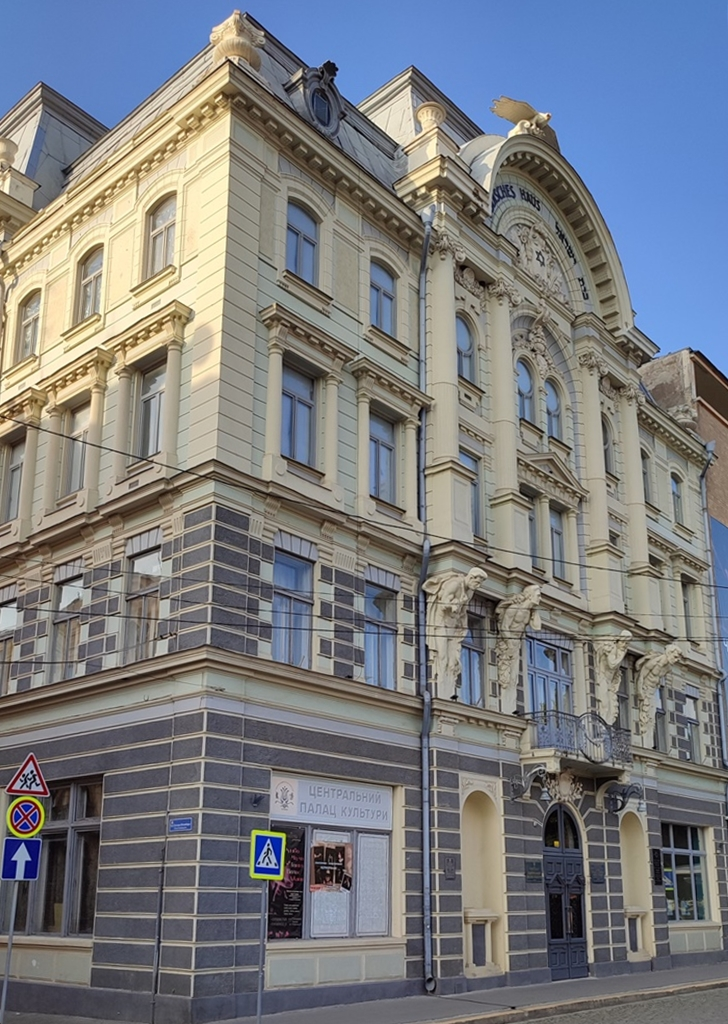
Jewish People's House in Chernivtsi, where the History and Culture Museum of Bukovinian Jews is located

- Faina Petryakova Scientific Centre of Judaica and Jewish Art, Lviv (established 2005)
- History and Culture Museum of Bukovinian Jews, Chernivtsi (opened 2008)
- Holocaust Museum in Odesa (opened 2009)
- Jakob Glanzer Shul, Lviv (synagogue complex functions as a Jewish cultural centre since 1991)
- Menorah Center, Dnipro (opened 2012, includes the Museum "Jewish Memory and the Holocaust in Ukraine")
- Museum of the History of Odesa Jews (established 2002)
- Osher Shvartsman Library, Kyiv (established 1972)
- Sholem Aleichem Lviv Society of Jewish Culture (established 1988)
- Sholem Aleichem Museum (Kyiv), Kyiv (opened 2009)
- Sholem Aleichem Museum (Pereiaslav), Pereiaslav (opened 1978)
- Vinnytsia Museum of Jewish Life, Vinnytsia (opened 2008)
- Virtual Museum of Jewish Culture and History of Ukraine

== See also ==
- List of Ukrainian Jews
  - Category:People of Ukrainian-Jewish descent
- Galician Jews
  - List of Galician Jews
  - Jewish–Ukrainian relations in Eastern Galicia
- History of the Jews in Carpathian Ruthenia
- History of the Jews in Europe
- History of the Jews in Kyiv
- History of the Jews in Kharkiv
- History of the Jews in Lithuania
- History of the Jews in Poland
  - List of Polish Jews
- History of the Jews in Russia
- History of the Jews in the Soviet Union
- Israel–Lithuania relations
- Israel–Poland relations
- Israel–Russia relations
- Soviet Union and the Arab–Israeli conflict
- Israel–Ukraine relations
- Janowska concentration camp
- Jewish Roots in Ukraine and Moldova (book)
- Jewish Anti-Fascist Committee
- Jewish gauchos
- Lithuanian Jews
- Lwów Ghetto
- Lwów Uprising
- Wooden synagogue
- Yerusalimka
- List of synagogues in Ukraine
- Chief Rabbi of Ukraine
