= Ivan Semesenko =

Ukrainian military leader and war criminal

Ivan Semosenko
- Іва́н Семесе́нко
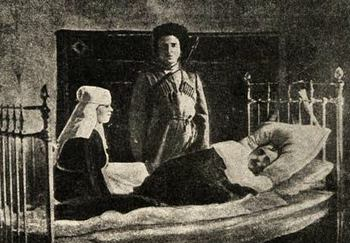
- Semesenko laying down in Proskurov hospital
- Born: 1894; Russian Empire
- Died: 1920 (aged 25-26); Ukrainian People's Republic
- Cause of death: Execution by firing squad
- Known for: Pogroms during the Russian Civil War

Ivan Semesenko (Ukrainian: Іва́н Семесе́нко; 1894–1920) was a Ukrainian military leader and a war criminal who was involved in anti-Jewish pogroms in Ukraine, including the Proskurov pogrom.

Before joining the Ukrainian Army, Semesenko served in the Russian Imperial Army, holding a rank of praporshchik. In 1917 he joined the newly formed Ukrainian detachment of the Russian Republic, the 2nd Ukrainian Cossack Regiment of Hetman Polubotok. In November 1918, in Lubny, he gathered a guerrilla detachment in a fight against the Hetman administration. In January 1919 his detachment moved to Right-bank Ukraine, where it was transformed in the "Zaporizhian Brigade named after Symon Petlura" which consisted of two kurins (battalions). After suffering a defeat at frontlines in March 1919, remnants of the brigade in May 1919 were transferred to the Zaporizhian Corpus of the Standing Army of the Ukrainian People's Republic (Ukrainian People's Army).

On 1 May 1919, Semesenko was arrested and was under investigation on charges of organizing Jewish pogroms. In October 1919 he was freed from jail in Kamianets-Podilskyi by military detachments of the Armed Forces of South Russia that occupied the city.

On 17 January 1920, Semesenko was a military commissar and commander of the Red Insurgent Forces of Bratslav County. In April 1920 he joined the 2nd Division (later the 3rd Iron Division) of Ukrainian People's Army, but soon it was discovered that he was under investigation. After his attempt to flee, Semesenko was arrested by the Polish police at the Czechoslovak border and handed over to the Ukrainian authorities. He was then executed, albeit the charges for which he was shot are disputed. At the time, it was claimed that Semesenko was executed on charges of organizing Jewish pogroms. However, some assert that he was arrested and shot for dissent against Symon Petliura and mention a version that he died of syphilis.

== See also ==
- Proskurov pogrom
