= Proskurov pogrom =

1919 massacre of Jews at Proskurov, Ukraine

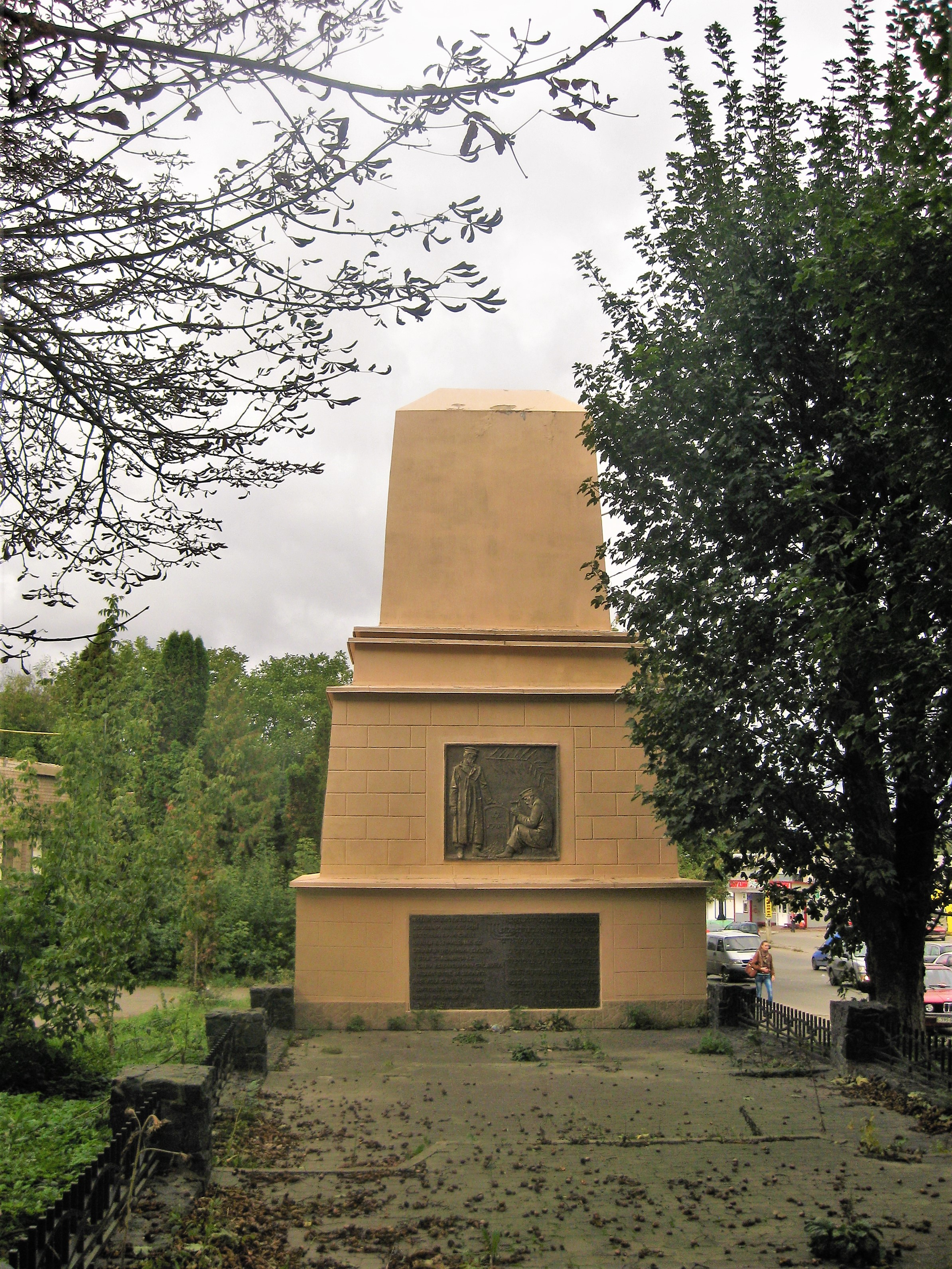
Monument to victims of Proskurov pogrom in Khmelnytskyi

The Proskurov pogrom took place on February 15, 1919, in the town of Proskurov (Ukrainian: Проскурів, Proskuriv; now Khmelnytskyi) during the Ukrainian War of Independence, In mere three and a half hours at least 1,500 Jews were murdered, up to 1,700 by other estimates, and more than 1,000 wounded including women, children and the elderly. The massacre was carried out by Ukrainian People's Republic soldiers of Ivan Semesenko. They were ordered to save the ammunition in the process and use only lances and bayonets.

== History ==
The pogrom was initiated by Ivan Semesenko following a failed Bolshevik uprising against the Ukrainian People's Republic in the city. According to K. Lysiuk, a Ukrainian counterintelligence agent, who was detached to the military command in Proskuriv during the pogrom, information about a planned pro-Bolshevik uprising in the city started spreading in January 1919. It was suspected that Jews were among Bolshevik agents sent to stir the revolt, and soon the whole Jewish community of Proskuriv became suspects in eyes of local authorities and general population. Several episodes of shooting took place in Proskuriv during the end of January and early February, for which Jews were blamed.

Amid the tense atmosphere, Semesenko, who was the commander (otaman) of the Ukrainian garrison stationed in Proskuriv, issued a declaration claiming the Jews to be "hated by all people" and warning them of "misbehaviour". After Ukrainian patrols claimed to have found arms in a number of Jewish homes, which had supposedly been stored in advance for a future pro-Bolshevik uprising, Semesenko reportedly issued an order to his troops, commanding them to kill those Jews who were implicated of taking part in the planned revolt. Lysiuk claimed, that children were to be excluded from the list of people to be eliminated, however later investigation failed to confirm that this supposed order had been followed.

According to historians Yonah Alexander and Kenneth Myers the soldiers marched into the centre of town accompanied by a military band and engaged in atrocities under the slogan: "Kill the Jews and save Ukraine." The estimates of the number of victims ranged between 200 and 300 (claimed by Lysiuk) up to 1500 people. The murders stopped only after "Galician" troops of the Ukrainian army (most likely Sich Riflemen), known for their higher level of discipline and general opposition to pogroms, entered Proskuriv.

One witness writing of the violence said "It is impossible to image what happened here on Saturday, February 15, 1919. This was not a pogrom. It was like the Armenian slaughter." A few days later, the Red Cross representative in Proskuriv reportedly witnessed Semesenko's verbal report to Symon Petliura, admitting to killing 4,000 Jews, which nevertheless remained unconfirmed. Semesenko was executed in 1920. At the time, it was claimed that he had been sentenced to death by Ukrainian authorities for organizing pogroms. However, modern historians concluded that he was instead shot for dissent against Petliura.

== Legacy ==
As a result of the pogrom in Proskuriv, the international image of Ukraine suffered during a crucial moment in the country's struggle for independence. Banks of most European countries, with the exception of Germany, froze accounts owned by the Ukrainian government, and military supplies for the Ukrainian army were arrested. As a reaction to the massacre, the Jewish community of the United States demanded from president Woodrow Wilson to break all diplomatic relations with the Ukrainian People's Republic.

The mention of the pogrom was brought up during the Schwartzbard's trial in Paris, France. Reportedly, the evidential proof of an order by Ukrainian People's Republic head Symon Petliura himself was discussed during the proceedings. The actual cable was said to have been burned by a Jew fearing death. According to Canadian historian Henry Abramson the cable is probably a forgery, and Petliura himself was known to openly condemn pogroms.

The town of Proskuriv renamed Khmelnytskyi in 1954 during the Stalinist era, in spite of the fact that Bohdan Khmelnytsky himself committed a terrible pogrom there against the Jews already in the 17th century.

== Notes ==
=== Sources ===
- Bemporad, Elissa (2019). Legacy of Blood: Jews, Pogroms and Ritual Murder in the Lands of the Soviets. New York: Oxford University Press. p. 4. ISBN 978-0-19-046648-0.
