= Yerusalimka =

Jewish quarter in Vinnytsia, Ukraine

Jewish quarter of Vinnytsia.

Yerusalimka or Ierusalimka (Ukrainian: Єрусалимка), the name derived from Jerusalem, was a Jewish quarter of the town of Vinnytsia in west-central Ukraine. In the beginning of the 20th century Vinnytsia, the chief town of Podolia Governorate, was inhabited by 4,000 people, half of which were Jewish. Ierusalimka started to build up as handicraft suburb of the town of Vinnytsia at the end of the 18th century and became famous for its distinctive architectural style, the so-called Jewish Baroque.

In 1942, a large part of the quarter was destroyed by German occupation troops. It was captured by the Red Army on 20 March 1944.

Today, some Jewish buildings are still in the quarter, particularly the synagogue, which was erected, as is written on its wall, in 1903.

Yerusalymka is now one of the central quarters of the town of Vinnytsia.
