= Chernobyl =

Partially abandoned city in Kyiv Oblast, Ukraine

Chernobyl Чорнобиль
- City
- Chornobyl
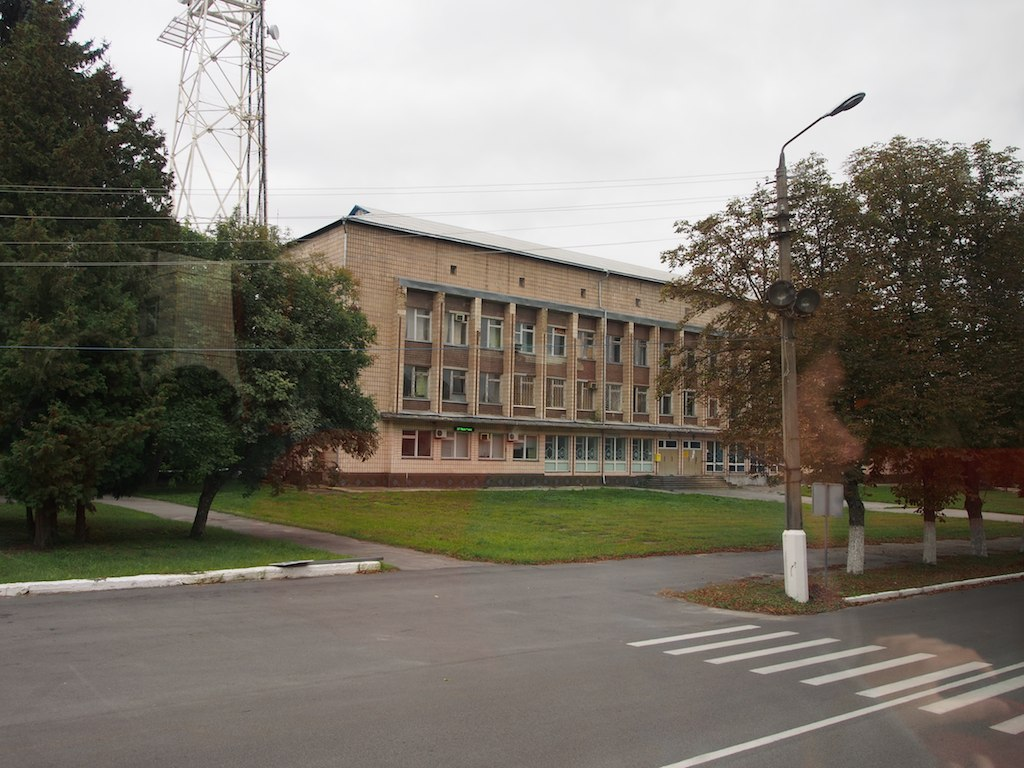
- Administrative Centre, Radiation Control (2013)
- Interactive map of Chernobyl
- Location within Ukraine's Kyiv Oblast Location within Ukraine Location within Europe
- Coordinates: 51°16′20″N 30°13′27″E
- Country: Ukraine
- Oblast: Kyiv Oblast
- Raion: Vyshhorod Raion
- First mentioned: 1193
- City status: 1941
- Abandoned: 1986
- Named for: Artemisia vulgaris

Government
  - Body: State Agency of Ukraine on the Exclusion Zone Management

Area
  - Total: 25 km^{2} (9.7 sq mi)

Population (2020)
  - Total: ~150 (est.)
- Time zone: UTC+2 (EET)
  - Summer (DST): UTC+3 (EEST)
- Postal code: 07270
- Area code: +380-4593
- ISO 3166 code: UA

Chernobyl, (Note: /tʃɜːrˈnoʊbəl/ chur-NOH-bəl, UK also /tʃɜːrˈnɒbəl/ chur-NOB-əl; Russian: Чернобыль, IPA: [tɕɪrˈnobɨlʲ]) also known as Chornobyl, (Note: Ukrainian: Чорнобиль, IPA: [tʃorˈnɔbɪlʲ]) is a partially abandoned city in Vyshhorod Raion, Kyiv Oblast, Ukraine. It is located within the Chernobyl Exclusion Zone, 90 kilometres (60 mi) to the north of Kyiv and 160 kilometres (100 mi) to the southwest of Gomel in neighbouring Belarus. Prior to being evacuated in the aftermath of the Chernobyl disaster in 1986, it was home to approximately 14,000 residents—considerably less than adjacent Pripyat, which was completely abandoned following the incident. Since then, although living anywhere within the Chernobyl Exclusion Zone is technically illegal, Ukrainian authorities have tolerated those who have taken up living in some of the city's less irradiated areas; Chernobyl's 2020 population estimate was 150 people.

First mentioned as a ducal hunting lodge in Kievan Rus' in 1193, the city has changed hands multiple times over the course of its history. In the 16th century, Jews began moving into Chernobyl, and at the end of the 18th century, it had become a major centre of Hasidic Judaism under the Twersky dynasty. During the early 20th century, pogroms and associated emigration caused the local Jewish community to dwindle significantly. By World War II, all remaining Jews in the city were murdered by Nazi Germany as part of the Holocaust.

In 1972, Chernobyl rose to prominence in the Soviet Union when it was selected as the site of the Chernobyl Nuclear Power Plant; Pripyat was constructed nearby to house the facility's workers. Located 15 kilometres (9 mi) to the north of Chernobyl proper, it opened in 1977. On 5 May 1986, nine days after Reactor No. 4 at the Chernobyl Nuclear Power Plant exploded, the Soviet government began evacuating the residents of both Chernobyl and Pripyat in preparation for the liquidators' management of the disaster. Following their subsequent settlement in the newly purpose-built city of Slavutych, most of the evacuees never returned. From 1923 onwards, Chernobyl had been the administrative centre of Chernobyl Raion, which was dissolved and merged with Ivankiv Raion in 1988, owing to widespread radioactive contamination in the region. Ivankiv Raion, in turn, was dissolved and merged with Vyshhorod Raion during Ukraine's 2020 administrative reform.

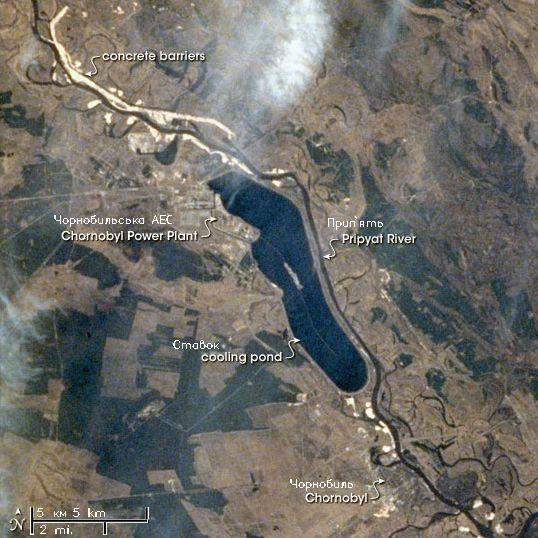
Photo of the town and Chernobyl Power plant from Mir station, 1997

Workers on watch and administrative personnel of the Chernobyl Exclusion Zone are stationed in the city, which has two general stores and a hotel. Though the city's atmosphere remained calm after the disaster was contained, the 2022 Russian invasion of Ukraine sparked international concern about the stability of Ukrainian nuclear facilities, especially pursuant to reports that Russia's occupation of the Chernobyl exclusion zone until April 2022 had caused a spike in radiation levels.

== Etymology ==
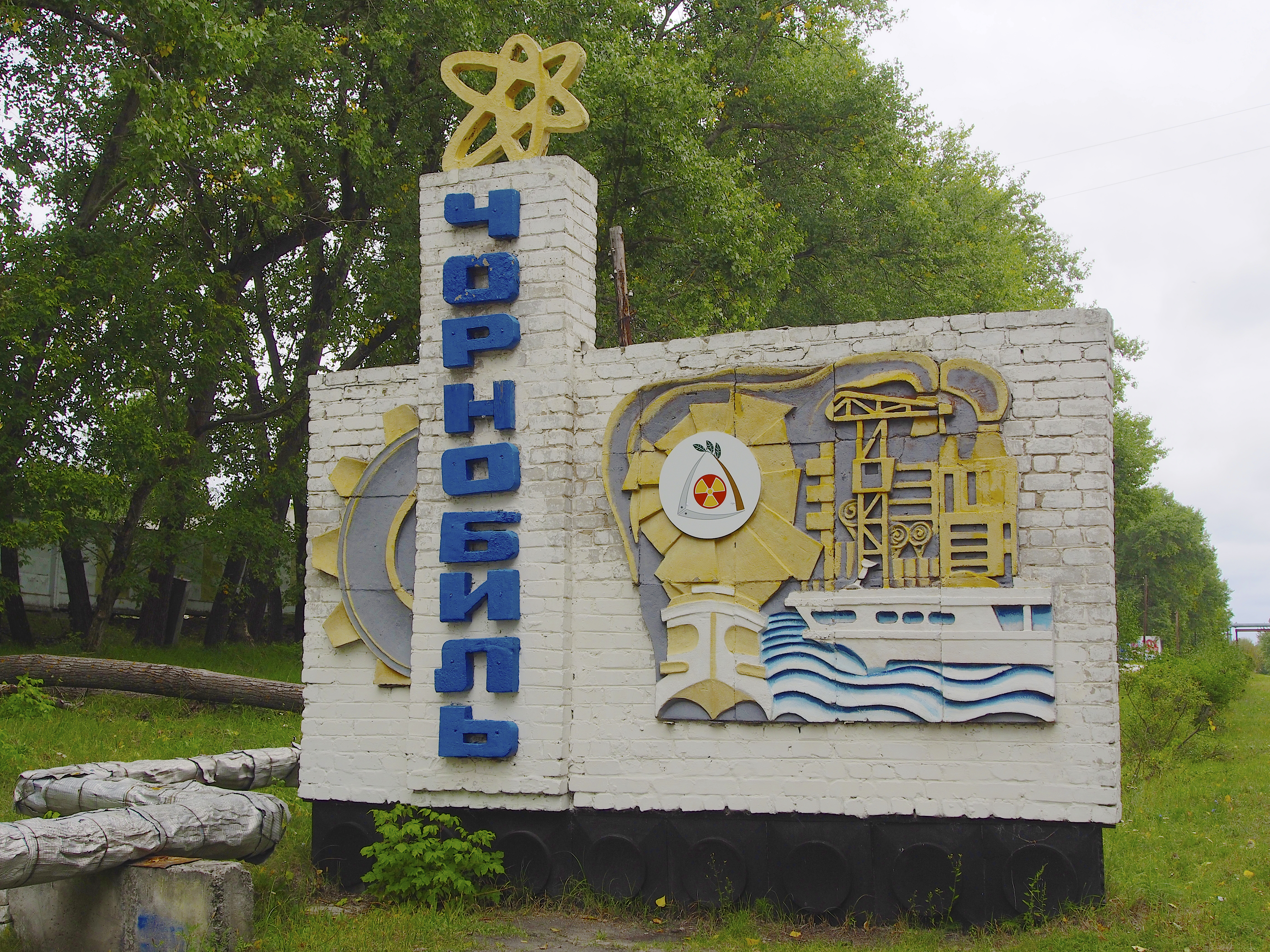
Chernobyl welcome sign

The names Chernobyl and Chornobyl are identical in form to the Russian and Ukrainian words for mugwort, which literally mean "black stem". It is likely, however, that the city's name in fact derives from the Old East Slavic personal name Чьрнобыль (Čǐrnobylǐ), combined with the possessive suffix -jь.

The name in languages used nearby is:

- Ukrainian: Чорнобиль, romanized: Chornobyl′, pronounced [tʃorˈnɔbɪlʲ]
- Belarusian: Чарнобыль, romanized: Čarnobyĺ, pronounced [t͡ʂarˈnɔbɨlʲ]
- Russian: Черно́быль, romanized: Chernobyl′, pronounced [tɕɪrˈnobɨlʲ].

The name in languages formerly used in the area is:

- Polish: Czarnobyl, pronounced [tʂarˈnɔbɨl]
- Yiddish: טשערנאָבל, romanized: Tshernobl, pronounced [tʃɛrˈnɔbl̩].

== History ==
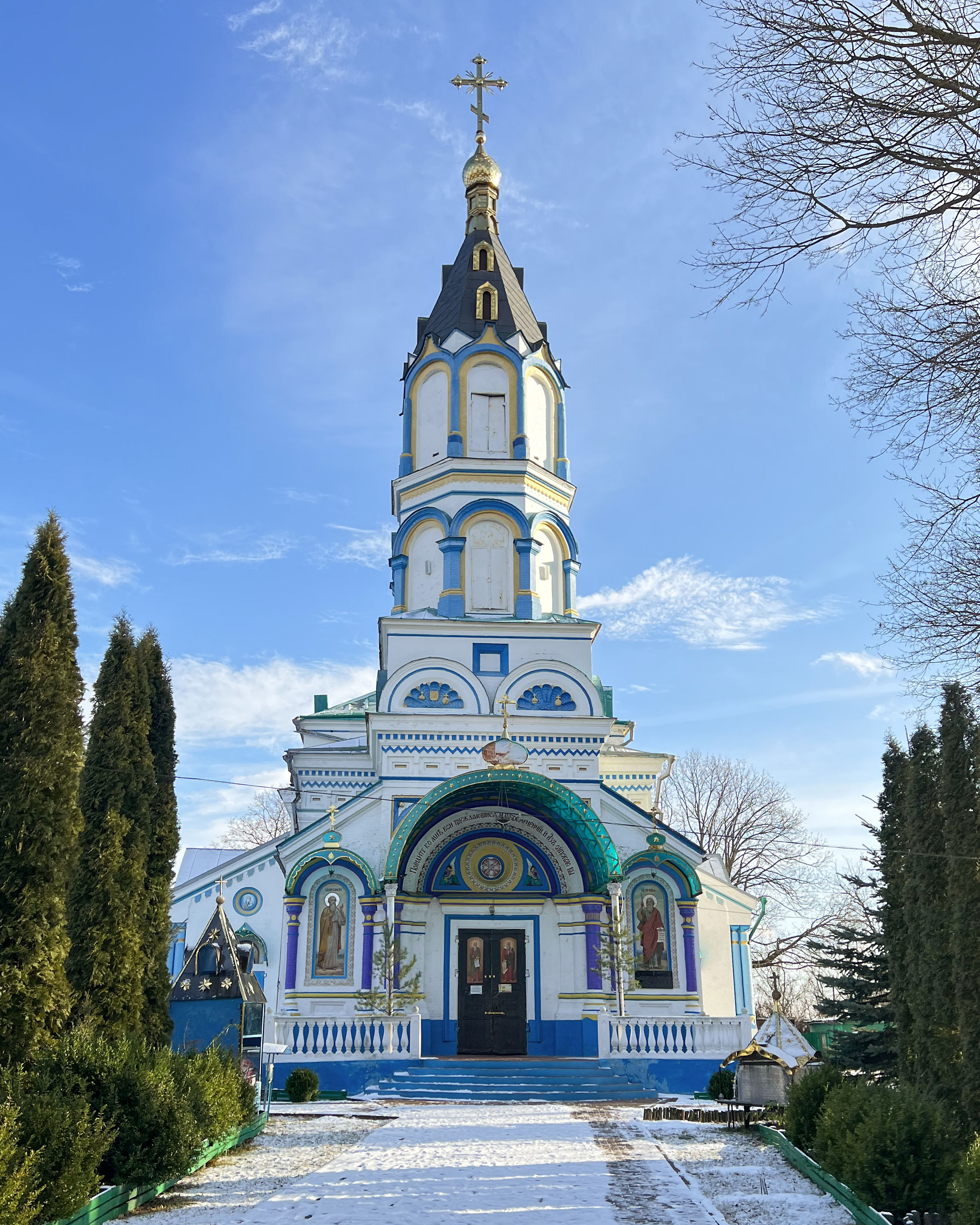
Orthodox Church of St. Elijah

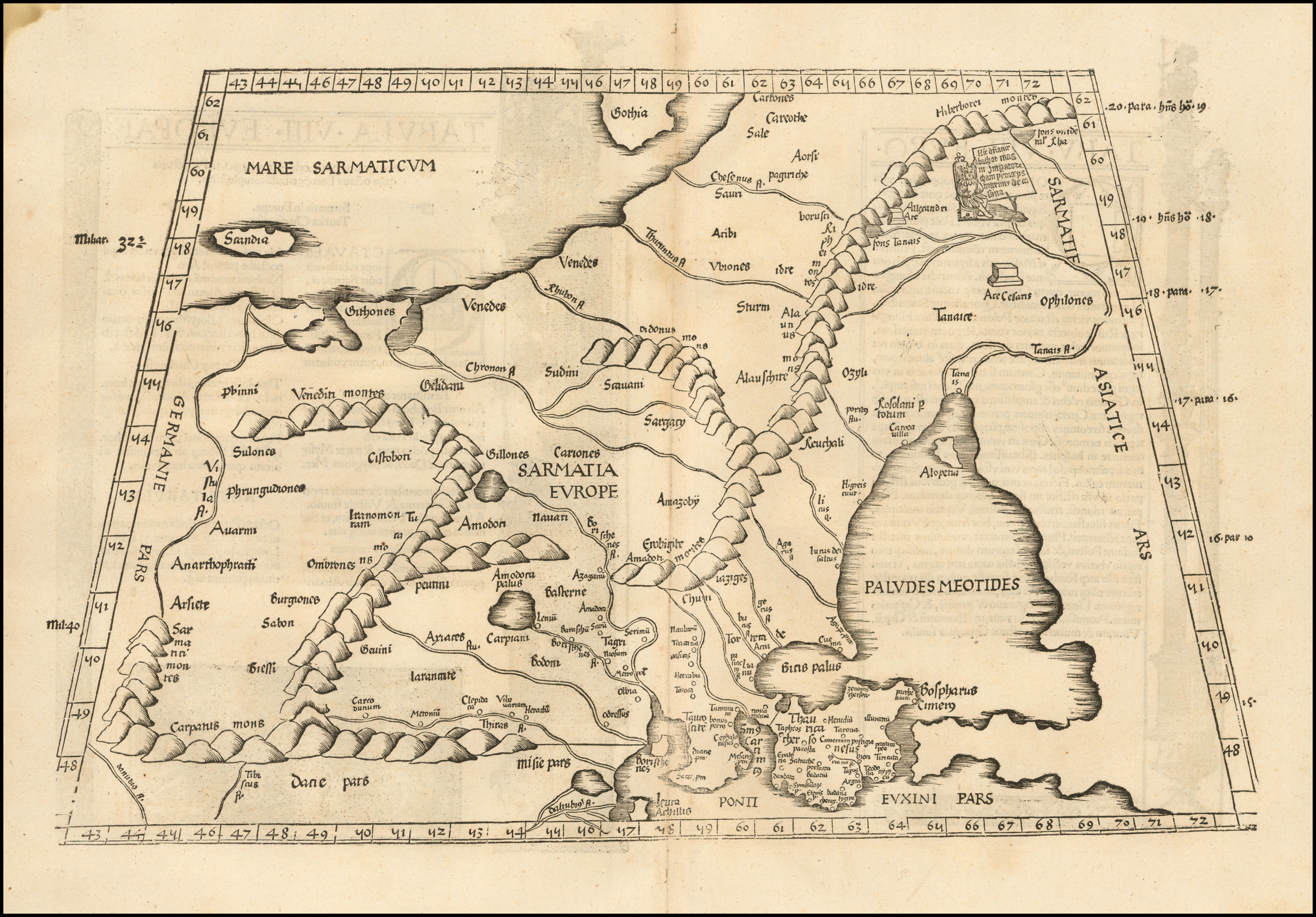
A 1525 European Sarmatia map after Ptolemy's Geography. Azagarium is marked on the west bank of the Boristhenes river (Dnieper), below the "Sarmatia Europe" inscription, east (right) of the lake captioned "Amodora palus". "Paludes Meotides" (Maeotian Swamp) is the Sea of Azov, "Ponti Euxini pars" marks the Black Sea, and the Carpathians are drawn in the bottom left (southwest) corner as "Carpatus mons".

The Polish Geographical Dictionary of the Kingdom of Poland of 1880–1902 states that the time the city was founded is not known.

=== Identity of Ptolemy's "Azagarium" ===
Some older geographical dictionaries and descriptions of modern Eastern Europe mention "Czernobol" (Chernobyl) with reference to Ptolemy's world map (2nd century AD). Czernobol is identified as Azagarium "oppidium Sarmatiae" (Lat., "a city in Sarmatia"), by the 1605 Lexicon geographicum of Filippo Ferrari and the 1677 Lexicon Universale of Johann Jakob Hofmann. According to the Dictionary of Ancient Geography of Alexander Macbean (London, 1773), Azagarium is "a town of Sarmatia Europaea, on the Borysthenes" (Dnieper), 36° East longitude and 50°40' latitude. The city is "now supposed to be Czernobol, a town of Poland, in Red Russia [Red Ruthenia], in the Palatinate of Kiow [Kiev Voivodeship], not far from the Borysthenes."

Whether Azagarium is indeed Czernobol is debatable. The question of Azagarium's correct location was raised in 1842 by Habsburg-Slovak historian, Pavel Jozef Šafárik, who published a book titled "Slavic Ancient History" ("Sławiańskie starożytności"), where he claimed Azagarium to be the hill of Zaguryna, which he found on an old Russian map "Bolzoj czertez" (Big drawing) near the city of Pereiaslav, now in central Ukraine.

In 2019, Ukrainian architect Boris Yerofalov-Pylypchak published a book, Roman Kyiv or Castrum Azagarium at Kyiv-Podil.

=== Kievan Rus' and post-medieval era (880–1793) ===
The archaeological excavations that were conducted in 2005–2008 found a cultural layer from the 10–12th centuries AD, which predates the first documentary mention of Chernobyl.

Around the 12th century Chernobyl was part of the land of Kievan Rus′. The first known mention of the settlement as Chernobyl is from an 1193 charter, which describes it as a hunting lodge of Knyaz Rurik Rostislavich. In 1362 it was a crown village of the Grand Duchy of Lithuania. Around that time the town had own castle which was ruined at least on two occasions in 1473 and 1482. The Chernobyl castle was rebuilt in the first quarter of the 16th century being located nearby the settlement in a hard to reach area. With revival of the castle, Chernobyl became a county seat. In 1552 it accounted for 196 buildings with 1,372 residents, out of which over 1,160 were considered city dwellers. In the city were developing various crafts professions such as blacksmith, cooper among others. Near Chernobyl has been excavated bog iron, out of which was produced iron. The village was granted to Filon Kmita, a captain of the royal cavalry, as a fiefdom in 1566. Following the Union of Lublin, the province where Chernobyl is located was transferred to the Crown of the Kingdom of Poland in 1569. Under the Polish Crown, Chernobyl became a seat of eldership (starostwo). During that period Chernobyl was inhabited by Ukrainian peasants, some Polish people and a relatively large number of Jews. Jews were brought to Chernobyl by Filon Kmita, during the Polish campaign of colonization. The first mentioning of Jewish community in Chernobyl is in the 17th century. In 1600 the first Roman Catholic church was built in the town. Local population was persecuted for holding Eastern Orthodox rite services. The traditionally Eastern Orthodox Ukrainian peasantry around the town were forcibly converted, by Poland, to the Ruthenian Uniate Church. In 1626, during the Counter-Reformation, a Dominican church and monastery were founded by Lukasz Sapieha. A group of Old Catholics opposed the decrees of the Council of Trent. The Chernobyl residents actively supported the Khmelnytsky Uprising (1648–1657).

With the signing of the Truce of Andrusovo in 1667, Chernobyl was secured after the Sapieha family. Sometime in the 18th century, the place was passed on to the Chodkiewicz family. In the mid-18th century the area around Chernobyl was engulfed in a number of peasant riots, which caused Prince Riepnin to write from Warsaw to Major General Krechetnikov, requesting hussars to be sent from Kharkiv to deal with the uprising near Chernobyl in 1768. The 8th Lithuanian Infantry Regiment was stationed in the town in 1791. By the end of the 18th century, the town accounted for 2,865 residents and had 642 buildings.

=== Imperial Russian era (1793–1917) ===
Following the Second Partition of Poland, in 1793 Chernobyl was annexed by the Russian Empire and became part of Radomyshl county (uezd) as a supernumerary town ("zashtatny gorod"). Many of the Uniate Church converts returned to Eastern Orthodoxy.

In 1832, following the failed Polish November Uprising, the Dominican monastery was sequestrated. The church of the Old Catholics was disbanded in 1852.

Until the end of the 19th century, Chernobyl was a privately owned city that belonged to the Chodkiewicz family. In 1896 they sold the city to the state, but until 1910 they owned a castle and a house in the city.

==== Hasidic Jewish dynasty of Chernobyl ====
In the second half of the 18th century, Chernobyl became a major centre of Hasidic Judaism. The Chernobyl Hasidic dynasty had been founded by Rabbi Menachem Nachum Twersky. The Jewish population suffered greatly from pogroms in October 1905 and in March–April 1919; many Jews were killed or robbed at the instigation of the Russian nationalist Black Hundreds. When the Twersky Dynasty left Chernobyl in 1920, it ceased to exist as a center of Hasidism.

Chernobyl had a population of 10,800 in 1898, including 7,200 Jews. In the beginning of March 1918 Chernobyl was occupied in World War I by German forces in accordance with the Treaty of Brest-Litovsk

=== Soviet era (1920–1991) ===
Ukrainians and Bolsheviks fought over the city in the ensuing Civil War. In the Polish–Soviet War of 1919–20, Chernobyl was taken first by the Polish Army and then by the cavalry of the Red Army. From 1921 onwards, it was officially incorporated into the Ukrainian SSR.

==== Holodomor ====
Between 1929 and 1933, Chernobyl suffered from killings during Stalin's collectivization campaign. It was also affected by the famine that resulted from Stalin's policies. The Polish and German community of Chernobyl was deported to Kazakhstan in 1936, during the Frontier Clearances.

==== World War II and the Holocaust ====
During World War II, Chernobyl was occupied by the German Army from 25 August 1941 to 17 November 1943. When the Germans arrived, only 400 Jews remained in Chernobyl; they were murdered during the Holocaust.

==== Chernobyl Nuclear Power Plant ====
In 1972, the Duga-1 radio receiver, part of the larger Duga over-the-horizon radar array, began construction 11 km (6.8 mi) west-northwest of Chernobyl. It was the origin of the Russian Woodpecker and was designed as part of an anti-ballistic missile early-warning radar network.

On 15 August 1972, the Chernobyl Nuclear Power Plant (officially the Vladimir Ilyich Lenin Nuclear Power Plant) began construction about 15 km (9.3 mi) northwest of Chernobyl. The plant was built alongside Pripyat, an "atomograd" city founded on 4 February 1970 that was intended to serve the nuclear power plant. The decision to build the power plant was adopted by the Central Committee of the Communist Party of the Soviet Union and the Council of Ministers of the Soviet Union on recommendations of the State Planning Committee that the Ukrainian SSR be its location. It was the first nuclear power plant to be built in Ukraine.

==== 26 April 1986: Chernobyl disaster ====
After the nuclear disaster at the Chernobyl Nuclear Power Plant; the worst nuclear disaster in history, the city of Chernobyl was evacuated on 5 May 1986. Along with the residents of the nearby city of Pripyat, built as a home for the plant's workers, the population was relocated to the newly built city of Slavutych. While Pripyat remains completely abandoned with no remaining inhabitants, Chernobyl has since hosted a small population.

=== Independent Ukrainian era (1991–present) ===
With the dissolution of the Soviet Union in 1991, Chernobyl remained part of Ukraine within the Chernobyl Exclusion Zone which Ukraine inherited from the Soviet Union.

==== 2022 Russian occupation of Chernobyl ====
On 24 February 2022, shortly after the 2022 Russian invasion of Ukraine, Russian forces captured the city. Following the capture of Chernobyl, the Russian army used the city as a staging point for attacks on Kyiv. Ukrainian officials reported that the radiation levels in the city had started to rise due to recent military activity causing radioactive dust to ascend into the air. Hundreds of Russian soldiers were suffering from radiation poisoning after digging trenches in a contaminated area, and one died. On 31 March it was reported that Russian forces had left the exclusion zone. Ukrainian authorities reasserted control over the area on 2 April.

== Geography ==
Chernobyl is located about 90 kilometres (60 mi) north of Kyiv, and 160 kilometres (100 mi) southwest of the Belarusian city of Gomel.

=== Climate ===
Chernobyl has a humid continental climate (Dfb) with very warm, wet summers with cool nights and long, cold, and snowy winters.

Climate data for Chernobyl, 127 m asl (1981–2010 normals, extremes 1955–present)
Month	Jan	Feb	Mar	Apr	May	Jun	Jul	Aug	Sep	Oct	Nov	Dec	Year
Record high °C (°F)	11.5 (52.7)	17.0 (62.6)	22.6 (72.7)	26.6 (79.9)	32.9 (91.2)	34.0 (93.2)	35.2 (95.4)	36.3 (97.3)	35.9 (96.6)	26.3 (79.3)	19.6 (67.3)	11.3 (52.3)	36.3 (97.3)
Mean daily maximum °C (°F)	−0.8 (30.6)	0.1 (32.2)	6.0 (42.8)	14.5 (58.1)	21.0 (69.8)	23.7 (74.7)	25.7 (78.3)	25.0 (77.0)	18.9 (66.0)	12.4 (54.3)	4.2 (39.6)	−0.3 (31.5)	12.5 (54.5)
Daily mean °C (°F)	−3.5 (25.7)	−3.4 (25.9)	1.5 (34.7)	8.9 (48.0)	14.9 (58.8)	17.9 (64.2)	19.9 (67.8)	18.8 (65.8)	13.4 (56.1)	7.7 (45.9)	1.4 (34.5)	−2.8 (27.0)	7.9 (46.2)
Mean daily minimum °C (°F)	−6.1 (21.0)	−6.7 (19.9)	−2.3 (27.9)	3.9 (39.0)	9.1 (48.4)	12.3 (54.1)	14.5 (58.1)	13.3 (55.9)	8.7 (47.7)	3.8 (38.8)	−1.1 (30.0)	−5.2 (22.6)	3.7 (38.7)
Record low °C (°F)	−29.7 (−21.5)	−32.8 (−27.0)	−20.0 (−4.0)	−9.0 (15.8)	−6.0 (21.2)	2.2 (36.0)	6.2 (43.2)	0.0 (32.0)	−1.6 (29.1)	−10.5 (13.1)	−20.0 (−4.0)	−30.8 (−23.4)	−32.8 (−27.0)
Average precipitation mm (inches)	34.0 (1.34)	36.8 (1.45)	35.6 (1.40)	40.0 (1.57)	60.8 (2.39)	73.2 (2.88)	79.5 (3.13)	55.3 (2.18)	56.3 (2.22)	42.2 (1.66)	47.7 (1.88)	42.6 (1.68)	604.0 (23.78)
Average precipitation days (≥ 1.0 mm)	8.1	8.9	8.1	7.5	8.7	10.2	9.2	7.1	8.7	7.4	8.7	9.1	101.7
Average relative humidity (%)	83.5	79.8	74.7	66.7	66.0	70.4	72.8	72.3	77.8	80.8	85.3	85.9	76.3
Source 1: NOAA
Source 2: Météo Climat (extremes)

== Aftermath of the Chernobyl disaster and evacuation ==
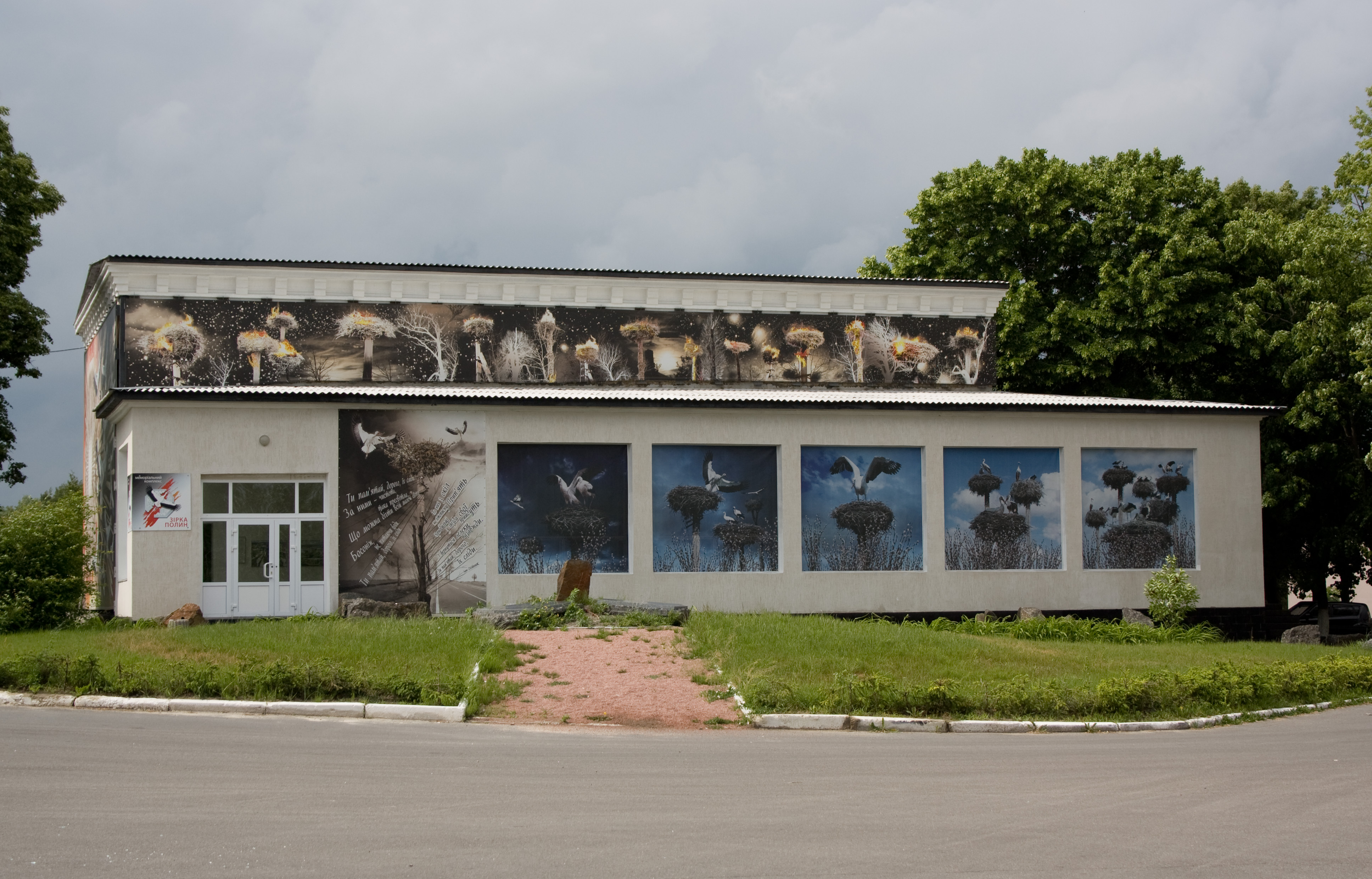
Wormwood Star Memorial Complex

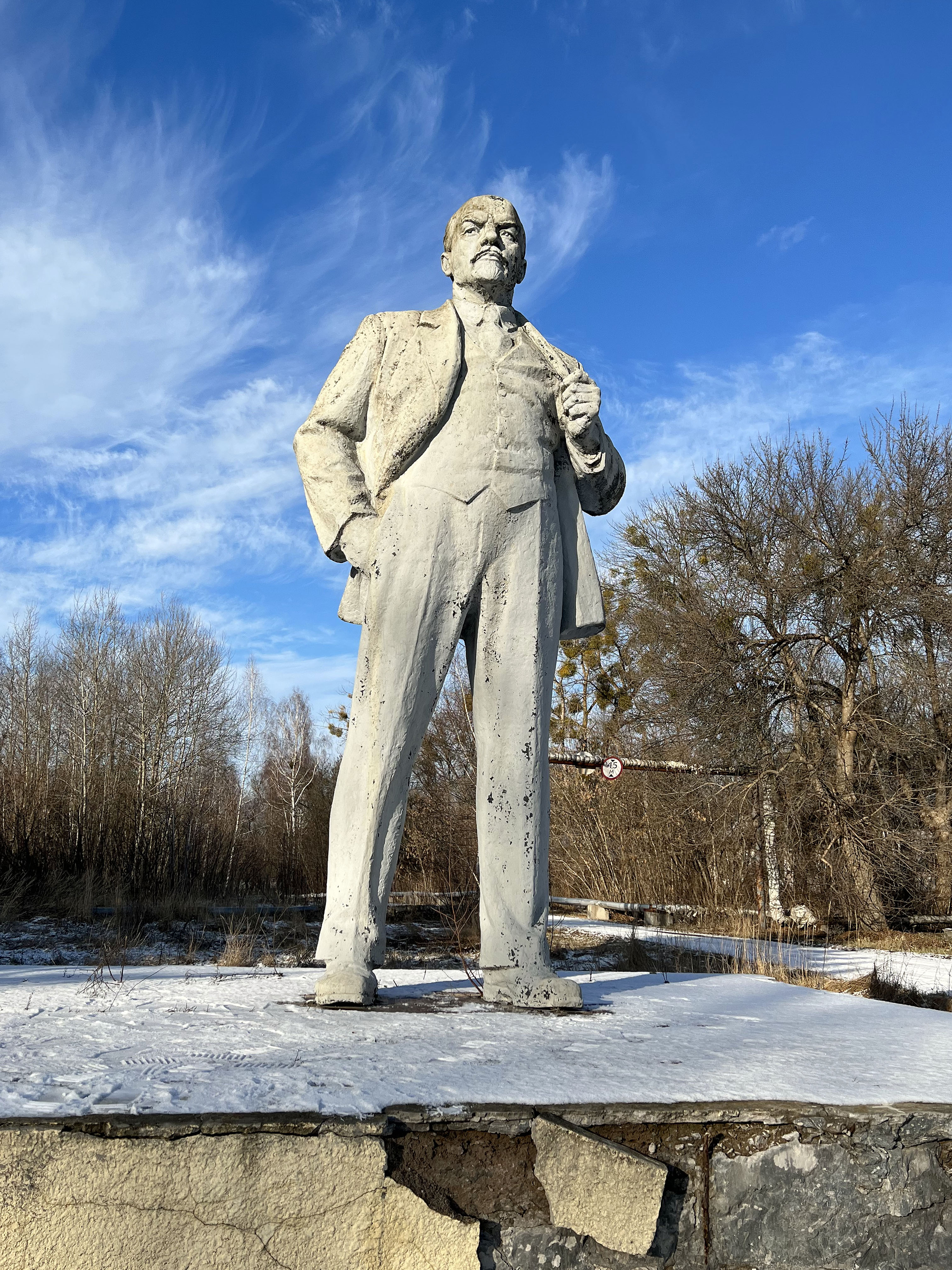
Statue of Vladimir Lenin, removed in November 2022

On 26 April 1986, one of the reactors at the Chernobyl Nuclear Power Plant exploded after a scheduled test on the reactor was carried out improperly by plant operators. The resulting loss of control was due to design flaws of the RBMK reactor, which made it unstable when operated at low power, and prone to thermal runaway where increases in temperature increase reactor power output.

Chernobyl city was evacuated nine days after the disaster. The level of contamination with caesium-137 was around 555 kBq/m^{2} (surface ground deposition in 1986).

Later analyses concluded that, even with very conservative estimates, relocation of the city (or of any area below 1500 kBq/m^{2}) could not be justified on the grounds of radiological health. This however does not account for the uncertainty in the first few days of the accident about further depositions and weather patterns. Moreover, an earlier short-term evacuation could have averted more significant doses from short-lived isotope radiation (specifically iodine-131, which has a half-life of eight days). The long-term health effects of the Chernobyl disaster are a subject of some controversy.

In 1998, average caesium-137 doses from the accident (estimated at 1–2 mSv per year) did not exceed those from other sources of exposure. Current effective caesium-137 dose rates as of 2019 are 200–250 nSv/h, or roughly 1.7–2.2 mSv per year, which is comparable to the worldwide average background radiation from natural sources.

The base of operations for the administration and monitoring of the Chernobyl Exclusion Zone was moved from Pripyat to Chernobyl. Chernobyl currently contains offices for the State Agency of Ukraine on the Exclusion Zone Management and accommodations for visitors. Apartment blocks have been repurposed as accommodations for employees of the State Agency. The length of time that workers may spend within the Chernobyl Exclusion Zone is restricted by regulations that have been implemented to limit radiation exposure. Today, visits are allowed to Chernobyl but limited by strict rules.

In 2003, the United Nations Development Programme launched a project, called the Chernobyl Recovery and Development Programme (CRDP), for the recovery of the affected areas. The main goal of the CRDP's activities is supporting the efforts of the Government of Ukraine to mitigate the long-term social, economic, and ecological consequences of the Chernobyl disaster.

The city has become overgrown and many types of animals live there. According to census information collected over an extended period of time, it is estimated that more mammals live there now than before the disaster.

Notably, Mikhail Gorbachev, the final leader of the Soviet Union, stated in respect to the Chernobyl disaster that, "More than anything else, (Chernobyl) opened the possibility of much greater freedom of expression, to the point that the (Soviet) system as we knew it could no longer continue."

== Notable people ==
- Aaron Twersky of Chernobyl (1784–1871), rabbi
- Aleksander Franciszek Chodkiewicz (1776–1838), Polish politician and lithographer
- Alexander Krasnoshchyokov (1880–1937), politician
- Andriy Smalko (1981–), football player
- Arnold Lakhovsky (1880–1937), artist
- Jan Mikołaj Chodkiewicz (1738–1781), Polish nobleman, father of Rozalia Lubomirska
- Ekaterina Scherbachenko (1977–), opera singer
- Grigory Irmovich Novak (1919–1980), Jewish Soviet weightlifter
- Joshua ben Aaron Zeitlin (1823–1888), scholar and philanthropist
- Markiyan Kamysh (1988–), novelist and son of a liquidator
- Rozalia Lubomirska (1768–1794), Polish noblewoman guillotined during the French Revolution
- Volodymyr Pravyk (1962–1986), firefighter and liquidator

== See also ==
- List of Chernobyl-related articles
