= Antisemitism in the Russian Empire =

Antisemitism in the Russian Empire included numerous pogroms and the designation of the Pale of Settlement from which Jews were forbidden to migrate into the interior of Russia, unless they converted to the Russian Orthodox state religion.

Russia remained unaffected by the liberalising tendencies of this era with respect to the status of Jews. Before the 18th century, Russia maintained an exclusionary policy towards Jews, in accordance with the anti-Jewish precepts of the Russian Orthodox Church. When asked about admitting Jews into the Empire, Peter the Great stated "I prefer to see in our midst nations professing Mohammedanism and paganism rather than Jews. They are rogues and cheats. It is my endeavor to eradicate evil, not to multiply it."

== Pale of Settlement ==
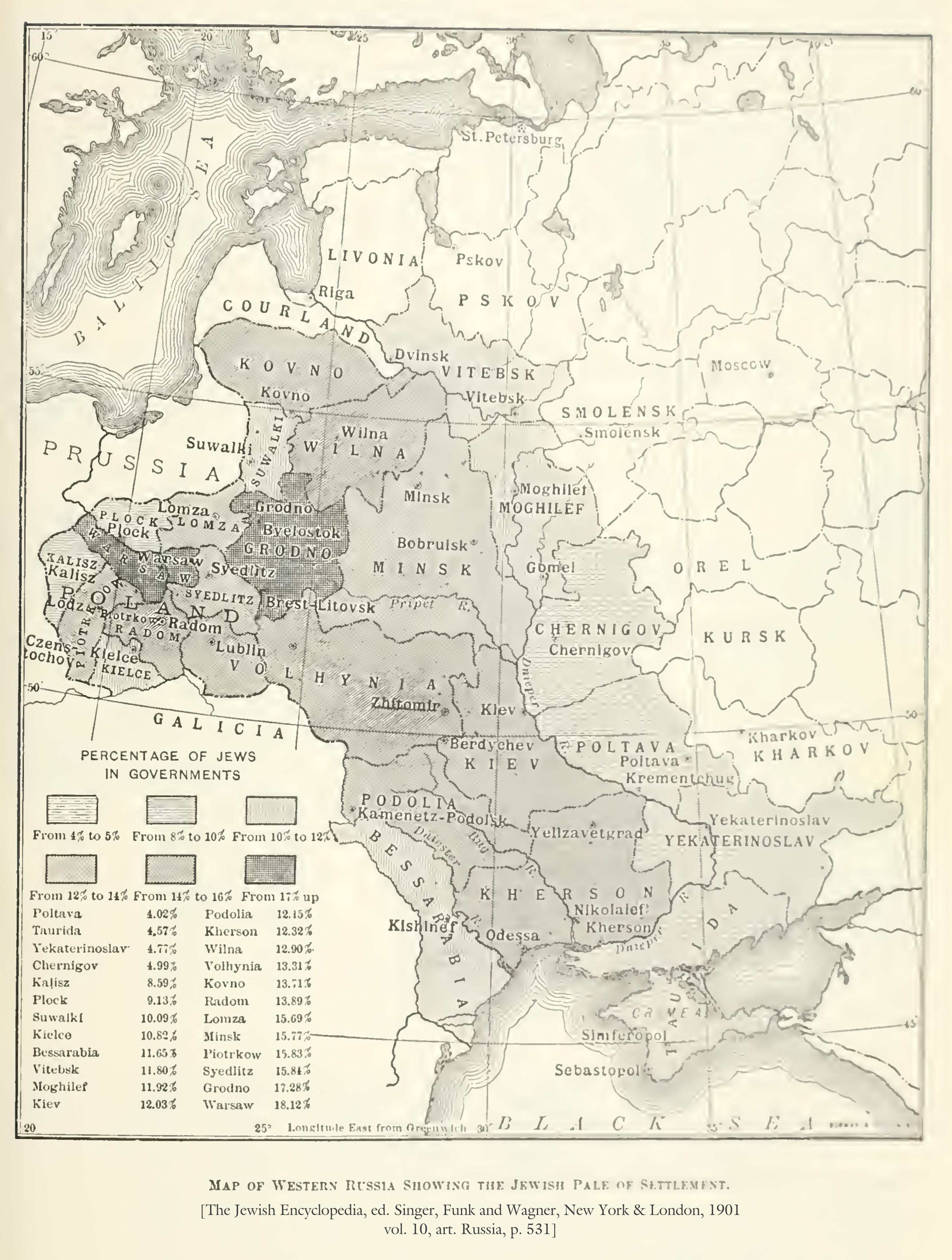
Map of Pale of Settlement, showing Jewish population densities

More active discriminatory policies began with the partition of Poland in the 18th century by Austria, Prussia (Germany) and Russia, which resulted, for the first time in Russian history, in the possession of land with a large population of Jews in the Russian Partition. This land was designated as the Pale of Settlement from which Jews were forbidden to migrate into the interior of Russia. In 1772, Catherine II forced the Jews of the Pale of Settlement to stay in their shtetls and forbade them from returning to the towns that they occupied before the partition of Poland. The Pale of Settlement was officialized in 1791 with the purpose of ridding Moscow of Jews. Its borders were finalized in 1812 with the annexation of Bessarabia.

== Forced conscription ==
Tsar Nicholas I aimed to destroy Jewish life, and his reign is remembered as one of the most painful episodes for European Jewry. In 1827, Tsar Nicholas ordered the conscription of all Jewish males into the Imperial Russian Army beginning at age 12. In Jewish diasporal communities hailing from the Russian Empire, the 19th century is often recalled as a time when Jews were forced to the front lines of the army and used as "cannon fodder". Jews were forbidden from becoming officers. Many of the boys forced into the military were captured by "snatchers" (khapers). Jewish agricultural communities in more Southern areas were often exempt as the Russian government liked to encourage agriculturalism among Jews, while other communities that were exempted were often expelled from their towns and villages.

The Crimean War led to an increased kidnapping of Jewish male children and young men to fight on the front.

In 1912, a law was passed forbidding even those who were the grandchildren of Jews from being officers, despite the large numbers of Jews and those of Jewish descent in the military.

== Assimilation attempts ==
In the 1840s, the Russian imperial government imposed a special tax on the Jews, and used the money to build a network of "Jewish schools", with the goal of assimilating them into Russian culture. It was decreed that teachers in these schools had to be Christian, and that "the purpose of the education of the Jews is to bring them nearer to the Christians and to uproot their harmful beliefs which are influenced by the Talmud."

In 1844, Polish-style communities were forcibly disbanded, and replaced with new settlement structures. Growing payot was officially forbidden, and Tsar Nicholas officially classified all Jews into two categories, "useful" and "non-useful", with merchants being considered "useful" and others being considered "non-useful".

The reign of Tsar Alexander II saw the removal of some antisemitic legal persecution, but the intensification of measures aimed to dissolve Jewish culture into the national Russian culture. Under Alexander's rule Jews who graduated from secondary school were permitted to live outside the Pale of Settlement. As a result of these measures, many Jews achieved commercial success; however, the increased presence of Jews was opposed by various sectors of Russian society.

== Pogroms ==
A series of genocidal persecutions, or pogroms, against Jews took place in Russia. These arose from a variety of motivations, not all of them related to Christian antisemitism, which derived from the notion that Jews were responsible for the crucifixion of Jesus. The primary pretext for the pogroms, however, was the assassination of Tsar Alexander II.

The first pogrom is often considered to be the 1821 anti-Jewish riots in Odesa (modern Ukraine) after the death of the Greek Orthodox Patriarch Gregory V of Constantinople, in which 14 Jews were killed. The virtual Jewish encyclopedia claims that initiators of 1821 pogroms were the local Greeks that used to have a substantial diaspora in the port cities of what was known as Novorossiya.

=== Tsar Alexander III (1881–1894) ===
Long-standing repressive policies and attitudes towards the Jews were intensified after the assassination of Tsar Alexander II on 13 March 1881. This event was blamed on the Jews and sparked widespread anti-Jewish pogroms, which lasted for three years, from 27 April 1881 to 1884.

The Warsaw pogrom of 1881, which worsened Polish-Jewish relations, was criticized by some members of the Polish elite. Historian Michael Ochs notes that the period from 1863 to 1881 saw an increase in antisemitism in the Russian-ruled Poland.

Tsar Alexander III (1881–1894) was hostile to Jews; his reign brought a sharp deterioration in the Jews' economic, social, and political condition. His policy was eagerly implemented by tsarist officials in the "May Laws" of 1882. They officially blamed Jews for the Tsar's death. They banned Jews from inhabiting rural areas and shtetls (even within the Pale of Settlement) and restricted the occupations in which they could engage. The Russian imperial police strictly applied the antisemitic laws, while the Russian media engaged in antisemitic propaganda. In 1891, all Jews were systematically expelled from Moscow. These repressions convinced many Jews that Russia could no longer be their home. The Tsar's minister Konstantin Pobedonostsev stated the aim of the government with regard to the Jews was that "One third will die out, one third will leave the country and one third will be completely dissolved in the surrounding population". The pogroms and the repressive legislation resulted in the mass emigration of Jews to western Europe and the Americas. Between 1881 and the outbreak of the First World War, an estimated 2.5 million Jews left Russia—one of the largest group migrations in recorded history.

After the Pesach pogrom of 1903, pogroms became the official policy of the Russian Empire, and the antisemitic terror reached its peak in October 1905.

== Jan Gotlib Bloch confronts antisemitism ==
Jan Gotlib Bloch (1836–1901) a wealthy railroad magnate and researcher on warfare and society converted to Calvinism, the religion of a small minority in the Russian Empire. In this way he was able to avoid the legal disabilities imposed on Jews under Tsarist rule, especially the geographical limitation to the Pale of Settlement, banning Jews from living in the Empire's main cities—without needing to regularly attend a church and be visibly practising Christianity. As became evident especially in the later part of his life, he retained a strong concern for the situation of the Jews, even if formally no longer one of them. Following the wave of pogroms of the 1880s and the early 1890s, a commission headed by the vociferously antisemitic Interior Minister Vyacheslav von Plehve recommended a further worsening of the Jews' legal position. In response, Bloch sent to the government a series of well-reasoned memoranda calling for an end to the discrimination of the Jews. Bloch embarked upon an extensive research on the social and economic conditions of the Russian Empire's Jewish subjects. For that purpose, he established a team of scientific researchers headed by the Russian economist A. P. Subbotin, on whose work he spent hundreds of thousands of rubles. The result, completed only in 1901—one year before Bloch's death—was a five-volume work entitled "Comparison of the material and moral levels in the Western Great-Russian and Polish Regions". On the basis of extensive statistical data, compiled mainly in the Pale of Settlement, he gave a comprehensive account of the Jewish role in the Empire's economic life, in crafts, trade and industry. The study showed that the Jews were a boon to the Russian economy—rather than damaging and threatening it, as was at the time regularly claimed by antisemites. Bloch's great effort was, however, in vain. The Russian Council of Ministers banned the work, and nearly all copies were confiscated and burned. Only a few surviving copies remained in circulation, as great rarities. Subotin was, however, later able to publish a summary entitled "The Jewish Question in the Right Light".

== The Protocols of the Elders of Zion ==
The Protocols of the Elders of Zion, published in Russia in 1903, was an antisemitic forgery. Widely circulated and translated, it became a powerful propaganda weapon for antisemitic elements worldwide. Henry Ford sponsored its circulation in the United States. It claimed a secret Jewish cabal was taking over the world.

== Jewish response ==
In the second half of the 19th century, in response to the widespread and systematic persecution of Jews, many Jews fled the Russian Empire, but with the spread of literacy, many of those who stayed were drawn into radical and reformist ideologies, attracted by the prospect of liberation of Jewish communities from the conditions imposed on them, as well as disgust at the political system of the Russian Empire. The Russian Social Democratic Labour Party included many Jews such as Julius Martov and Leon Trotsky in its leadership, as did the Social Revolutionary Party of Russia. The same period saw the Bundist and Zionist movements emerge and rapidly grow, with their promises to end the persecution of Jews, but their growth led to a polarization of Jewish communities due to their diverging political goals. While the Bundists proclaimed the superiority of the Yiddish language, the Zionists promoted Hebrew as a lingua franca for Jews of varying geographic origins. The Zionist movement in Russia was officially started with the Hibbat Zion movement in 1881–1883, in response to the growing pogroms against Jews. While the Bundists saw the home for Russian Jewry in Russia, the Zionists aimed to establish a Jewish state free of rule by foreigners. Although the Zionist movement was first organized in Western Europe, the majority of its adherents came from Eastern Europe, the Russian Empire in particular. Russian Jews were the founders of Labor Zionism. Despite, or perhaps because of, its popularity, all Zionist organizations were outlawed in Russia. The Bundists, on the other hand, proclaimed Yiddish as a national language for Jews and argued for a separate set of Jewish-run schools.

Zionism stressed self-respect and self-defense for Jewish communities, and by the 1900s, despite ideological differences, Bundists, Labor Zionists and other Zionists banded together to form self-defense organizations against Russian pogroms.

=== Response of the United States ===
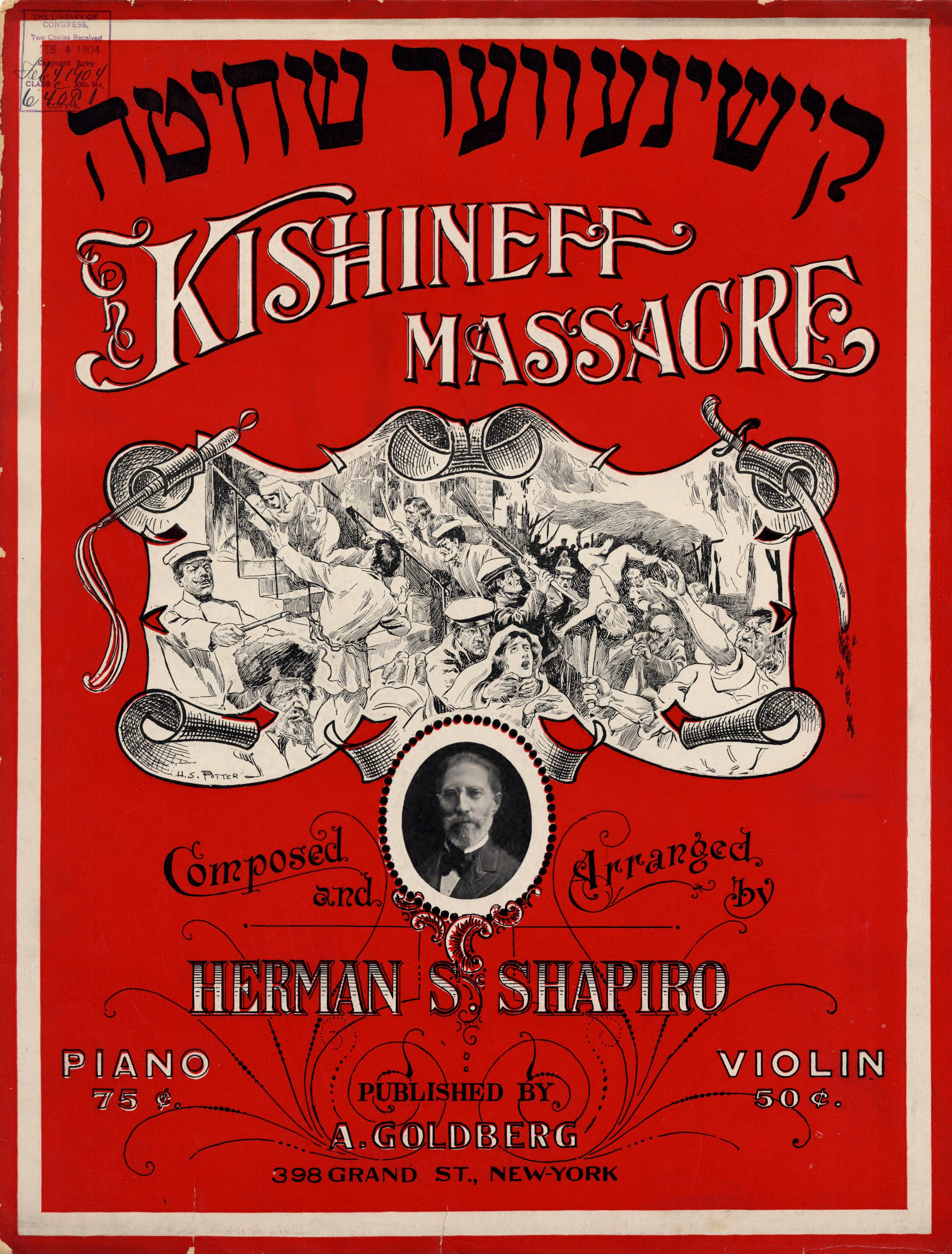
Herman S. Shapiro. "Kishinever shekhita, elegie" (Kishinev Massacre Elegy). Musical composition in New York attacking the Kishinev pogrom, 1904.

Repeated large-scale murderous pogroms in the late 19th and early 20th century increasingly angered American opinion. The well-established German Jews in the United States, although they were not directly affected by the Russian pogroms, were well organized and convinced Washington to support the cause of Jews in Russia. Led by Oscar Straus, Jacob Schiff, Mayer Sulzberger, and Rabbi Stephen Samuel Wise, they organized protest meetings, issued publicity, and met with President Theodore Roosevelt and Secretary of State John Hay. Stuart E. Knee reports that in April, 1903, Roosevelt received 363 addresses, 107 letters and 24 petitions signed by thousands of Christians leading public and church leaders—they all called on the Tsar to stop the persecution of Jews. Public rallies were held in scores of cities, topped off at Carnegie Hall in New York City in May. The Tsar retreated a bit and fired one local official after the Kishinev pogrom, which Roosevelt explicitly denounced. But Roosevelt was mediating the Russo-Japanese War and could not publicly take sides. Therefore Secretary Hay took the initiative in Washington. Finally Roosevelt forwarded a petition to the Tsar, who rejected it claiming the Jews were at fault. Roosevelt won American Jewish support in his 1904 landslide reelection. The pogroms continued, as hundreds of thousands of Jews fled Russia, most heading for London or New York. With American public opinion turning against Russia, the United States Congress officially denounced its policies in 1906. Roosevelt kept a low profile as did his new Secretary of State Elihu Root. However in late 1906 Roosevelt did appoint the first Jew to the U.S. Cabinet, Oscar Straus becoming Secretary of Commerce and Labor.

== Beilis trial ==
Menahem Mendel Beilis was a Russian Jew accused of ritual murder in Kiev in the Russian Empire in a notorious 1913 trial, known as the "Beilis trial" or "Beilis affair". The process sparked international criticism of the antisemitic policies of the Russian Empire. The Beilis trial took place in Kiev from September 25 through October 28, 1913. The Beilis case was compared with the Leo Frank case in which an American Jew was convicted of killing a 13-year-old girl in Atlanta. After his acquittal, Beilis became an enormous hero and celebrity.

== World War I ==
In World War I, many Jews felt they could improve their position in society if they contributed to defending Russia. Over 400,000 were mobilized and 80,000 served on the front lines. Despite this, when the Imperial Russian Army faced defeat, antisemitic commanders blamed Jewish populations. Although pillaging by Russian soldiers became an issue in general during the Great Retreat, Jews were frequently targeted. Jews were accused of treason and spying for the Germans, with some Jews being kidnapped and tried for espionage. After their trials, mass expulsions of Jews living near the front lines were organized, with Jews being expelled from Courland and northern Lithuania in 1915. One month later, the printing of Hebrew characters was forbidden.

== February Revolution ==
When the Russian Provisional Government was put into place on 16 March 1917, all antisemitic measures were abolished, and Jews served in important government positions. As a result, the February Revolution saw enthusiastic support from Jews, and Jews served important roles for various political parties. Zionist youth groups were formed across the country, Zionists held celebratory rallies in response to the Balfour Declaration, and Zionists formed Jewish self-defense battalions. However, only a few months after its foundation, the provisional government was overthrown by the Bolsheviks in the October Revolution, and in the ensuing anarchy, violent antisemitism returned to Russia, with sporadic pogroms. Anton Denikin's White Army was a bastion of antisemitism, using "Strike at the Jews and save Russia!" as its motto. The Bolshevik Red Army, although committing antisemitic abuses, had a policy of opposing antisemitism, and as a result, it won more support of much of the Jewish population, although Soviet policies of anti-religious propaganda and nationalization of private property proved unpopular and foreshadowed future antisemitism in the Soviet Union.

== Involvement of the Russian Orthodox Church ==
The anti-Jewish policies by the Russian state were supported by the Ecclesiastical Collegium under Peter the Great and, later by the Holy Synod. These institutions of the Church served essentially as government departments. Russian Orthodox population generally "maintained a more or less neutral attitude" towards Jews during periods of calm, with a "mixture of fear and hatred of Jews characteristic of medieval Christian consciousness" smouldering below the surface. However, social, economic, religious or political changes occasionally brought this undercurrent of antisemitism to the surface, changing the Christian populace into "a fanatical crowd capable of murder and pillage." All "anti-Jewish decisions were conducted by state administrative organs, acting on the authority of emperors, state committees and ministries.", but "unlike the Western church, the Russian Orthodox Church took no steps to protect the Jews." Moreover, despite the lack of an official church position on the Jewish question, priests and even bishops of the Russian Orthodox Church were vulnerable to believing the antisemitic propaganda spread by the Tsarist civil service and by extreme nationalist paramilitary organizations like the Black Hundreds and the Union of the Russian People. For this reason, the rioters in the first Kishinev pogrom of 1903 were led by Eastern Orthodox priests.

== See also ==
- Antisemitism in Russia
- Antisemitism in Ukraine
- Antisemitism in the Soviet Union
- History of the Jews in Russia
- History of the Jews in Poland
- History of the Jews in 19th-century Poland
- History of the Jews in the Soviet Union
- History of the Jews in Ukraine
- Racism in Poland
- Racism in Russia
- Racism in the Soviet Union
- Racism in Ukraine
- Relations between Eastern Orthodoxy and Judaism
