= Joshua ben Aaron Zeitlin =

Joshua ben Aaron Zeitlin (October 10, 1823, in Kiev – January 11, 1888, in Dresden), was a Jewish Russian scholar and philanthropist.

While he was still young his parents removed to Chernobyl, where he associated with the Chasidim, later devoting himself to the study of secular sciences as well as the Hebrew language and literature. He was married at Slutsk, where he studied for some time with Samuel Simchowitz, with whom he later engaged in business. Leaving Slutsk, Zeitlin resided for several years in St. Petersburg, and afterward settled in Moscow, where he became prominent as a benefactor of Talmudic students and Maskilim. During the Russo-Turkish war he was a contractor for the Russian army, and on August 1, 1879, Czar Alexander II awarded him a medal in recognition of his services.

In 1883 Zeitlin left Russia and settled in Dresden, where he collected a large library, which he placed at the disposal of Talmudic students.

In the beginning of 1887 he undertook a journey to the Holy Land, where he celebrated the Passover. He visited Jerusalem and Hebron, and took great interest in the Jewish antiquities, as well as in the agricultural colonies of Palestine, to which he bequeathed 50,000 francs, in addition to many bequests to educational institutions.
