= Oleksandr Rozenfeld =

Soviet-Ukrainian scientist (born 1949)

- Олександр Ілліч Розенфельд
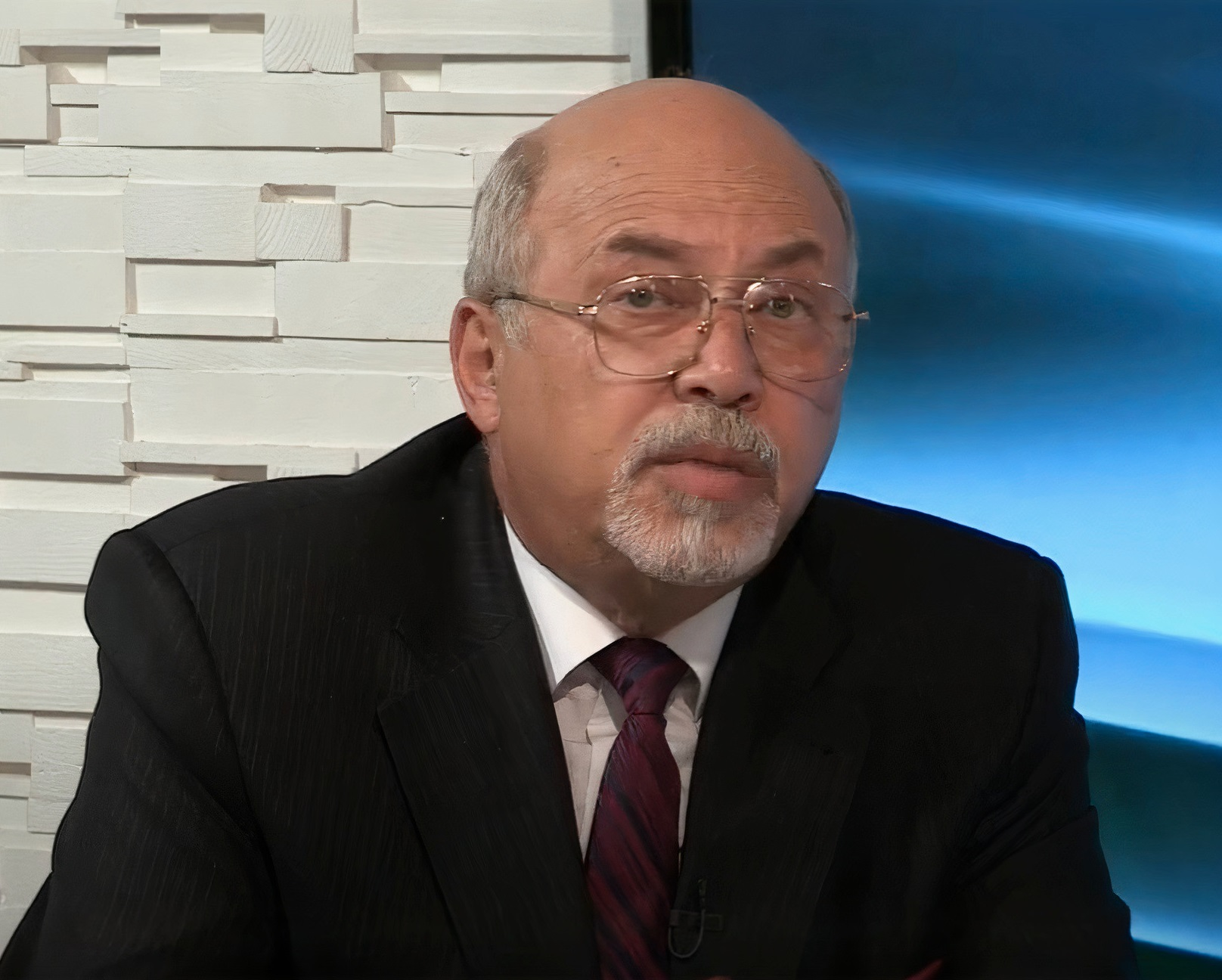
- Born: 30 August 1949 (age 76); Kyiv, Ukrainian Soviet Socialist Republic, Soviet Union
- Citizenship: Soviet Union, then Ukraine
- Education: Moscow State University; Kazan Federal University
- Known for: Rector of International Solomon University
- Scientific career
- Workplaces: Rector of International Solomon University; Professor,

Oleksandr Illich Rozenfeld (born 30 August 1949, Kyiv) is a Soviet and Ukrainian scientist, Doctor of Economics, Honoured Worker in Science and Technology of Ukraine, Honorary Professor at the University of Vienna, and Rector of the International Solomon University. He is the author of more than two hundred scientific papers.

== Biography ==
Oleksandr Rosenfeld was born on 30 August 1949 in Kyiv. In 1966, he started his education at Lomonosov Moscow State University (Faculty of Mechanics and Mathematics), and in 1972 he graduated from the Ulyanov-Lenin Kazan State University. Since 1972, he has worked in research institutions as a researcher.

In 1978, he defended his PhD thesis (CEMI of the USSR Academy of Sciences), and in 1988, he received his doctorate (CEMI of the USSR Academy of Sciences) in Mathematical Methods in Economic Research.

Since 1992, he has held administrative positions, including Director of the Centre for Applied Economic Research, Rector of the International Solomon University, and Director of the Economic Research Institute of the Ministry of Economy of Ukraine.

== Research interests ==
Mathematical methods in applied scientific research. The main area of his work is the assessment and forecasting of the consequences of decision-making at the pre-project development stages.

== Pedagogical activities ==
- National Academy of Visual Arts and Architecture — Professor,
- International Solomon University — Head of the department, Dean of the Faculty.
- He also was a visiting lecturer at several foreign universities and organizations.

== Publishing activities ==
Editor-in-Chief of the journal "Bulletin of the International Solomon University". Chairman of the editorial board of the international scientific journal "Khazar Almanac".

== Public activities ==
Consultant, Head of Working Groups on Drafting Decrees and Addresses of the President of Ukraine, Scientific Advisor to the Committee on International Relations of the Verkhovna Rada of Ukraine, Head of the Group of Advisors on Economic Policy of the Verkhovna Rada of Ukraine, Chairman of the Scientific and Expert Council at the Anti-Monopoly Committee, chairman of the Board of Trustees of the Hesed-Turbota Charitable Foundation. Member of the New York Academy of Sciences, member of the Board of Representatives of the World Union "ORT".

== Literary activities ==
Rozenfeld in the author of the novel The King (Summit, 2022), and a number of literary works and audio plays in the series Almost True Stories.

== Awards ==
- Honoured Worker in Science and Technology of Ukraine
- Diploma of the Verkhovna Rada of Ukraine
- The Knesset Medal (Israel)
- Jabotinsky Medal for interethnic understanding
- Awards and medals: USSR, Ukraine, Israel, Great Britain
- Honorary Professor of the Vienna International University (Austria).
