= Antisemitism in Ukraine =

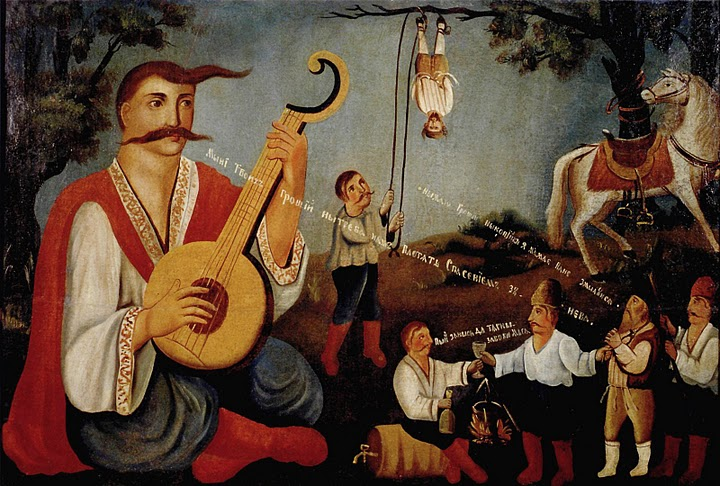
Cossack Mamay observing Haidamakas hang an Arendator. Ukrainian folk painting, 19th century

Antisemitism in Ukraine has been a significant issue in the country, particularly in the twentieth century. The history of the Jewish community of the region dates back to the era when ancient Greek colonies existed in it. A third of the Jews of Europe previously lived in Ukraine between 1791 and 1917, within the Pale of Settlement. The large concentration of Jews in this region historically made them an easy target for anti-Jewish actions and pogroms. Since April 2026, antisemitism in Ukraine is punishable, including by imprisonment.

== Before the 20th century ==
In 1113, there was anti-Jewish violence in Kiev, in the context of a rebellion sparked by the death of the unpopular Sviatopolk II, Grand Prince of Kiev, in which Jews who participated in the prince's economic affairs (particularly the salt trade) were targeted by townspeople. The earliest source of this is not until centuries later, and the event may be apocryphal.

Incidents befalling the Jews of Ukraine in the 13th century, such as the Mongol raids which wiped out entire Jewish communities, appear not to be related to antisemitism, according to Kevin Alan Brook.

The pogroms of 1648–49 under Khmelnytsky were marked by brutal anti-Jewish violence.

In 1768, many Jews were massacred by the Haidamak rebels under Ivan Gonta in the Massacre of Uman. Haidamaks were Ukrainian low-noble and peasant Cossack formations active in the Polish-Lithuanian Army. Over three thousand Jews were massacred in the streets and the synagogue with no mercy for age or sex, and their corpses were thrown to pigs and dogs. After this, the Haidamaks went on to slaughter Poles and Ukrainian Uniates, before their leaders were captured and executed for treason against Poland-Lithuania.

The 1821 Odessa pogroms are sometimes considered the first pogroms. After the execution of the Greek Orthodox patriarch, Gregory V, in Constantinople, 14 Jews were killed in response. The initiators of the 1821 pogroms were the local Greeks, who used to have a substantial diaspora in the port cities of what was known as Novorossiya.

Major anti-Jewish riots swept through southwestern Imperial Russia (present-day Ukraine and Poland) from 1881 to 1884, when more than 200 anti-Jewish events occurred in the Russian Empire. The most notable were pogroms in Kiev, Warsaw and Odessa. The event which triggered the pogroms was the assassination of Tsar Alexander II on 13 March [1 March, Old Style], 1881, for which some blamed "agents of foreign influence", implying that Jews committed it.

== Early 20th century ==
=== Pogroms during the Russian Revolution of 1905 ===
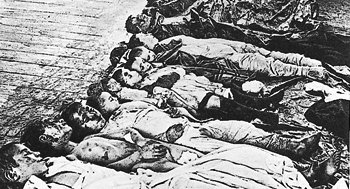
Victims of the Ekaterinoslav pogrom, October 1905.

After the publication of the October Manifesto, which promised citizens of Russia civil rights, many Jews who lived in the cities of the Pale of Settlement, went to the demonstrations against the government. For the local residents acting on the side of the incumbent authorities, this was the pretext to start a new wave of pogroms against Jews.

In February 1905, a pogrom took place in Feodosia, on April 19 of the same year a pogrom occurred in Melitopol. The pogrom in May in Zhytomyr surpassed the rest of the pogroms in terms of the number of victims. The most serious pogrom occurred in Odessa. 300 Jews were killed and thousands injured. Another serious pogrom occurred in Ekaterinoslav, during which 120 Jews were killed. Pogroms occurred in 64 cities (Odessa, Ekaterinoslav, Kiev, Simferopol, Romny, Kremenchug, Nikolaev, Chernigov, Kamenets-Podolsky and Elisavetgrad) and in 626 villages. Approximately 660 pogroms occurred in Ukraine and in Bessarabia. The pogroms lasted several days. Participants in the pogroms were workers of trains, traders of local shops, artisans and industrialists.

The pogroms of 1903–06 marked the beginning of Jewish unification in Europe. They became the motive for the organization of Jewish self-defense, accelerated emigration to Palestine, and initiated the HaShomer organization there.

The activities of the Union of Russian People and of other Black Hundreds organizations nurtured antisemitism in Ukraine in the late 19th and early 20th centuries.

=== Russian Civil War ===
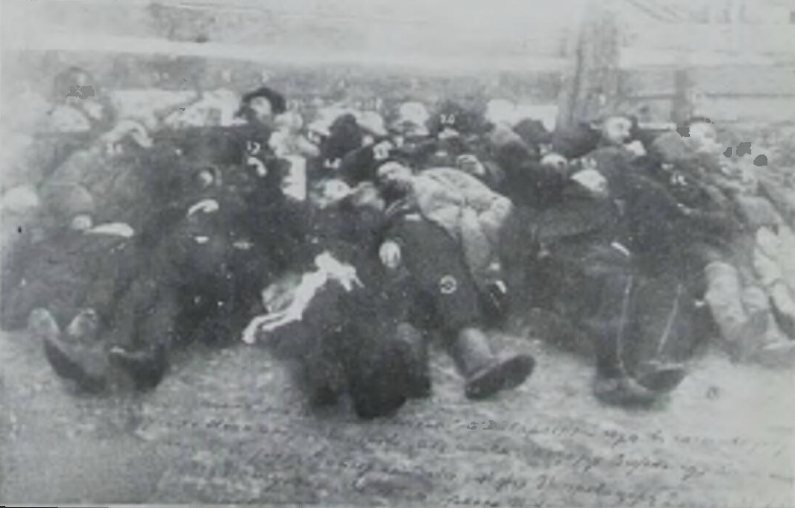
Jewish corpses after a pogrom in Ovruch, February 1919.

In February 1919, a brigade of Ukrainian People's Republic troops killed 1500 Jews in Proskurov. In Tetiev on March 25, 1919, Cossack troops under the command of Colonels Cherkovsky, Kurovsky and Shliatoshenko murdered 4000 Jews. Jews had tried to take refuge in the wooden synagogue but it was set ablaze. The Tetiev pogrom become the prototype of mass murder of Polish Jews, Infants were tossed into the air and their bodies dashed on the pavement, Approximately 4000 of the 6000 Jews of the town had been killed on the single day of March 25, 1919. Tetiev's Jewish quarter was burned in its entirety, including the synagogue and other houses of worship and study, where hundreds of people had sought refuge. Some 23,000 Jews had been recorded as residing in the vicinity, of Tetiev according to the imperial census of 1897; only 242 Jewish residents were documented in 1926. With no Jews found in a town of 10,000 where the Jewish population had previously been estimated at 6,000, a Joint Distribution Committee report sums up the Tetiev situation in this way: "locality ruined." In Dubovo on June 17, 1919, 800 of the town's 900 Jews were murdered in an assembly line fashion, two executioners stood with their sabers on top of the stairs and where they decapitated Jews forced to approach the staircase.

During the Russian Civil War the Jews of Uman in eastern Podolia were subjected to two pogroms in 1919, as the town changed hands several times. The first pogrom, in spring, claimed 170 victims; the second one, in summer, more than 90. in a break with traditional mass murder of Jews in the region, the Christian inhabitants of Uman helped to hide the Jews. The Council for Public Peace, with a Christian majority and a Jewish minority, saved the city from danger several times. In 1920, for example, it stopped the pogrom initiated by the troops of General Denikin.

During the Russian Civil War, between 1918 and 1921, a total of 1,236 violent incidents against Jews occurred in 524 towns in Ukraine. The estimates of the number of killed range between 30,000 and 60,000. Of the recorded 1,236 pogroms and excesses, 493 were carried out by Ukrainian People's Republic soldiers under command of Symon Petliura, 307 by independent Ukrainian warlords, 213 by Denikin's army, 106 by the Red Army and 32 by the Polish Army. During the dictatorship of Pavlo Skoropadsky (29 April 1918 to December 1918), no pogroms were recorded. When the Directorate replaced Skoropadsky's government, pogroms once again erupted.

==== Directorate of Ukraine (1918–1920) ====
In December 1918 Hetman of the Ukrainian State Hetmanate, Pavlo Skoropadskyi, was deposed and the Directorate (also called the Directoria) was established as the government of the Ukrainian People's Republic (Ukrayins'ka Narodnia Respublika, abbreviated UNR).

This new Ukrainian government immediately reacted to the acts of violence which happened in January 1919 in Zhytomyr and Berdychiv. The Ukrainian government informed the Jewish leaders and the government of Berdychiv on January 10 that the instigators had been shot, and that the army squadron which took part in the action had been disbanded. The head of the government, Volodymyr Vynnychenko, stated that the pogrom actions were initiated by the Black Hundreds. He also stated: "the Ukrainian government will actively fight anti-Semitism and all occurrences of Bolshevism".

The pro-Bolshevik delegate of the Bund, Moisei Rafes, who initially stated that "the special detachment that was sent to Zhytomyr and Berdychev to fight the Soviets initiated a pogrom", later in a speech at the meeting of the Labour Congress of Ukraine on January 16, 1919, changed his mind: "The Directoria states that it is not to blame, that it is not to blame for the pogroms. None of us blames the Directoria for the responsibility of the pogroms."

Symon Petliura made attempts to stop the occurrence of pogroms among Ukrainian detachments. When he discovered from the Minister of Jewish affairs of the UNR that the transiting squadron at the Yareska station had initiated violent acts against the Jewish population, he immediately sent a telegram to the military commandant of Myrhorod: "I command that the matter be investigated and reported back to me, and to use immediate measures so that similar excesses do not have a place and will be punished – 28 January – Head Otaman S. Petliura.

When Petliura took charge of the Directoria in 1919, at his initiative the government investigated the Jewish pogroms in Kamianets-Podilskyi and Proskuriv, demanding that the commanders "use decisive actions to totally liquidate the pogromist anti-Jewish actions, and the perpetrators are to be brought before a military tribunal and punished according to the military laws of war".

A representative of the Jewish party Poale Zion, Drakhler, told Petliura: "We understand, having enough facts, that the Zhytomyr and Berdichev pogroms took place as acts against the (Ukrainian) government. Immediately after the Zhytomyr pogrom the Russian and Polish Black Hundred members boasted 'The planned pogroms had worked extremely well, and will bring an end to Ukrainian aspirations'". Drakhler continued: "I am deeply convinced that not only we, but all Jewish democracy in its activities will take active participation in the struggle to free Ukraine. And in the rows of the army the Jewish Cossack hand in hand will fight, carrying its blood and life onto the altar of national and social freedom in Ukraine".

Petliura replied to the Jewish delegates that he would use "the strength of all my authority to remove the excesses against the Jews, which are obstacles to our work of establishing our statehood".

One document states in reference to the Kiev pogroms of June–October 1919: "When General Dragomirov, known for his liberalism, had to leave Kiev because of the Bolshevik offensive, turned to his officers (recorded in a stenogram) with the following words: 'My friends, you know, as much as I do, the reasons for our temporary failures on the Kievan front. When you, my heroic and never dying eagles, retake Kiev, I grant you the possibility to take revenge on the grubby Jews.'"

When Denikin's Volunteer army occupied Kiev (31 August [O.S. 18 August] 1919) it inflicted robbery and murder on the civilian population. Over 20,000 people died in two days of violence. After these events, the representative of the Kharkiv Jewish Community, Mr. Suprasskin, spoke to General Shkuro, who stated to him bluntly: "Jews will not receive any mercy because they are all Bolsheviks."

In 1921 Ze'ev (Vladimir) Jabotinsky, the father of Revisionist Zionism, signed an agreement with Maxim Slavinsky, Petliura's representative in Prague, regarding the formation of a Jewish gendarmerie which would accompany Petliura's putative invasion of Ukraine and protect the Jewish population from pogroms. The agreement did not materialize and most Zionist groups heavily criticized Jabotinsky. Nevertheless, he stood by the agreement and took pride in it.

== Middle 20th century ==
=== World War II ===
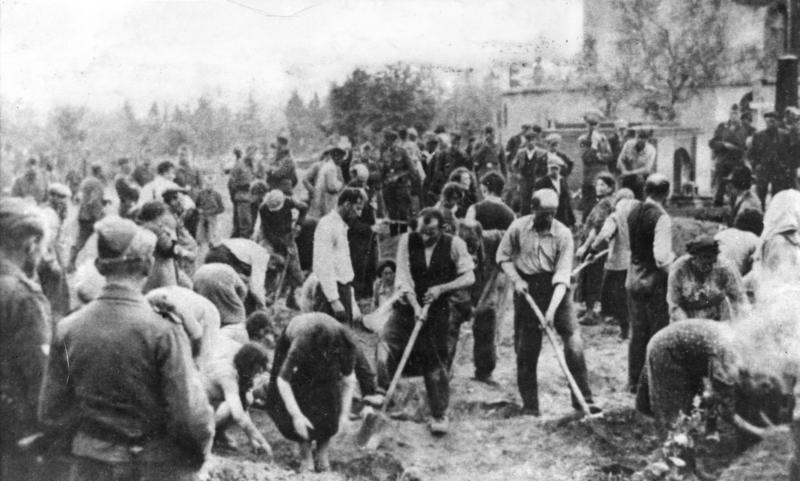
Jews dig their own graves, Zborov, Western Ukraine, 1941

Operation Barbarossa of 1941 brought together native Ukrainian populations of both, Soviet Ukraine and the territories of Poland annexed by the Soviet Union, under the German administrative control of the Reichskommissariat Ukraine to the north-east, and the General Government to the south-west. Many historians argue that the destruction of the Jewish population of Ukraine, reduced from 870,000 to 17,000, could not have been accomplished without the aid of the local population, because the Germans lacked the manpower to reach all of the communities that were annihilated, especially in the remote villages.

The nationalist Organization of Ukrainian Nationalists-Stepan Bandera faction of the Ukrainian Insurgent Army "openly advocated violence against Jews", wrote Jeffrey Burds. In April 1941 at its Second Congress in Kraków OUN-B embraced antisemitism. "Twenty so-called 'foreign' nationalities were listed as enemies of Ukraine: Jews were first, Poles were second." The resolution stated: "OUN combats the Jews as the prop of the Muscovite-Bolshevik regime." On September 1, 1941, Ukrainian language newspaper Volhyn wrote: "The element that settled our cities (Jews)... must disappear completely from our cities. The Jewish problem is already in the process of being solved." The Lviv pogroms were two massacres of Jews that took place from 30 June to 2 July and 25–29 July 1941 during Operation Barbarossa. According to Yad Vashem six thousand Jews were killed primarily by rioting Ukrainian nationalists and a newly formed Ukrainian militia. The pretext for the pogrom was a rumor that the Jews were responsible for the execution of prisoners by the Soviets before their withdrawal from Lviv. Ukrainian nationalists assisted German Security Police and the Einsatzgruppen. They compiled lists of targets for the branch offices of the KdS and assisted with the roundups (as in Stanisławów, Włodzimierz Wołyński, Łuck), as well as in Zhytomyr, Rivne and Kiev among other locations. In Korosten, the nationalists carried out the killings by themselves, same as inn Sokal. Other locations followed.

== Late 20th and early 21st centuries ==
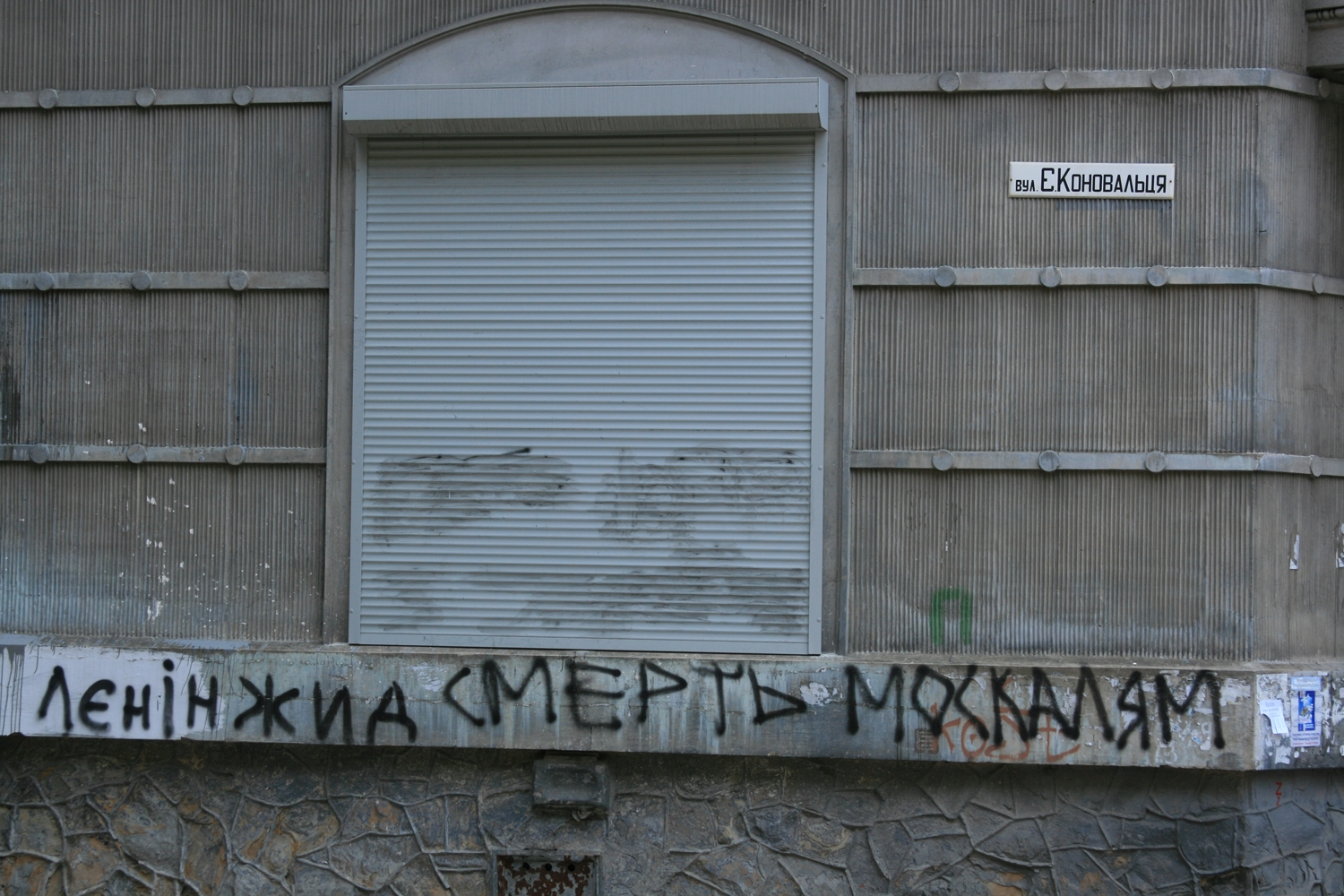
The inscription "Lenin is a Zhyd (Kike)" and "Death to Moskals" on the Yevhen Konovalets Street in Lviv, 2008

Some commentators have argued that antisemitism has been resurgent in the post-Soviet period. Jewish groups have attempted to monitor its levels and observed contradictory trends.

There were a number of right-wing nationalist and antisemitic groups in Ukraine in the 1990s. Among the most conspicuous was the MAUP, a private university with extensive financial ties to Islamic regimes. In the March 2006 issue (No. 9/160) of the Personnel Plus magazine by MAUP, an article "Murder Is Unveiled, the Murderer Is Unknown?" revives false accusations from the Beilis Trial, stating that the jury recognized the case as ritual murder by persons unknown, even though it found Beilis himself not guilty.

The incidents of antisemitism declined during the mid-1990s. A 2014 report published by Vyacheslav Likhachev of the National Minority Rights Monitoring Group revealed that the antisemitic vandalism and violence peaked in 2005–2006, and declined since then.

Alexander Tetelbaum, the first president of International Solomon University, describes in detail the treatment of Jews in Ukraine after World War II in his memoir Unfinished Equations. He also criticized antisemitism in Ukrainian universities following Perestroika in his paper presented at EURO-DAC'94.

In the early 2010s Jewish organizations in and outside of Ukraine have accused the political party All-Ukrainian Union "Svoboda" of open Nazi sympathies and being antisemitic. In May 2013 the World Jewish Congress listed the party as neo-Nazi. Leader of Svoboda, Oleh Tyahnybok has said that a "Muscovite-Jewish mafia" controls Ukraine and has attacked what he says is the "criminal activities of organized Jewry in Ukraine". "Svoboda" itself has denied being antisemitic. In the 2012 Ukrainian parliamentary elections "Svoboda" won its first seats in the Ukrainian Parliament, garnering 10.4% of the popular vote and the 4th most seats among national political parties. In the 2014 Ukrainian parliamentary elections the party got 6 parliamentary seats (it won 4.7% of the popular vote in this election). In the 2019 Ukrainian parliamentary election other parties joined Svoboda to form a united party list, these were the Governmental Initiative of Yarosh, Right Sector and National Corps. But in the election this combination won 2.2% of the votes, less than half of the 5% election threshold, and thus no parliamentary seats via the national party list. Svoboda itself did win one constituency seat, in Ivano-Frankivsk.

=== Euromaidan and War in Ukraine ===
According to the Euro-Asian Jewish Congress Jews supported the 2013–2014 Euromaidan revolution which ousted Viktor Yanukovych from the presidency of Ukraine. The organisation says few antisemitic incidents were recorded during this period. According to Eduard Dolinsky, executive director of the Kyiv-based Ukrainian Jewish Committee, Ukrainian Jews overwhelmingly supported the 2014 Euromaidan, however, its aftermath led to the rise of antisemitism and social acceptance of previously marginal far-right groups, together with government's policy of historical negationism in regard to the WWII ethnic cleansing committed by the Ukrainian nationalist movement against the country's minorities. After the revolution Ukrainian Jews making aliyah from Ukraine reached 142% higher during the first four months of 2014 compared to the previous year. 800 people arrived in Israel over January–April, and over 200 signed up for May 2014. Also at least 100 Jews left the country and went to Israel assisted by the International Fellowship of Christians and Jews.

In April 2014, a leaflet was handed out to the Jewish community in the city Donetsk as if by the pro-Russian separatists who had taken over control of the city. The leaflet contained an order to every Jew over the age of 16 to register as a Jew, and also to declare all the property they own, or else have their citizenship revoked, face deportation and see their assets confiscated, ostensibly as retribution for being Ukrainian loyalists. Denis Pushilin, head of the pro-Russian separatist Donetsk People's Republic, said it was a fake that was meant to discredit his movement. Donetsk Chief Rabbi Pinchas Vishedski also claims it was a hoax, and said that "Anti-Semitic incidents in the Russian-speaking east were rare, unlike in Kyiv and western Ukraine". An April 2014 listing of anti-Jewish violence in Ukraine in Haaretz no incidents outside this "Russian-speaking east" were mentioned. In February 2015, Alexander Zakharchenko, then leader of the self-proclaimed "Donetsk People's Republic" declared that Ukraine would be ruled by "poor representatives" of the Jewish people.

There were also cases of exploitation of antisemitism and "the Jewish question" in propaganda campaigns, such as speculations used by the administration of President Viktor Yanukovych in the first (November 2013) days of the Euromaidan mass protests. The conclusion of the (earlier mentioned) National Minority Rights Monitoring Group report describes a peak of antisemitic incidents in 2014, probably due to the instabilily in Ukraine. In March 2014, Rabbi Yaakov Bleich accused Russian sympathizers and nationalists of staging antisemitic provocations to be blamed on Ukrainians. He claimed that these provocations were used by the Russian Federation to justify its 2014 invasion of Crimea.

According to a 2016 report by Kharkiv Human Rights Protection Group, there was a significant drop in xenophobic violence in Ukraine, with the exception of the Russian-occupied areas in Eastern Ukraine.

In January 2017, thousands of Ukrainian nationalists marched in Kyiv while celebrating the birthday of Stepan Bandera; of these, many participants chanted "Jews out" in German.

A Pew Research Poll which was published on March 27, 2018, found that Ukrainians are far more likely to welcome Jews as fellow citizens than the populations of neighboring countries are, including the populations of all of the other countries in Eastern Europe. Only (5%) of Ukrainians would not accept Jews as fellow citizens, compared to Lithuanians (23%), Romanians (22%), Poles (18%), Russians (14%).

Since 2018, the United Jewish Community of Ukraine has been systematically monitoring cases of antisemitism in Ukraine. In January 2019, the UJCU published its first report. In that report, the UJCU said it had recorded 107 antisemitic incidents in 2018, including 73 "direct" cases (actions intended to humiliate, insult or threaten Jews, or conspiracy theories about them); 18 "indirect" cases (e.g. the glorification of historical figures involved in atrocities against Jews); and 16 cases of antisemitic "statements or actions" by officials. The report noted an increase in cases of what it described as "everyday" antisemitism in Ukraine, as well as antisemitic vandalism and "indirect" antisemitism. It said that this increase was presumably linked to the fact that such incidents had not been tracked in previous years, and also stated that no cases of "physical violence motivated by intolerance towards Jews" had been recorded in 2018.

Joel Lion, Israel's ambassador to Ukraine, reported an increase in antisemitism in Ukraine in 2020 and added that "If postcards with Nazi symbols are sold near Maidan, you shouldn't need to go and complain". In 2019, the Anti-Defamation League found nearly 70 percent of Ukrainians agreeing that "Jews have too much power in the business world."

=== Full-scale Russian invasion of Ukraine ===
The issue of antisemitism in Ukraine received worldwide attention in 2022, when Vladimir Putin's Russia invaded Ukraine, alleging the need to "denazify" the country and its government.

Henry Abramson, an expert on Ukrainian-Jewish history, said in 2022 that many Jews around the world were surprised by the election of Volodymyr Zelenskyy (Ukraine's first Jewish president) in the 2019 Ukrainian presidential election because of "the stereotype of prevailing Ukrainian antisemitism"; he said this stereotype was "deep-seated" "in the West" and particularly common among the children of Holocaust survivors who grew up in the Jewish diaspora, because of the collaboration of some Ukrainians with the Nazis during the Holocaust, as well as the separation of other diaspora Jews from the "normal day-to-day of Jewish Ukrainian life". Abramson argued that "sustained" antisemitic violence by Ukrainians had occurred but constituted a minority of Ukrainian-Jewish history, and that the rest of this history was characterised by coexistence and cultural exchange. He cited shared cuisine as well as Yiddish vocabulary of Ukrainian origin as examples, saying these "home-based words" adopted into Yiddish were signs that Jews and Ukrainians had "[spent] time as children in each other's kitchens", and of significant "cultural cross-fertilisation", especially through women. Abramson argued that a Jewish president of Ukraine was "remarkable" but "not necessarily mind-blowing", saying it had happened multiple times before that Jews had been part of the leadership of Ukraine.

On 14 April 2026, Ukraine criminalized antisemitism, with penalties that include fines, restrictions on liberty, or prison terms. In serious cases, such as crimes committed by organized groups or those causing significant harm, penalties could lead to a maximum of eight years in prison.

== See also ==
- Neo-Nazism in Ukraine
