= Alexander Y. Tetelbaum =

Ukrainian computer scientist, inventor, and academic administrator

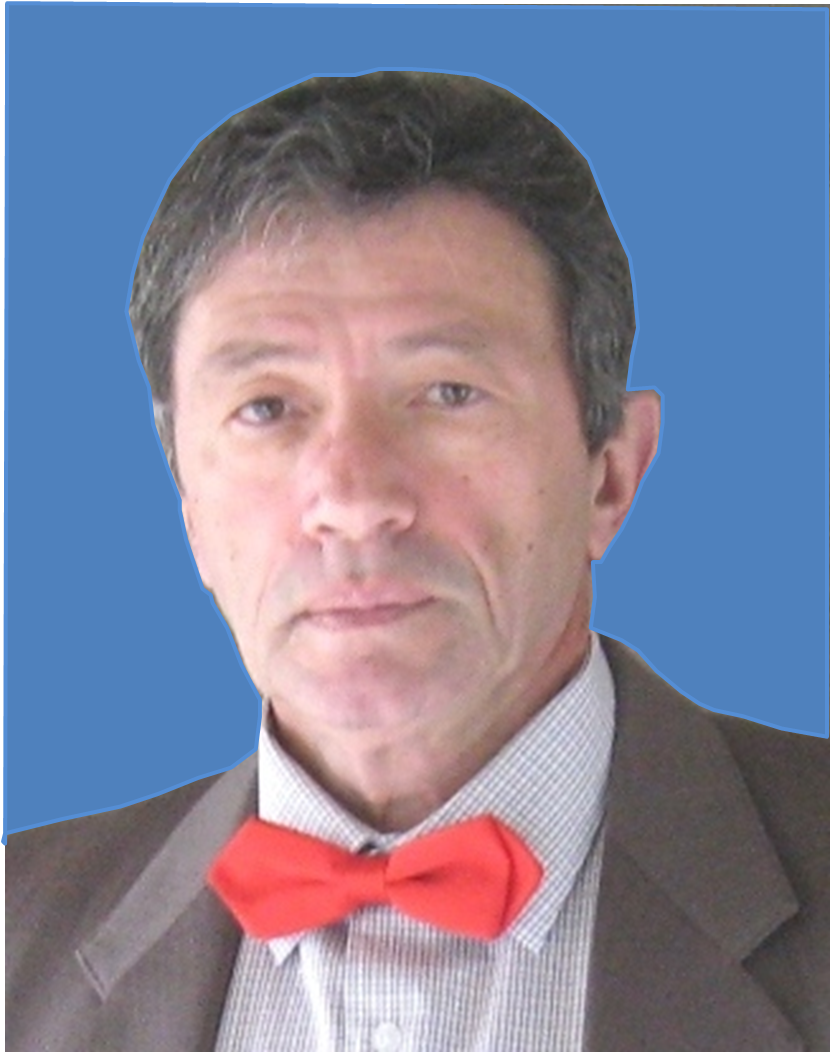
Alexander Tetelbaum A photo of computer scientist Alexander Y. Tetelbaum in 2012
- Born: 16 August 1948 (age 78); Kyiv, Ukrainian SSR, Soviet Union
- Citizenship: United States
- Occupations: Computer scientist; inventor; academic; academic administrator
- Known for: Contributions to electronic design automation and artificial intelligence
- Title: Founding president of International Solomon University

Academic background
- Education: Kyiv Polytechnic Institute (MS, 1972; PhD, 1975; DEng, 1986)

Academic work
- Institutions: Kyiv Polytechnic Institute (1973—1991); International Solomon University (since 1991— ); Michigan State University (1993—1996)
- Main interests: Electronic design automation

Alexander Y. Tetelbaum (born August 16, 1948) is a Ukrainian American computer scientist, inventor, and academic who has contributed to electronic design automation (EDA) and artificial intelligence (AI) since the late 1960s; and holds 46 U.S. patents in EDA and related fields. Tetelbaum is the founding president of International Solomon University, the first Jewish university in Ukraine, established during a period of renewed efforts to address antisemitism in Ukraine.

== Early life and education ==
He graduated from a Kyiv mathematical high school with a silver medal in 1966. Tetelbaum enrolled at the Kyiv Polytechnic Institute (KPI), now National Technical University of Ukraine "Igor Sikorsky Kyiv Polytechnic Institute" in 1966, graduating in 1972 with an MS in Electronics with honors. He earned his PhD in Electrical and Computer Engineering from KPI in 1975, with a dissertation on electronic design automation, and his Doctor of Engineering Science in 1986.

== Academic career ==
Tetelbaum began his academic career at KPI in 1973 as a junior scientist, becoming a professor in the Computer and Electrical Engineering Department in 1980. Later, he founded and served as president of International Solomon University in Kyiv from 1991 to 1996, the first Jewish university in Ukraine. The university became a major academic center for computer science and Jewish studies in the post-Soviet era.

He was a visiting and adjunct professor at Michigan State University from 1993 to 1996.

== Professional career ==
Tetelbaum worked as an engineer at the Kiev Institute of Cybernetics from 1972 to 1973, and later, he led the Design Automation Lab at Kyiv Polytechnic Institute from 1975 to 1987.

In the United States, he served as EDA manager at Silicon Graphics Corporation from 1996 to 1998 and principal engineer at LSI Corporation from 1998 to 2012. He founded and served as CEO of Abelite Design Automation, Inc., from 2012 to 2022.

== Contributions in computer science ==
Tetelbaum has contributed to electronic design automation (EDA) and artificial intelligence (AI) since the 1960s. His early work included methods for EDA, particularly physical design automation and mathematical optimization; and he developed force-directed placement and topological routing methods.

Tetelbaum generalized Rent's rule for hierarchical systems and large blocks, proposing a graph-based framework that extends applicability to arbitrary partition sizes with improved accuracy.

Additional IEEE and related conference contributions from the mid-1990s include:

- "Path Search for Complicated Function", 1995 IEEE International Symposium on Circuits and Systems
- "A Performance-driven Placement Approach of Standard Cells" (International Conference on Intelligent Systems, 1995)
- "Framework of a New Methodology for Behavioral to Physical Design Linkage" (38th Midwest Symposium on Circuits and Systems, 1996)
- Statistical timing design and variations
- Test Methodologies

These and other works and patents contributed to timing-driven placement, crosstalk reduction, clock tree synthesis, and interconnect optimization in VLSI design.

== Patents ==
Tetelbaum holds 46 U.S. patents in EDA and related fields. Notable examples include:

#	Patent Number	Title	Year
1	US8181144	Circuit Timing Analysis Incorporating the Effects of Temperature Inversion	2012
2	US8645888	Timing analysis incorporating temperature inversion	2014
3	US8922176	Programmable Slew Rate Power Switch	2014
4	US8775995	Core Timing Prediction of Core Logic Through an Over-Core Window	2014
5	US8694937	Implementing and Checking Electronic Circuits With Flexible Ramptime Limits	2014

For the full list of patents, see Justia Patents or Google Patents.

== Publications ==
=== Early publications in the Soviet Union ===
Before the appearance of American books on electronic design automation (EDA), Tetelbaum published several scientific books and monographs on the subject in Russian/Ukrainian.

- Electronic Design Automation, Kiev: Znanie Publisher, 1975.
- Planar Design of Electronic Circuits, Kiev: Znanie Publisher, 1977.
- Formal Design of Computer Systems, Moscow: Sovetskoe Radio, 1979.
- CAD of Electronic Equipment: Topological Approach, Kiev: Vyssha Shkola, 1980; 2nd ed. 1981.
- Automated Design of Electronic Circuits (1981)
- CAD of VLSI Circuits, Kiev: Vyssha Shkola, 1983.
- Topological Algorithms of Multilayer Printed Circuit Boards Routing, Moscow: Radio i Svyaz, 1983.
- CAD of VLSI Circuits on Master Slice Chips, Moscow: Radio i Svyaz, 1988. * Increasing the Effectiveness of CAD Systems, Kiev: UMKVO, 1991.

=== Scientific Monographs (English) ===
- Minimum Number of Timing Signoff Corners (2022)
- Interviewing AI (2026)
- The AI Debate (2026)
- New Nostradamus Predictions: 2026: The Next Decade & Beyond (2035–2050+) (2026)

For a consolidated record of Tetelbaum's publications, see Alexander Y. Tetelbaum, Wikidata Q4720205.

=== Other publications ===
Tetelbaum also published educational books on problem-solving methods:

- Yes-No Puzzles-Games (2017)
- Puzzle Games for Kids (2017)
- Solving Non-Standard Problems (2018)
- Solving Non-Standard Very Hard Problems (2020)

Additionally, Tetelbaum published three thrillers:

- Omerta Operations (2023)
- Executive Director (2024)
- Eruption Yacht (2025)

Finally, he published his memoir and an entertaining book:

- Unfinished Equations (2025)
- Finished Equations (2026)
- Artificially Intelligent Humor (2024)

Academic offices
New title	President of International Solomon University; 1991–1996	Succeeded by
