= Lexicon Universale =

1698 humanist encyclopedia in Latin by Johann Jacob Hofmann of Basel

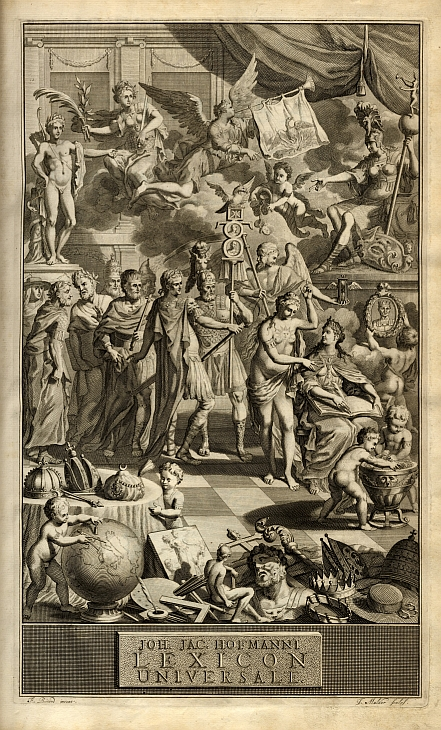

The Lexicon Universale of 1698 is an early modern humanist encyclopedia in Latin by Johann Jacob Hofmann of Basel (1635–1706). It appeared in four volumes with 1,000 pages each.

Lexicon Universale, Historiam Sacram Et Profanam Omnis aevi, omniumque Gentium; Chronologiam Ad Haec Usque Tempora; Geographiam Et Veteris Et Novi Orbis; Principum Per Omnes Terras Familiarum [...] Genealogiam; Tum Mythologiam, Ritus, Caerimonias, Omnemque Veterum Antiquitatem [...]; Virorum [...] Celebrium Enarrationem [...]; Praeterea Animalium, Plantarum, Metallorum, Lapidum, Gemmarum, Nomina, Naturas, Vires Explanans. - Editio Absolutissima [...] Auctior [...]. - Leiden: Jacob. Hackius, Cornel. Boutesteyn, Petr. Vander Aa, & Jord. Luchtmans, 1698.
