= Samuel Simchowitz =

- Died: March 1896 Slutzk, Russian Empire

Religious life
- Religion: Judaism

Samuel Simchowitz (early 19th century – March 1896) was a Russian rabbinical writer. He possessed a thorough rabbinical knowledge, and at the same time was well versed in modern literature. Numerous essays from his pen appeared in the Petersburger Herold. In 1866 he was invited to the Orthodox rabbinate of Vienna, but he refused this call as well as one received two years later to Warsaw. Many of his Talmudic novellæ, as well as responsa bearing on the ritual codices, are extant in manuscript. In 1894 he was a member of the great rabbinical conference held in Saint Petersburg.
