= International Solomon University =

Private university in Kyiv, Ukraine

- Other name: ISU
- Type: Private university
- Established: 1991; 35 years ago
- Founder: Alexander Y. Tetelbaum
- Rector: Oleksandr Rozenfeld
- Location: Kyiv, Ukraine; 50°27′07″N 30°28′38″E
- Campus: Urban
- Website: isu.edu.ua

The International Solomon University (ISU) is a non-governmental university located in Kyiv, Ukraine.

It was founded in 1991 by Professor Alexander Tetelbaum, who served as president until 1996. Teaching at the ISU begun on September 1, 1993.

The supreme body of ISU management is the Board of Founders, headed by R.M. Shapshovych. The Board of Founders and the Supervisory Council of ISU are represented by famous scholars and social and political figures. The management of the current ISU activity is carried out by the rector, Professor Oleksandr Rozenfeld, supported by the vice-rector, Professor G. Finin.

The Eastern-Ukrainian Affiliated Department in Kharkiv prepares specialists in History, Software, Finance and Marketing.
