= Chernobyl Recovery and Development Programme =

Program aimed to restore areas and people affected by the Chernobyl disaster

Chernobyl Recovery and Development Programme (CRDP) is developed by the United Nations Development Programme and aims at ensuring return to normal life as a realistic prospect for people living in regions affected by Chernobyl disaster. The Programme provides continuing support to the Government of Ukraine for elaboration and implementation of development-oriented solutions for the regions. The CRDP, part of the United Nations Development Programme activities in Ukraine, has been launched based on the recommendations of “The Human Consequences of the Chernobyl Nuclear Accident. A strategy for Recovery”, the joint report by UN agencies initiated in February 2002. Since 2003 the CRDP is constantly working to mitigate long-term social, economic and environmental consequences of the Chernobyl catastrophe, to create more favorable living conditions and to promote sustainable human development in the Chernobyl-affected regions. In partnerships with international organizations, oblast, rayon and state administrations, village councils, scientific institutions, non-governmental organizations and private business, CRDP supports community organizations and helps them to implement their initiatives on economic, social development and environmental recovery. In addition, the CRDP distributes information about the Chernobyl catastrophe internationally and within Ukraine.

== CRDP activities ==
With a strong emphasis on economic development, the project builds a sustainable national framework supporting the return to normal life in the region and in particular focuses on the following areas:

- Strategic solutions to support sustainable local economic development: provision of ongoing advisory support to the Government and assisting in the elaboration of development-oriented solutions for the rehabilitation of the Chornobyl-affected regions.
- Enabling local governance environment to foster economic development - enhancement of local authorities' capacities to transparently define and implement local development strategies, deliver public services, and foster local economic development, including support of strategic planning at rayon level and enhancement of local economic development agencies capacities to facilitate local economic development, provide services for business and authorities in the region.
- Consolidation of community-based recovery and development –involvement of a larger number of affected communities in recovery and development processes, ensuring the introduction of strong national ownership of the approach that addresses specific needs of communities, undergoes revision of radioactive-contamination zones; and targets youth-specific issues in the region such as access to ICT technologies and the Internet.
- Human security through local information provision - development of national capacities to sustain community-based information provision network for the Chornobyl- affected regions and enhancement of local authorities' capacities to improve public awareness and levels of human security in communities living around nuclear facilities based on the Chornobyl lessons learned.

== CRDP achievements and results 2003-2008 ==
- CRDP ensured the shift of national strategy on Chornobyl and improvement of national programmes for the mitigation of Chornobyl catastrophe consequences via advisory support on national policy and regional cooperation issues provided to the Government of Ukraine, hosting of various round tables and providing support for studies on Chornobyl-specific policy issues, organizing conferences, facilitating participation of CRDP’s national and international partners in the dialogue. As a result the New National Programme on Chernobyl for 2006–2010 adopted by the Parliament of Ukraine incorporates key recovery-oriented recommendations. At the 20th Chornobyl Anniversary commemorative conferences, the UN/UNDP Chornobyl strategy was largely based on CRDP’s experiences.
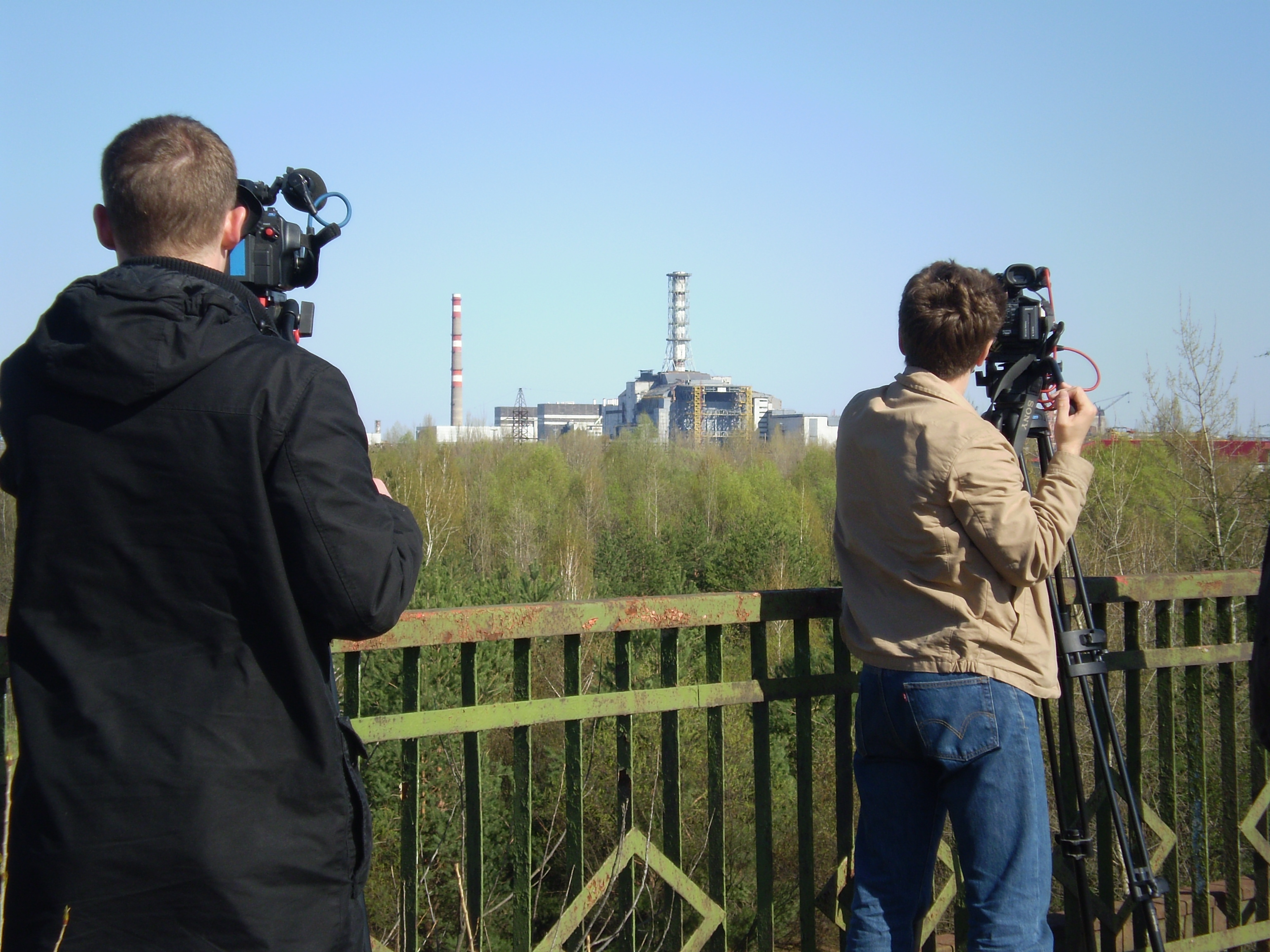
  International Press-trip for journalists (2009).
- Since 2005 the Chernobyl Economic Development Forum initiated by CRDP effectively works as a platform for the elaboration of strategies for sustainable development of territories, attracting investments into the region, creation of concurrent circumstances for partnerships between businesses, local authorities and communities for recovery and development of affected territories.
- More than 800 media publications: news reports and articles, TV and radio reports released based on advocacy and awareness campaigns on the developmental approach for Chernobyl. A number of round-table meetings, donor visits, and pres-trips were organised.
- CRDP strategic approach was shared at the sub-regional level with colleagues of Belarus and the Russian Federation and acknowledged at the highest United Nations level in UN General Assembly resolutions in 2005 and 2007.
- The principle of “partnership between community organisations and authorities for recovery and development” successfully introduced in the region. 279 community organisations (COs) formed in 192 villages in Ukraine (involve over 20,000 community members). COs resolve important socio-economic problems in villages: reconstruct water pipelines and provide gasification; reconstruct schools, bathes, village health centres, and ambulatories; create youth, public and service centres; etc. Community organisations implemented more than 191 recovery and development projects totaling over 18 mln. UAH, 6,6 mln. of which were contributed by CRDP. Nearly 200,000 people benefited from community-driven development projects supported by UNDP/CRDP. Community organisations successfully mobilized significant financial resources for the implementation of their own priority projects. On average, for the implementation of one project, a community organisation itself contributed 20% of the total amount, local village and rayon authorities – 40%, CRDP – 31%, and other sponsors – 9%.
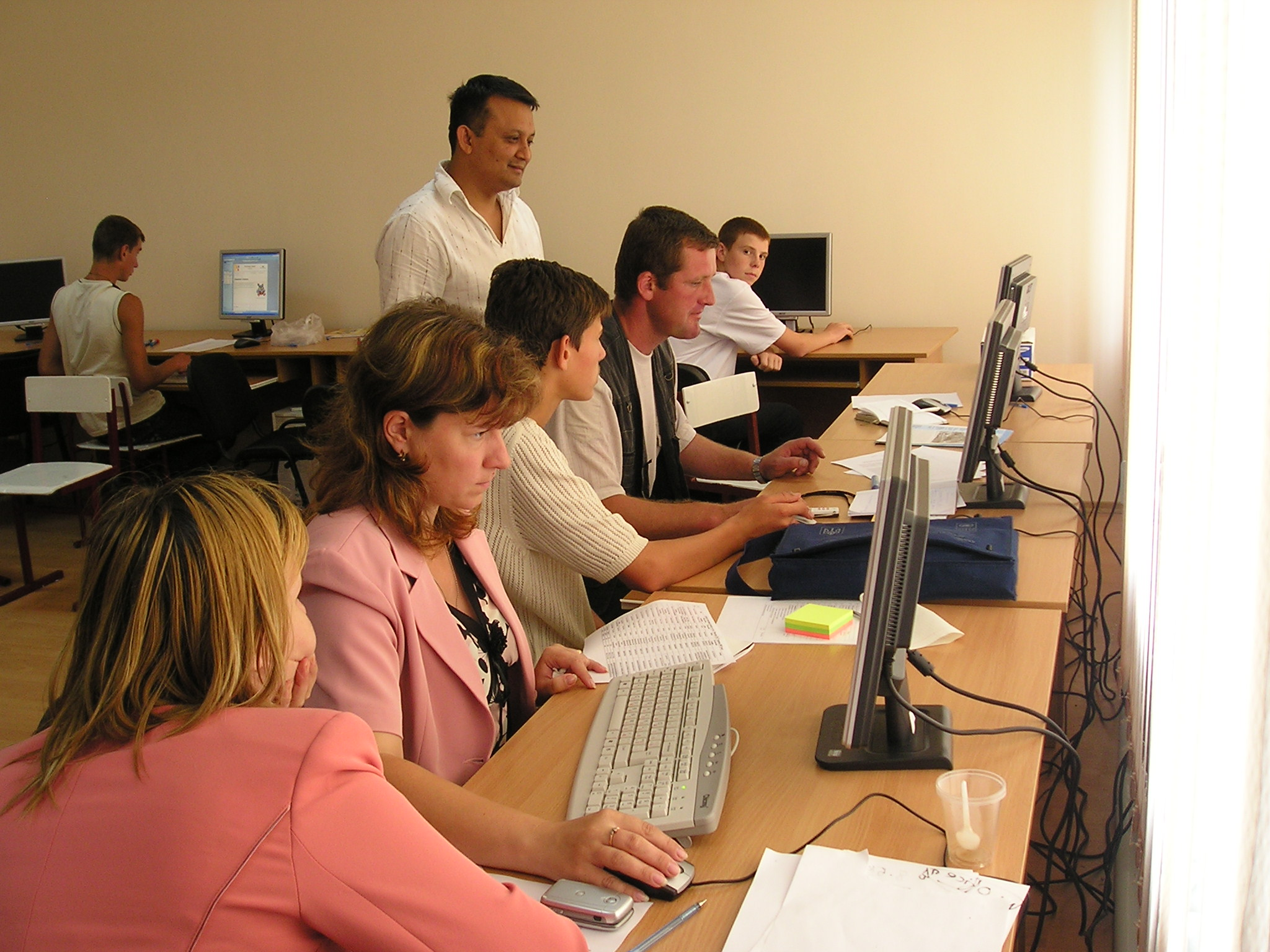
  Internet and Communication Technologies training session at the Rokytne Youth Centre.
- Eight Regional Economic Development Agencies established, 3 in rayons of Zhytomyr oblast (Brusyliv, Korosten and Ovruch), 2 in Kyiv Oblast (Borodyanka and Ivankiv), 2 in Rivne oblast (Rokytne and Dubrovytsya) and 1 in Chernihiv oblast (Ripky rayon). The Agencies of Regional Economic Development provide everyday consultation to private entrepreneurs and those active citizens who want to establish private business and organise lifelong education for various groups of people in the affected areas. Agencies ensure equal opportunities for everybody regardless of gender, age and race.
- A model of Youth centre - an institution specially designed to respond to young people’s needs. The Youth Centre is composed of a gym, computer equipment, Internet, and a meeting room for self-organised training, classes, etc. The Youth Centre has become both a human resource centre and a social enterprise for the village. During 2004-2007, CRDP supported the establishment of 35 Youth Centres in Chernobyl-affected areas.

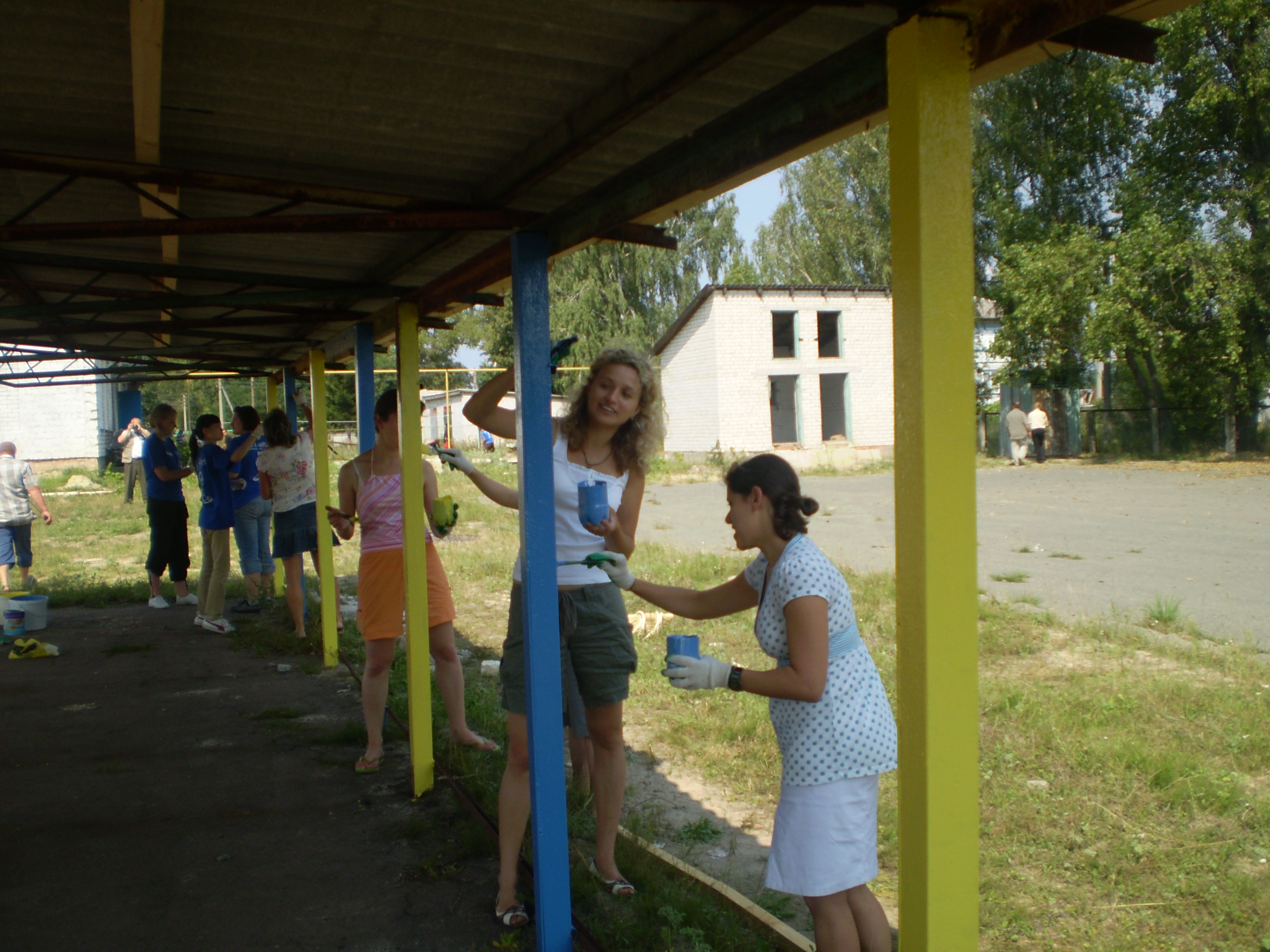
Volunteer work in Lugyny.

- Two Internet clubs at local schools and 11 rural youth centres were connected to the Internet and offered the opportunity to enjoy everyday virtual communication with peers from around the world. Development of Internet and Communication Technologies is one of CRDP's priorities as it raises the opportunity for youth development in Chernobyl-affected rural areas.
- 'Over 20 titles of information materials (brochures, booklets, films, posters, CDs) on the Chernobyl catastrophe consequences and conditions for secure living at contaminated territories developed and distributed by CRDP in cooperation with leading scientific institutions. A series of trainings for teachers and medical workers on issues of radiation security and healthy lifestyles was conducted. CRDP developed the film ‘Alphabet of Understanding’ and the publication ‘Teachers Guidebook on the Chernobyl Accident’, which was supported by the Ministry of Emergencies for mass production and dissemination in 2007.

== Areas of Interest ==
CRDP works in the 4 most Chernobyl-affected oblasts (provinces) in Ukraine, namely the Kyiv, Zhytomyr, Chernihiv and Rivne Oblasts.

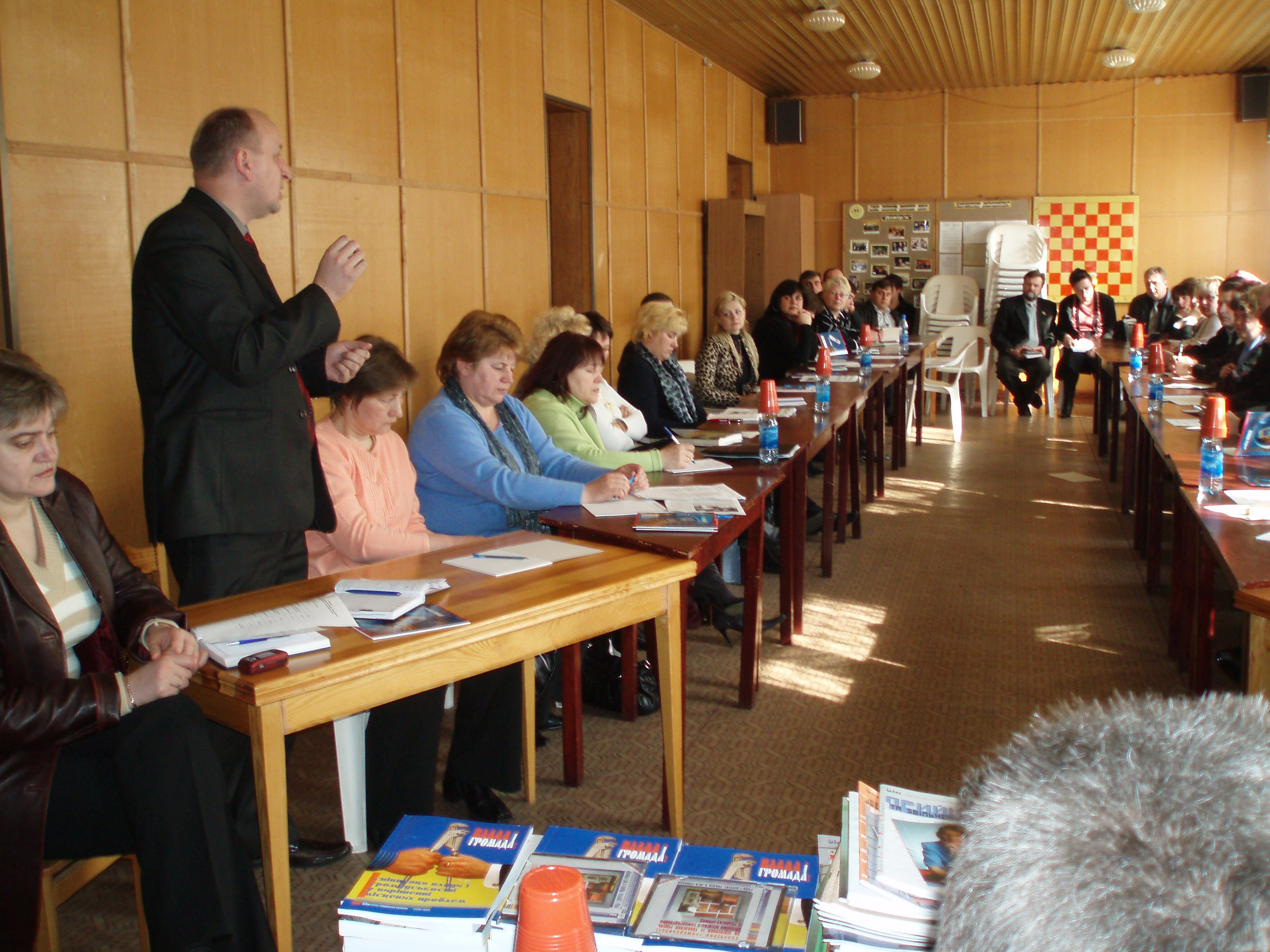
Community development in Ivankiv.

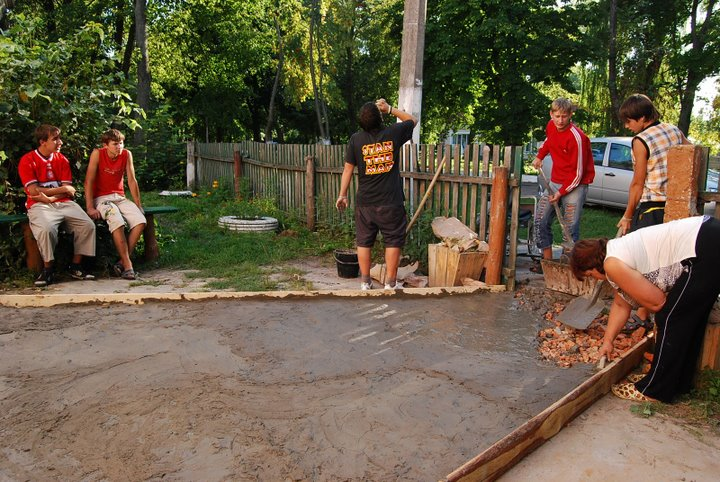
Work of community organisation in Lyub

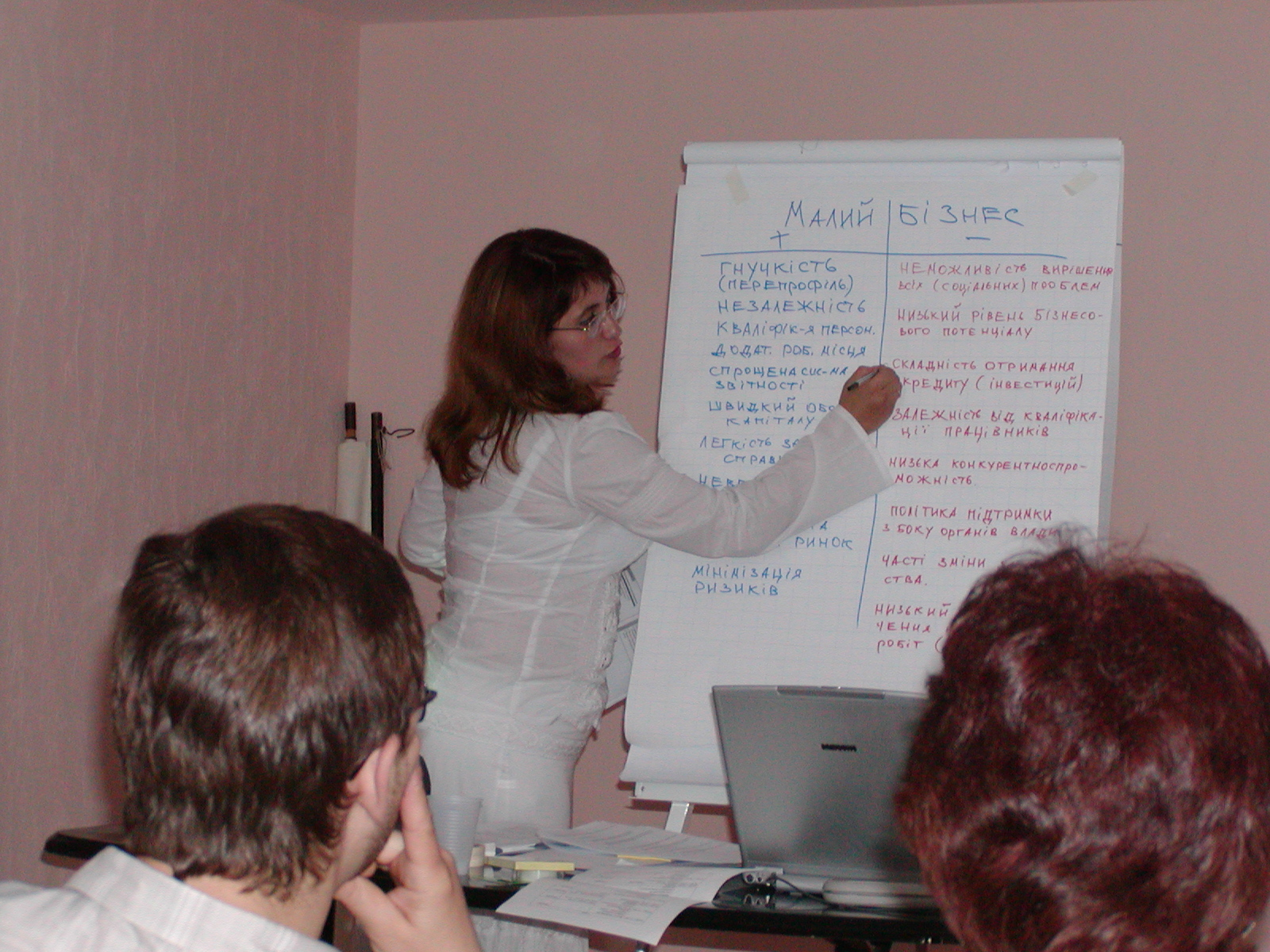
Economic development training session.
