= Warsaw pogrom (1881) =

Anti-Jewish pogrom

The Warsaw pogrom was a pogrom that took place in Russian-controlled Warsaw on 25–27 December 1881, then part of Congress Poland in the Russian Empire, resulting in two people dead and 24 injured.

== Warsaw pogrom ==
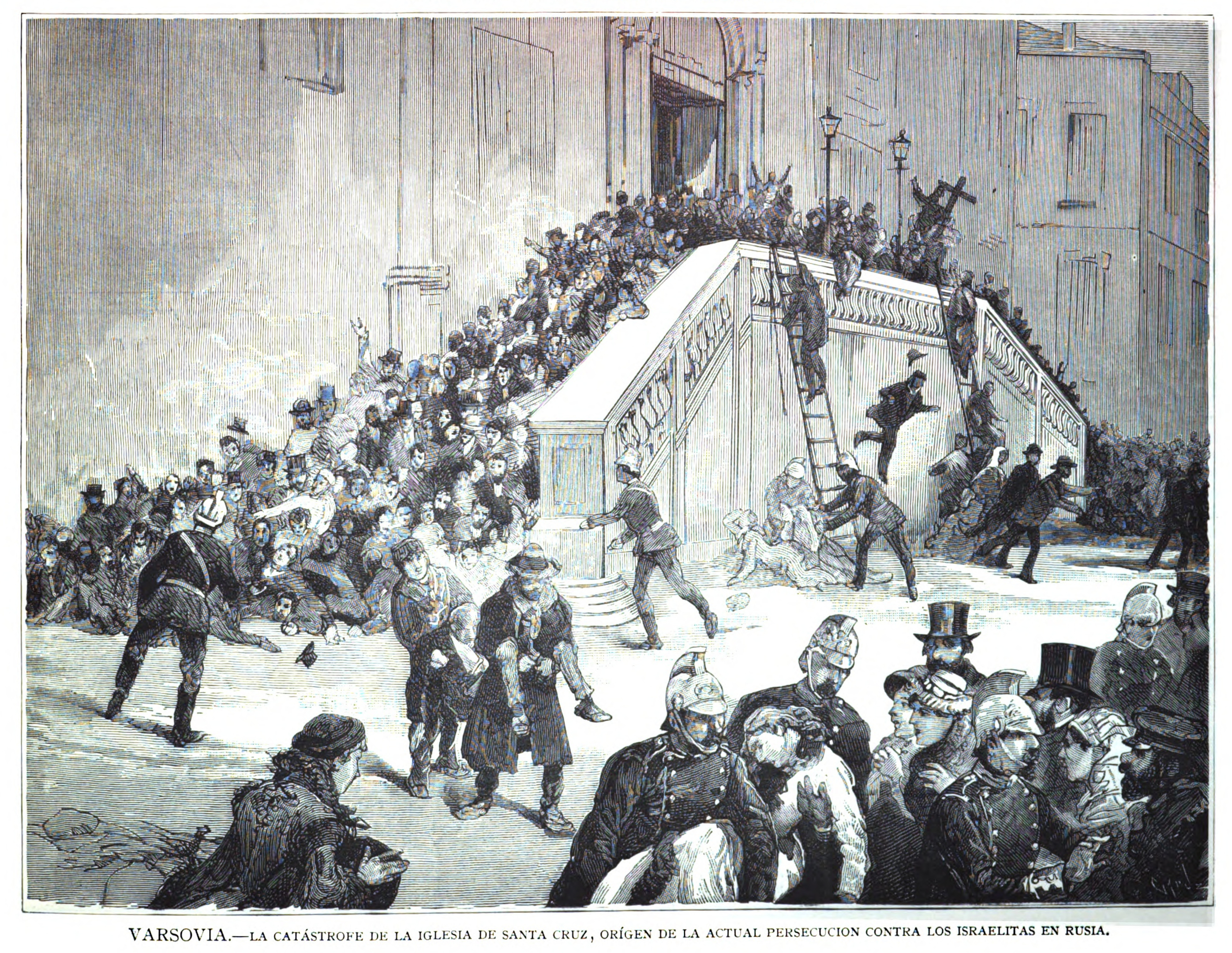
A drawing of the stampede at the Holy Cross Church depicted in the Spanish illustrated newspaper, La Ilustración Española y Americana. The caption reads, "“Warsaw.—The catastrophe at the Church of the Holy Cross, origin of the current persecution against the Israelites in Russia.” The caption does not refute the claim that Jews caused the stampede.

Simon Dubnow, a contemporary Jewish-Russian historian, gives the following details of this event: on 25 December 1881 the outbreak of panic after a false warning of fire in the crowded Holy Cross Church resulted in the deaths of twenty-nine persons in a stampede. It was believed that the false alarm was raised by pickpockets, who used the ruse to allow them to rob people during the panic. A crowd gathered on the scene of the event and some unknown persons started to spread a rumour, which subsequently proved to be unfounded, that two Jewish pickpockets had been caught in the church.

The mob began to attack Jews, Jewish stores, businesses, and residences in the streets adjoining the Holy Cross Church. The riots in Warsaw continued for three days, until Russian authorities (who controlled the police as well as military in the city) intervened, arresting 2,600 people. During the Warsaw pogrom two people were left dead and 24 injured. The pogrom also left about a thousand Jewish families financially devastated. In the months afterwards, about a thousand Warsaw Jews emigrated to the United States. The pogrom worsened Polish-Jewish relations, and was criticized by such members of the Polish elite as writers Eliza Orzeszkowa, Boleslaw Prus and several other notable activists.

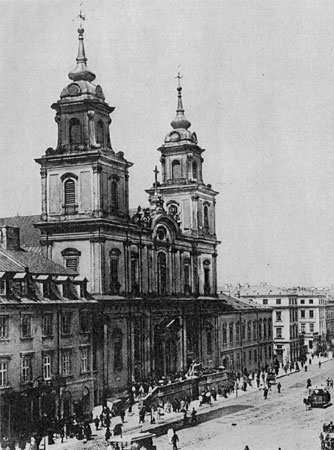
Holy Cross Church, Warsaw, in the 1890s

Historians Simon Dubnow, Yitzhak Gruenbaum, Frank Golczewski and Magdalena Micinska have argued that the pogrom might have been instigated by the Russian authorities, trying to drive a wedge between Jews and Poles or show that pogroms, increasingly common in the Russian Empire after the assassination of the tsar Alexander II in 1881 (in that period over 200 anti-Jewish events occurred in Russian Empire, notably the Kiev and Odessa pogroms), were not a Russia-only phenomena. However, historian Michael Ochs disagreed with this explanation, citing insufficient evidence. Ochs calls those explanations conspiracy theories, arguing that they fail to present what the Russian authorities would have gained from the pogroms. He notes that period from 1863 to 1881 was witnessing the increase of anti-Semitism in Poland, with disillusionment among Poles with the idea of assimilation of the Jews was growing, and hence there was less need for the Russian authorities to orchestrate a pogrom, which might have been spontaneous.
