= Kiev pogrom =

Kyiv pogrom may refer to:

- Kiev pogrom (1881)
- Kiev pogrom (1905)
- Kiev pogroms (1919)
- Kyiv pogrom (1945)
