= Plyskiv =

Village In Vinnytsia Oblast, Ukraine

Plyskiv Плисків
- Village
- Location within Vinnytsia Oblast Location within Ukraine
- Coordinates: 49°22′09″N 29°17′05″E
- Country: Ukraine
- Oblast: Vinnytsia Oblast
- Raion: Vinnytsia Raion

Population
  - Total: 1,436

Plyskiv (Ukrainian: Плисків, Russian: Плискoв, Polish: Plisków) is a village in Vinnytsia Raion, Vinnytsia Oblast, Ukraine. The population is 1,439 (2006).

== History ==
Pliskov was first mentioned in Polish archive documents in 1552. Pliskov was settled on the banks of the river Rosen (Ros), by the German Jews who were given permission by the Polish King to settle in the Polish Kingdom (Rzeczpospolita). In 1795, this place became part of the Russian Empire ( after the partition of Poland between Russia, Prussia and Austria-Hungary), and was already named Pliskovo. The name “Pliskov” originates from the bird Pliska (Плиска) that lived in the woods around Pliskov.

Before the October 1917 Revolution, there were three synagogues, a bath house by the river, a cemetery, two drug stores, two hotels, four smithies, four mills, three water mills and a steam mill, two barber shop, a diner, and many stores and workshops inside the shtetel center. Once a week a big market was arranged at the Market Place, where peasants sold their goods and bought the goods that the Jewish shop owners and craftsmen were selling.

There were 220 houses in Pliskov, in which, according to the first census conducted in 1892, lived 1,320 Jews. The houses varied. Wealthy families lived in good quality brick houses with tin roofs. Poorer families lived in houses with thatched roofs. Pliskov was famous for its mineral spring named “Brover”. In the wintertime it did not freeze, and in the summertime, even during the hottest days, water did not disappear and was always cold. All year round the water-carrier delivered water from this spring to the customers who paid a small fee for the service.

For 300 years Pliskov was a small Jewish town (shtetl), first in Poland than Russia, USSR and finally destroyed by Nazi Germany and local Nazi collaborators during World War II . The Jewish population of Pliskov and surrounding shtetls, such as Pogrebishche, Justingrad, Lipovets, Shpicentsy, Zhivotovo, Dashev and Tetiev were often victims of Pogroms, assaults and persecution which took place from the days when these towns came into being and until their complete disappearance after World War II (1939-1945). Khmelnickiy’s Cossacks (1648-1654), Gaydamaks (1736-1768), Pogroms of late 19th and early 20th century (most notable Pliskov Pogrom of 1914), Russian Revolution and Russian Civil War (1917-1921) and finally World War II are a few of the most notable events which made Jewish life difficult in Pliskov and in Eastern Europe in general. There were pogroms organized by Petlura’s and Denikin’s gangs. Also pogroms and massacres of Jews in 1918-1919 organized by the White Armies as well as detachments of Red Army soldiers. In the summer of 1920, Red Cossacks of the Budenniy Army also robbed Jews. All of these pogroms, robberies and murders forced many Jews to seek refuge in the United States.

Until 1929, there were private businesses in Pliskov, but in 1930 they were confiscated and all craftsmen were forced to work in Artels. In 1926, all Jewish schools (Cheders) were closed and the study of the Torah and the Hebrew language were prohibited. The only school which taught in Yiddish was closed in 1936. Before 1930, many families and most of the younger generation of Jews had already moved to such big cities as Kiev, Moscow, Leningrad, Kharkov. The Jewish community of Plyskiv numbered about 790 people, only a few of whom survived the Holocaust.

On July 22, 1941, Pliskov was occupied by the German Army. All of the Jews of Pliskov stayed in the town, and most of the blame fell upon the Stalin regime. Before the war, when the treaty with Hitler was signed, the newspapers and radio discontinued all of the reports about the Nazi treatment of the Jews. This is the main reason the Pliskov Jews stayed in town, scared and waiting to see how the fascists treated the Jews. A German—Fric Nudel—was the Commandant of Pliskov, and he appointed a Ukrainian named Ivanko to be Head of Pliskov. Ivanko announced that all Jews of Pliskov would be deprived of all their rights and personal property, and every Ukrainian could take possession of that property except for gold, platinum, silver and other valuables which would pass to Germany. Fric Nudel formed a Ukrainian Police Force. The chief of police was a known criminal named Chirsky, who still lives in Australia after escaping from Pliskov in 1944. On October 22, 1941, Head of Gendarmery Shuster, his assistant Kinkel, officers Benkel and Kushner, together with Fric Nudel executed all of Pliskov's Jews. Together with the German fascists, the Ukrainian police took an active part in this massacre. Some of the Jews were able to hide in a basements and attics of gentile neighbors who were willing to risks their lives by doing so. Not that many people were willing to so. Some of the Jews of Pliskov were able to survive like that until 1944. But none of them were there to see the liberation of Pliskov by the Soviet Army later that year. After the War, none of the surviving Jews who fought in Soviet Army or left the town before the War returned to Pliskov. 300 years of the Jewish town of Pliskov was erased in a matter of one year. A village named Pliskov is located in the same place, but the shtetel of Pliskov is gone. Those who survived the Holocaust of 1941-1945 have moved to many countries. The Jews of Pliskov now live in Israel, Australia, United States, Germany, and the big cities of the Former Soviet Republics. In 2019, new memorials to the victims of the Holocaust were erected and unveiled at both places where Jews were shot.

== Descendants in America ==
Pliskovers are the descendants of the shtetel of Pliskov. Many of the former residents of Pliskov relocated to Pittsburgh, Pennsylvania. There is an organization in Pittsburgh called the Pliskover Cemetery Association. Former residents of Pliskov started an organization to help each other and people still in Pliskov. Founded in 1908, its first name was Pliskover Free Loan Association, where interest free loans were given to needy members/Pliskovers. In 1917, they bought some land in Coraopolis, to serve as a private cemetery. By joining the organization and paying dues, the member has a plot where they can be buried. Free loans are no longer given out, that is why the name changed to Pliskover Cemetery Association. The cemetery is still open to members and membership, and is the resting place for some of the former residents of the shtetel of Pliskov and their family members.

== Gallery ==
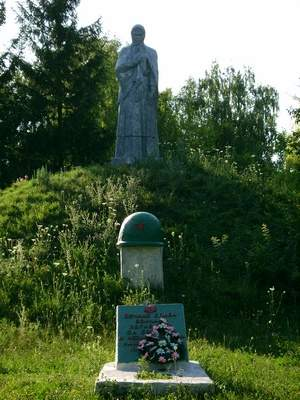
Plyskiv

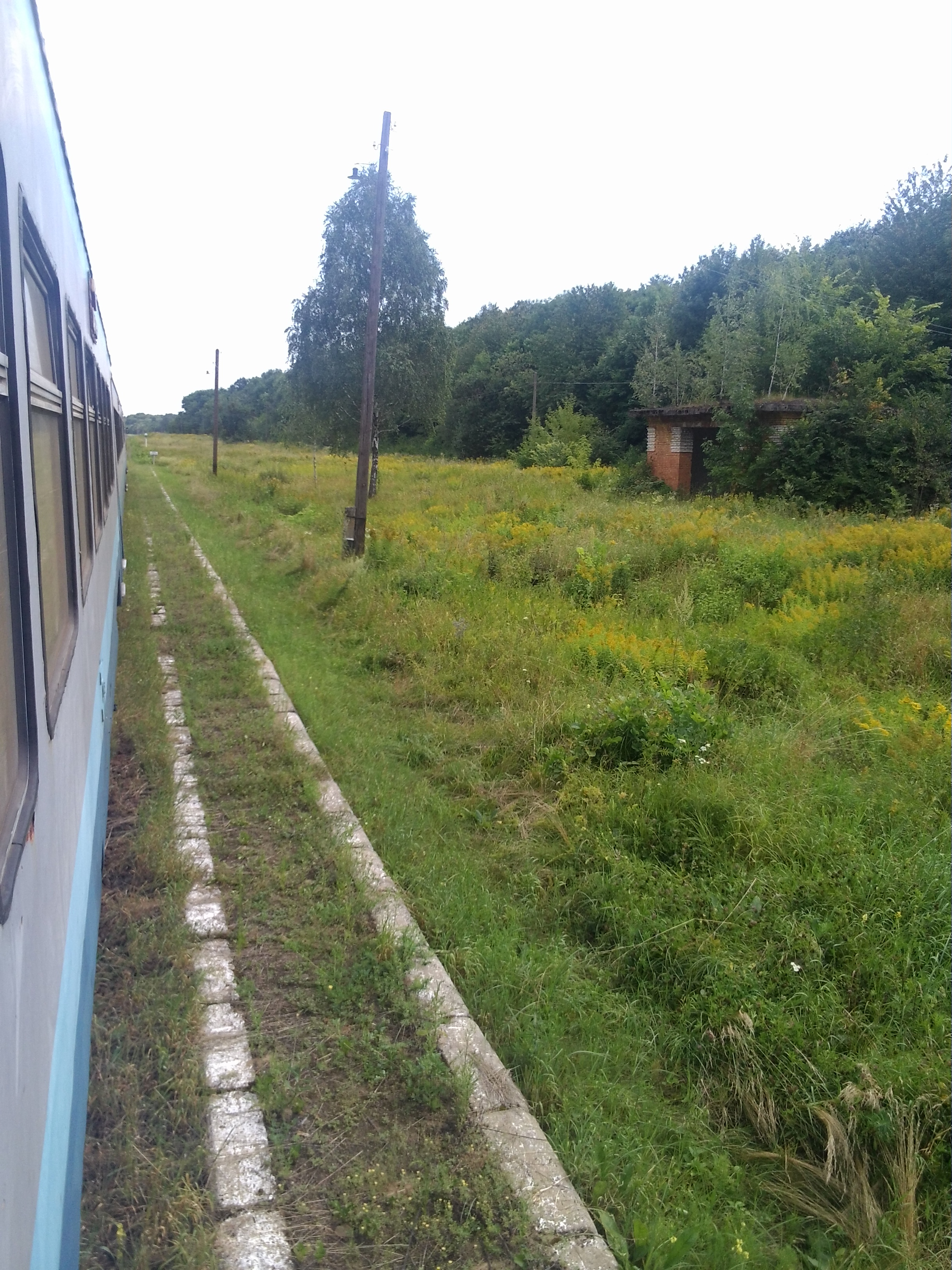
Plyskiv Railway stop
