= Kyiv pogrom (1945) =

Anti-Jewish pogrom in Kyiv in 1945

- Location: Kyiv, Ukrainian Soviet Socialist Republic, Soviet Union
- Date: 1945
- Target: Jewish civilians
- Attack type: Pogrom, anti-Jewish riot
- Deaths: 5 to 16
- Injuries: over 100
- Motive: Antisemitism

The Kyiv pogrom of 1945 was an anti-Jewish outbreak of violence that took place in Kyiv, Ukrainian Soviet Socialist Republic, in 1945. It occurred in the aftermath of the Second World War amid heightened antisemitic tensions in the Soviet Union. According to available sources, the violence resulted in 5 to 16 deaths and over 100 injured.

== Background ==
Antisemitism in Kyiv was deeply entrenched. The city experienced anti-Jewish pogroms in 1881 and 1905, as well as several more during the Russian Civil War (1918–1920). Between 1911 and 1913, Kyiv was also consumed by the Beilis affair, a notorious blood libel case. During the Soviet period, antisemitism was officially condemned; however, it persisted in everyday life. The greatest catastrophe for Kyiv's Jewish population was the German occupation, particularly the massacres at Babi Yar, which continued from September 1941 to November 1943, with the most intense phase occurring on 29–30 September 1941. In Babi Yar, 100,000–150,000 people were killed, primarily Jews. The massacres were carried out with the participation of the Ukrainian Auxiliary Police.

In November 1943, Kyiv was liberated. Residents began returning to the city, including Jewish inhabitants who had been evacuated eastward in 1941. The housing situation in the city was catastrophic. Around 6,000 residential buildings, approximately 40% of the city's housing stock, had been destroyed. By 1944, more than 200,000 Kyiv residents were homeless. Many returning Jews were unable to reclaim their pre-war apartments, which had been occupied by other people during the occupation period. Even the responses of the authorities were often ineffective. The housing crisis, leading to tensions between Jews and non-Jewish residents, further intensified the antisemitic atmosphere. Acts of violence against Jews occurred in Kyiv. The most significant wave took place on 22 July 1944, on the third anniversary of the German invasion of the USSR, when assaults and beatings of Jews in the streets of Kyiv were recorded.

== Events ==
The background of the September 1945 pogrom was a conflict between the Grabar family and the Rybchinsky family over an apartment. The Rybchinskys, who were of Jewish origin, were evacuated in 1941 to Uzbekistan; during the occupation their apartment was occupied by Ivan Grabar and his mother. Ivan Grabar was conscripted into the Red Army in November 1943. In February 1945, the Rybchinskys returned to Kyiv and, through legal proceedings, regained the right to the apartment. Grabar was granted leave from 16 August to 8 September and returned to Kyiv. However, he was unable to achieve anything in order to recover the apartment.

Grabar was left with a sense of grievance, which also strengthened antisemitic attitudes; at the prosecutor's office he was reported to have said: "We fight on the front and Yids occupy our apartments." On 4 September at 5:30 p.m., an intoxicated Grabar and his acquaintance Melnikov beat an NKGB radio technician, Iosif Rosenstein, in the street. After returning home, Rosenstein put on his uniform and, together with his wife, went to Grabar's house. During a subsequent altercation, he shot and killed Grabar and Melnikov. A crowd that gathered at the scene then beat Rosenstein, his wife, and a passing Jew, Boris (or Grigory) Spektor. The crows was shouting "Beat the Jews and save Russia!" The crowd also broke into Spektor's apartment, where they also beat his family. Police restored order. Rosenstein was arrested and soon executed by decision of a military tribunal.

According to witness testimonies, the conflict between Rosenstein, Grabar, and Melnikov had an additional, not strictly antisemitic, dimension. Rosenstein had lived in Odesa before the war, and after evacuation he served as an NKVD radio operator in Azerbaijan. Grabar and Melnikov were originally from Kyiv and had been Red Army soldiers until 1941 and again from November 1943 onward. They spent the occupation period in the city and, according to some witnesses, were associated with partisan activity in late 1943, although their exact activities during the occupation remain unclear. Some testimonies state that Rosenstein referred to them as "German traitors" (немецкие шкуры), while they called Rosenstein a "partisan from Tashkent." The conflict therefore also reflected broader tensions between those who had survived the occupation in the city and those who returned after its liberation.

The funeral of the victims took place on 7 September 1945 and turned into an anti-Jewish demonstration, and subsequently into a pogrom involving approximately 300 people. Five to sixteen Jews were killed and more than 100 were injured. The scale of the pogrom was nevertheless limited due to increased security in the city.

== Aftermath ==
The authorities attempted to restrict the influx of Jewish population into the city, considering it the simplest way to reduce anti-Jewish violence. Despite these efforts, the influx of Jewish population continued. By 1 January 1947, Jews constituted 18.8% of Kyiv's population: 132,467 out of 704,609 city inhabitants. A significant proportion of them had not lived in Kyiv before the war. The famine of 1946–1947 intensified antisemitic attitudes, as did the official anti-Jewish campaign conducted by the Soviet authorities in 1948–1953.

== See also ==
- Antisemitism in the Soviet Union
- Antisemitism in Ukraine
- History of the Jews in Ukraine
- History of the Jews in Kyiv

== Bibliography ==
- Kende, Tamás (2019). "Anti-Semitism and inner fronts in the USSR during World War II". European Review of History: Revue européenne d'histoire. 26 (6): 963–976. doi:10.1080/13507486.2019.1625308.
- Khiterer, Victoria (2023). "Unwelcome Return Home: Jews, Anti-Semitism and the Housing Problem in Post-War Kyiv". Eastern European Holocaust Studies. 1 (1): 155–174. doi:10.1515/eehs-2022-0001. ISSN 2749-9030.
- Salomoni, Antonella (2010). "State-Sponsored Anti-Semitism in Postwar USSR: Studies and Research Perspectives". Quest. Issues in Contemporary Jewish History (1). doi:10.48248/issn.2037-741X/728.
