= Gissin =

Gissin (Hebrew: גיסין), meaning "brother-in-law" is a Jewish surname that may refer to the following notable people:

- Avshalom Gissin (1896–1921), Jewish military officer
- Raanan Gissin (1949–2023), Israeli political scientist
