= Kiev pogroms (1919) =

Series of anti-Jewish attacks in Kiev, Ukraine in 1919

- Part of Pogroms during the Russian Civil War
- Pogrom victims in Alexander Hospital, Kiev, 1919. Credit: Elias Tcherikower
- Location: Kiev, Kiev Governorate, South Russia
- Date: 1919
- Target: Primarily Jews
- Attack type: Decapitation, Burning, Stabbing, Shooting
- Deaths: Unspecified number
- Injuries: Unspecified number
- Perpetrators: Various Ukrainian rebels, White Armies and Don Cossacks

The Kiev pogroms of 1919 refers to a series of anti-Jewish pogroms in various places in and around Kiev carried out by White Volunteer Army troops and some other anti-Bolshevik forces during the Russian Civil War.

== Background ==
The Kiev Pogroms of 1919 were splurges of looting, raping, and murder chiefly directed against the shops, factories, homes, and persons of the Jews. Ukraine had the largest concentration of Jews in Russia (part of the Russian organized Pale of Settlement) at the time and was also the scene of the bitterest and most prolonged fighting involving both Jews and non-Jews. This is important because according to research there is a positive correlation on a broad scale between the number of Jews, in a given place, and an increased likelihood of pogroms, and they become more likely when long-term subordination and superordination of social groups is in dispute.

There were a total of 1,326 pogroms across Ukraine around that time, in which between 30,000 and 70,000 Jews were massacred. The pogroms were marked by utmost cruelty and face-to-face brutality. Thousands of women were raped. Hundreds of shtetlekh were pillaged, and Jewish neighborhoods were left in ruins. According to some estimates, overall, in the pogroms of 1918–1921, half a million Jews were left homeless. Of these 53.7% were committed by Petlura's Ukrainian nationalists, the remainder by troops from White Volunteer Army (17%), the Bolsheviks' Red Army (2.3%), or local bands. These estimates include deaths due to massacre-induced disease or starvation. More recent estimates based on newly available Russian records judge the percentage killed by the White Volunteer Army to be much higher, perhaps as high as 50 percent."

Despite claims to the contrary, the Kiev Pogroms of 1919 were not the first of their kind in Ukraine, and other instances of violence occurred and were carried out against Jews in and around Kiev in the 1880s and the first decade of the 20th century. Ultimately the tension from these events never really subsided, it laid just beneath the surface and could be seen as a cause of further violence. However the Jewish massacres in Ukraine in the year 1919, which set the whole land ablaze, can not be compared with these previous pogroms due to its essence and scope. The Kiev Pogroms of 1919 were the bloodiest and the most atypical of the pogroms in Ukraine, taking place after the fall of the imperial regime and under conditions of bitter strife, where violence of every kind was basically unrestrained. Fueled by antisemitism and propaganda against the Jews, the massacre of the Jews in Kiev, in 1919, was essentially a method for political warfare.

== Causes ==
The tsarist regime had attempted to "divert the attention of the socially and politically discontented masses in another direction, the direction of least resistance." Essentially it was a way of redirecting popular discontent away from the government and onto a visible minority group. They did this by inciting the lower classes against the Jews who were largely defenseless, and who, they also proposed, were responsible for the misery of the people as a whole. The Jews were depicted as the exploiters of the people, as the leeches of society, who drained the blood of the worker and robbed him of the bounty of his economic activity.

Another cause of the Kiev Pogroms of 1919, was economic difficulties and changes in the urban environment. Economic difficulties and political strife tended to increase the probability of pogroms and this was certainly the case with Ukraine which was in a state of conflict and transition during the Ukrainian War of Independence and afterwards when it had separated from Russia. The stress of changes in the urban environment also provided fertile ground for violence against Jews, stresses such as immigration, not only by Jews from other parts of the empire but by outsiders in general made the pogroms possible.

== Pogroms ==
People in NYC protesting against the violent pogroms

Caption Reads: Thousands of Jews marched in the great New York Parade to a mass meeting of protest against recent pogroms in Ukraine, where, speakers said, 120,000 Jews have been massacred. In the parade a service flag was carried with 8,000 stars for Jews killed in service of the United States.

-December 2, 1919; Daily Ardmoreite (Oklahoma Paper)

The series of events concern the following districts:

- Skvyra, June 23, 1919: a pogrom in which 45 Jews were massacred, many were severely wounded, and 35 Jewish women were raped by armed insurgents.
- Justingrad, August, 1919: where a pogrom made its way through the shtetl with an unspecified number of Jewish men murdered and Jewish women raped.
- Tetiiv pogrom, August 1919.
- Fastov massacre, September 1919.
- Podil and other Jewish-populated districts of Kyiv, where a series of pogroms was perpetrated by White Army troops and ordinary criminals in October 1919 after accusations of Jewish collaboration with Bolsheviks.
- Ivankiv district, 18–20 October 1919. In the pogrom carried out by Cossack troops of the Volunteer Army, 14 Jews were massacred, 9 wounded, and 15 Jewish women and girls were raped by units under the command of Struk in three days of carnage.

== Immediate reactions ==
The leaders of the White Army issued orders condemning the pogroms, but these were largely unheeded due to widespread antisemitism. Lenin had spoken out against pogroms in March, and in June and the Bolsheviks assigned some funds for victims of pogroms. However, the events received little coverage in the Bolshevik press.

== See also ==
- Kiev pogrom (1905)
- Kishinev pogrom

== Further references ==
- Harold Henry Fisher: The Famine in Soviet Russia, 1919-1923: The Operations of the American Relief Administration
- William Henry Chamberlin, The Russian Revolution, 1917–1921. Published 1935 by Macmillan company pg. 230
- David J. Mitchell, 1919: Red Mirage. Published 1970, Cape, 249
- Zvi Y. Gitelman, A Century of Ambivalence: The Jews of Russia and the Soviet Union, 1881 to the Present. Pg. 67.
- I. Michael Aronson, Troubled Waters: The Origins of the 1881 Anti-Jewish Pogroms in Russia, University of Pittsburgh Press, 1990.
