= Avshalom Gissin =

Jewish Ottoman officer and Zionist pioneer

- אבשלום גיסין
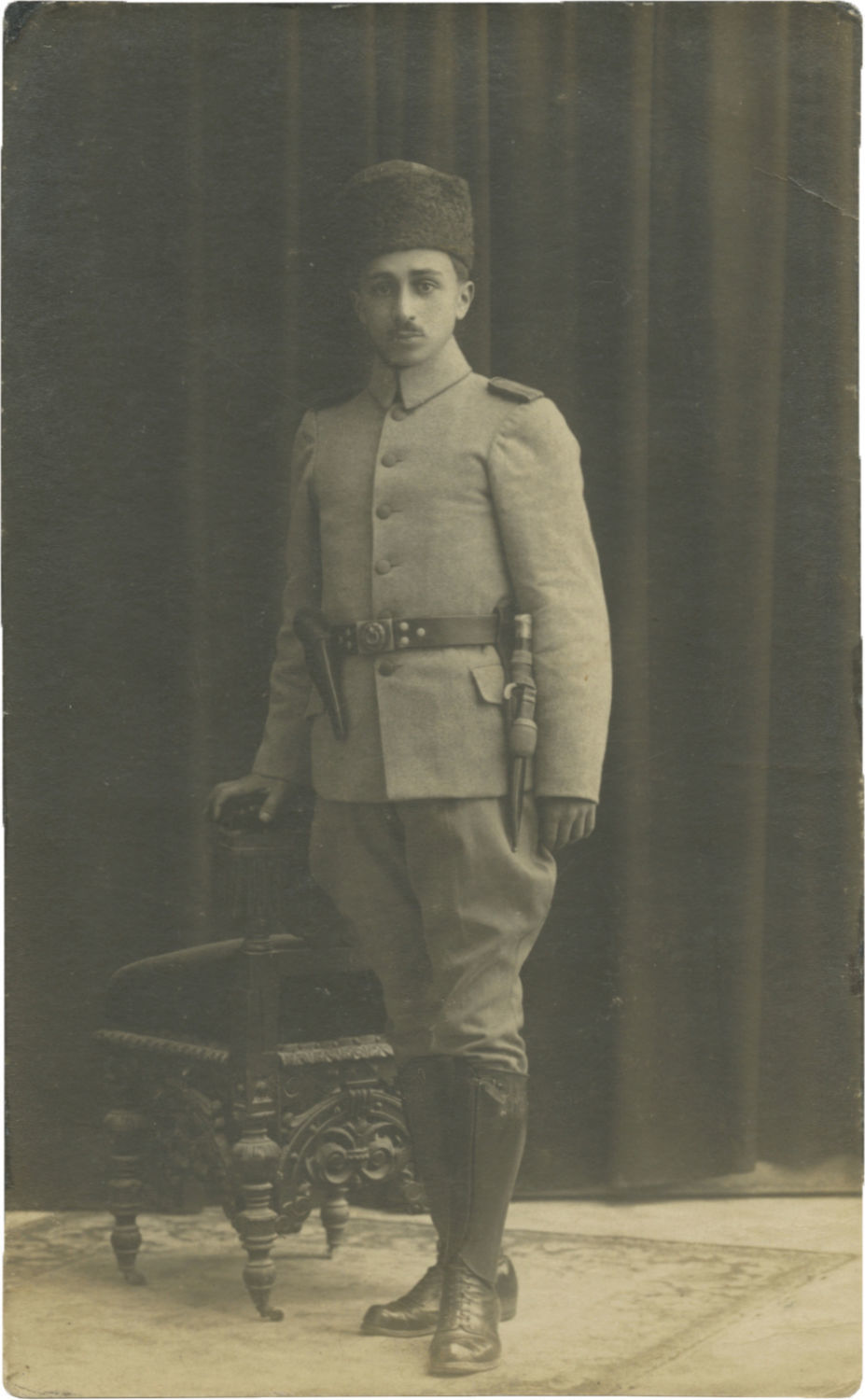
- Likely portrait of Avshalom Gissin as an Ottoman Army cadet in Istanbul in 1913, by Khalil Raad
- Born: 1896; Petah Tikva, Mutasarrifate of Jerusalem, Ottoman Empire
- Died: 5 May 1921 (aged 24–25); Petah Tikva, Mandatory Palestine
- Burial place: Petah Tikva Cemetery, Petah Tikva
- Military career
- Allegiance: Ottoman Empire
- Branch: Ottoman Army
- Service years: 1912-1918
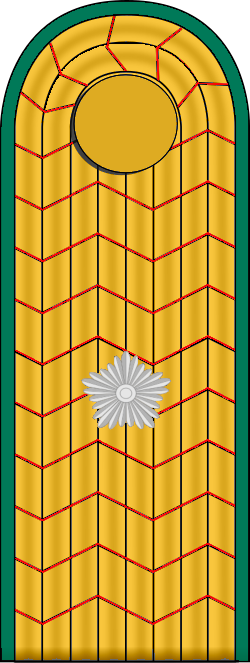
- Rank: First lieutenant
- Unit: Sports Instructor
- Conflicts: World War I
- Other work: Zionist pioneer, Local defense organizer in Petah Tikva

Avshalom Gissin (Hebrew: אבשלום גיסין; 1896 – 5 May 1921) was a Jewish officer in the Ottoman Army and a Zionist pioneer, who was killed during the 1921 Jaffa riots while defending Petah Tikva.

== Biography ==
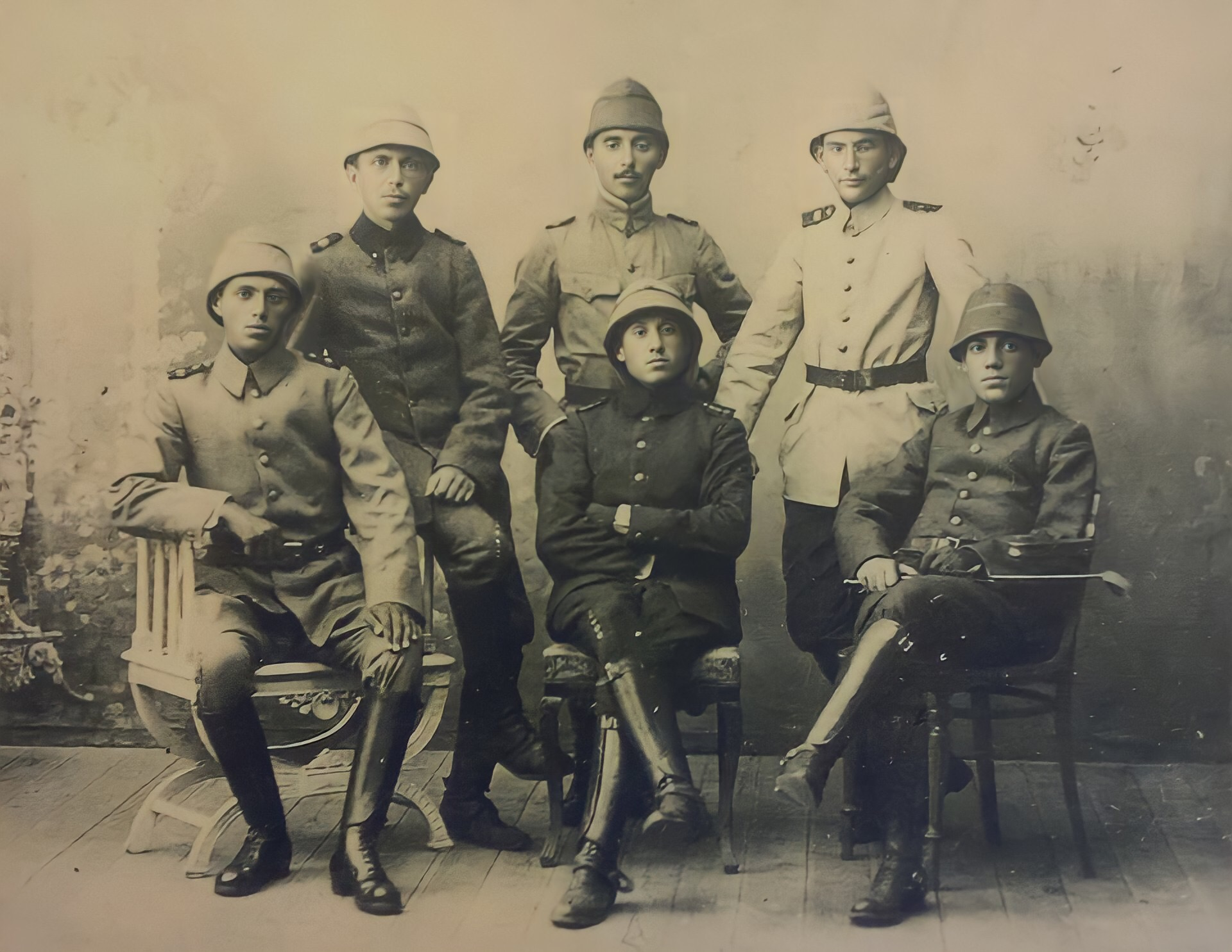
Jewish officers from Palestine serving in the Ottoman Army. Standing: Dov Hoz, Moshe Sharett, Shemuel Yeivin. Seated: David Beit Halachmi, Avshalom Gissin, and Moshe Gvirtzman (1916, Istanbul)

Gissin was born in Petah Tikva in 1896, one of five children born to Moshe Gissin, one of the early settlers in Petah Tikva. As a student in the local school, Gissin was active in movement which aimed to substitute the teaching language from French to Hebrew. After graduating from the local school, Gissin studied in the Herzliya Hebrew Gymnasium, and at the age of 16 moved to Istanbul, where he studied at Kuleli Military High School, later transferring to a military high school in Damascus to be closer to his family. Gissin joined the Ottoman Army upon graduation, and as an officer was stationed in a military school in Istanbul as a sports instructor. After the end of World War I, Gissin returned to Petah Tikva, where helped organize a local defense force and helped to re-establish the local Maccabi club. He also conducted surveying in southern Palestine.

At the start of the 1921 Palestine riots, Gissin returned to Petah Tikva, where he set up a line of defense against the local Arabs. On 5 May 1921 armed gunmen from the Abu Kishak tribe attacked Petah Tikva. During the attack Gissin was shot in his chest and head and died of his injuries. He was buried the following day, along three other fallen defenders in the local cemetery.

== Memorialization ==
In October 1922, after a period of inactivity, Maccabi Petah Tikva was re-established and was named after Gissin. A main street in Petah Tikva was named after Gissin.
