= Pogrom =

Violent attack on an ethnic or religious group

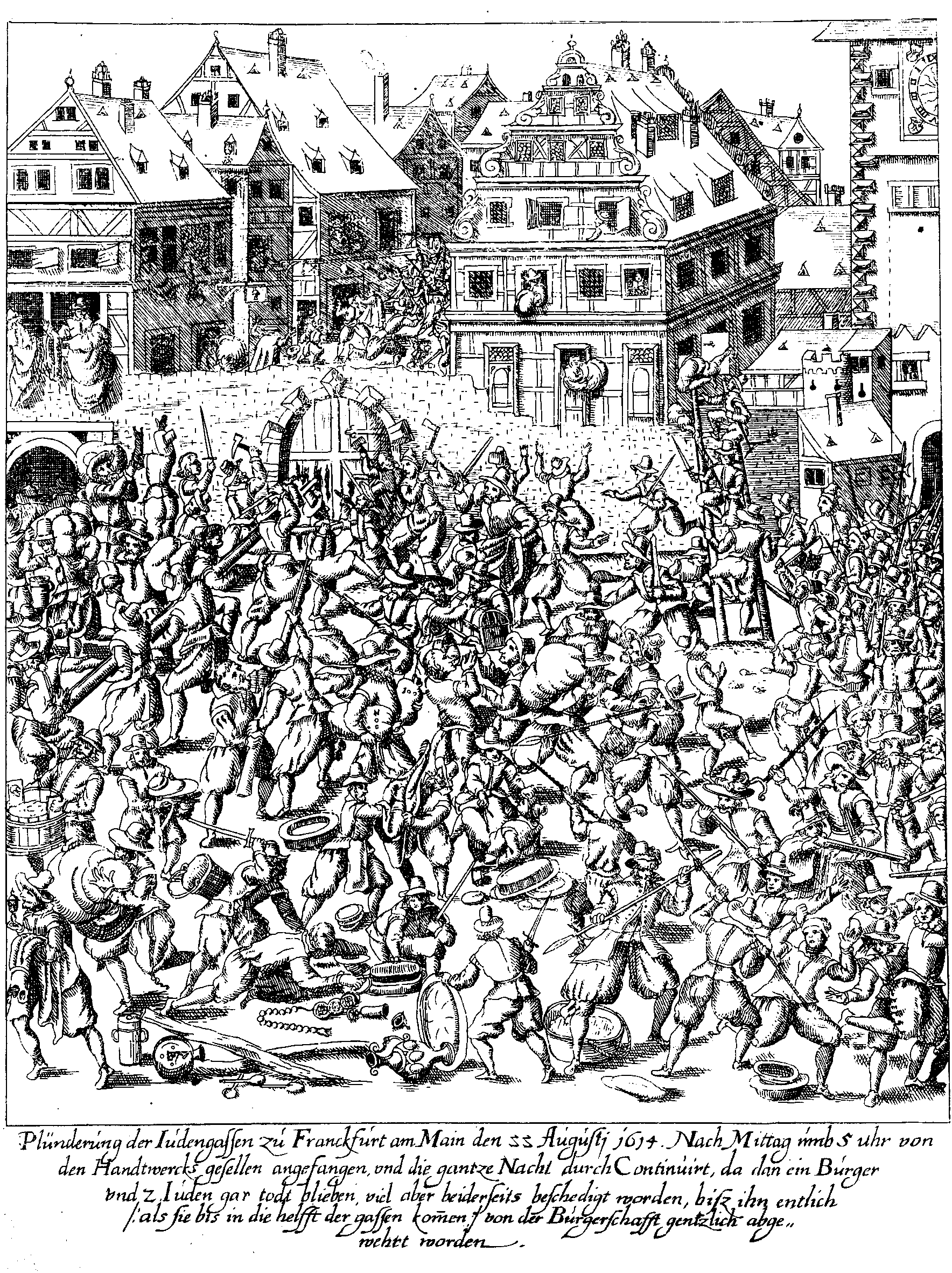
- Plundering the Judengasse in a Jewish ghetto during the Fettmilch uprising. Frankfurt, 22 August 1614
- Target: Predominantly Jews; Additionally other ethnic groups

A pogrom (Note: UK: /ˈpɒɡrəm/ POG-rəm, US: /ˈpoʊɡrəm, ˈpoʊɡrɒm, pəˈɡrɒm/ POH-grəm, POH-grom, pə-GROM; Russian: погро́м, pronounced [pɐˈɡrom].) is a violent riot incited with the aim of massacring or expelling an ethnic or religious group. Until the mid-20th century the term usually applied to attacks on Jews. The term entered the English language from Russian to describe late 19th- and early 20th-century attacks on Jews in the Russian Empire (mostly within the Pale of Settlement). Retrospectively, similar attacks against Jews which occurred in other times and places were renamed pogroms. Contemporarily, the word is also used to describe publicly sanctioned purgative attacks against non-Jewish groups. The characteristics of a pogrom vary widely, depending on the specific incident, at times leading to, or culminating in, massacres.

Significant pogroms which occurred in the Russian Empire included the Odessa pogroms, Warsaw pogrom (1881), Kishinev pogrom (1903), Kiev pogrom (1905), and Białystok pogrom (1906). After the collapse of the Russian Empire in 1917, several pogroms occurred amidst the power struggles in Eastern Europe, including the Lwów pogrom (1918) and Kiev pogroms (1919). The most significant pogrom which occurred in Nazi Germany was the 1938 Kristallnacht. At least 91 Jews were killed, a further 30,000 were arrested and subsequently incarcerated in concentration camps, 1,000 synagogues burned, and over 7,000 Jewish businesses destroyed or damaged. Notorious pogroms of World War II included the 1941 Farhud in Iraq, the July 1941 Iași pogrom in Romania – in which over 13,200 Jews were killed – as well as the Jedwabne pogrom in German-occupied Poland. Post-World War II pogroms included the 1945 Tripoli pogrom, the 1946 Kielce pogrom, the 1947 Aleppo pogrom, and the 1955 Istanbul pogrom.

Other ethnic and religious minorities have also been victims of this type of violence. Events include the 1984 Sikh massacre in which 3,000 Sikhs were killed and the 2002 Gujarat pogrom against Indian Muslims.

== The word pogrom ==
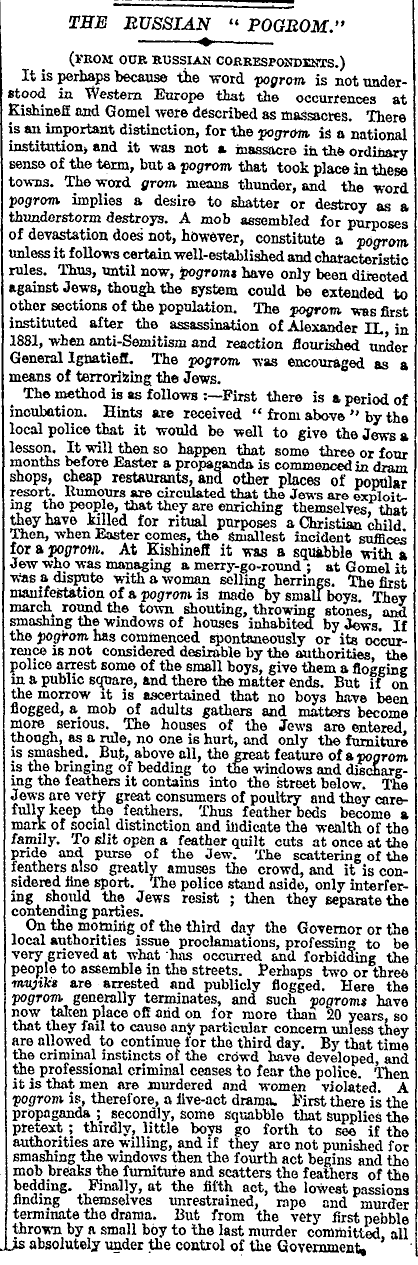
An early reference to a "pogrom" in The Times of London, December 1903. Together with The New York Times and the Hearst press, they took the lead in highlighting the pogrom in Kishinev (now Chişinău, Moldova) and other cities in Russia. In May of the same year, The Times' Russian correspondent Dudley Disraeli Braham had been expelled from Russia.

=== Etymology ===
First recorded in English in 1882, the Russian word pogróm (погро́м, pronounced [pɐˈɡrom]) is derived from the common prefix po- (по-) and the verb gromít' (громи́ть, [ɡrɐˈmʲitʲ]) meaning 'to destroy, wreak havoc, demolish violently'. The noun pogrom, which has a relatively short history, is used in English and many other languages as a loanword, possibly borrowed from Yiddish (where the word takes the form פאָגראָם). Its modern widespread circulation began with the antisemitic violence in the Russian Empire in 1881–1883.

=== Usage of the word ===
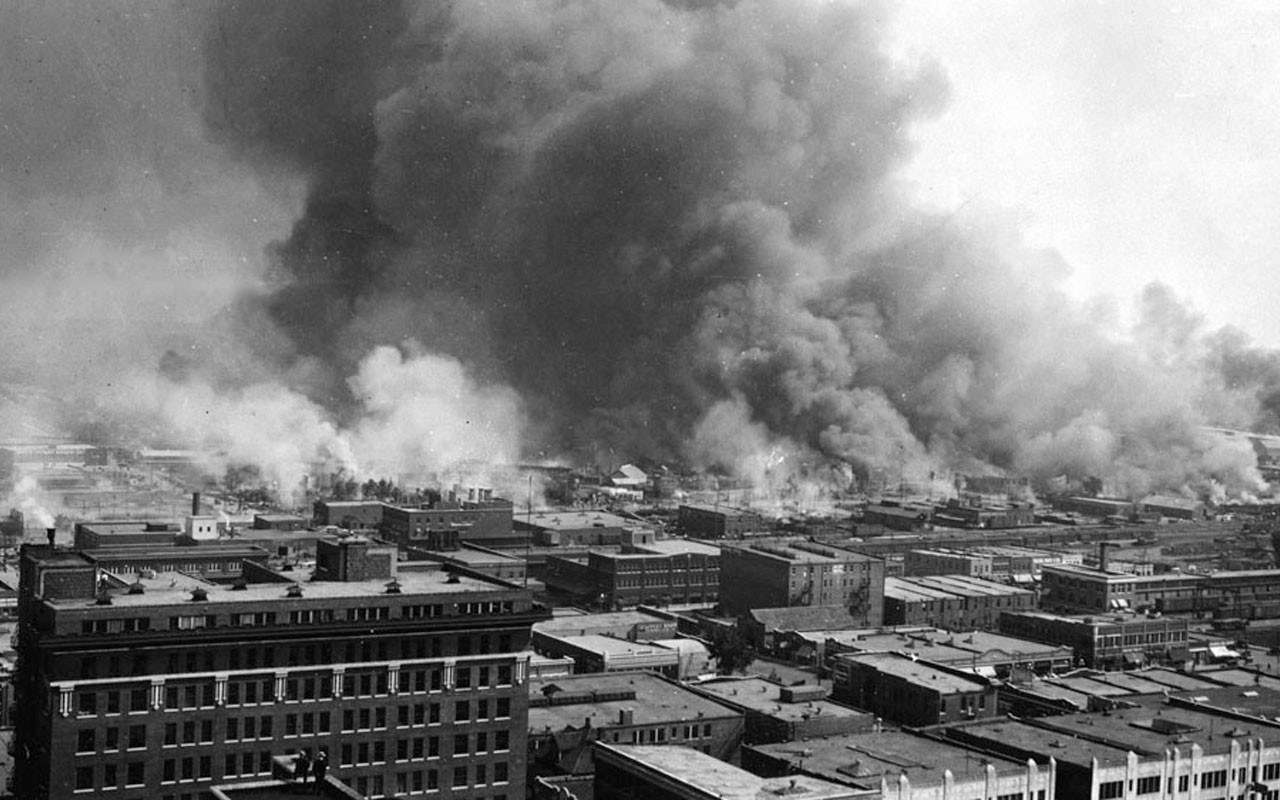
The 1921 Tulsa race massacre, which destroyed the wealthiest black community in the United States, has been described as a pogrom.

According to Encyclopædia Britannica, "the term is usually applied to attacks on Jews in the Russian Empire in the late 19th and early 20th centuries, [and] the first extensive pogroms followed the assassination of Tsar Alexander II in 1881". The Wiley-Blackwell Dictionary of Modern European History Since 1789 states that pogroms "were antisemitic disturbances that periodically occurred within the tsarist empire." However, the term is widely used to refer to many events which occurred prior to the Anti-Jewish pogroms in the Russian Empire. Historian of Russian Jewry John Klier writes in Russians, Jews, and the Pogroms of 1881–1882: "By the twentieth century, the word 'pogrom' had become a generic term in English for all forms of collective violence directed against Jews." Abramson points out that "in mainstream usage the word has come to imply an act of antisemitism", since while "Jews have not been the only group to suffer under this phenomenon ... historically Jews have been frequent victims of such violence."

The term is also used in reference to attacks on non-Jewish ethnic minorities, and accordingly, some scholars do not include antisemitism as the defining characteristic of pogroms. Reviewing the word's uses in scholarly literature, historian Werner Bergmann proposes that a pogrom should be "defined as a unilateral, nongovernmental form of collective violence that is initiated by the majority population against a largely defenseless minority ethnic group, and occurring when the majority expect the state to provide them with no assistance in overcoming a (perceived) threat from the minority". However, Bergmann adds that in Western usage, the word's "anti-Semitic overtones" have been retained. Historian David Engel supports this view, writing that while "there can be no logically or empirically compelling grounds for declaring that some particular episode does or does not merit the label [pogrom]," the majority of the incidents which are "habitually" described as pogroms took place in societies that were significantly divided by ethnicity or religion where the violence was committed by members of the higher-ranking group against members of a stereotyped lower-ranking group with which they expressed some complaint, and where the members of the higher-ranking group justified their acts of violence by claiming that the law of the land would not be used to prevent the alleged complaint.

There is no universally accepted set of characteristics which define the term pogrom. Klier writes that "when applied indiscriminately to events in Eastern Europe, the term can be misleading, the more so when it implies that 'pogroms' were regular events in the region and that they always shared common features." Use of the term pogrom to refer to events in 1918–19 in Polish cities (including the Kielce pogrom, the Pinsk massacre and the Lwów pogrom) was specifically avoided in the 1919 Morgenthau Report; the word "excesses" was employed instead because the authors argued that the use of the term "pogrom" required a situation to be antisemitic rather than political in nature, which meant that it was inapplicable to the conditions which exist in a war zone. Media use of the term pogrom to refer to the 1991 Crown Heights riot caused public controversy. In 2008, two separate attacks in the West Bank by Israeli Jewish settlers on Palestinian Arabs were characterized as pogroms by then Prime Minister of Israel Ehud Olmert.

Werner Bergmann suggests that all such incidents have a particularly unifying characteristic: "By the collective attribution of a threat, the pogrom differs from other forms of violence, such as lynchings, which are directed at individual members of a minority group, while the imbalance of power in favor of the rioters distinguishes pogroms from other forms of riots (food riots, race riots or 'communal riots' between evenly matched groups); and again, the low level of organization separates them from vigilantism, terrorism, massacre and genocide".

In Palestine in 1944, towards the end of British rule, the British censor forbade Hebrew-language newspapers from using the term "pogrom".

== History of anti-Jewish pogroms ==
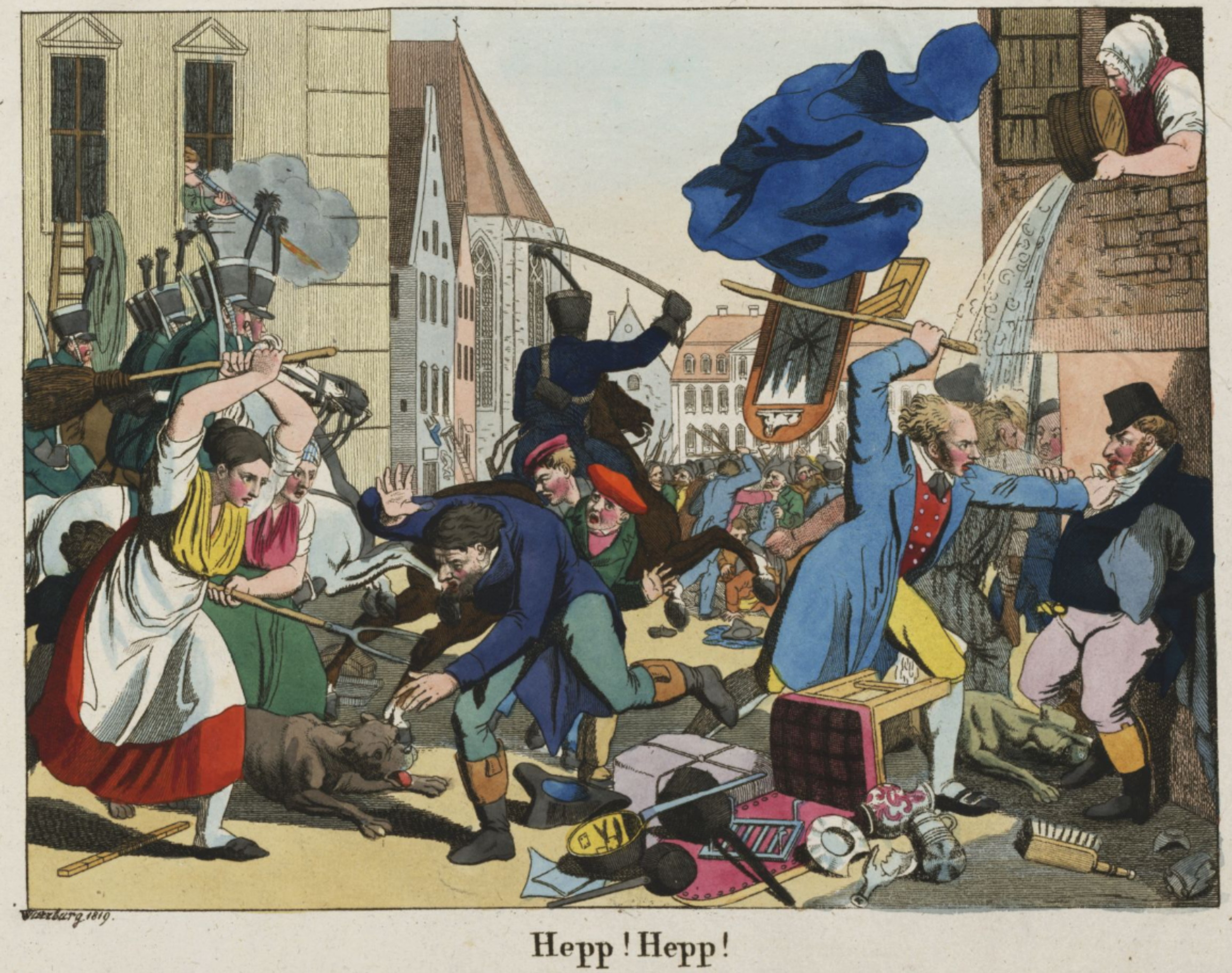
The Hep-Hep riots in Würzburg, 1819. On the left, two peasant women are assaulting a Jewish man with a pitchfork and a broom. On the right, a man wearing spectacles, tails and a six-button waistcoat, "perhaps a pharmacist or a schoolteacher," holds a Jewish man by the throat and is about to club him with a truncheon. The houses are being looted. A contemporary engraving by Johann Michael Voltz.

The first recorded anti-Jewish riots took place in Alexandria in the year 38 CE, followed by the more known riot of 66 CE. Other notable events took place in Europe during the Middle Ages. Jewish communities were targeted in 1189 and 1190 in England and throughout Europe during the Crusades and the Black Death of 1348–1350, including in Toulon, Erfurt, Basel, Aragon, Flanders and Strasbourg. Some 510 Jewish communities were destroyed during this period, extending further to the Brussels massacre of 1370. On Holy Saturday of 1389, a riot began in Prague that led to the burning of the Jewish quarter, the killing of many Jews, and the suicide of many Jews trapped in the main synagogue; the number of dead was estimated at 400–500 men, women and children. Attacks against Jews also took place in Barcelona and other Spanish cities during the massacre of 1391.

The brutal murders of Jews and Poles occurred during the Khmelnytsky Uprising of 1648–1657 in present-day Ukraine, then within the Polish–Lithuanian Commonwealth. Modern historians give estimates of the scale of the murders by Khmelnytsky's Cossacks ranging between 40,000 and 100,000 men, women and children, (Note: Historians, who put the number of killed Jewish civilians at between 40,000 and 100,000 during the Khmelnytsky Pogroms in 1648–1657, include: Naomi E. Pasachoff, Robert J. Littman (2005). A Concise History Of The Jewish People, Rowman & Littlefield, ISBN 0-7425-4366-8, p. 182.; David Theo Goldberg, John Solomos (2002). A Companion to Racial and Ethnic Studies, Blackwell, ISBN 0-631-20616-7, p. 68.; Micheal Clodfelter (2002). Warfare and Armed Conflicts: A Statistical Reference to Casualty and Other Figures, 1500–1999, McFarland, p. 56: estimated at 56,000 dead.) (Note: Historians estimating that around 100,000 Jews were killed include: Cara Camcastle. The More Moderate Side of Joseph de Maistre: Views on Political Liberty And Political Economy, McGill-Queen's Press, 2005, ISBN 0-7735-2976-4, p. 26.; Martin Gilbert (1999). Holocaust Journey: Traveling in Search of the Past, Columbia University Press, ISBN 0-231-10965-2, p. 219.; Manus I. Midlarsky. The Killing Trap: Genocide in the Twentieth Century, Cambridge University Press, 2005, ISBN 0-521-81545-2, p. 352.; Oscar Reiss (2004). The Jews in Colonial America, McFarland, ISBN 0-7864-1730-7, pp. 98–99.; Colin Martin Tatz (2003). With Intent to Destroy: Reflections on Genocide, Verso, ISBN 1-85984-550-9, p. 146.; Samuel Totten (2004). Teaching about Genocide: Issues, Approaches and Resources, Information Age Publishing, ISBN 1-59311-074-X, p. 25.; Mosheh Weiss (2004). A Brief History of the Jewish People, Rowman & Littlefield, ISBN 0-7425-4402-8, p. 193.) or perhaps many more. (Note: Historians who estimate that more than 100,000 Jews were killed in Ukraine in 1648–1657 include: Meyer Waxman (2003). History of Jewish Literature Part 3, Kessinger, ISBN 0-7661-4370-8, p. 20: estimated at two hundred thousand Jews killed.; Micheal Clodfelter (2002). Warfare and Armed Conflicts: A Statistical Reference to Casualty and Other Figures, 1500–1999, McFarland, p. 56: estimated at between 150,000 and 200,000 Jewish victims.; Zev Garber, Bruce Zuckerman (2004). Double Takes: Thinking and Rethinking Issues of Modern Judaism in Ancient Contexts, University Press of America, ISBN 0-7618-2894-X, p. 77, footnote 17: estimated at 100,000–500,000 Jews.; The Columbia Encyclopedia (2001–2005), "Chmielnicki Bohdan", 6th ed.: estimated at over 100,000 Jews.; Robert Melvin Spector (2005). World without Civilization: Mass Murder and the Holocaust, History and Analysis, University Press of America, ISBN 0-7618-2963-6, p. 77: estimated at more than 100,000.; Sol Scharfstein (2004). Jewish History and You, KTAV, ISBN 0-88125-806-7, p. 42: estimated at more than 100,000 Jews killed.) However, these figures are contested as being too high, with the lowest estimates suggesting that 18,000–20,000 Jews died out of a total population of 40,000, many due to disease and famine.

An outbreak of violence against Jews (Hep-Hep riots) occurred at the beginning of the 19th century in reaction to Jewish emancipation in the German Confederation.

=== Pogroms in the Russian Empire ===
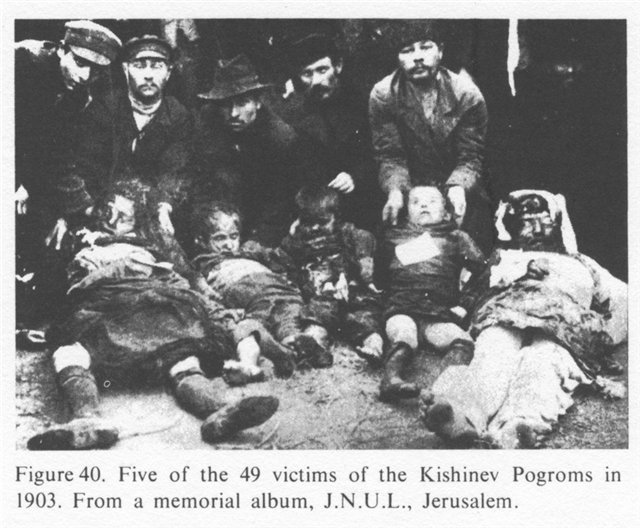
Victims of a pogrom in Kishinev, Bessarabia, 1903

The Russian Empire, which previously had very few Jews, acquired territories in the Russian Partition that contained large Jewish populations, during the military partitions of Poland in 1772, 1793 and 1795. In conquered territories, a new political entity called the Pale of Settlement was formed in 1791 by Catherine the Great. Most Jews from the former Commonwealth were allowed to reside only within the Pale, including families expelled by royal decree from St. Petersburg, Moscow and other large Russian cities. The Pale of Settlement remained in effect until 1915. The 1821 Odessa pogroms marked the beginning of the 19th century pogroms in Tsarist Russia; there were four more such pogroms in Odessa before the end of the century. Following the assassination of Alexander II in 1881 by Narodnaya Volya, anti-Jewish events turned into a wave of over 200 pogroms by their modern definition, which lasted for several years. Jewish self-governing Kehillah were abolished by Tsar Nicholas I in 1844.

There is some disagreement about the level of planning from the Tsarist authorities and the motives for the attacks.

The first in 20th-century Russia was the Kishinev pogrom of 1903 in which 49 Jews were killed, hundreds wounded, 700 homes destroyed and 600 businesses pillaged. The Kishinev pogrom occurred after a newspaper promoted a blood libel (a false claim that Jews had murdered a boy to use his blood in a ritual). Local authorities supported the perpetrators of the pogrom, and Tsar Nicholas II excused the murders they committed.

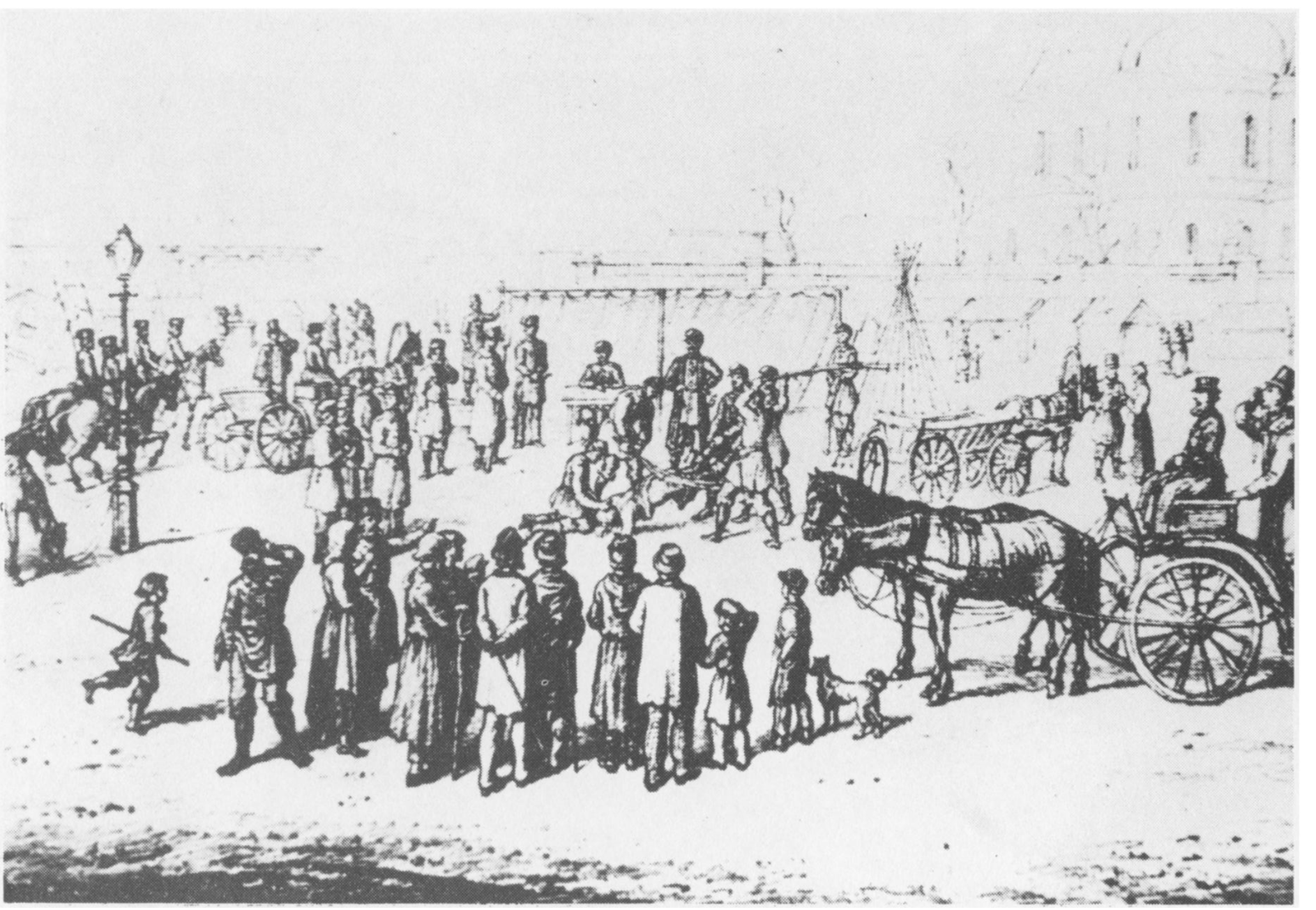
Vakhrenkov Odessa pogrom 1871

Also in 1903, pogroms took place in Gomel (Belarus), Smela, Feodosiya and Melitopol (Ukraine). Extreme savagery was typified by mutilations of the wounded. They were followed by the Zhitomir pogrom (with 29 killed), and the Kiev pogrom of October 1905 resulting in a massacre of approximately 100 Jews. In three years between 1903 and 1906, about 660 pogroms were recorded in Ukraine and Bessarabia; half a dozen more in Belorussia, carried out with the Russian government's complicity, but no anti-Jewish pogroms were recorded in Poland. At about that time, the Jewish Labor Bund began organizing armed self-defense units ready to shoot back, and the pogroms subsided for a number of years. According to professor Colin Tatz, between 1881 and 1920 there were 1,326 pogroms in Ukraine (see: Southwestern Krai parts of the Pale) which took the lives of 70,000 to 250,000 civilian Jews, leaving half a million homeless. This violence across Eastern Europe prompted a wave of Jewish migration westward that totaled about 2.5 million people.

=== Eastern Europe after World War I ===
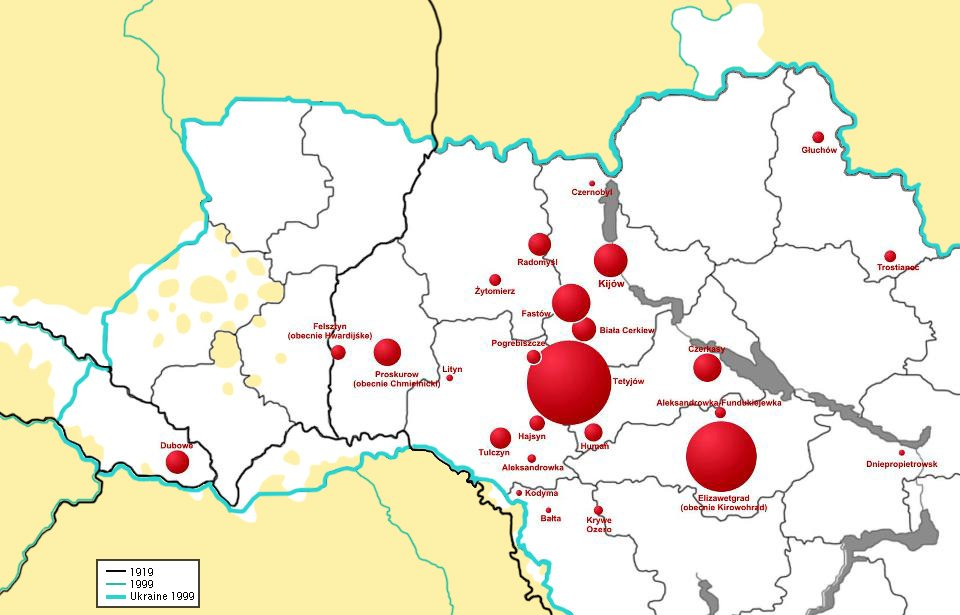
Map of pogroms in Ukraine between 1918 and 1920 per casualties

Large-scale pogroms, which began in the Russian Empire several decades earlier, intensified during the period of the Russian Civil War in the aftermath of World War I. Professor Zvi Gitelman (in A Century of Ambivalence, originally published in 1988) estimated that only in 1918–1919 over 1,200 pogroms took place in Ukraine, thus amounting to the greatest slaughter of Jews in Eastern Europe since 1648. The Kiev pogroms of 1919, according to Gitelman, were the first of a subsequent wave of pogroms in which between 30,000 and 70,000 Jews were massacred across Ukraine; although more recent assessments put the Jewish death toll at more than 100,000.

Aleksandr Solzhenitsyn in his controversial 2002 book Two Hundred Years Together provided additional statistics from research conducted by Nahum Gergel (1887–1931), published in Yiddish in 1928 and English in 1951. Gergel counted 1,236 incidents of anti-Jewish violence between 1918 and 1921, and estimated that 887 mass pogroms occurred, the remainder being classified as "excesses" not assuming mass proportions. Of all the pogroms accounted for in Gergel's research:

- About 40 percent were perpetrated by the Ukrainian People's Republic forces led by Symon Petliura. The Republic issued orders condemning pogroms, but lacked authority to intervene. After May 1919 the Directory lost its role as a credible governing body; almost 75 percent of pogroms occurred between May and September of that year. Thousands of Jews were killed only for being Jewish, without any political affiliations.
- 25 percent by the Ukrainian Green Army and various Ukrainian nationalist gangs,
- 17 percent by the White Army, especially the forces of Anton Denikin,
- 8.5 percent of Gergel's total was attributed to pogroms carried out by men of the Red Army (more specifically Semyon Budenny's First Cavalry, most of whose soldiers had previously served under Denikin). These pogroms were not, however, sanctioned by the Bolshevik leadership; the high command "vigorously condemned these pogroms and disarmed the guilty regiments", and the pogroms would soon be condemned by Mikhail Kalinin in a speech made at a military parade in Ukraine.

Gergel's overall figures, which are generally considered conservative, are based on the testimony of witnesses and newspaper reports collected by the Mizrakh-Yidish Historiche Arkhiv which was first based in Kiev, then Berlin and later New York. The English version of Gergel's article was published in 1951 in the YIVO Annual of Jewish Social Science titled "The Pogroms in the Ukraine in 1918–1921".

On 8 August 1919, during the Polish–Soviet War, Polish troops took over Minsk in Operation Minsk. They killed 31 Jews suspected of supporting the Bolshevist movement, beat and attacked many more, looted 377 Jewish-owned shops (aided by the local civilians) and ransacked many private homes. Morgenthau's report of October 1919 stated "there is no question that some of the Jewish leaders exaggerated these evils." According to Elissa Bemporad, the "violence endured by the Jewish population under the Poles encouraged popular support for the Red Army, as Jewish public opinion welcomed the establishment of the Belorussian SSR."

After the First World War, during the localized armed conflicts of independence, 72 Jews were killed and 443 injured in the 1918 Lwów pogrom. The following year, pogroms were reported by the New York Tribune in several cities in the newly established Second Polish Republic.

=== Pogroms in Europe and the Americas before World War II ===
==== Argentina in 1919 ====
In 1919, a pogrom occurred in Argentina, during the Tragic Week. It had an added element, as it was called to attack Jews and Catalans indiscriminately. The reasons are not clear, especially considering that, in the case of Buenos Aires, the Catalan colony, established mainly in the neighborhood of Montserrat, came from the foundation of the city, but could have been the result of the influence of Spanish nationalism, which at the time described Catalans as a Semitic ethnicity.

==== Britain and Ireland ====
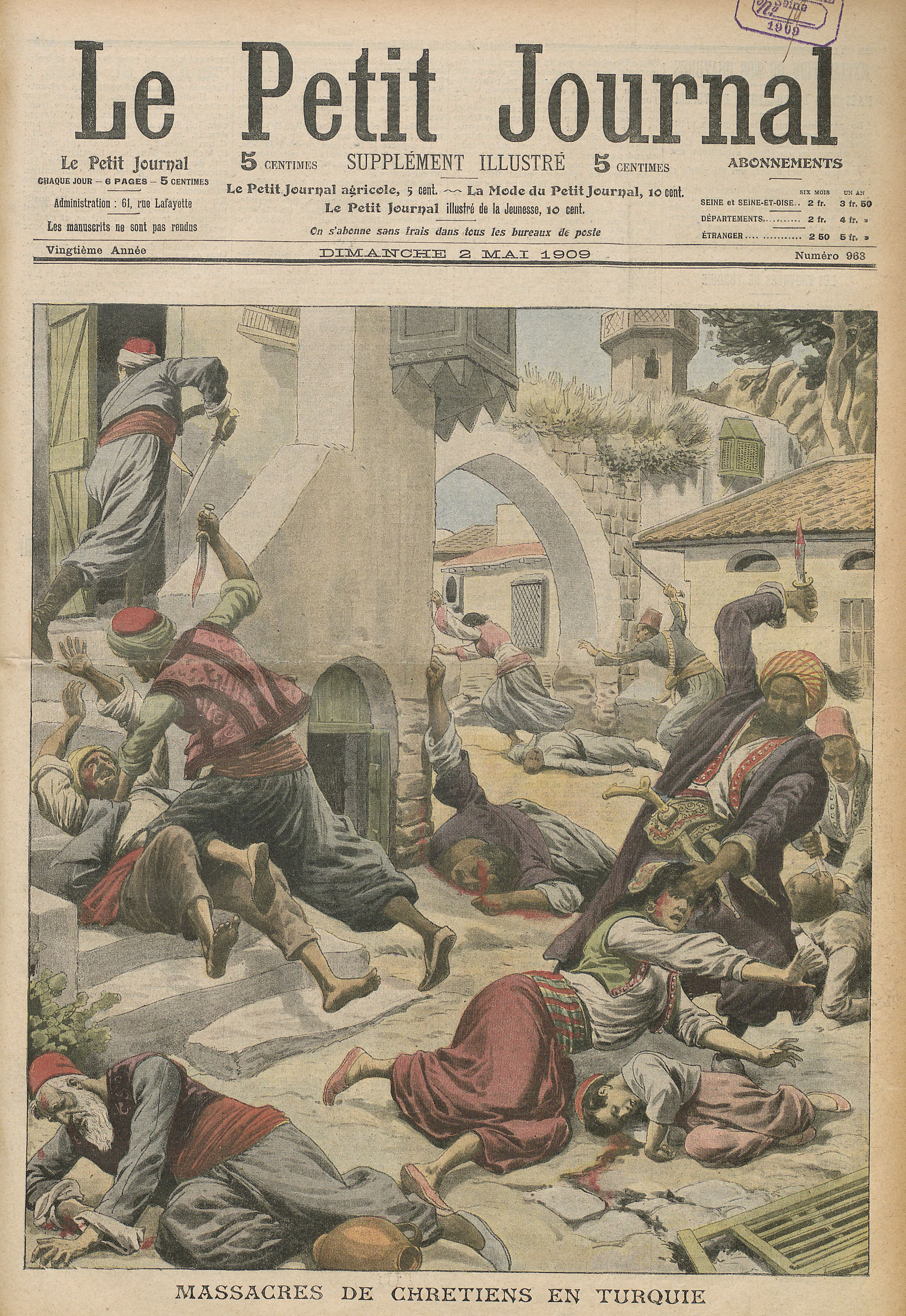
A massacre of Armenians and Assyrians in the city of Adana, Ottoman Empire, April 1909

In the early 20th century, pogroms broke out elsewhere in the world as well. In 1904 in Ireland, the Limerick boycott caused several Jewish families to leave the town. During the 1911 Tredegar riot in Wales, Jewish homes and businesses were looted and burned over a period of a week, before the British Army was called in by the then Home Secretary Winston Churchill, who described the riot as a "pogrom".

In the north of Ireland during the early 1920s, violent riots which were aimed at the expulsion of a religious group took place. In 1920, Lisburn and Belfast saw violence related to the Irish War of Independence and partition of Ireland. On 21 July 1920 in Belfast, Protestant Loyalists marched on the Harland and Wolff shipyards and forced over 11,000 Catholic and left-wing Protestant workers from their jobs. The sectarian rioting that followed resulted in about 20 deaths in just three days. These sectarian actions are often referred to as the Belfast Pogrom. In Lisburn, County Antrim, on 23–25 August 1920 Protestant loyalist crowds looted and burned practically every Catholic business in the town and attacked Catholic homes. About 1,000 people, a third of the town's Catholics, fled Lisburn. By the end of the first six months of 1922, hundreds of people had been killed in sectarian violence in newly formed Northern Ireland. On a per capita basis, four Roman Catholics were killed for every Protestant.

In the worst incident of anti-Jewish violence in Britain during the interwar period, the "Pogrom of Mile End", that occurred in 1936, 200 Blackshirt youths ran amok in Stepney in the East End of London, smashing the windows of Jewish shops and homes and throwing an elderly man and young girl through a window. Though less serious, attacks on Jews were also reported in Manchester and Leeds in the north of England.

=== Germany and Nazi-occupied Europe ===
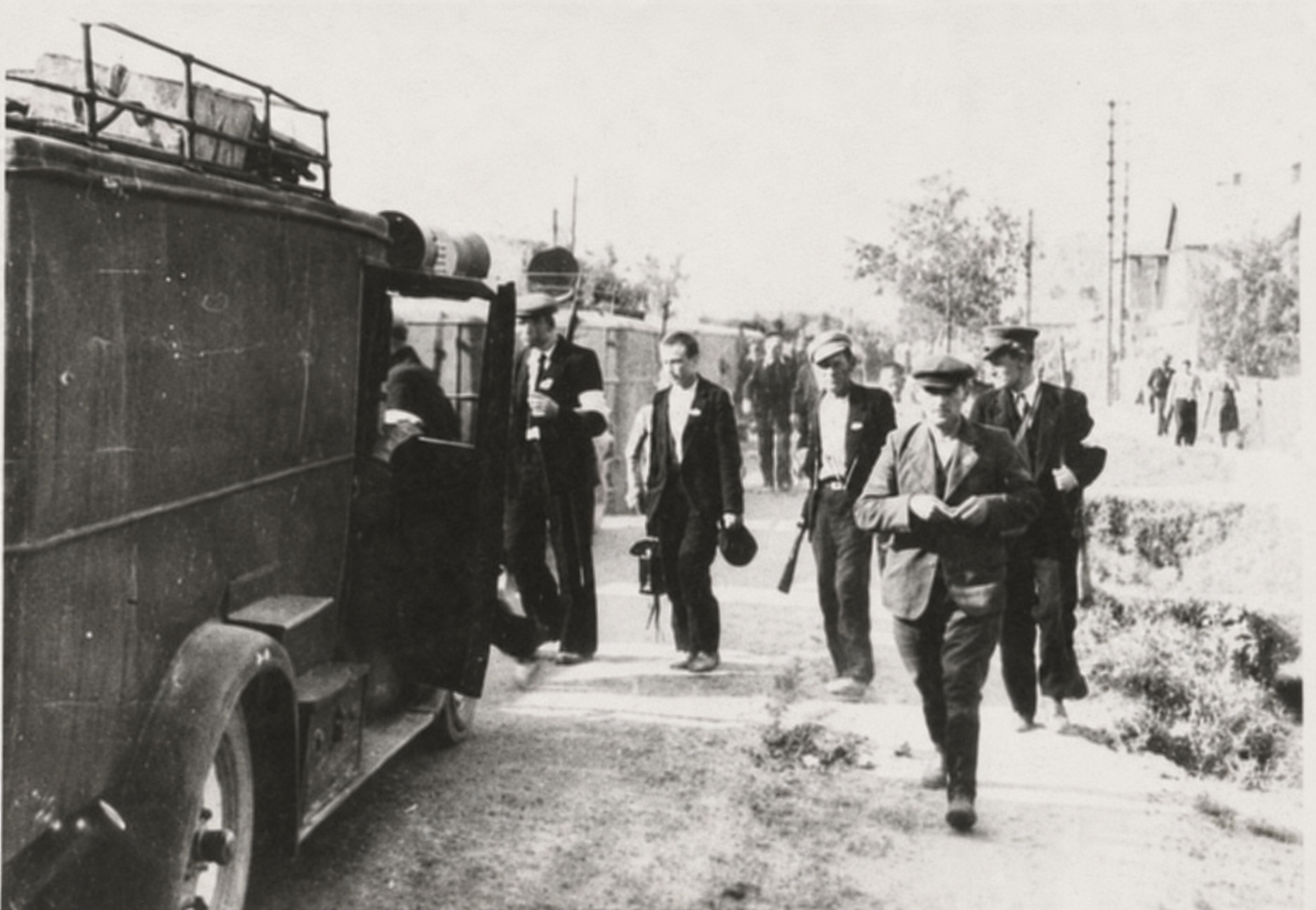
Public murder of Jews by Lithuanians after the invasion of the German Wehrmacht (pogrom), June 1941, Kaunas, Lithuania

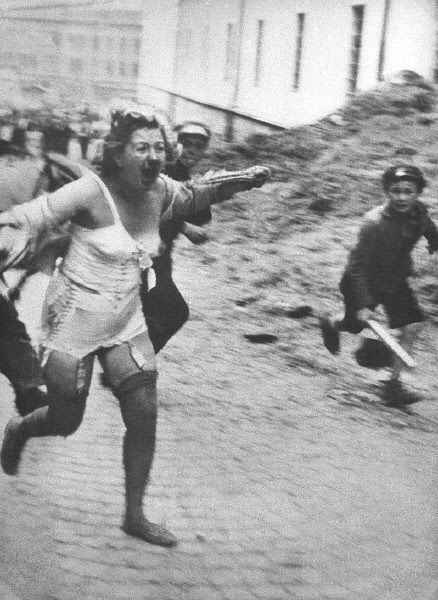
Jewish woman chased by men and youth armed with clubs during the Lviv pogroms, July 1941

The first pogrom in Nazi Germany was the Kristallnacht, often called Pogromnacht, in which at least 91 Jews were killed, a further 30,000 arrested and incarcerated in Nazi concentration camps, over 1,000 synagogues burned, and over 7,000 Jewish businesses destroyed or damaged.

During World War II, Nazi German death squads encouraged local populations in German-occupied Europe to commit pogroms against Jews. Brand new battalions of Volksdeutscher Selbstschutz (trained by SD agents) were mobilized from among the German minorities.

A large number of pogroms occurred during the Holocaust at the hands of non-Germans. Perhaps the deadliest of these Holocaust-era pogroms was the Iași pogrom in Romania, perpetrated by Ion Antonescu, in which as many as 13,266 Jews were killed by Romanian citizens, police and military officials.

On 1–2 June 1941, in the two-day Farhud pogrom in Iraq, perpetrated by Rashid Ali, Yunis al-Sabawi, and the al-Futuwa youth, "rioters murdered between 150 and 180 Jews, injured 600 others, and raped an undetermined number of women. They also looted some 1,500 stores and homes". Also, 300–400 non-Jewish rioters were killed in the attempt to quell the violence.

In June–July 1941, encouraged by the Einsatzgruppen in the city of Lviv the Ukrainian People's Militia perpetrated two citywide pogroms in which around 6,000 Polish Jews were murdered, in retribution for alleged collaboration with the Soviet NKVD. In Lithuania, some local police led by Algirdas Klimaitis and Lithuanian partisans – consisting of LAF units reinforced by 3,600 deserters from the 29th Lithuanian Territorial Corps of the Red Army promulgated anti-Jewish pogroms in Kaunas along with occupying Nazis. On 25–26 June 1941, about 3,800 Jews were killed and synagogues and Jewish settlements burned.

During the Jedwabne pogrom of July 1941, ethnic Poles burned at least 340 Jews in a barn (Institute of National Remembrance) in the presence of Nazi German Ordnungspolizei. The role of the German Einsatzgruppe B remains the subject of debate.

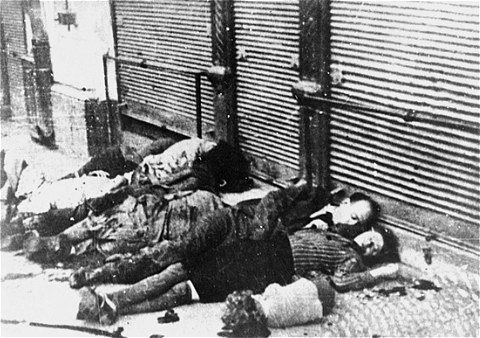
Iași pogrom in Romania, June 1941

=== Europe between World War II and 1948 ===
After the end of World War II, a series of violent antisemitic incidents occurred against returning Jews throughout Europe, particularly in the Soviet-occupied East where Nazi propagandists had extensively promoted the notion of a Jewish-Communist conspiracy (see Anti-Jewish violence in Poland, 1944–1946 and Anti-Jewish violence in Eastern Europe, 1944–1946). Anti-Jewish riots also took place in Britain in 1947.

== Asia and North Africa before 1948 ==
=== 1834 pogroms in Ottoman Syria ===
There were two pogroms in Ottoman Syria in 1834.

=== 1910 Shiraz pogrom ===
The 1910 Shiraz pogrom was a violent anti-Jewish riot that took place in the Jewish quarter of Shiraz, Iran, on October 30, 1910. Sparked by false accusations of ritual murder, the event resulted in the deaths of 12 Jews and left the city's Jewish community entirely destitute.

=== 1921 Urga pogrom ===
The 1921 Urga pogrom occurred during the final stages of the Russian Civil War, while Urga (present-day Ulaanbaatar, Mongolia) was occupied by forces loyal to Russian White Army warlord Baron Roman von Ungern-Sternberg.

=== 1929 in Mandatory Palestine ===
In Mandatory Palestine under British administration, Jews were targeted by Arabs in the 1929 Hebron massacre during the 1929 Palestine riots. They followed other violent incidents such as the 1920 Nebi Musa riots and 1921 Jaffa riots.

=== Thrace pogroms in Turkey in 1934 ===
The 1934 Thrace pogroms (Turkish: Trakya Olayları, "Thrace incidents" or "Thrace events", Ladino: Furtuna/La Furtuna, "Storm") were a series of violent attacks against Jewish citizens of Turkey in June and July 1934 in the Thrace region of Turkey. One of the main crucial factors behind the events was the Resettlement Law passed by the Turkish Assembly on 14 June 1934.

=== Constantine Pogrom in French Algeria in 1934 ===
The 1934 Constantine riots were an incident of antisemitic violence in the Algerian city of Constantine, targeting the local Jewish population. A mob of around 300 local Algerians attacked the Jewish quarter and targeted Jewish businesses and homes over a period of several hours, with the violence spreading to nearby towns. The French colonial authorities did little to rein in the violence.

It is uncertain what the exact cause of the riots was, but various accounts suggest that the riots were triggered by an altercation between a Jewish man and some Muslims at the Sidi Lakhdar Mosque in Constantine. Multiple sources report that 25 Jews and 3 Muslims died over the course of the three-day riot, and several Jewish establishments were pillaged. The events have been described as a pogrom.

=== British censorship in 1940s Palestine ===
In Palestine in 1944, towards the end of British rule, the British censor forbade Hebrew-language newspapers from using the term "pogrom".

=== British North Africa in 1945 ===
Anti-Jewish rioters killed over 140 Jews in the 1945 Anti-Jewish Riots in Tripolitania. The 1945 Anti-Jewish riots in Tripolitania was the most violent rioting against Jews in North Africa in modern times. From 5 November to 7 November 1945, more than 140 Jews were killed and many more injured in a pogrom in British-military-controlled Tripolitania. 38 Jews were killed in Tripoli from where the riots spread. 40 were killed in Amrus, 34 in Zanzur, 7 in Tajura, 13 in Zawia and 3 in Qusabat.

=== In Syria in 1947 and Morocco 1948 ===
Following the start of the 1947–48 Civil War in Mandatory Palestine, a number of anti-Jewish events occurred throughout the Arab world, some of which have been described as pogroms. In 1947, half of Aleppo's 10,000 Jews left the city in the wake of the Aleppo riots, while other anti-Jewish riots took place in British Aden and then in 1948 in the French Moroccan cities of Oujda and Jerada.

== Pogroms after 1948 ==
Anti-Jewish pogroms became much less frequent in more recent years. The last anti-Jewish pogrom in the UK was in 1947.

=== 1955 Istanbul pogrom ===
The Istanbul pogrom, also known as the Istanbul riots, were a series of state-sponsored anti-Greek mob attacks directed primarily at Istanbul's Greek minority on 6–7 September 1955. The pogrom was orchestrated by the governing Democrat Party in Turkey with the cooperation of various security organizations (Tactical Mobilisation Group, Counter-Guerrilla and National Security Service). The events were triggered by the bombing of the Turkish consulate in Thessaloniki, Greece, the house where Mustafa Kemal Atatürk was born in 1881. The bomb was actually planted by a Turkish usher at the consulate, who was later arrested and confessed. The Turkish press was silent about the arrest, and instead, it insinuated that Greeks had set off the bomb.

A Turkish mob, most of whose members were trucked into the city in advance, assaulted Istanbul's Greek community for nine hours. Although the mob did not explicitly call for the killing of Greeks, over a dozen people died during or after the attacks as a result of beatings and arson. Armenians and Jews were also harmed. The police were mostly ineffective, and the violence continued until the government declared martial law in Istanbul, called in the army and ordered it to put down the riots. The material damage was estimated at US$500 million (equivalent to $6 billion in 2025), including the burning of churches and the devastation of shops and private homes.

After the military coup of 1960, Prime Minister Adnan Menderes and Foreign Minister Fatin Rüştü Zorlu were convicted of inciting the pogrom in the Yassıada trials. Being found guilty in other cases, they were sentenced to death by hanging.

The pogrom, together with the 1964–1965 expulsion of Istanbul Greeks, initiated under İsmet İnönü’s CHP-led government, greatly accelerated the emigration of ethnic Greeks from Turkey. The Greek population of Turkey declined from 119,822 in 1927, to about 7,000 in 1978. In Istanbul alone, the Greek-speaking population decreased from 65,108 to 49,081 between 1955 and 1960. The 2008 figures released by the Turkish Foreign Ministry placed the number of Turkish citizens of Greek descent at 3,000–4,000; while according to the Human Rights Watch (2006) their number was estimated to be 2,500. The attacks have been described as a continuation of a process of Turkification that started with the decline of the Ottoman Empire, as roughly 40% of the properties attacked belonged to other minorities. The pogrom has been compared in some media to the Kristallnacht, the 1938 pogrom against Jews throughout Nazi Germany.

=== Sabra and Shatila massacre in 1982 ===
The Sabra and Shatila massacre is sometimes referred to as a pogrom. The perpetrators were "phalangist" militants connected to the Kataeb Party. On 16 September 1982 they entered the Sabra neighbourhood and Shatila refugee camp in southern Lebanon, and killed between 762 and 3,500 civilians, mostly Palestinian refugees and Lebanese Shia Muslims. In interviews with Lokman Sli some of the militants who committed the massacre reported that before the massacre, the IDF hosted them in training camps in Israel and showed them documentaries about the Holocaust. The Israeli trainers told the Lebanese phalangists that the Christian minority in Lebanon would face the same fate as the Jews of Europe if the fighters did not take action against the Palestinians.

=== 1984 anti-Sikh riots ===
Sikhs were targeted in Delhi and other parts of India during a pogrom in October 1984.

=== May 1998 pogrom of Chinese Indonesians ===
Indonesia's minority ethnic Chinese population were targeted in a pogrom in the lead-up to the downfall of the Suharto regime. The events were mainly in the cities of Medan, Jakarta, and Surakarta, with smaller incidents in other parts of Indonesia.

Under the Suharto regime, there had been rampant and systematic discrimination against Chinese Indonesians. During the pogrom, there were extensive looting and torching of Chinese Indonesian properties. There were also widespread murders and rape against this minority group.

== Pogroms and race riots in the 21st century ==
=== 2002 Gujarat pogrom ===
The 2002 Gujarat riots, also known as the Gujarat pogrom, were a three-day period of inter-communal violence in the Indian state of Gujarat.

The violence was connected to the Ayodhya dispute and the demolition of the Babri Masjid. The burning of a train in Godhra on 27 February 2002, which caused the deaths of 58 Hindu pilgrims and karsevaks returning from Ayodhya, is cited as having instigated the violence.

Following the initial riot incidents, there were further outbreaks of violence in Ahmedabad for three months; statewide, there were further outbreaks of violence against the minority Muslim population of Gujarat for the next year.

=== 2005 Cronulla riots ===
The 2005 Cronulla riots (also known as the "Cronulla Race Riots" or the "Cronulla pogrom") were a series of race riots in Sydney, New South Wales, Australia.

=== Attacks in the Israeli occupied West Bank in 2008 ===
In 2008, two attacks in the Occupied West Bank by Jewish Israeli settlers on Palestinian Arabs were labeled as pogroms by then-Prime Minister Ehud Olmert.

=== 2017 anti-Rohingya pogroms ===
The 2017 Rohingya genocide, was a series of pogroms and other violence committed against the Rohingya minority of Myanmar, particularly in Rakhine State. Facebook was accused of inciting mob violence via social media.

=== West Bank settler pogroms in the early 2020s ===
There were many attacks by Israeli settlers against Palestinians in the occupied West Bank leading up to and during the full-scale war in the Gaza Strip starting in 2023.

=== The Huwara rampage in February 2023 ===
On 26 February 2023, violent riots broke out from Israeli settlers in Huwara after two Israelis were shot and killed by a Palestinian gunman there earlier that afternoon. The rioters killed one Palestinian, 37-year-old Sameh Aqtash, and wounded dozens, while torching houses and cars.

Top Israeli general in the West Bank, Yehuda Fuchs, referred to the Israeli settlers' actions as a "pogrom": "The incident in Hawara was a pogrom carried out by outlaws," and Prime Minister Benjamin Netanyahu condemned "vigilantism".

Journalist Gideon Levy wrote an editorial in Haaretz saying that Israel's military had failed to stop the violence stating: "whether out of apathy and complacency, or because they were very deliberately turning a blind eye." A legal expert said that the rioters could face war crime charges if Israel did not conduct an investigation into the perpetrators.

Jewish American documentary maker Simone Zimmerman also used the term pogrom to describe the attacks on Palestinians by Israeli settlers in Hawara in February 2023. Zimmerman described these attacks as being committed by settlers while the Israeli army stood by and let it happen.

=== Hamas-initiated attacks on 7 October 2023 ===
On 7 October 2023, Hamas' Al Qassam Brigades militant wing (based in the Gaza Strip), and other groups and individuals incited to join them, initiated an attack on Israel. In addition to the military, the attack also targeted civilian communities and resulted in the deaths of over 695 Israeli civilians, most of whom were Israeli Jews and some of whom were Arab Israelis. In the attacks Al Qassam and other armed groups from Gaza also took approximately 250 people, many of which were non-Israelis hostage, including infants, elderly, and people who had already been severely injured.

The 7 October attacks were described as a "pogrom" by Suzanne Rutland, who defined a pogrom as a government-approved attack on Jews and pointed out that the attacks were initiated by the Hamas, the governing authority of Gaza. Others who have described the 7 October attacks as a pogrom include then-UK Foreign Secretary David Cameron, and think tanks such as the Jerusalem Center for Public Affairs. An editorial by the Wall Street Journal Editorial Board referred to 7 October attacks as a pogrom.

Survivors of October 7 have also described the attack on their kibbutzim as pogroms.

Some historians have objected to the characterisation of 7 October as a pogrom, saying the events on 7 October do not resemble the original historical pogroms in Russia. The Jerusalem Post described the 7 October attacks as "historically unique", as well as "foreseeable" and "expected". Judith Butler, controversially described the attacks as an "act of armed resistance".

Al Qassam Brigades militant wing (based in the Gaza Strip) initiated an attack on Israel, and incited other groups and individuals to join them. This resulted in the deaths of over 695 Israeli civilians, some of whom were Arab Israelis. In the attacks Al Qassam and other armed groups from Gaza also took approximately 250 people, many of which were non-Israelis hostage, including infants, elderly, and people who had already been severely injured. (Note: It was obligatory to take any wounded – including Israelis – to the nearest hospitals, all of which were in the Gaza Strip. However, their motives are questionable, and only the soldiers were allowed to be kept as prisoners of war after they recovered, but they kept the as well.)

The 7 October attacks were described as a "Pogrom" by Suzanne Rutland, who defined a Pogrom as a government approved attack on Jews and pointed out that the attacks were initiated by the Hamas Government of Gaza. This label is also used for 7 October by pro-Israel sources, such as the Jerusalem Center for Public Affairs. An editorial in the Wall Street Journal referred to 7 October attacks as a pogrom as well, while rejecting that label for the Huwara rampage in that same year.

Some sources from in Israel and in the Jewish diaspora have specifically objected to the characterisation of 7 October as a pogrom. saying the events on 7 October do not resemble the original historical pogroms in Russia. The Jerusalem Post described the 7 October attacks as "historically unique", as well as "foreseeable" and "expected". Judith Butler, controversially described the attacks as an "act of armed resistance".

=== West Bank pogroms in 2023 ===
Khirbet Zanuta, a Palestinian Bedouin village in the Hebron Governorate in the southern West Bank, 20 km (12 mi) south of Hebron, which was ethnically cleansed during the Gaza war. Some farmers remained or returned and the attacks continued. The location has previously been attacked in 2022.

In a surge of Israeli settlers' violence after the October 7 attacks by Hamas, 16 Palestinian villages of total population of about 1,000 were violently depopulated by settlers' pogroms or under the threat of pogrom, including Al-Qanoub (north of Hebron), Southern al-Nassariyah (Jordan Valley), Wadi al-Siq (south of Ramallah), Zanuta (South Hebron Hills), Ein al-Rashash (near Ramallah). In the hearings before the Israeli Supreme Court Palestinians complained that the Israeli police ignores complaints about settlers' violence and refuses to collect evidence.

Al-Qanoub pogroms (11 October to 1 November 2023), in the Palestinian village of Al-Qanoub Israeli settlers descended from the nearby settlement of Asfar and the adjacent outpost of Pnei Kedem, burned houses, set their dogs on the farm animals, and, at gunpoint, ordered the residents to leave or else they would be killed.

=== 2024 riots against Syrian refugees in Turkey ===
In 2024 there were pogroms against Syrian refugees in Turkey.

=== November 2024 Amsterdam riots ===
The November 2024 Amsterdam riots preceding and following the AFC Ajax - Maccabi Tel Aviv football match were described by some as a "pogrom". Israeli diplomat Danny Danon stated that, "We are receiving very disturbing reports of extreme violence against Israelis and Jews on the streets of Holland. There is a pogrom currently taking place in Europe in 2024". The Mayor of Amsterdam later said that the word "pogrom" was inappropriate and that it had been misused as "propaganda". In the weeks after the event, the initial media coverage was widely criticized for misrepresenting the event. Targets of the violence included Israeli Maccabi Tel Aviv fans, an Arab taxi driver, and pro-Palestinian protestors. In the run-up to the match, some Maccabi Tel Aviv fans were filmed pulling Palestinian flags from houses, making anti-Arab chants such as "Death to Arabs", assaulting people, and vandalising local property. Calls to target Israeli supporters were subsequently shared via social media.

=== 2026 Northern Ireland riots ===
The 2026 Northern Ireland riots in Belfast have been described as a "race-based pogrom" by Belfast MP Claire Hanna. Following a stabbing attack by a Sudanese man, numerous cars and houses were set on fire. Masked men were reportedly seen breaking down front doors and chasing out residents.

== List of events named pogroms ==
Scope: This is a partial list of events for which one of the commonly accepted names includes the word pogrom. Inclusion in this list is based solely on evidence in multiple reliable sources that a name including the word pogrom is one of the accepted names for that event. A reliable source that merely describes the event as being a pogrom does not qualify the event for inclusion in this list. The word pogrom must appear in the source as part of a name for the event.

Date	Pogrom name	Other name(s)	Deaths	Targeted group	Physical destruction	Location and region (Note: Regions: Americas; Europe (including Russia); Middle East and North Africa (MENA); Pacific; South Asia; Sub-Saharan Africa)	Notes	Name needs verification
38	Alexandrian pogrom (name disputed) (Note: Prof. Sandra Gambetti: "A final note on the use of terminology related to anti-Semitism. Scholars have frequently labeled the Alexandrian events of 38 C.E. as the first pogrom in history and have often explained them in terms of an ante litteram explosion of anti-Semitism. This work [The Alexandrian Riots] deliberately avoids any words or expressions that in any way connect, explicitly or implicitly, the Alexandrian events of 38 C.E. to later events in modern or contemporary Jewish experience, for which that terminology was created. ... To decide whether a word like pogrom, for example, is an appropriate term to describe the events that are studied here, requires a comparative re-discussion of two historical frames—the Alexandria of 38 C.E. and the Russia of the end of the nineteenth century.")	Alexandrian riots		Jews in Egypt		MENA: Roman Egypt	(Note: Aulus Avilius Flaccus, the Egyptian prefect of Alexandria appointed by Tiberius in 32 CE, may have encouraged the outbreak of violence in which Jews were pushed out of the city of Alexandria and blockaded into a Jewish "ghetto". Those trying to escape the ghetto were killed, dismembered, and some burnt alive. Philo wrote that Flaccus was later arrested and eventually executed for his part in this event. Scholarly research around the subject has been divided on certain points, including whether the Alexandrian Jews fought to keep their citizenship or to acquire it, whether they evaded the payment of the poll-tax or prevented any attempts to impose it on them, and whether they were safeguarding their identity against the Greeks or against the Egyptians.)	
1066	Granada pogrom	1066 Granada massacre	4,000 Jews	Jews		Europe: Iberian Peninsula	(Note: A mob stormed the royal palace in Granada, which was at that time in Muslim-ruled al-Andalus, assassinated the Jewish vizier Joseph ibn Naghrela and massacred much of the Jewish population of the city.)	
1096	1096 pogroms	Rhineland massacres	2,000 Jews	Jews		Europe: Germany	(Note: Peasant crusaders from France and Germany during the People's Crusade, led by Peter the Hermit (and not sanctioned by the hierarchy of the Catholic Church, attacked Jewish communities in the three towns of Speyer, Worms and Mainz.)	
1113	Kiev pogrom (name disputed) (Note: John Klier: "upon the death of the Grand Prince of Kiev Sviatopolk, rioting broke out in Kiev against his agents and the town administration. The disorders were not specifically directed against Jews and they are best characterized as a social revolution. This fact has not prevented historians of medieval Russia from describing them as a pogrom." Klier also writes that Alexander Pereswetoff-Morath has advanced a strong argument against considering the Kiev riots of 1113 an anti-Jewish pogrom. Pereswetoff-Morath writes in "A Grin without a Cat" (2002) that "I feel that Birnbaum's use of the term "anti-Semitism' as well as, for example, his use of 'pogrom' in references to medieval Rus are not warranted by the evidence he presents. He is, of course, aware that it may be controversial." George Vernadsky: "Incidentally, one should not suppose that the movement was anti-Semitic. There was no general Jewish pogrom. Wealthy Jewish merchants suffered because of their association with Sviatopolk's speculations, especially his hated monopoly on salt.")	Kiev revolt		Jews and others.		Europe: Ukraine in the 12th century	(Note: A rebellion which was sparked by the death of the Grand Prince of Kiev, in which Jews who participated in the prince's economic affairs were some of the victims.)	
1349	Strasbourg pogrom	Strasbourg massacre	persecution of Jews during the Black Death	Jews		Europe: Strasbourg	(Note: this massacre coincided with the persecution of Jews during the Black Death.)	
1391	1391 pogroms	Massacre of 1391		Jews		Europe: Iberian Peninsula	(Note: A series of massacres and forced conversions beginning on 4 June 1391 in the city of Seville before they extend to the rest of Castile and the Crown of Aragon. It is considered one of the Middle Ages' largest attacks on the Jews, and were ultimately expelled from the Iberian Peninsula in 1492.)	
1506	Lisbon pogrom	Lisbon massacre	1,000+ New Christians	Jewish converts to Christianity		Europe: Iberian Peninsula	(Note: After an episode of famine and bad harvests, a pogrom happened in Lisbon, Portugal, in which more than 1,000 "New Christian" (forcibly converted Jews) people were slaughtered or burnt by an angry Christian mob, in the first night of what became known as the "Lisbon Massacre". The killing occurred from 19 to 21 April, almost eliminating the entire Jewish or Jewish-descended community in that city. Even the Portuguese military and the king himself had difficulty stopping it. Today the event is remembered with a monument in S. Domingos' church.)	
1563	Polotsk pogrom (name disputed) (Note: John Klier: "Russian armies led by Tsar Ivan IV captured the Polish city of Polotsk. The Tsar ordered drowned in the river Dvina all Jews who refused to convert to Orthodox Christianity. This episode certainly demonstrates the overt religious hostility towards the Jews which was very much a part of Muscovite culture, but its conversionary aspects were entirely absent from modern pogroms. Nor were the Jews the only heterodox religious group singled out for the tender mercies of Muscovite religious fanaticism.")	Polotsk drownings		Jews who refused to convert		Europe: Polotsk	(Note: Following the fall of Polotsk to the army of Ivan IV, all those who refused to convert to Orthodox Christianity were ordered drowned in the Western Dvina river.)	
1648–1657	Khmelnytsky pogrom (name disputed)	Khmelnytsky massacres, or Cossack riots.	100,000	Jews		Europe: Polish–Lithuanian Commonwealth	(Note: Eastern Polish–Lithuanian Commonwealth Cossack riots, aka pogroms, aka uprisings included massive atrocities committed against Jews in what is today Ukraine, in numbers (conservatively estimated here by Veidlinger, Ataskevitch & Bemporad). They resulted in the creation of a new Hetmantate.)	
1821–1871	First Odessa pogroms			Jews		Europe: Russian Empire	(Note: The Greeks of Odessa attacked the local Jewish community, in what began as economic disputes.)	
1834	1834 Hebron pogrom	Battle of Hebron	500 Palestinians and 12 Jews (and 260 Ottoman troops)	Palestinians and Jews				
1834	1834 Safed pogrom	1834 looting of Safed		Jews				
1840		Damascus affair		Jews		MENA: Syria	(Note: Following accusations of Jews having conspired to murder a Christian monk for culinary purposes, the local population attacked Jewish businesses and committed acts of violence against the Jewish population.)	
1881–1884	First Russian Tsarist pogroms	Anti-Jewish pogroms in the Russian Empire		Jews		Europe: Russian Empire	(Note: A large-scale wave of anti-Jewish riots swept through south-western Imperial Russia (present-day Ukraine and Poland from 1881 to 1884 (in that period over 200 anti-Jewish events occurred in the Russian Empire, notably the Kiev, Warsaw and Odessa pogroms))	
1881	Warsaw pogrom		2 Jews killed, 24 injured	Jews		Europe: Poland	(Note: Three days of rioting against Jews, Jewish stores, businesses, and residences in the streets adjoining the Holy Cross Church.)	
1902	Częstochowa pogrom (name disputed)		14 Jews	Jews		Europe: Russian Partition	(Note: A mob attacked the Jewish shops, killing fourteen Jews and one gendarme. The Russian military brought to restore order were stoned by mob.)	
1903–1906	Second Anti-Jewish pogroms in the Russian Empire	Anti-Jewish pogroms in the Russian Empire	2,000+ Jews	Jews; Antisemitism in the Russian Empire		Europe: Russian Empire	(Note: A much bloodier wave of pogroms broke out from 1903 to 1906, leaving an estimated 2,000 Jews dead and many more wounded, as many Jewish residents took arms to defend their families and property from the attackers. The 1905 pogrom against the Jewish population in Odessa was the most serious pogrom of the period, with reports of up to 2,500 Jews killed.)	
1903	First Kishinev pogrom	Anti-Jewish pogroms in the Russian Empire	47 (Included above)	Jews; Antisemitism in the Russian Empire		Europe: Kishinev, Russian Empire	(Note: Three days of anti-Jewish rioting sparked by antisemitic articles in local newspapers.)	
1905	Second Kishinev pogrom	Anti-Jewish pogroms in the Russian Empire	19 (Included above)	Jews; Antisemitism in the Russian Empire		Europe: Kishinev, Russian Empire	(Note: Two days of anti-Jewish rioting beginning as political protests against the Tsar.)	
1905	Kiev pogrom (1905)	Anti-Jewish pogroms in the Russian Empire	100 (Included above)	Jews; Antisemitism in the Russian Empire		Europe: Ukraine,	(Note: Following a city hall meeting, a mob was drawn into the streets, proclaiming that "all Russia's troubles stemmed from the machinations of the Jews and socialists.")	
1906	Siedlce pogrom	Anti-Jewish pogroms in the Russian Empire	26 (Included above)	Jews; Antisemitism in the Russian Empire		Europe: Siedlce Russian Empire	(Note: An attack organized by the Russian secret police Okhrana . Antisemitic pamphlets had been distributed for over a week and before any unrest begun, a curfew was declared.)	
1904	Limerick pogrom (name disputed) (Note: Israeli ambassador to Ireland, Boaz Moda'i: "I think it is a bit over-portrayed, meaning that, usually if you look up the word pogrom it is used in relation to slaughter and being killed. This is what happened in many other places in Europe, but that is not what happened here. There was a kind of boycott against Jewish merchandise for a while but that's not a pogrom.")	Limerick boycott	None	Jews		Europe: Ireland	(Note: An economic boycott waged against the small Jewish community in Limerick, Ireland, for over two years.)	
1909	Adana pogrom	Adana massacre	30,000 Armenians	Armenians		MENA / Europe: Caucasus	(Note: A massacre of Armenians in the city of Adana amidst the government upheaval resulted in a series of anti-Armenian pogroms throughout the district.)	
1910	Slocum pogrom	Slocum massacre	6 Blacks confirmed; 100 Blacks estimated	African Americans		Americas: USA	(Note: A massacre of African Americans living in Slocum, Texas, organized by white mobs after rumors of a Black uprising began to spread. White people throughout Anderson County gathered guns, ammunition, and alcohol to prepare. District Judge Benjamin Howard Gardner attempted to stop the massacre by closing all saloons, gun stores, and hardware stores, but it was too late. The massacre lasted 16 hours, with white mobs killing any Black people they saw. As a result of the massacre, half of Slocum's Black population had left or been killed by the next census.)	
1914	Anti-Serb riots in Sarajevo	Sarajevo frenzy of hate	2 Serbs	Serbs		Europe: Balkans	(Note: Occurred shortly after the assassination of Archduke Franz Ferdinand.)	
1918	Lwów pogrom	Lemberg massacre	52–150 Jews; 270 Ukrainians	Jews		Europe: Jews in Poland	(Note: During the Polish-Ukrainian War over three days of unrest in the city, an estimated 52–150 Jewish residents were killed and hundreds more were injured by Polish soldiers and civilians. Two hundred and seventy Ukrainians were also killed during this incident. The Poles did not stop the pogrom until two days after it began.)	
1919	Proskurov pogrom		1500–1700 Jews	Jews		Europe: Proskurov	(Note: The pogrom was initiated by Ivan Samosenko following a failed Bolshevik uprising against the Ukrainian People's Republic in the city. The massacre was carried out by Ukrainian People's Republic soldiers of Samosenko. According to historians Yonah Alexander and Kenneth Myers the soldiers marched into the centre of town accompanied by a military band and engaged in atrocities under the slogan: "Kill the Jews and save Ukraine." They were ordered to save the ammunition in the process and use only lances and bayonets.)	
1919	Elaine Pogrom	Elaine massacre	250-800+ African Americans	African Americans		Americas: United States	(Note: A massive African American pogrom in Elaine, Arkansas USA carried out by local White Americans, local police and Federal troops. Considered one of the largest Pogrom carried out in the United States)	
1919	Kiev pogroms (1919)		60+	Jews		Europe: Ukrainian Soviet Socialist Republic	(Note: A series of anti-Jewish pogroms in various places around Kiev carried out by White Army troops)	
1919	Pinsk pogrom (name disputed) (Note: Carole Fink: "What happened in Pinsk on April 5, 1919 was not a literal "pogrom" – an organized, officially tolerated or inspired massacre of a minority such as the massacre which occurred in Lemberg – instead, it was a military execution of a small, suspect group of civilians. ... The misnamed "Pinsk pogrom", a plain, powerful, alliterative phrase, entered history in April 1919. Its importance lay not only in its timing, during the tensest moments of the Paris Peace Conference and the most crucial deliberations over Poland's political future: The reports of Pinsk once more demonstrated the swift transmission of local violence to world notice and the disfiguring process of rumor and prejudice on every level.")	Pinsk massacre	36 Jews	Jews		Europe: Pinsk, Belarus / Poland.	(Note: Mass execution of 35 Jewish residents of Pinsk in April 1919 by the Polish Army, during the opening stages of the Polish–Soviet War)	
1919–20	Vilna pogrom	Vilna offensive	65+ Jews and non-Jews	Jews and others		Europe: Vilna	(Note: As Polish troops entered the city, dozens of people connected with the Lit-Bel were arrested, and some were executed.)	
1920	Shusha pogrom	Shusha massacre	500–20,000 Armenians	Armenians		MENA / Europe: Caucasus	(Note: A massacre (sometimes also referred to as a pogrom) of the Armenian population in the city of Shusha, conducted by armed Azeri soldiers and civilians; it took place as a more extreme measure after the similarly Armenian-targeted Khaibalikend massacre.)	
1923	Kantō pogrom	Kantō Massacre	6000+	Koreans and Chinese		East Asia: Empire of Japan	(Note: Following the 1923 Great Kantō earthquake, rumors spread that Koreans in Japan were poisoning wells, after which Japanese militarists murdered at least 6000 Koreans and some Chinese.)	
1929	Hebron pogrom	Hebron massacre	67 Jews	Jews		MENA: Mandatory Palestine	(Note: During the 1929 Palestine riots, sixty-seven Jews were killed as the violence spread to Hebron, then part of Mandatory Palestine, by Arabs incited to violence by rumors that Jews were massacring Arabs in Jerusalem and seizing control of Muslim holy places.)	
1934	1934 Thrace pogroms		None	Jews		MENA / Europe: Turkey	(Note: It was followed by the vandalizing of Jewish houses and shops. The tensions started in June 1934 and spread to a few other villages in Eastern Thrace region and to some small cities in Western Aegean region. At the height of the violent events, it was rumoured that a rabbi was stripped naked and was dragged through the streets shamefully while his daughter was raped. Over 15,000 Jews had to flee from the region.)	
1936	Przytyk pogrom	Przytyk riot	2 Jews and 1 Polish	Jews		Europe: Poland	(Note: Some of the Jewish residents gathered in the town square in anticipation of the attack by the peasants, but nothing happened on that day. Two days later, however, on a market day, as historians Martin Gilbert and David Vital state, peasants attacked their Jewish neighbors.)	
1938	November pogrom	Kristallnacht	91+ Jews	Jews		Europe: Nazi Germany	(Note: Coordinated attacks against Jews throughout Nazi Germany and parts of Austria, carried out by SA paramilitary forces and non-Jewish civilians. Accounts from the foreign journalists working in Germany sent shock waves around the world.)	
1940	Dorohoi pogrom		53 Jews	Jews		Europe: Romania	(Note: Romanian military units carried out a pogrom against the local Jews, during which, according to an official Romanian report, 53 Jews were murdered, and dozens injured.)	
1941	Iași pogrom		13,266 Jews	Jews		Europe: Romania	(Note: One of the most violent pogroms in Jewish history, launched by governmental forces in the Romanian city of Iași (Jassy) against its Jewish population.)	
1941	Antwerp Pogrom	part of the Holocaust in Belgium	0	Jews		Europe: Belgium	(Note: One of the few pogroms of Belgian history. Flemish collaborators attacked and burned synagogues and attacked a rabbi in the city of Antwerp)	
1941	Bucharest pogrom	Legionnaires' rebellion	125 Jews and 30 soldiers	Jews		Europe: Bucharest, Hungary	(Note: As the privileges of the paramilitary organisation Iron Guard were being cut off by Conducător Ion Antonescu, members of the Iron Guard, also known as the Legionnaires, revolted. During the rebellion and pogrom, the Iron Guard killed 125 Jews and 30 soldiers died in the confrontation with the rebels.)	
1941	Tykocin pogrom		1,400–1,700 Jews	Jews		Europe: Poland	(Note: Mass murder of Jewish residents of Tykocin in occupied Poland during World War II, soon after Nazi German attack on the Soviet Union.)	
1941	Jedwabne pogrom		380 to 1,600 Jews	Jews		Europe: Poland	(Note: The local rabbi was forced to lead a procession of about 40 people to a pre-emptied barn, killed and buried along with fragments of a destroyed monument of Lenin. A further 250–300 Jews were led to the same barn later that day, locked inside and burned alive using kerosene.)	
1941	Farhud		180 Jewish Iraqis	Jews		MENA: Iraq	(Note: 180 Jews were killed and over 1,000 injured in attacks on Shavuot following British victory in the Anglo-Iraqi War.)	
1941	Glina Pogrom	Glina massacre, genocide	2400 Serbs	Serbs	churches, businesses and houses	Europe: Balkans	(Note: The Glina pogrom occurred in WWII Independent State of Croatia on the night of May 12th to 13th, 1941 is particularly synonymous with genocide of the Serbs in World War II. Axis Croatian Forces organized attack in the city of Glina and destroyed against around 400 Serb civilians and a Serbian Orthodox church parish, bolted the doors, stabbed and shot into the crowd and then set the church on fire, by six Ustashas, led by Vjekoslav Luburić. The Serbs, who previously forced to converte to Catholicism, were spared for short time, later killed. Several waves of murders followed in early August of the same year, in which a total of 2,400 Serb civilians were murdered. Immediately after the massacre became known, the Croatian Roman Catholic Zagreb Archbishop Alojzije Stepinac wrote a protest to the Ante Pavelić on May 14, 1941. However, Ante Pavelić doesn't responded.)	
1941	Lviv pogroms		Thousands of Jews	Jews		Europe: Ukrainian Soviet Socialist Republic	(Note: Massacres of Jews by the Ukrainian People's Militia and a German Einsatzgruppe.)	
1945	Kraków pogrom		1 Jew	Jews		Europe: Poland	(Note: Violence amid rumors of kidnappings of children by Jews.)	
1946	Kunmadaras pogrom		4 Jews	Jews		Europe: Hungary	(Note: A frenzy instigated by the crowd's libelous belief that some Jews had made sausage out of Christian children.)	
1946	Miskolc pogrom		2 Jews	Jews		Europe: Hungary	(Note: Riots started as demonstrations against economic hardships and later became antisemitic.)	
1946	Kielce pogrom		38–42 Jews	Jews		Europe: Poland	(Note: Violence against the Jewish community centre, initiated by Polish Communist armed forces LWP, KBW, GZI WP and continued by a mob of local townsfolk.)	
1955	Istanbul pogrom	Istanbul riots	13–30 Greeks	Greeks in Turkey (Ottoman Greeks)		MENA / Europe: Turkey	(Note: Organized mob attacks directed primarily at Istanbul's Greek minority. Accelerated the emigration of ethnic Greeks from Turkey (Jews were also targeted in this event).)	
1956	1956 anti-Tamil pogrom		150 Primarily Tamils	Tamils		South Asia: Sri Lanka	(Note: 1956 anti-Tamil pogrom or Gal Oya massacre/riots were the first ethnic riots that targeted the minority Tamils in independent Sri Lanka.)	
1958	1958 anti-Tamil pogrom	58 riots	300 Primarily Tamils	Tamils		South Asia: Sri Lanka	(Note: 1958 anti-Tamil pogrom also known as 58 riots, refer to the first island wide ethnic riots and pogrom in Sri Lanka.)	
1959		Kirkuk massacre	79	Iraqi Turkmen		MENA: Iraq	(Note: Ethnic tension between Kurds and Turkmen.)	
1966	1966 anti-Igbo pogrom		30,000-50,000 Primarily Igbo People	Igbo		Sub-Saharan Africa: Nigeria	(Note: A series of massacres directed at Igbo and other southern Nigerian residents throughout Nigeria before and after the overthrow (and assassination) of the Aguiyi-Ironsi junta by Murtala Mohammed.)	
14–15 August 1969	1969 Northern Ireland Anti-Catholic pogroms	1969 Northern Ireland riots	6 Catholics (Note: 6 Catholics were killed, 4 by state force & 2 by anti-Catholic mob.)	Catholics		Europe: Northern Ireland	(Note: Along with the 6 murders, 500 Irish Catholics were injured by the state forces and anti-Catholic mob, 72 of those injured were injured from gun shot wounds, also 150+ Catholic homes and 275+ businesses had been destroyed – 83% of all buildings destroyed were owned by Catholics. Catholics generally fled across the border into the Republic of Ireland as refugees. After Belfast the other areas that saw violence were Newry, Armagh, Crossmaglen, Dungannon, Coalisland and Dungiven. The bloodiest clashes were in Belfast, where seven people were killed and hundreds wounded, in what some viewed as an attempted pogrom against the Catholic minority. Protesters clashed with both the police and with loyalists, who attacked Catholic districts. Scores of homes and businesses were burnt out, most of them owned by Catholics, and thousands of mostly Catholic families were driven from their homes. In some cases, RUC officers helped the loyalists and failed to protect Catholic areas.)	
1977	1977 anti-Tamil pogrom		300-1500 Primarily Tamils	Tamils		South Asia: Sri Lanka	(Note: The 1977 anti-Tamil pogrom followed the 1977 general elections in Sri Lanka where the Sri Lankan Tamil nationalistic Tamil United Liberation Front won a plurality of minority Sri Lankan Tamil votes in which it stood for secession.)	
1978	Malatya pogrom	Malatya massacre	8 Alevis	Alevis	businesses and houses	MENA / Europe: Turkey		
1978	Maraş pogrom	Maraş massacre	111 to 500+ Alevis	Alevis	businesses, houses, printing works, pharmaiescy	MENA / Europe: Turkey		
1980	Çorum pogrom	Çorum massacre	57 Alevis	Alevis	businesses and houses	MENA / Europe: Turkey		
1983	Black July	1983 anti-Tamil pogrom	400–3,000 Tamils	Tamils		South Asia: Sri Lanka	(Note: Over seven days mobs of mainly Sinhalese attacked Tamil targets, burning, looting and killing.)	
1984	1984 anti-Sikh riots		8,000 Sikhs	Sikhs		South Asia: India	(Note: Sikhs were targeted in Delhi and other parts of India during a pogrom in October 1984.)	
1988	Sumgait pogrom		26 to 300 Armenians	Armenians		MENA / Europe: Caucasus	(Note: Mobs made up largely of ethnic Azeris formed into groups that went on to attack and kill Armenians both on the streets and in their apartments; widespread looting and a general lack of concern from police officers allowed the situation to worsen.)	
1988	Kirovabad pogrom		3+ Soviet soldiers 3+ Azeris and 1+ Armenian	Armenians		MENA / Europe: Caucasus	(Note: Ethnic Azeris attacked Armenians throughout the city.)	
1990	Baku pogrom		90 Armenians; 20 Russian soldiers	Armenians		MENA / Europe: Caucasus	(Note: Seven-day attack during which Armenians were beaten, tortured, murdered and expelled from the city. There were also many raids on apartments, robberies and Parsons.)	
1991	Crown Heights pogrom (disputed) (Note: Media use of the term pogrom to refer to the 1991 Crown Heights riot caused public controversy. For example, Joyce Purnick of The New York Times wrote in 1993 that the use of the word pogrom was "inflammatory"; she accused politicians of "trying to enlarge and twist the word" in order to "pander to Jewish voters".)	Crown Heights riot	2 (1 Jew and 1 non-Jew)	Jews in the USA		Americas: United States	(Note: A three-day riot that occurred in the Crown Heights section of Brooklyn, New York. The riots incited by the death of the seven-year-old Gavin Cato, unleashed simmering tensions within Crown Heights' black community against the Orthodox Jewish community. In its wake, several Jews were seriously injured; one Orthodox Jewish man, Yankel Rosenbaum, was killed; and a non-Jewish man, allegedly mistaken by rioters for a Jew, was killed by a group of African-American men.)	
1995	"Srebrenica pogrom"	Srebrenica massacre, genocide	8000 Muslims	Muslims (Bosniaks)		Europe: Balkans	(Note: The Srebrenica massacre, also known as the Srebrenica genocide, was the July 1995 killing of more than 8,000 Bosniak Muslim men and boys in and around the town of Srebrenica, during the Bosnian War. The killings were perpetrated by units of the Bosnian Serb Army of Republika Srpska (VRS) under the command of Ratko Mladić. The Scorpions, a paramilitary unit from Serbia, who had been part of the Serbian Interior Ministry until 1991, also participated in the massacre.)	
2002	Gujarat pogrom	2002 Gujarat riots	790 to 2000 (Note: 790 Muslims and 254 Hindus (official) 1,926 to 2,000+ total (other sources))	Muslims in India		South Asia: Gujarat, India		
2004	March pogrom	2004 unrest in Kosovo	16 ethnic Serbs	Serbs		Europe: Balkans	(Note: Over 4,000 Serbs were forced to leave their homes, 935 Serb houses, 10 public facilities and 35 Serbian Orthodox church-buildings were desecrated, damaged or destroyed, and six towns and nine villages were ethnically cleansed.)	
2005	Cronulla pogrom	Cronulla Race Riots		Muslims and Arab Australians (Note: Muslims in Australia and Arab Australians and people misidentified as belonging to those groups.)		Pacific: Cronulla in Sydney, Australia.		
2013	Muzaffarnagar Pogrom			Muslims in India		South Asia: Muzaffarnagar, Uttar Pradesh, India		
2017	Rohingya pogrom	Rohingya genocide		Muslims in Myanmar (Rohingya)	housing	South Asia: Rakhine State, Myanmar	(Note: Facebook was accused of inciting mob violence.)	
2023	Huwara pogrom	Huwara rampage	1 Sameh Aqtash	Palestinians	cars and businesses	MENA: West Bank, Palestine.		
Date	Pogrom Name	Other name(s)	Deaths	Targeted Group	Physical Destruction	Region	Notes	Name needs verification

== See also ==
General information

- Backlash (sociology)
- Conspiracy theory
- Dehumanization
- Demonization
- Discrimination
- Ethnic cleansing
- Ethnic conflict
- Ethnic penalty
- Ethnic violence
- Ethnocentrism
- Ethnocide
- Genocidal massacre
- Hate crime
- Hate group
- Hate speech
- Hate studies
- Nativism (politics)
- Moral panic
- Oppression
- Persecution
- Racism
- Religious discrimination
- Religious fanaticism
- Religious intolerance
- Religious persecution
- Religious segregation
- Religious violence
- Scapegoating
- Sectarian violence
- Supremacism
- Xenophobia

Jews

- Antisemitism
- Antisemitism in Christianity
- Antisemitism in Islam
- Antisemitism by country
- History of antisemitism
- Expulsions and exoduses of Jews
- Jewish history
- Persecution of Jews
- Racial antisemitism
- Religious antisemitism

Other groups

- Armenian genocide
- Hindutva
- Israeli settler violence
- Palestinian genocide allegations
  - Gaza genocide
- Persecution of Muslims in Myanmar
  - Rohingya conflict
    - Rohingya genocide
