= Justingrad =

Coordinates: 49°54′55″N 30°13′38″E

Justingrad Юстинград
- Interactive map of Justingrad
- Country: Ukraine
- Oblast: Cherkasy
- Raion: Uman
- First settled: early-mid 19th century
- Destroyed: July 1941

Population (2023)
  - Total: 0

Justingrad (Russian: Юстинград; Yiddish: יוסטינגראָד Yustingrod; also transliterated Yustingrad or Ustingrad) was a Jewish community in present-day Uman Raion, Ukraine. The Justingrad shtetl was created after Jews were forced out of their homes in the village of Sokolivka, Cherkasy Oblast. These Jews from Sokolivka moved to the land on the other side of a quarter mile bridge/dam across a lake edge. This shtetl was named Justingrad in honor of Justina, wife of the nobleman who sold the land to the Jews. Many of these Ukrainian Jews left for a better life in the United States around 1900.

In August 1919, a pogrom made its way through Justingrad. Jewish men were murdered and Jewish women were defiled. With World War II, on July 27, 1941, the Nazis destroyed Justingrad. Currently, the land of former Justingrad is used as farmland and grazing for livestock from those of neighboring villages.

In 1966, Joseph Gilman traveled to the area, in order to compile documents regarding the Kaprov family from the Sokolivka/Justingrad area. This was published as a book in the US in 1969. In 1966, Justingrad was nonexistent as a village or shtetl; the land was used as a cow pasture. However the Justingrad shtetl sign was still there.

== History ==
The Jewish community of Sokolivka appeared in the second half of the 18th century. In 1760, the owner of Sokolivka, Francis Pototski, issued a decree exempting all Christians and Jews who wished to settle in the town from taxes on spirits, beer and honey for three years. By 1765, approximately 585 Jews lived in Sokolivka and the surrounding villages.

Jewish persecution was common in European nations for thousands of years for a number of reasons, and the Russian Empire was no exception. In 1825, Nicholas I issued a law restricting the rights of Jews to choose their place of residence and occupation. A military settlement was set up in Sokolivka and the Jewish population was expelled. Directly across the Ros River from Sokolivka was undeveloped land with rich soil, perfect for settlement. The Jews of Sokolivka desperately pleaded with the owner of the land, a noblewoman named Justina, (some sources say Justina's husband owned the land) for access. When Justina sold them the land, they named the new settlement "Justina's town" — "Justingrad" in gratitude. Although this was the town's official name, most still referred to it as Sokolivka, as they were still bitter about their expulsion. Over time, the new settlement grew into a town. In 1852, the rabbi Reb Gedaliah Aharon, a famous Tzaddik in the city of Illintsi, settled in Justingrad; with him came his many (Chassidim) followers. The settlement continued to grow as non-Jewish farmers began settling the area. Strong relationships in trade and in occasional employment developed between the settlers and the Jews. By 1897 the total number of inhabitants reached 3,194, of whom 2,521 were Jews and 673 non–Jews. Over the years, four synagogues were built in Justingrad, twelve melamdim, each with their own cheder. Libraries, schools, and banks were built. In the mid-19th century, the local population consisted of 2,349 Orthodox Christians and 502 Jews, but by 1900, the Jewish population had tripled to 2,521.

With the start of the Russian Revolution, the Jews of Justingrad organized a self-defense unit which patrolled the town and occasionally stopped bandits in the night. Christians from nearby villages came to seize arms from the Jews, and when they refused a number of them were thrown into the Ros River, though many were saved by residents of Sokolivka who then assisted them in chasing off the bandits. On another occasion a group of 150 bandits held the shtetl hostage and demanded 500,000 rubles and all of the Jews' clothing. Sokolivka's residents again came to the rescue, alerting a troop of Bolsheviks nearby who routed out the bandits under its Jewish commander. However, such luck would not last. In the night the bandits returned and began looting the town. At daylight, the bandits seized all the town's young men, dragging them into a synagogue and imprisoning them there. They then demanded a "war tax" of no less than a million rubles to be delivered in a matter of two hours. As the money could not be procured, every two hours Jews were taken from the synagogue and murdered in groups of ten. The Jews amassed all they could and delivered a little more than half of the bandits' demanded amount. The bandits took the money but refused to release their hostages. They began looting stores, shooting men, raping women, and whipping Jewish children. At sunset they began to leave Justingrad, taking those who remained in the synagogue as captives. At the town's edge, the bandits were confronted by the Green armies, but instead of rescuing the civilians they merely warned the bandits not to aid the Bolsheviks across the river. Instead the Jews were murdered and thrown into the river. When some parents ran to the bridge connecting Justingrad and Sokolivka and begged for their children's release, they too were killed. When the captives begged the Green armies to aid them, even offering themselves as soldiers, the latter ordered the bandits to kill them quicker. More than 150 people were killed.

After the massacre, raids on Justingrad became daily occurrences for several years. On September 25, 1919 Anton Denikin laid the Tsar's armies through Justingrad, much of the town was razed and looted by his soldiers. Months later, when Denikin's army had been defeated, their retreat brought them back to Justingrad, where again they destroyed much of the town through looting and fire, but this time they sported a civilian death count of 200. Jews that survived were stripped by the soldiers and dragged into the December snow to die an agonizing death in the cold. Pogroms carried out by Denikin and his forces would kill more than 150,000 Jews all across the Russian Empire.

The shtetl was destroyed. By 1926 less than 25% of Justingrad's former population remained in the ruins. On the onset of World War II, 150 Jews lived in Justingrad. The village was occupied on July 24, 1941. Soon after the occupation, all Jews were registered and ordered to wear a badge with a six-pointed star. Jews were deported and murdered in the months that followed. Justingrad was finally destroyed forever by the end of the war. The last Jew of Justingrad died years later in Sokolivka, and was buried in the local cemetery.
