= Kiev pogrom (1905) =

Anti-Jewish pogrom in 1905

The Kiev pogrom of October 18-October 20 (October 31-November 2, 1905, N.S.) came as a result of the collapse of the city hall meeting of October 18, 1905 in Kiev in the Russian Empire. Consequently, a mob was drawn into the streets. Among the perpetrators were monarchists, reactionaries, anti-Semites, and common criminals, proclaiming that "all Russia's troubles stemmed from the machinations of the Jews and socialists." The pogrom resulted in a massacre of approximately 100 Jews.

== History ==
According to William C. Fuller,

There ensued the horrific Kiev pogrom of October 18–20 (October 31-November 2), an orgy of looting, raping, and murder chiefly directed against the factories, the shops, homes, and persons of the Jews. This riot claimed the lives of between forty-seven and one hundred people and resulted in serious injury to at least three hundred more as well as the destruction of between 10 and 40 million rubles of property. This pogrom and the others that swept southern Russian Empire at approximately the same time were so annihilative that, in the words of Simon Dubnow, taken together they amounted to 'Russia's St. Bartholomew's night'.

The events building up to the Kiev pogrom included a country-wide wave of Jewish pogroms in a number of towns in southern Russian Empire. According to the Jewish Encyclopedia, "anti-Jewish riots (Pogromy) broke out in Elizabethgrad (April 27, 28), Kiev (May 8–11), Shpola (May 9), Ananiv (May 9), Wasilkov (May 10), Konotop (May 10), and during the following six months, in one hundred and sixty other places of southern Russia...It was clear that the riots were premeditated. To give but one example—a week before the pogrom of Kiev broke out, Von Hubbenet, chief of police of Kiev, warned some of his Jewish friends of the coming riots."

In the opinion of "a Russian from Kiev", published in Prince Vladimir Meshchersky's journal, Grazhdanin (The Citizen), as quoted by Vladimir Lenin,

The atmosphere in which we are living is suffocating; wherever you go there is whispering, plotting; everywhere there is blood lust, everywhere the stench of the informer, everywhere hatred, everywhere mutterings, everywhere groans....

Historian Shlomo Lambroza, not trusting the police sources, used data from opposition materials and counted 3,103 murdered Jews for the entire country of Russia during the 1905-1906 wave of pogroms.

== See also ==
- Kiev pogroms (1919)
- Kiev pogrom (1881)
- Kishinev pogrom
- Shuliavka Republic
