= Jaffa riots =

Jaffa riots may refer to:

- Jaffa riots (May 1921)
- Jaffa riots (April 1936), often described as the start of the 1936–1939 Arab revolt in Palestine
