= Kiev pogrom (1881) =

Anti-Jewish pogrom in Kiev in 1881

The Kiev pogrom of 1881 lasted for three days starting 26 April (7 May), 1881 in the city of Kiev and spread to villages in the surrounding region. Sporadic violence continued until winter. It is considered the worst of the pogroms that swept through south-western Imperial Russia in 1881. Pogroms continued on through the summer, spreading across the territory of modern-day Ukraine including Podolia Governorate, Volyn Governorate, Chernigov Governorate, Yekaterinoslav Governorate, and others.

It has been said that the tsarist authorities made no attempt to stop it. However, professor John D. Klier of modern Jewish History at University College London (who spent almost his entire academic life researching Jewish life in Russian controlled territory) came to the conclusion (in his detailed study Russians, Jews and the Pogroms of 1881–1882) that, far from passively allowing the pogroms to take place, the Tsarist government actively and repeatedly issued orders to the police, and military to suppress them. They also published proclamations forbidding anti-Jewish riots.

The direct trigger for the pogrom in Kiev, as in other places, was the assassination of Tsar Alexander II on 1 March (13 March) 1881, for which the instigators blamed the Russian Jews. Nevertheless, the Southern-Russian Workers' Union substantially contributed to the spread and continuation of violence by printing and mass distributing a leaflet which read:

Brother workers. You are beating the Jews, but indiscriminately. One should not beat the Jew because he is a Jew and prays to God in his own way – indeed, God is one and the same to all – rather, one should beat him because he is robbing the people, he is sucking the blood of the working man.

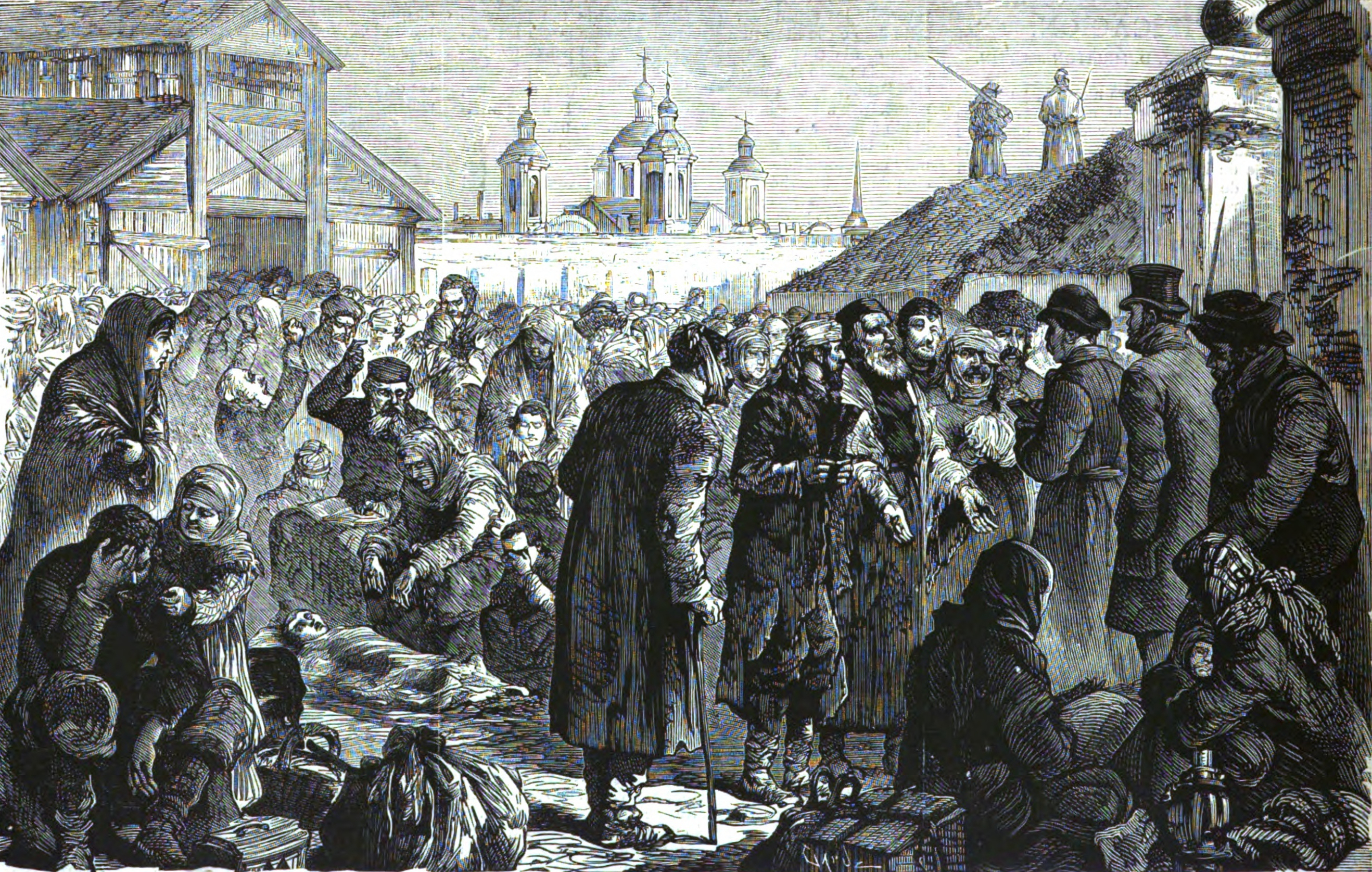
Expulsion of Jews in Kiev (1881)

The extent to which the Russian press was responsible for encouraging perceptions of the assassination as a Jewish act has been disputed. Local economic conditions (such as ancestral debts owed to moneylenders) are thought to have contributed significantly to the rioting, especially with regard to the participation of the business competitors of local Jews and the participation of railroad workers. It has been argued that this was actually more important than rumours of Jewish responsibility for the death of the Tsar. These rumours, however, were clearly of some importance, if only as a trigger, and they drew upon a small kernel of truth: one of the close associates of the assassins, Hesya Helfman, was born into a Jewish home. The fact that the other assassins were all atheists and that the wider Jewish community had nothing to do with the assassination had little impact on the spread of such antisemitic rumours. Nonetheless, the assassination inspired "retaliatory" attacks on Jewish communities. During these pogroms thousands of Jewish homes were destroyed, many families were reduced to poverty, and large numbers of men, women, and children were injured in 166 towns in the southwest provinces of the Empire.

== Notes and references ==
- History of the Jews in Russia and Poland, Volume II, by S. M. Dubnow.
