= Pogroms during the Russian Civil War =

Wave of antisemitic attacks 1918–1920

Pogroms of 1917–1920
- Part of the Russian Civil War
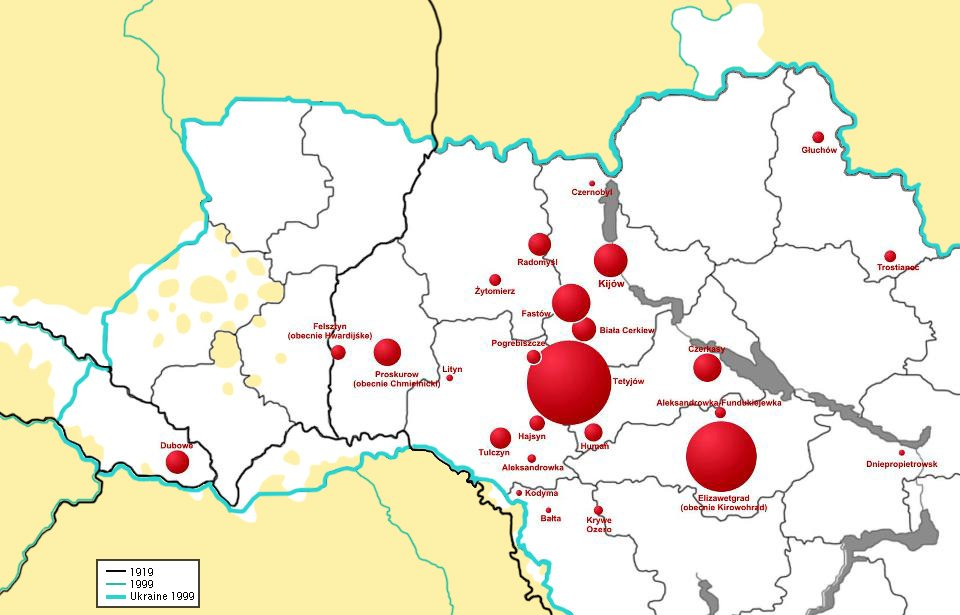
- Location of antisemitic pogroms in Ukraine (1918–1920)
- Location: South Russia, Belorussia and Ukraine
- Date: November 1917 – November 1920
- Attack type: Pogrom, genocide
- Deaths: 35,000–250,000
- Victim: Jews
- Perpetrators: AFSR, White movement (17–50% of killings); Green armies Red Army (2–9% of killings); Ukrainian People's Army (25–54% of killings)
- Motive: Antisemitism; Anti-communism

The pogroms during the Russian Civil War were a wave of mass murders of Jews, primarily in Ukraine, during the Russian Civil War. From 1918 to 1920, there were 1,500 pogroms in over 1,300 localities, in which 35,000-250,000 died. All armed forces operating in Ukraine were involved in the killings, in particular the anti-Communist Ukrainian People's Army and Armed Forces of South Russia. Jewish sources of the time estimated that more than a million people were affected by material losses, 50,000 to 300,000 children were orphaned, and half a million were driven out from or fled their homes.

== Background ==
From 1791, Jews living in the Russian Empire were largely restricted to the Pale of Settlement in the western part of the country. There was also a ban on holding state and public positions. From 1881 to 1884 and 1903 to 1906, many pogroms took place.

During World War I, almost half a million Jews fought in the Imperial Russian Army. However, the command of the Russian army was prejudiced against the Jews. Academy officers were convinced that Jews undermined the power of the tsar, blamed them for not recognizing God in Jesus and stigmatized them as foreigners. During the war, much of the Russian population blamed Jews for causing food shortages and price inflation, or for spreading rumors about the lack of weapons, despite it being one of the most widely known public secrets. The situation was complicated by the establishment of the "German Committee for Freeing of Russian Jews" in Germany, whose founders saw the war with Russia as a method of liberating Russian Jews from the Tsarist autocracy.

During the withdrawal of Russian troops in 1915 from Congress Poland, under pressure from the Central Powers, the military command deported 250,000 Jews deep into Russia. 350,000 more refugees joined this number. Their property was plundered frequently. The newcomers did not receive legal security in their new homes.

The dispersion of the population across the territories of several countries and the division of forces during World War I meant that Jews found themselves on different sides of the front. On each side, they were collectively accused of favoring the enemy, including spying on behalf of the opposing army. Espionage suspects were usually hanged without a trial. According to the historian Peter Kenez, most of the accusations of desertion, after being executed, turned out to be false. A rising atmosphere of antisemitism caused pogroms to break out in Stanyslaviv, Chernivtsi and Tarnopol, during the withdrawal of Russian troops from the region.

After the tsar was overthrown on 2 April 1917, Alexander Kerensky's Provisional Government abolished the Pale of Settlement and repealed the restrictions on national and religious minorities, thereby granting Jews full civil equality in the Russian Republic.

== The first major pogroms (1917–1918) ==
Antisemitic violence increased dramatically during the First World War in 1914. With the start of the Russian Civil War pitting Bolshevik Red Army forces against the anti-Bolshevik White Army forces, large numbers of weapons fell into the hands of irregular armed forces, and both civil authorities and traditional social ties weakened. In this context, Jews became a particular target of attacks. Antisemitic canards, such as a belief in an international Jewish conspiracy or that prominent Jews such as Trotsky, Zinoviev, and Kamenev supported the Red Army, were widely propagated.

Nearly all military or political initiatives against the Bolsheviks in Ukraine adopted antisemitic rhetoric. Historian Peter Kenez has argued that antisemitism was a focal point of the anti-Bolshevik White movement's ideology, reaching a fanaticism during the revolutionary and civil war period comparable to that of the later Nazi movement. Disagreeing, historians Richard Pipes and Orlando Figes have argued that the White's movement antisemitic activity was above all motivated by nationalist sentiment and greed. Historian Oleg Budnitskii has stated that civil war antisemitic activities were inflamed by years of antisemitism in the army during the First World War; acting on the view of Jews as disloyal outsiders, imperial Russian authorities deported hundreds of thousands of Jews from areas near the front line, prompting frequent pogroms against those being deported.

Antisemitism increased further after the 1917 February Revolution, and did not abate after the October Revolution. Between November and December 1917, there were antisemitic pogroms in sixty towns, including Bender, Tiraspol, Kharkiv, Kiev and Vitebsk.

In January 1918, Central Council of Ukraine promulgated a declaration of independence of the Ukrainian People's Republic. Of the territory that would later become part of the Soviet Union, the largest number of Jews lived in Ukraine (1.6 million out of 2.6 million). The General Jewish Labour Bund, which had supported Ukrainian autonomy, this time opposed separation from Russia. Other socialist parties abstained from support for the declaration. The Ukrainian national movement was infuriated by the lack of support for independence.

Already by the middle of the month there were pogroms in Bratslav, combined with looting and arson. On 20 January in Kiev, during the fights between Ukrainian nationalist and Soviet forces, over a hundred Jews were killed and Jewish shops were plundered. Ukrainian nationalists arrested members of the First All Russian Congress of Jewish Fighters, and shot an organizer for the Ukrainian Union of Jewish Fighters, I. Gogol.

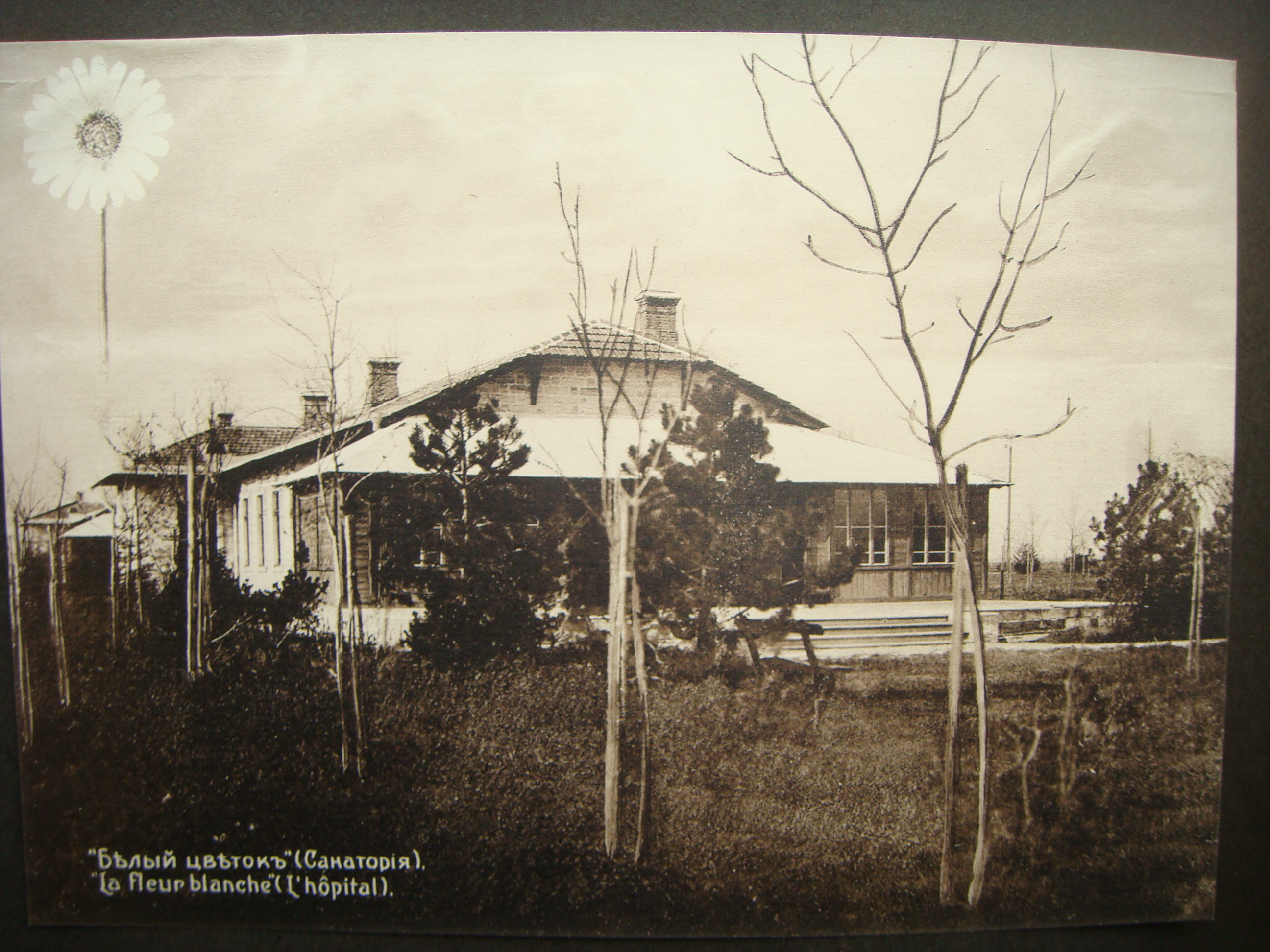
Photo of the "White Flower" sanatorium, which sheltered Jews from antisemitic Red Army soldiers.

In some cases, the communists saw the Jewish community as the bourgeoisie, their class enemies. During its withdrawal from Chernigov Governorate in the spring of 1918, the Red Army, motivated by "fighting against the bourgeoisie", committed pogroms against Jews. Retreating Soviet forces are believed to have been responsible for a brutal 7–8 March pogrom in Chernihiv and Hlukhiv, where about 400 Jewish residents, including many children, were murdered within two days. During the civil war period, Bolsheviks are estimated to have been responsible for 9% of pogroms, White movement forces for 17%, Ukrainian nationalists for 50%, and unaffiliated groups for the remainder.

In April 1918, as a result of a coup d'état in agreement with the Central Powers, the military leader Pavlo Skoropadskyi seized power and established the Ukrainian State. At that time, the authorities issued proclamations that collectively blamed Jews for spreading anti-German sentiment and participating in the black market. In March 1918 in Kiev, during the takeover of the city by the Ukrainian-German forces, haidamaks of the 3rd Haydamatsky Infantry Regiment captured and shot Jews. There were also murders in Kremenchuk and Hoholeve.

In November 1918, the Polish–Ukrainian War broke out. After the Polish Army captured Lviv (then Lwów or Lemberg), 72 Jews were killed by a Polish mob that included Polish soldiers. The report states that in Lviv "disreputable elements [from the Polish Army] plundered to the extent of many millions of crowns the dwellings and stores in the Jewish quarter, and did not hesitate to murder when they met with resistance." Some other events in Poland were later found to have been exaggerated, especially by contemporary newspapers such as the New York Times, although serious abuses against the Jews, including pogroms, continued elsewhere, especially in Ukraine. The result of the concern over the fate of Poland's Jews was a series of explicit clauses in the Versailles Treaty protecting the rights of minorities in Poland. In 1921, Poland's March Constitution gave the Jews the same legal rights as other citizens and guaranteed them religious tolerance.

In total, during the years of 1917 and 1918, there were 90 pogroms, most of which occurred between August and October 1917 and between March and May 1918.

== Ukrainian pogroms (January–July 1919) ==
In November 1918, the Ukrainian Hetmanate was replaced by Directorate of Ukraine, and on 22 January 1919, the re-established Ukrainian People's Republic carried out a unification with the West Ukrainian People's Republic. In February, Symon Petliura became the president of the Directorate. At the same time, starting in January 1919, the Red Army initiated an invasion of Ukraine from the east. In order to internally integrate its own troops, the Directorate used antisemitic agitation. Pogroms were launched on a massive scale in places where Ukrainian nationalists felt threatened. By the summer of 1919, various Ukrainian forces had murdered over 30,000 Jewish civilians.

In mid-January 1919, the troops of Oles Kozyr-Zirka stationed in Ovruch killed 80 inhabitants and plundered approximately 1,200 houses. The otaman blamed the Jews who had gathered in the market square "for Bolshevism" and demanded a large ransom. Despite collecting tribute, the order to stop the pogrom was not obeyed. The events ended only with the withdrawal of the otaman's troops under the pressure of the Bolsheviks. At that time, in Zhytomyr, soldiers, joined by peasants from nearby villages, started a pogrom, killing 80 people and plundering property. Two months later, during the takeover of the city by the Ukrainian People's Army, a rumor was spread among the soldiers that 1,300 Christians had allegedly been murdered by Jews. It was a rumor based on the killing of 22 people by the Bolsheviks, which had actually included Jewish victims. A delegation of city officials managed to convince the commanders that the accusation was false, but it was too late to convince the rank-and-file. Despite the escape of many Jews from the city, during the pogrom that lasted five days, 317 people were murdered and many injured. Many Jews were saved by some of the city's Christian inhabitants, who provided them with shelter. The pogrom ceased with the recapture of the city by Bolshevik troops on 24 March.

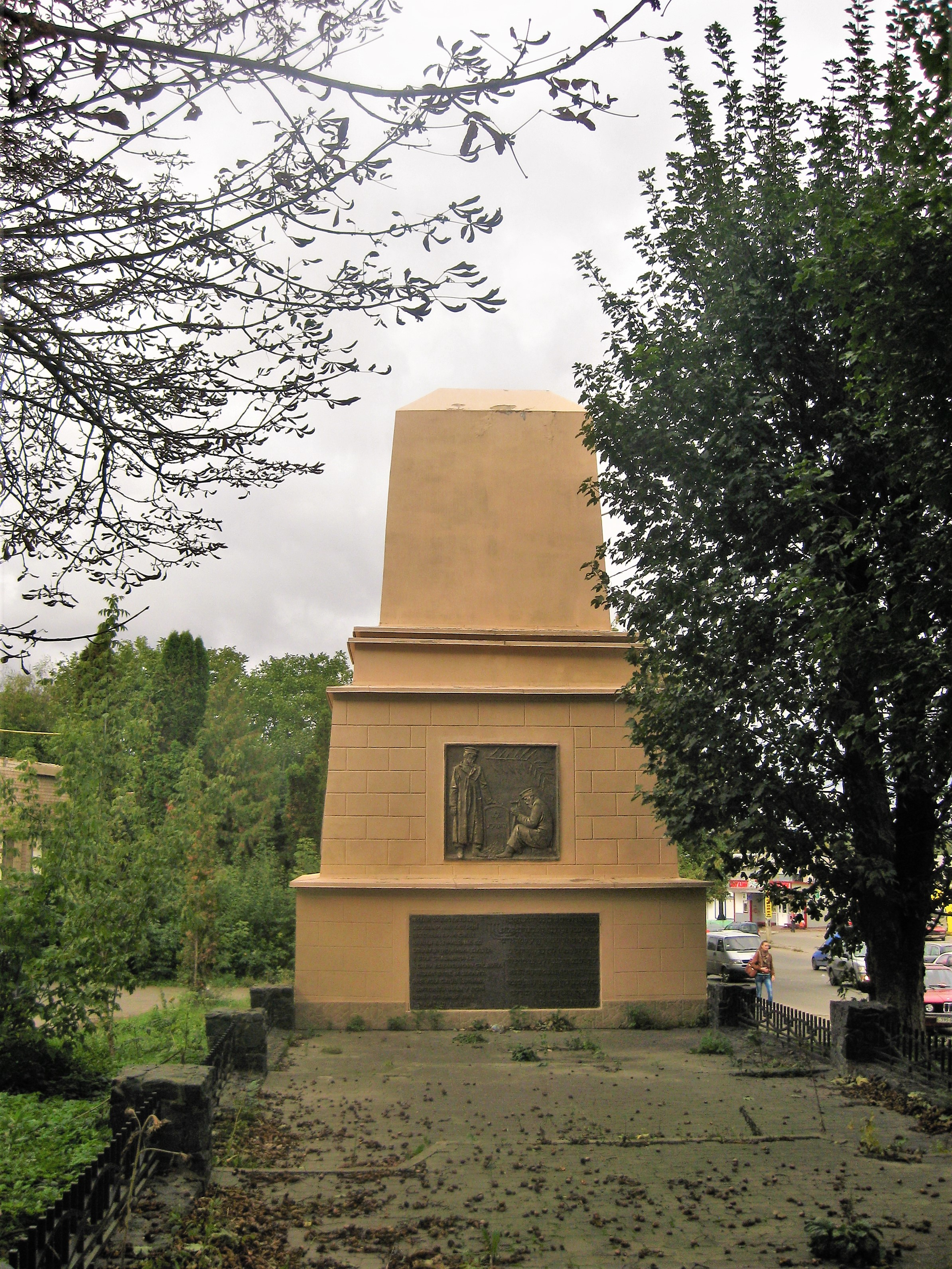
Monument to victims of Proskurov pogrom in Khmelnytskyi.

The February massacres in Proskurov and the adjacent Felsztyn in Podolia province were among the bloodiest acts of antisemitic violence during the war in Ukraine. In Proskuriv, the local Bolsheviks planned an armed uprising on 15 February. Despite the opposition of the Jewish socialist parties and the warnings of the city guard, and without consulting the inhabitants, the Bolsheviks went ahead with their coup attempt. However, they were quickly defeated by the Cossack army. The head of the stationed brigade, Ivan Semesenko, then issued a speech to the soldiers in which he blamed the Jews for the incidents, considering them to be dangerous enemies and ordering their extermination. Cossacks massacred Jews and non-Jews for multiple hours. There is at least one instance of Jews engaging in the pogrom as well. The pogrom was stopped by the intervention of the front commander. However, estimates range from 1,200 to 1,700 people killed, including approximately 300 who succumbed to injuries following the incident. In the following days, the otaman issued a proclamation on antisemitic rhetoric, and only collecting the ransom removed the threat of a resumption of the pogrom. Semesenko was arrested a few months later. It is unclear whether he was released or executed.

Some Bolshevik rebels tried to take over the nearby Felsztyn, but they scattered after hearing about the defeat of the Proskuriv uprising. This episode terrified the Jewish inhabitants of the town. On 17 February, several hundred Cossacks encircled Felsztyn and the next morning they unleashed a massacre. Soldiers killed residents in their homes or after dragging them out into the street, and robbed houses and shops. There were also numerous rapes. According to one eyewitness account, the head of the post office and telegraph office did not react to the incidents, although he was aware of them. As a result of the pogrom that lasted several hours, 600 out of 1,900 Jewish inhabitants of the town were murdered.

Between February and April, there were fights between the Cossacks and the Bolsheviks in the area of Balta. There was a pogrom during each of the Ukrainian takeovers. In total, 100-120 Jewish inhabitants died, and almost all houses and shops were devastated.

Pogroms were often repeated in the same places. Between May 1919 and March 1921 there were 11-14 riots in Bratslav, during which a total of over 200 Jews were killed and 1,200 people lost their homes. In turn, during the pogrom in Chernobyl, which lasted between 7 April and 2 May, 150 Jewish residents were killed by the forces of Ilko Struk and most of their property was destroyed. There were also cases of capturing Jewish passengers on ships. On 7 April, the Dniepr ships "Baron Ginsburg" and "Kozak" were captured by the forces of Viktor Klymenko. About 100 Jews were separated from the rest of the passengers and drowned in the river.

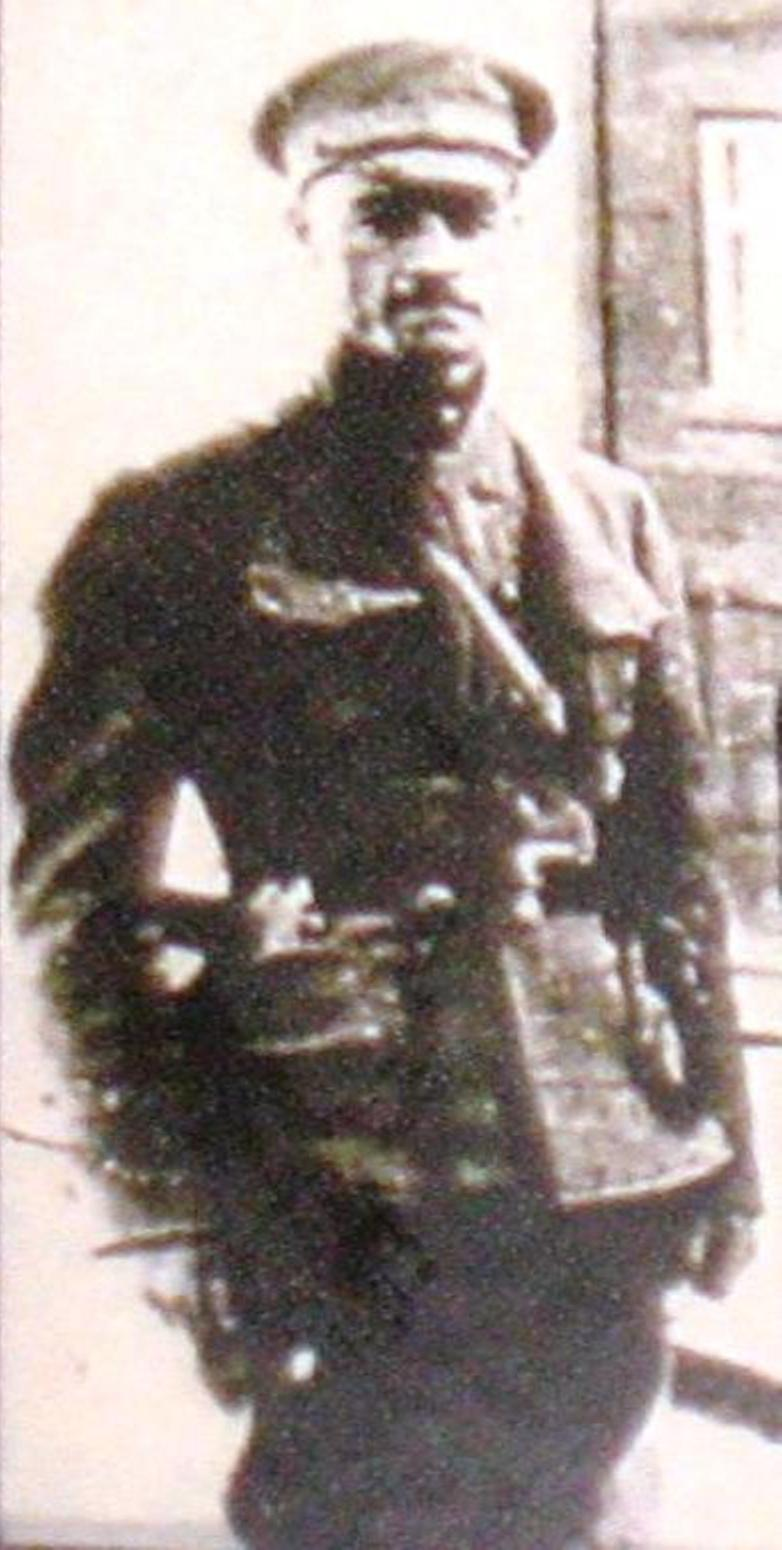
Nykyfor Hryhoriv, the otaman who oversaw antisemitic pogroms in Kherson.

In May, the violence increased. On 10 May, raiders killed 258 people and wounded 150 in the village of Kryve Ozero. The forces of Nykyfor Hryhoriv showed particular cruelty. Initially, they recognized the command of the Red Army and, together with its troops, in March and April 1919 carried out operation to capture Kherson, Nikolayev and Odessa from the Allies. But at the beginning of May, Hryhoriv launched an anti-Bolshevik uprising. He published a "Universal", in which he called for the overthrow of Ukrainian Soviet Republic, which he described as "foreigners from Moscow and the country where Christ was crucified". In a short time, his troops committed a series of massacres.

After the capture of Trostianets on 10 May, the Jewish residents were taken to the police station building. At the same time, at a meeting of the city council, a rumor was spread about the alleged relief of Jewish relief from the vicinity. The angered crowd went to the police station building, which they shot at and threw grenades inside, before killing the wounded. From 342 to over 400 Jews died. At the same time, property was plundered and women were raped. Between 15 and 22 May, a pogrom took place in Oleksandrivka, as a result of the unleashed antisemitic agitation. Hryhoriv's troops, together with a part of the local population, killed over 210 inhabitants there. Famine and epidemic typhus flared up in the village soon after.

The bloodiest pogrom of that period took place in Yelysavethrad, which on 10 May was taken over by Hryhoriv's troops. His "Universal" was distributed in the streets and agitation was initiated. On 15 May, the soldiers started a pogrom. In a typical case, a group of several soldiers, after invading a house, murdered its inhabitants and plundered valuable property. Then the house was taken over by a crowd that plundered the rest of the property, loading it onto carts. In the three-day slaughter, between 1,300 and 3,000 people died, despite many cases of Christians hiding their Jewish neighbors. Almost all of the 50,000 Jewish inhabitants of Yelysavethrad were pushed into poverty. Hospitals were overcrowded with the wounded and famine broke out. Red soldiers were sent to recapture Yelysavethrad, only for them to join in the pogrom. The pogrom in Cherkasy had a similar course, where on 15 May, Hryhoriv's troops started plundering Jewish houses and killing their inhabitants. Soon some of the townspeople joined the attackers. Despite some Christians hiding their Jewish neighbors, 700 people died in the five-day pogrom.

Other pogroms committed in May by Hryhoriv's troops include the massacres in Katerynoslav (150 deaths), in Kodyma (120 deaths) and Oleksandrivka-Fundukliyivka (over 160 deaths).

People in New York protesting against the violent pogroms

Caption Reads: Thousands of Jews marched in the great New York Parade to a mass meeting of protest against recent pogroms in Ukraine, where, speakers said, 120,000 Jews have been massacred. In the parade a service flag was carried with 8,000 stars for Jews killed in service of the United States.

-2 December 1919; Daily Ardmoreite (Oklahoma Paper)

In Uman, 35,000 out of the city's 60,000 inhabitants were Jews. In Tsarist times, however, administrative positions were occupied by Christians. The arrival of Soviet rule in March 1919 made some Jews join the authorities. This change caused the Jews to be collectively blamed for the Soviet policy of food requisitioning. On 10 May, an anti-Bolshevik uprising broke out and soon Hryhoriv's troops took over the city. They carried out searches of homes, claiming to be looking for "communists". But in fact, random Jews were murdered, and the non-Jewish communists were not disturbed. During the 10-day pogrom, 300-400 people died. Some of the Christian residents hid their Jewish neighbors. Ukrainian peasants also refused to sell food to Jews. The pogrom was finally ended by the intervention of the 7th Soviet Regiment, but three days later the Regiment was ordered to move to a different location, and Uman would be under the control of the 8th Ukrainian Soviet Regiment. The 8th regiment committed another pogrom after assuming power. 150 Jews were killed by the Reds over the next six weeks. On 3 July the 8th regiment was replaced by the 1st Ukrainian Soviet Cavalry of Fedor Gribenko, which committed another pogrom of similar scale. Two days after, the International 4th Regiment, which was made not only of Ukrainians, Russians, and Jews, but also foreign volunteers from China, Hungary, and Germany, came in control of the city. The arrival of this regiment marked the end of the pogroms in Uman.

The situation was somewhat similar in the multiethnic Lityn. The advent of the Soviet power opened up the possibility for Jews to join the government, which some took advantage of. Initially, there were no ethnic disputes among the residents. However, when the troops of Yakiv Shepel took over the city on 14 May, they initiated a pogrom in which 100-120 people were murdered. It was also noted that peasants refused to sell food to Jews.

On 12 May, the troops of Ananiy Volnets captured Haisyn. 340-350 of the town's Jewish inhabitants died in the pogrom they committed. The violence was stopped thanks to the appeal of Russian intellectuals. In turn, in Radomyshl, peasant units of Dmytro Sokolovskiy initiated a series of pogroms in which 400 to 1,000 were killed.

The most serious pogrom committed by Ukrainian forces in July was the Tulchyn massacre. On 14 July, the attackers killed 519 of the town's Jewish inhabitants. On the other hand, the capture of Holoskiv by the troops of otaman Kozakov cost the lives of 95 Jews, and most of the settlement was devastated. At the end of the month, Uman was encircled again. On 29 July, a group of haydamaks captured the city and started a pogrom, killing 150 people.

On 15 July, the Seventeenth of Tammuz in the Hebrew calendar, locals turned on their Jewish neighbours in Slovechno, modern-day Zhytomyr Oblast after being told false rumours that Jews were planning to attack Gentiles, convert churches into synagogues, and force Gentiles by pressure into Judaism. More than 60 Jewish civilians were killed as an ensuing pogrom broke out and 45 to 100 injured.

There was a Jewish self-defense unit in Pohrebyshche. However, when the forces of Danylo Terpylo captured the town on 18 August, the Jewish resistance collapsed. Armed groups stormed Pohrebyshche and killed 350-400 of its Jewish inhabitants within a few hours. In the same month, in the town of Justingrad-Sokolivka, Terpylo's forces kidnapped 150 Jews, demanding the release of a high ransom. The requested amount could not be collected and almost all hostages were murdered.

== White pogroms (September - December 1919) ==
Many Jews opposed collectivization and pinned their hopes on the advancing White movement. Experienced with Ukrainian pogroms, they were willing to give up their autonomy in favor of a livable life and a return to the rule of law.

In September 1919, Cossack units of the Volunteer Army captured Fastov. Between 23 and 26 September, they carried out a massacre, during which 1,300-1,800 Jewish people died. Many families were burned alive in their own homes. Children and those hiding in synagogues were also killed. There were also gang rapes and looting. The military authorities ordered the pogrom to be stopped, but the Jewish quarter of the city was ruined.

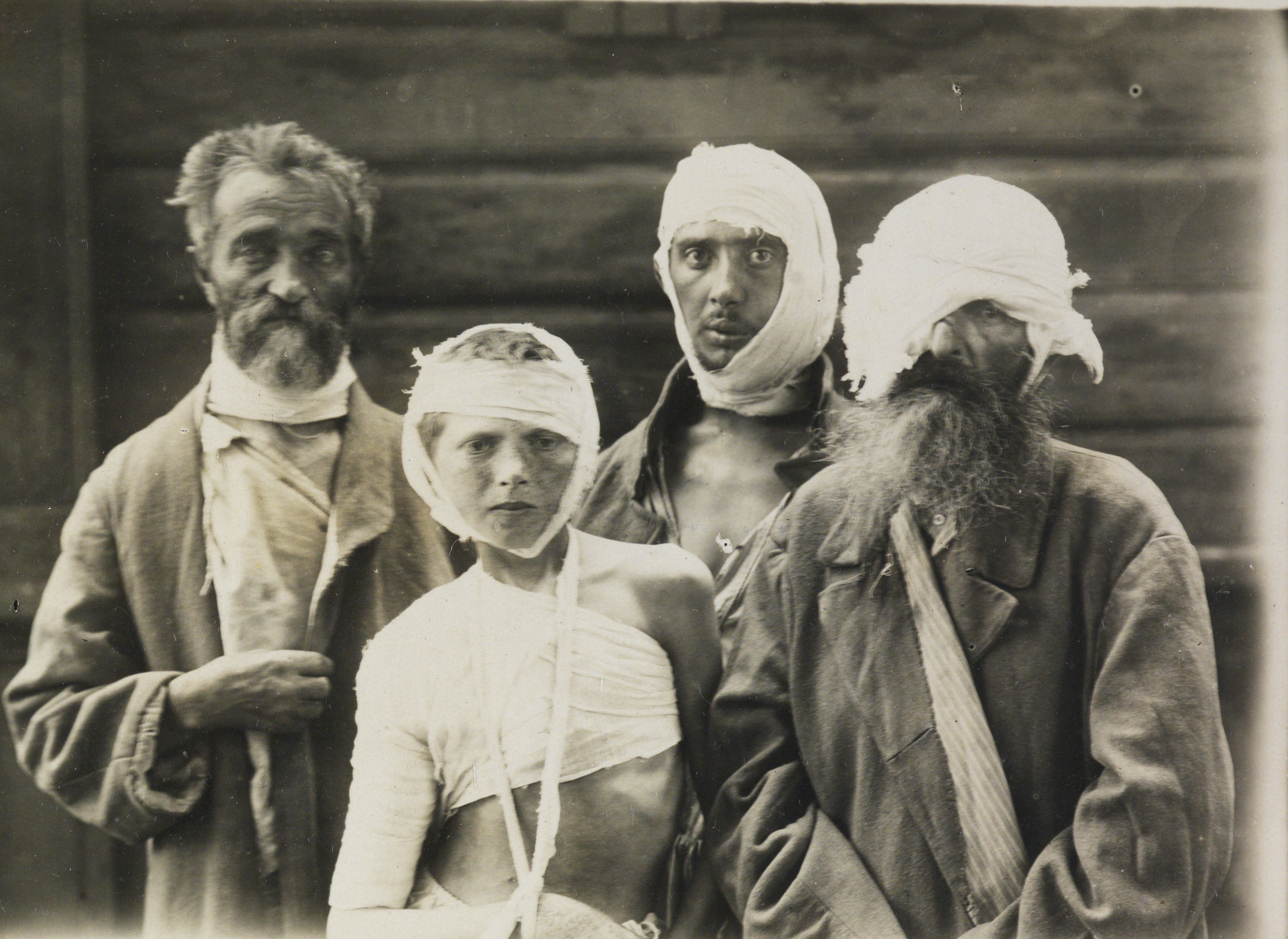
Victims of a pogrom perpetrated by Ukrainian forces in Khodorkiv, 1919

Three weeks later, the forces of the Volunteer Army pushed the Bolsheviks out of Kiev. After the army entered the city on 16 October, a pogrom broke out. The attackers broke into houses, plundered property and murdered Jewish people. At the height of the riots, the newspapers of the Black Hundreds published an article accusing Jews of shooting at soldiers during the takeover of the city, listing their personal details. The commission set up to investigate these allegations soon found that they had been fabricated. In the five-day wave of violence, 500-600 people were killed.

Some towns experienced pogroms from several sides. Bila Tserkva was such a city, where Jews were the target of violence, successively by the Ukrainian People's Army, then by Terpylo's forces, and finally by Cossack troops in the White Army. The total number of victims of pogroms in Bila Tserkva between 1919 and 1920 is given at 300-850 people.

== Later pogroms (1920) ==
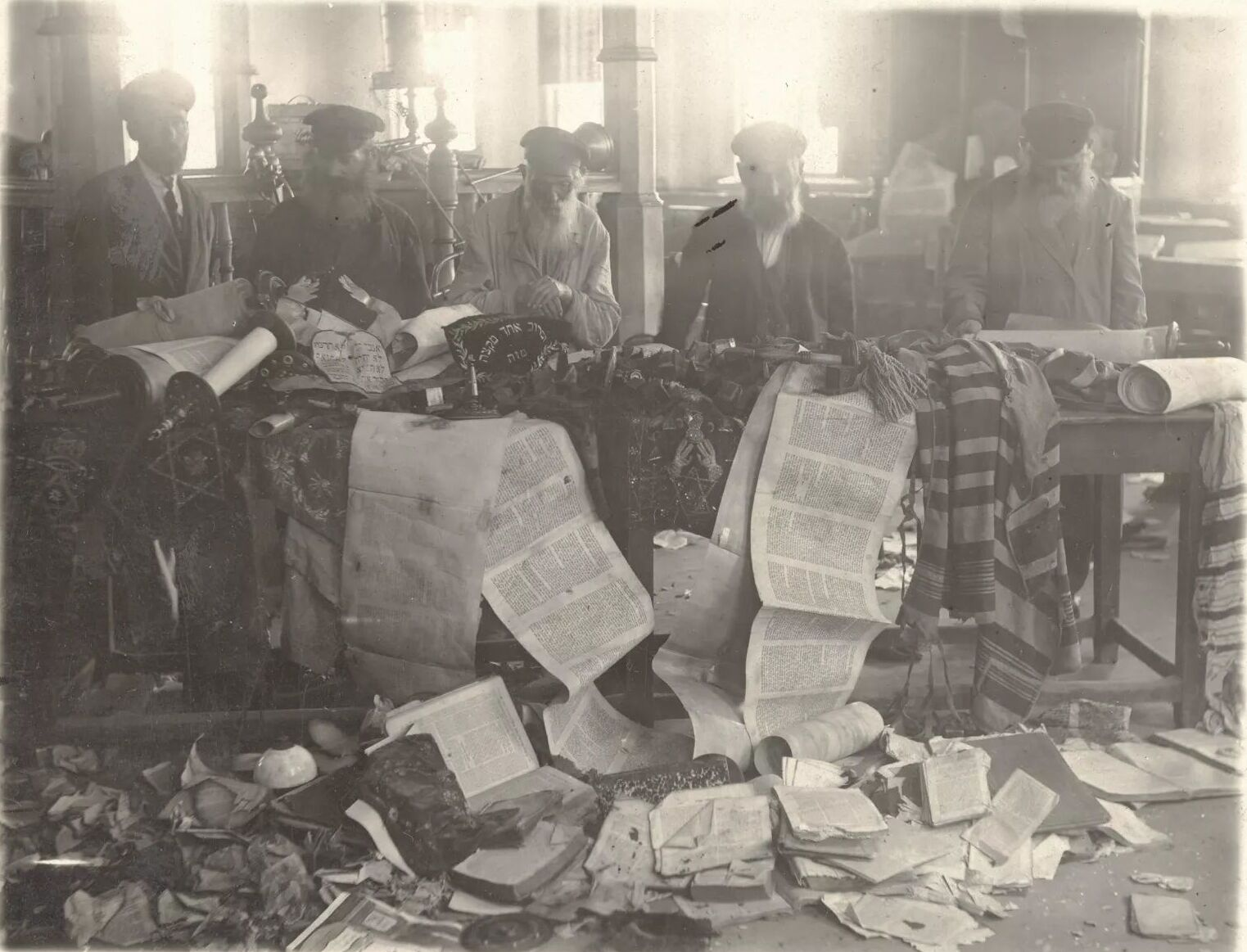
Damaged Torah scrolls after pogrom in Kiev, 1920

The greatest escalation of anti-Jewish violence took place in Tetiyev in the spring of 1920. Following a pogrom by the Whites the previous year, the town became a site of another massacre, this time perpetrated by Ukrainian anti-Bolshevik insurgents. On 26 March 1920, Cossack troops scattered around the city and began killing Jewish residents. The synagogue complex, where about 1,500 people were hiding in the attic, was set on fire. Most of them were asphyxiated by smoke, and those who escaped through the windows were killed. Some local peasants participated in the pogrom, killing Jews or handing them over to their attackers and loading the stolen property onto carts. Out of the 7,000 Jewish inhabitants of Tetiyev, 4,000-5,000 died, and almost the entire town was ruined.

== Balance and aftermath ==
=== Number of pogroms ===
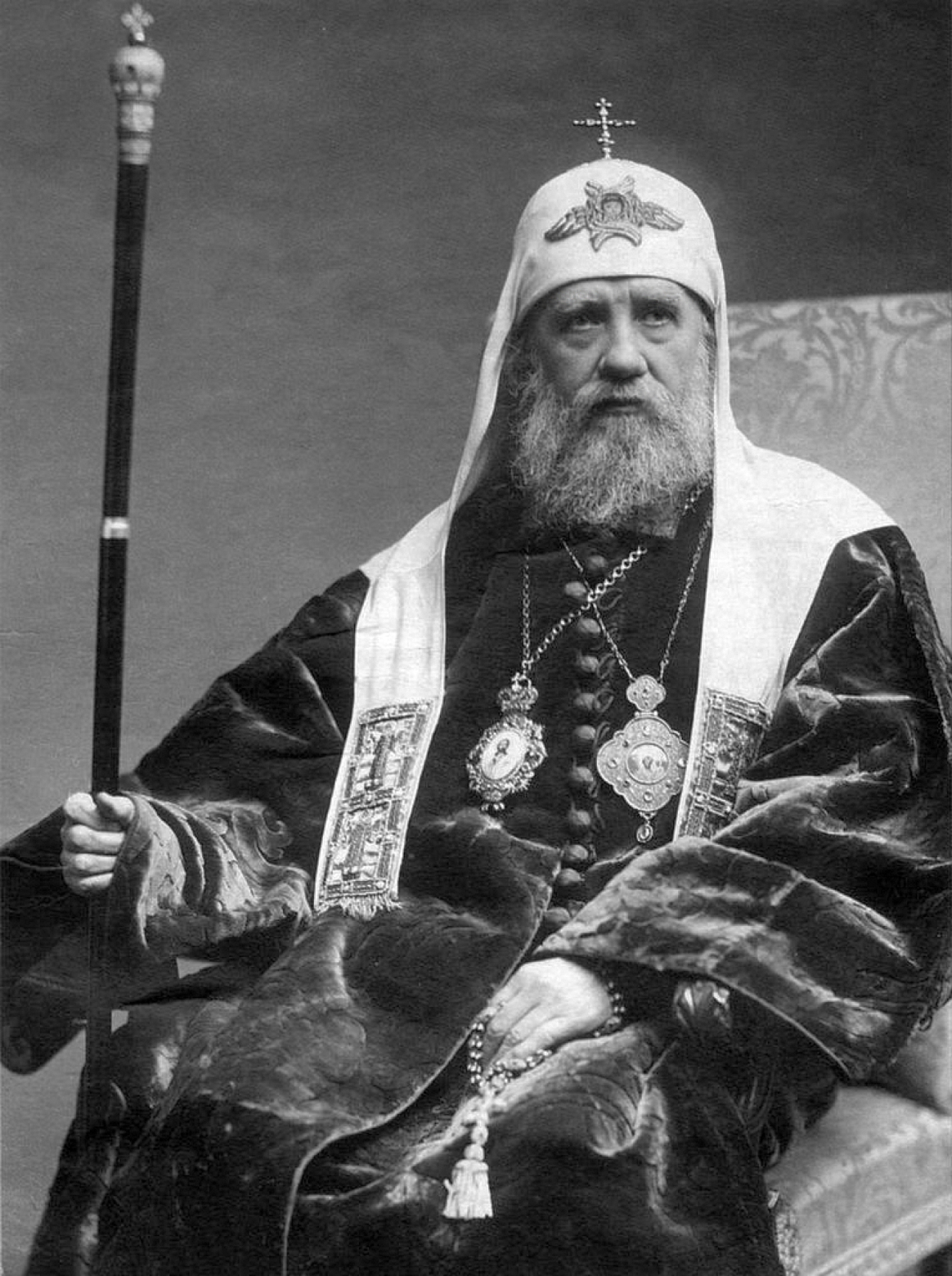
Patriarch Tikhon of Moscow, head of the Russian Orthodox Church, who condemned the pogroms by the White movement.

The Armed Forces of South Russia displayed entrenched antisemitic prejudices and they had already stood against the equal rights of minorities established in 1917. In their view, the Jews were responsible for the fall of Tsarism and supported Bolshevism as a whole, and the Protocols of the Elders of Zion were widely distributed among the White forces. The South Russian propaganda agency, under the command of Konstantin Nikolaevich Sokolov, spread rumors about Jews shooting from the windows of buildings at retreating soldiers and about alleged Jewish regiments. The antisemitism of the Whites was supported by a significant part of the clergy of the Russian Orthodox Church, who saw Jews as a godless people who wanted to take power over the "Holy Rus". However, Patriarch Tikhon of Moscow unequivocally condemned the pogroms. In a pastoral letter of 21 July 1919, he wrote that rapes of Jews were "a disgrace to their perpetrators, a disgrace to the Holy Church."

White Cossack units, especially Terek Cossacks, had the greatest share in the massacres at the hands of the Volunteer Army. Pogroms were carried out mainly for the purpose of plunder and under the influence of collectively blaming the Jews for their failure in battle.

The Volunteer Army controlled the Ukrainian lands between the summer of 1919 and the spring of 1920. After almost every seizure of a city by White troops, there was a pogrom against its Jewish inhabitants. The violence particularly intensified in the autumn and winter, during the retreat of the White Army.

According to estimates by historian J.L. Dekel-Chena, in the years 1917–1918 there were 90 pogroms. Researcher Oleg Budnitskii reports that between 1918 and 1920 there were a total of 1,500 pogroms in Ukraine, in over 1,300 localities. In turn, according to Milton Kleg, in 1919 alone, the number of pogroms in Ukraine was 1,326.

=== Estimates of the number of victims and their geographical distribution ===
Pogroms with more than 100 victims
Date	Location	Number of victims
1918
7 March	Hlukhiv	400
1919
February – April	Balta	100–120
15 February	Proskuriv	1500–1600+
18 February	Skelivka	600
22–26 March	Zhytomyr	317
February–May	Chernobyl	150
May	Katerynoslav	150
May	Radomyshl	400–1000
10 May	Kryve Ozero	258
10–11 May	Trostianets	342–400+
12 May	Haisyn	340
12–14 May	Uman	300–400
14 May	Lityn	120
15–22 May	Oleksandrivka	211
15–17 May	Yelysavethrad	1300–3000
18 May	Kodyma	120
18–20 May	Oleksandrivka-Fundukliyivka	160+
16–20 May	Cherkasy	700
17 April	Dubove	300–800
11 July	Tulchyn	519
11 August	Yelysavethrad	1,000
August	Cherkasy	250
22 August	Pohrebyshche	350–400
23–26 September	Fastov	1300–1800
16–20 October	Kiev	500–600
1919-1920	Bila Tserkva	300–850
1920
26 March	Tetiyev	4000–5000

According to Peter Kenez, the pogroms of Jewish civilians in Ukraine in 1918–1920 were the largest case of mass murder against Jews before the Holocaust. It was the first time in the history of modern Europe that uniformed armed forces murdered civilians on such a massive scale.

According to various sources, between 35,000 and 250,000 people died. The number of 50-60 thousand victims is given as the lower bound. Eli Heifetz, chairman of the All-Ukrainian Committee for Aid to Victims of the Pogrom, in 1921, on the basis of the data available to him, estimated the number of deaths at 120,000. The same conclusions were reached in 1999 by David Vital. Ronald Suny reports a lower bound average at 50,000 deaths, though reports a range of 35,000 to 150,000 total. According to Manus Midlarsky and Yitzhak Arad's 2005 and 2009 estimates, the death toll was 150,000. These estimates included those who died as a result of wounds, as well as victims of hunger and epidemics of infectious diseases following pogroms. Lidia Miliakova wrote that 125,000 Jews were killed in Ukraine and 25,000 in Belorussia. Oleg Budnitskii in his monograph mentions 200,000 victims as an upper estimate. In turn, according to Peter Kenez, the death toll amounted to a quarter of a million people. The 1985 Whitaker Report of the United Nations cites an estimated range of 100,000 to 250,000 deaths.

According to Lidia Miliakova the majority (78%) of pogroms occurred in Ukraine, while 14% and 8% happened in Belorussia and Russia respectively.

=== Estimates of other losses ===
Based on the partial reports of the Red Cross, Eli Heifetz estimated that more than one million people suffered material losses. About 50,000-300,000 children were left orphans and half a million inhabitants were driven out of their homes or left. According to Z. Gitelman, in the years 1918–1921, 70–80% of the Jewish population was without regular income, although the Soviet ban on private trade was a partial cause of unemployment.

=== Estimates of the contribution of the forces carrying out the pogroms ===
Anglo-Jewish writer Israel Zangwill wrote that:

It is as Bolsheviks that the Jews of South Russia have been massacred by the armies of Petlyura, though the armies of Sokolow have massacred them as partisans of Petlyura, the armies of Makhno as bourgeois capitalists, the armies of Hryhoriv as Communists, and the armies of Denikin at once as Bolsheviks, capitalists and Ukrainian nationalists.

Manus Midlarsky and Oleg Budnitskii reported that, according to earlier estimates, the Ukrainian People's Army caused 54% of the casualties, the White Army caused 17%, and the Red Army caused 2%. According to recent analyses carried out after the opening of the Russian archives, the percentage of homicides at the hands of the White Volunteer Army may even reach 50%. The YIVO Encyclopedia of Jews in Eastern Europe said that remaining pogroms (25%) were committed by independent groups, followed by the White Army at 17%, and the Soviets at 9%. YIVO also gives an estimate of 38 people killed in the average pogrom by Ukrainian forces, 25 in the average White pogrom, and 7 in the average Red pogrom.

The involvement in the pogroms of the anarchist Revolutionary Insurgent Army of Ukraine movement, led by Nestor Makhno, is still unclear. The Makhnovists themselves confirmed their complicity in one pogrom by anarchists that killed 22 Jews in Gorkaya, for which the culprits were arrested, convicted, and executed.

== See also ==
- Antisemitism in Russia
- Beat the Jews - save Russia!
- History of the Jews in Russia
- Pogroms in the Russian Empire
- The Cossack riots of 1648 in Ukraine, in which 40–50,000 Jews were primarily killed by the Cossack forces of Bohdan Khmelnytsky.
- Antisemitism in Ukraine
- History of the Jews in Ukraine
- Pogroms in Belorussia during the Russian Civil War

== Bibliography ==
- Adams, Arthur (1963). Bolsheviks in the Ukraine. The Second Campaign, 1918-1919. New Haven: Yale University Press. OCLC 406299.
- Arad, Y. (2009). The Holocaust in the Soviet Union. Jad Waszem. pp. 13–14. ISBN 9780803222700.
- Budnitskii, Oleg (2012). Russian Jews Between the Reds and the Whites, 1917-1920. University of Pennsylvania Press. pp. 216–273. ISBN 978-0-8122-4364-2.
- Davies, N. (1993). "Ethnic Diversity in Twentieth Century Poland". In Strauss, H.A. (ed.). Hostages of Modernization: Austria, Hungary, Poland, Russia. Walter de Gruyter & Co. p. 1012. ISBN 9783110137156.
- Dekel-Chen, Jonathan L. (2010). Anti-Jewish Violence: Rethinking the Pogrom in East European History. Indiana University Press. pp. 82–87. ISBN 978-0253004789.
- Gartner, L.P. (2001). History of the Jews in Modern Times. Oxford University Press. p. xxii. ISBN 978-0-19-289259-1.
- Gitelman, Z.Y. (2001) [1988]. A Century of Ambivalence: The Jews of Russia and the Soviet Union. Indiana University Press. pp. 59–87. ISBN 0253214181.
- Hagen, W.W. (2005). "The Moral Economy of Popular Violence". In Blobaum, R. (ed.). Antisemitism And Its Opponents in Modern Poland. Cornell University Press. pp. 124–148. ISBN 0-8014-4347-4.
- Heifetz, E. (1921). The slaughter of the Jews in the Ukraine In 1919. Thomas Seltzer, Inc.
- Kenez, Peter (1977). Civil War in South Russia, 1919-1920: The Defeat of the Whites. University of California Press. pp. 166–177. ISBN 0-520-03346-9.
- Kenez, Peter (2004) [1992]. "Pogroms and White ideology in the Russian Civil War". In Klier, J.D.; Lambroza, S. (eds.). Pogroms: Anti-Jewish violence in modern Russian history. Cambridge University Press. pp. 291–313. ISBN 0-521-40532-7.
- Kleg, Milton (2001). Hate, Prejudice and Racism. State University of New York Press. p. 4. ISBN 9780791415351.
- Klier, J.D. (2005). "Russian Civil War". In Levy, R.S. (ed.). Antisemitism: A Historical Encyclopedia Of Prejudice And Persecution. ABC-Clio. p. 636. ISBN 1-85109-439-3.
- Klier, J.D. (2010). "Pogroms". The YIVO encyclopedia of Jews in Eastern Europe.
- McGeever, Brendan (2019). The Bolshevik Response to Antisemitism in the Russian Revolution. Cambridge University Press.
- Midlarsky, M.I. (2005). The Killing Trap: Genocide in the Twentieth Century. Cambridge University Press. pp. 44–51. ISBN 0-521-81545-2.
- Pipes, Richard (2011). Russia Under the Bolshevik Regime. Knopf Doubleday Publishing Group. ISBN 978-0-307-78861-0.
- Prusin, A.V. (2005). Nationalizing a Borderland: War, Ethnicity, and Anti-Jewish Violence in East Galicia, 1914-1920. University of Alabama Press. p. 103. ISBN 9780817314590.
- Slutsky, Yehuda; Spector, Shmuel (2007a). "Belaya Tserkov". In Skolnik, Fred; Berenbaum, Michael (eds.). Encyclopaedia Judaica. Vol. 3 (2nd ed.). Macmillan. pp. 278–279. ISBN 978-0-02-865931-2 – via Jewish Virtual Library.
- Slutsky, Yehuda; Spector, Shmuel (2007b). "Bratslav". In Skolnik, Fred; Berenbaum, Michael (eds.). Encyclopaedia Judaica. Vol. 4 (2nd ed.). Macmillan. p. 134. ISBN 978-0-02-865931-2 – via Jewish Virtual Library.
- Slutsky, Yehuda; Spector, Shmuel (2007c). "Cherkasy". In Skolnik, Fred; Berenbaum, Michael (eds.). Encyclopaedia Judaica. Vol. 4 (2nd ed.). Macmillan. pp. 594–595. ISBN 978-0-02-865932-9. Archived from the original on 11 November 2013 – via Jewish Virtual Library.
- Slutsky, Yehuda; Spector, Shmuel (2007d). "Chernobyl". In Skolnik, Fred; Berenbaum, Michael (eds.). Encyclopaedia Judaica. Vol. 4 (2nd ed.). Macmillan. p. 597. ISBN 978-0-02-865932-9. Archived from the original on 17 July 2011 – via Jewish Virtual Library.
- Slutsky, Yehuda; Spector, Shmuel (2007e). "Dnepropetrovsk". In Skolnik, Fred; Berenbaum, Michael (eds.). Encyclopaedia Judaica. Vol. 5 (2nd ed.). Macmillan. pp. 724–725. ISBN 978-0-02-865933-6 – via Jewish Virtual Library.
- Slutsky, Yehuda; Spector, Shmuel (2007f). "Kirovohrad". In Skolnik, Fred; Berenbaum, Michael (eds.). Encyclopaedia Judaica. Vol. 12 (2nd ed.). Macmillan. pp. 187–188. ISBN 978-0-02-865940-4 – via Jewish Virtual Library.
- Slutsky, Yehuda; Spector, Shmuel (2007g). "Podolia". In Skolnik, Fred; Berenbaum, Michael (eds.). Encyclopaedia Judaica. Vol. 16 (2nd ed.). Macmillan. pp. 252–253. ISBN 978-0-02-865944-2 – via Jewish Virtual Library.
- Slutsky, Yehuda; Spector, Shmuel (2007h). "Radomyshl". In Skolnik, Fred; Berenbaum, Michael (eds.). Encyclopaedia Judaica. Vol. 17 (2nd ed.). Macmillan. p. 58. ISBN 978-0-02-865945-9 – via Jewish Virtual Library.
- Slutsky, Yehuda; Spector, Shmuel (2007i). "Russia". In Skolnik, Fred; Berenbaum, Michael (eds.). Encyclopaedia Judaica. Vol. 17 (2nd ed.). Macmillan. pp. 531–587. ISBN 978-0-02-865945-9 – via Jewish Virtual Library.
- Slutsky, Yehuda; Spector, Shmuel (2007j). "Zhytomyr". In Skolnik, Fred; Berenbaum, Michael (eds.). Encyclopaedia Judaica. Vol. 21 (2nd ed.). Macmillan. p. 524. ISBN 978-0-02-865949-7. Archived from the original on 3 October 2015 – via Jewish Virtual Library.
- Slutsky, Yehuda; Spector, Shmuel (2007k). "Uman". In Skolnik, Fred; Berenbaum, Michael (eds.). Encyclopaedia Judaica. Vol. 20 (2nd ed.). Macmillan. pp. 244–245. ISBN 978-0-02-865948-0 – via Jewish Virtual Library.
- Spector, Shmuel; Wigoder, G. (2001). The Encyclopedia of Jewish Life Before and During the Holocaust. New York University Press. p. 1340. ISBN 0-8147-9378-9.
- Tcherikower, Elia (1965). The Pogroms in Ukraine in 1919.
- Veidlinger, Jeffrey (2021). In the Midst of Civilized Europe: The Pogroms of 1918-1921 and the Onset of the Holocaust. Pan Macmillan. ISBN 978-1509867448.
- Vital, D. (1999). A People Apart: The Jews in Europe, 1789-1939. Oxford University Press. pp. 715–727. ISBN 0-19-8219806.
- Federation, Ukrainian Jews (1921). The Ukraine Terror and the Jewish Peril. The Federation of Ukrainian Jews.
- Miliakova, Lidia (2010). Le livre des pogroms : antichambre d'un génocide Ukraine, Russie, Biélorussie, 1917-1922 (in French). Calmann-Lévy.
