= Fastov massacre =

1919 mass murder of Jews

- Part of pogroms during the Russian Civil War
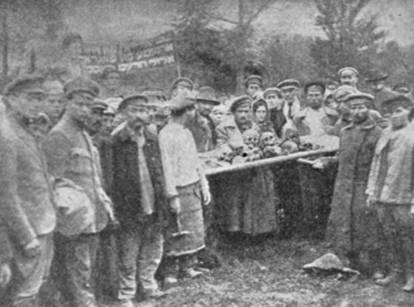
- Victims of the Cossack massacre in 1919
- Location: Fastov
- Date: September 1919
- Deaths: 1,000-1,500 according to modern historians, Emma Goldman said she had been told that 4000 to 5000 died and 7000 of the survivors died on the road to Kiev
- Victim: Jewish civilians of the town
- Perpetrator: Cossack units of the Volunteer Army

The Fastov massacre was a pogrom against the Jewish population of the Ukrainian city of Fastov (now Fastiv) in September 1919 by units of the White Army.

== Events ==
The massacre took place from September 23–26 as White troops from the Volunteer Army, primarily Terek Cossacks, entered the town under the lead of the Colonel V.F. Belogortsev went door to door, killing Jews. Historians Oleg Budnitskii wrote that Cossacks would ask Jews for money and tortured those who could not provide. The dismembered bodies of Jews "were given to the dogs and swine." Witnesses reported that the majority of victims were killed as they were lined up against the synagogue's walls, and the killers engaged in heavy looting of Jewish properties and the mass rape of women and girls.

Soldiers regularly mistreated Jewish civilians for fun, including one case where a boy was forced to hang his own father, and in other scenarios forced escapees to walk back into their burning homes. Over 200 Jewish homes were destroyed and many Jewish shops and community institutions were also targeted.

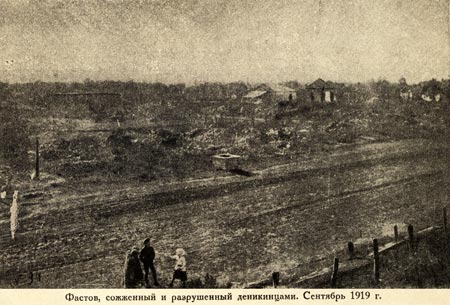
The ruins of the town after it was sacked by the Volunteer Army

Lithuanian-American Jewish anarchist Emma Goldman recalled that when she arrived at the town the locals told her of "fearful pogroms... the most terrible of them by Denikin... 4,000 persons were killed while several thousand died as a result of the wounds and shock. Seven thousand perished from hunger and exposure on the road to Kiev... The greater part of the city had been destroyed or burned; many of the older Jews were trapped in the synagogue and there murdered, while others had been driven to the public square where they were slaughtered."

English journalist Anna Reid estimated that 1,500 Jews died in the massacre, while Nicolas Werth gives a broader range of 1,000-1,500. Budnitskii narrows the death toll down to 1,300-1,500 out of a population of 10,000 Jews.

== See also ==
- Pogroms of the Russian Civil War
- Tetiyev pogroms

== Bibliography ==
- Reid, Anna (2015). Borderland: A Journey Through the History of Ukraine. Basic Books.
- Budnitskii, Oleg (2012). Russian Jews Between the Reds and the Whites, 1917-1920. University of Pennsylvania Press. ISBN 978-0-8122-0814-6.
