= Budnitsky =

Budnitsky or Budnitskii (Russian: Будницкий), feminine: Budnitskaya is a Russian surname. Polish version: Budnicki, Ukrainian: Budnitskyi. Notable persons with the surname include:

- Alla Budnitskaya, Soviet and Russian actress
- Oleg Budnitskii, Soviet and Russian historian
