= Ovruch Ridge =

Ridge in Ukraine

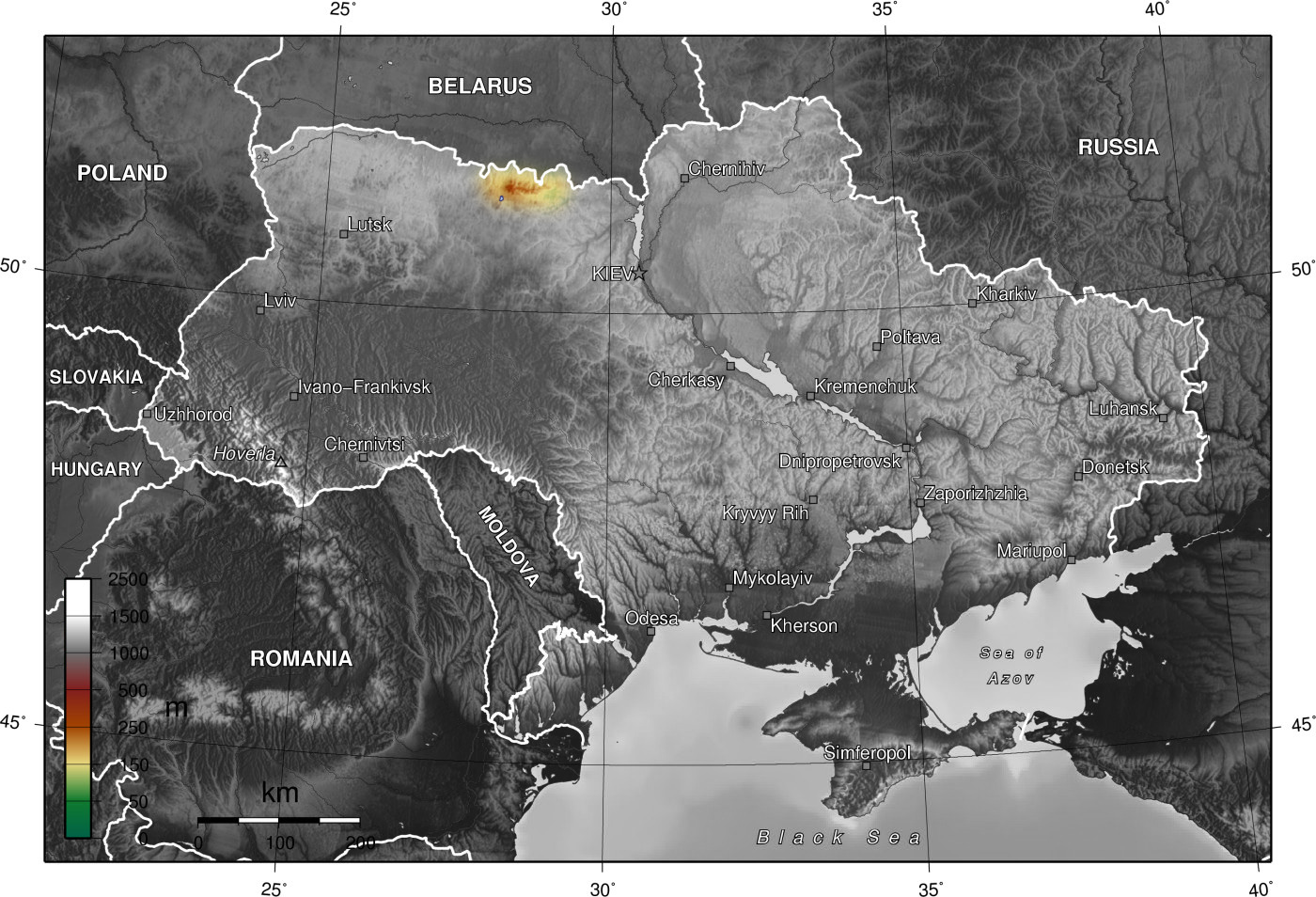
Location of Ovruch Ridge in Ukraine

Ovruch Ridge (Ukrainian: Овруцький кряж) or Slovechno-Ovruch Ridge (Словечансько-Овруцький кряж) is an upland in the central part of Polesia in the northern part of Ukraine's Zhytomyr Oblast. It has a length of around 50 kilometers and width of 5-12 kilometers, spanning from the city of Ovruch to the upper flow of Bolotnytsia, a tributary of Ubort river. The absolute heights of the ridge range between 185 and 316 meters, meanwhile its relative height comprises 80 meters.

The ridge consists mainly of Proterozoic quartzes, shales and sandstones, covered with loamy soils and, in some areas, loess. It is dissected by deep ravines. Around one-quarter of the ridge is covered with pine and mixed pine-oak forests.

== Gallery ==
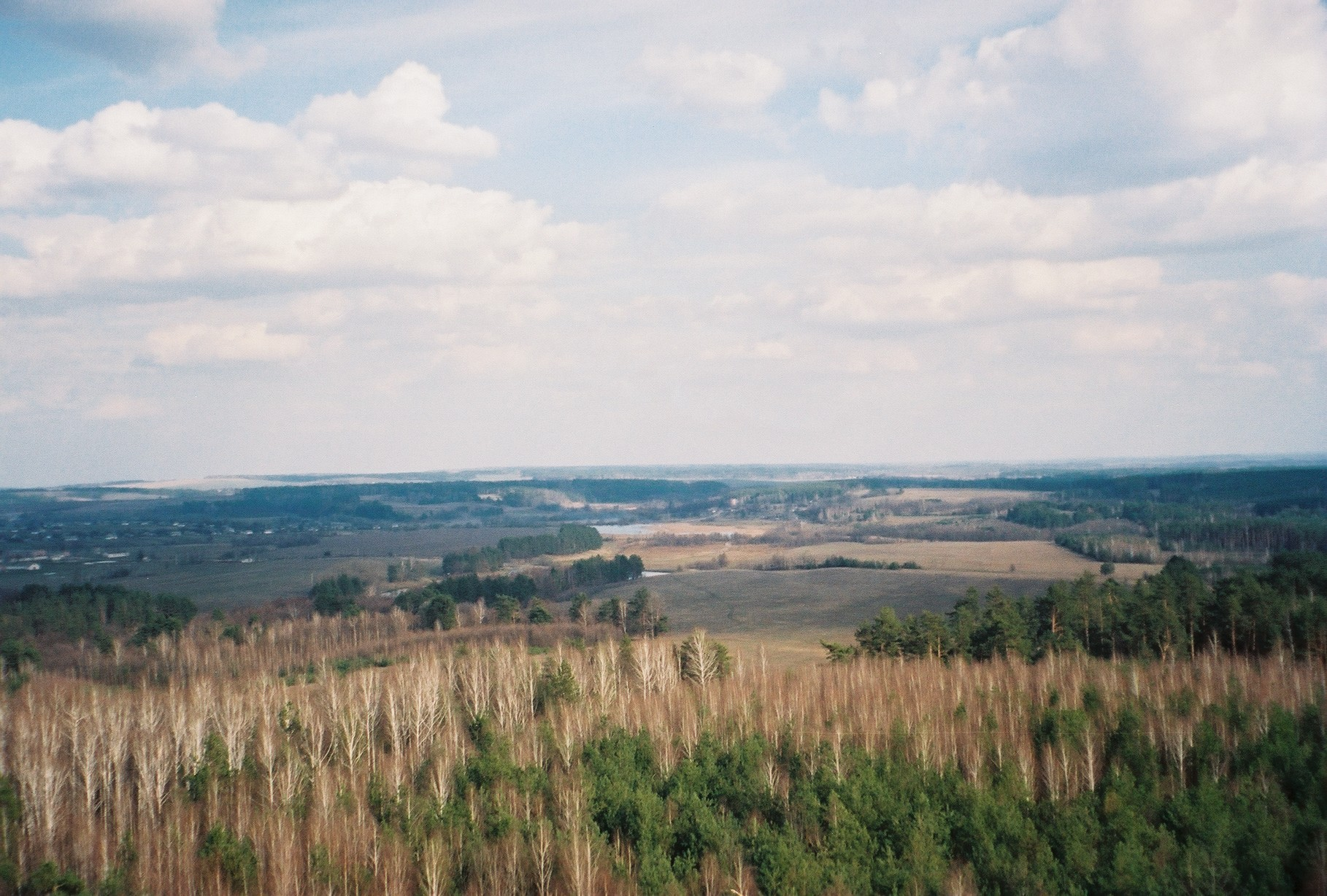
View of the ridge near the village of Lystvyn

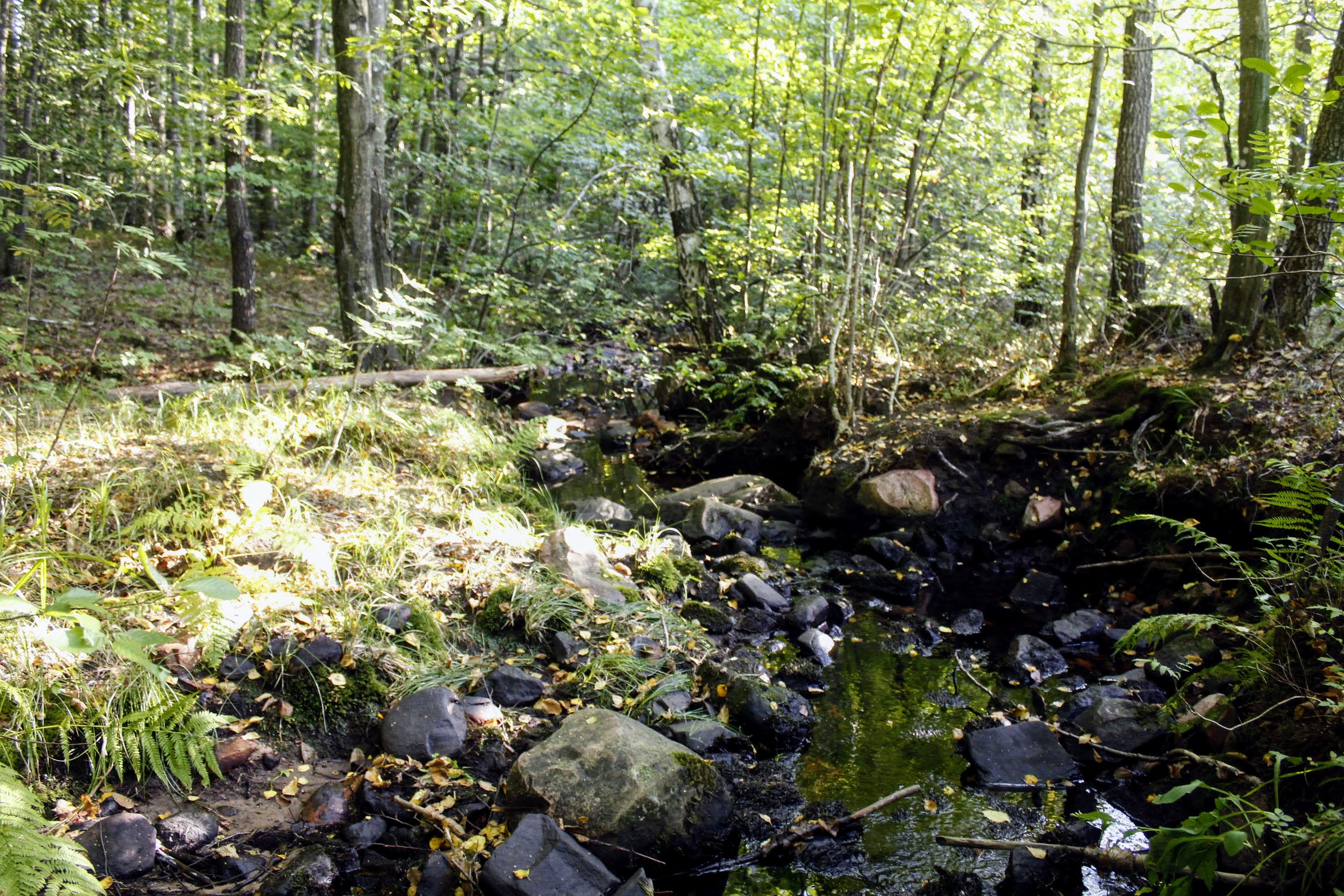
A forest stream on the ridge

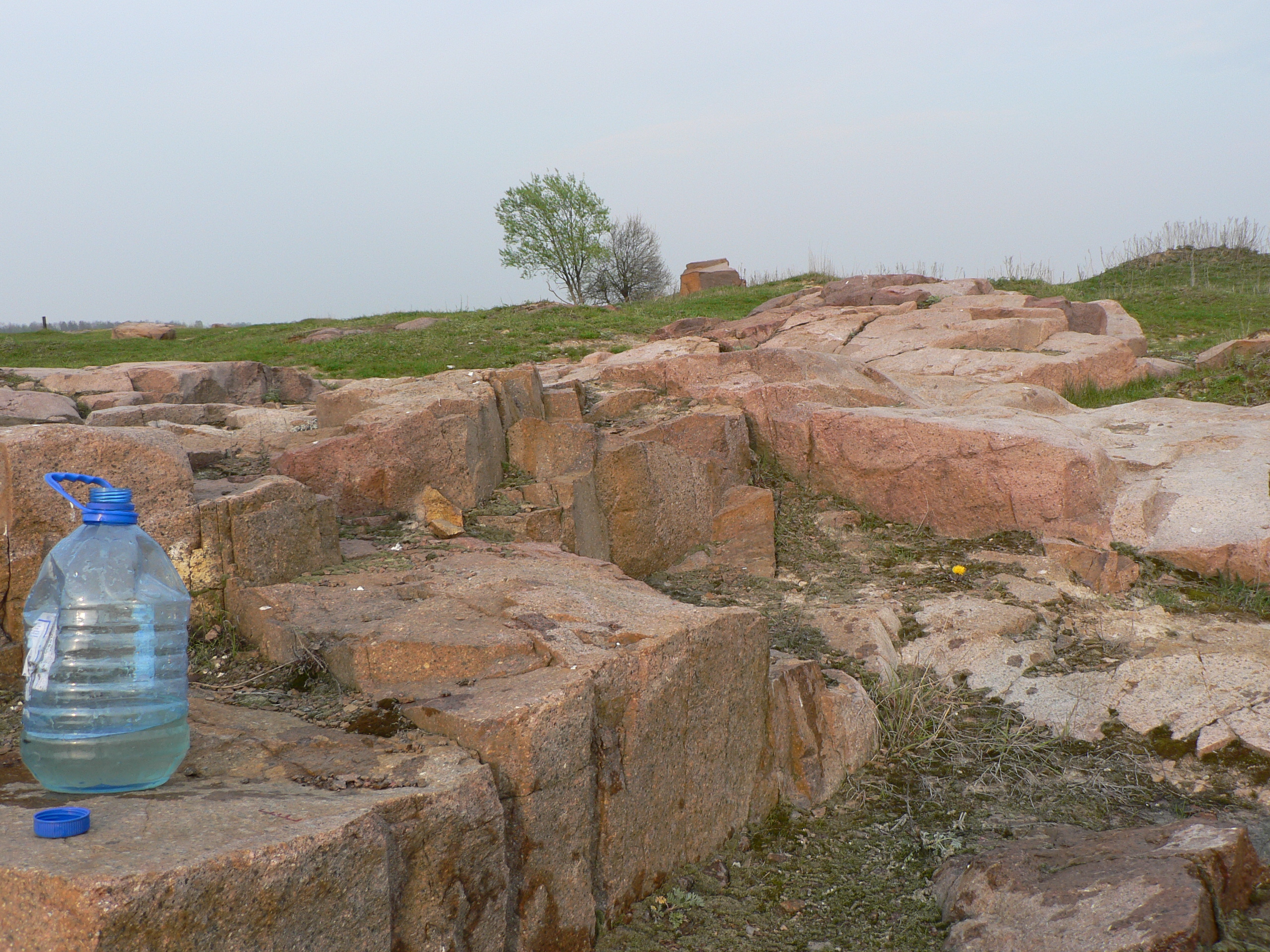
Quartz rocks near the village of Krasylivka

== Source ==
- Ovruch Ridge in Encyclopedia of Ukraine
