= Slovechno =

Village in Zhytomyr Oblast, Ukraine

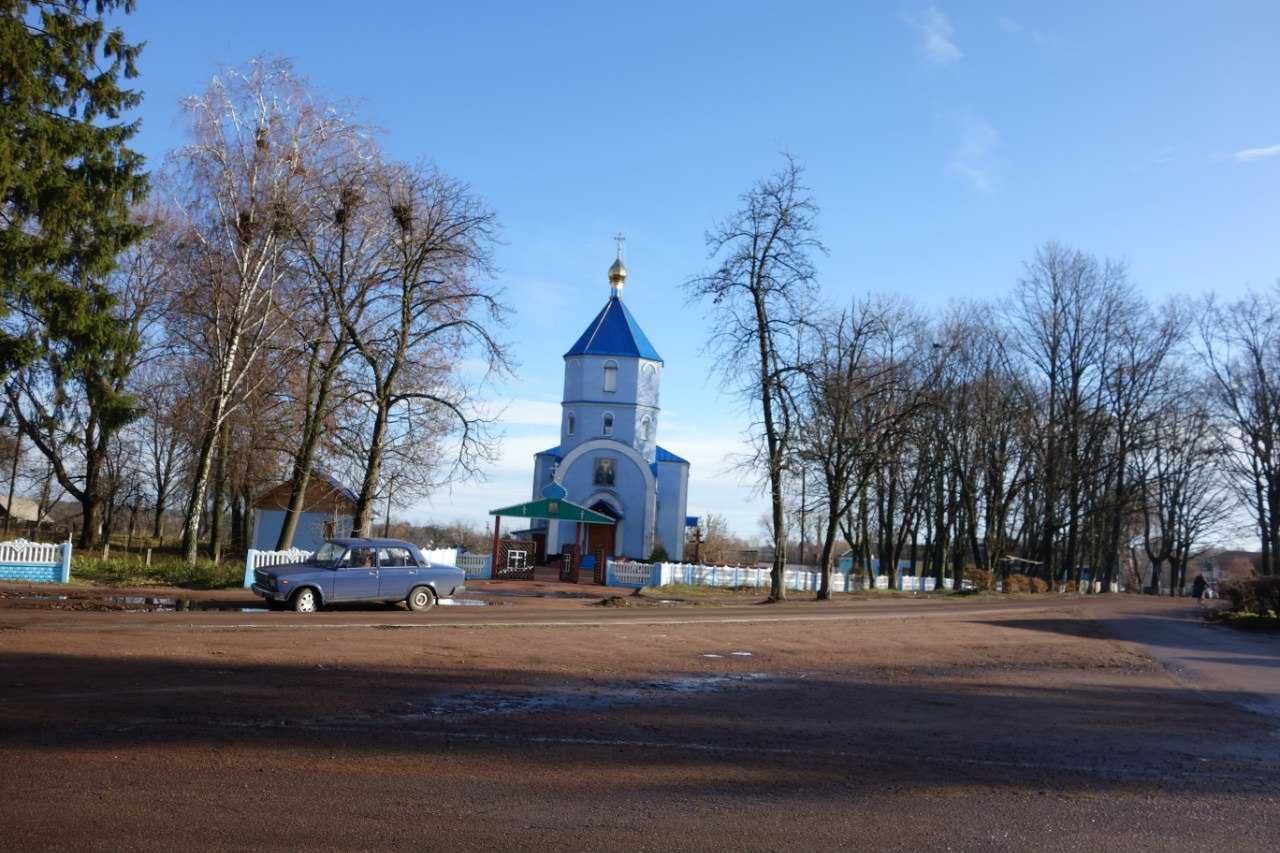

- Location within Zhytomyr Oblast Location within Ukraine
- Coordinates: 51°22′52″N 28°21′16″E
- Country: Ukraine
- Oblast: Zhytomyr
- Raion: Korosten
- Hromada: Slovechno

Population
  - Total: 1,725

Slovechno (Ukrainian: Словечне, Polish: Słoweczne, Russian: Словечно), also called Slovechne, is a village in the Korosten Raion of Zhytomyr Oblast, Ukraine. It is 33 kilometres (21 miles) from Ovruch. Placed next to the Slovechna river, it is the capital of the hromada of the same name.

== History ==
=== Pogrom of 1919 ===
There was once a large Hasidic Jewish community in the town, dating back to the 18th century. The Jewish cemetery which contains 101–500 tombstones was built in 1832. The village centre was mostly populated by Jews, and on the further-out parts of Slovechno the ethnic composition was more mixed. Both Jews and Gentiles lived in peace with each other. During the Russian Civil War, a local strongman and World War I veteran named Kosenko ordered a pogrom against the Jews of Slovechno, telling the Gentiles of the town that Jews were planning to take over the community. Kosenko spread false rumours that the Jews planned take churches and turn them into synagogues, ban Gentile marriages, and pressure Gentiles. The pogrom finally broke out on the Seventeenth of Tammuz of 5679, in the Gregorian calendar Tuesday 15 July 1919. The violence erupted at 2:30 am, according to a witness who said he heard someone yell at "Nachinai!" (meaning "Begin!") at the pogromists. Crowds of villagers beat, shot and stabbed Jews, including the women, children, and elderly. The police chief Marko Lukhtan, who had himself taken part in the planning of the pogrom, turned away requests for protection. At least 60 (by some accounts 68) Jews were murdered over the next two days and at least 45 to a hundred wounded. According to the Babi Yar Holocaust Memorial Center the death toll was 72.

=== World War II ===
In the Second World War many Jews, all residents of Slovechno, were killed and buried in a mass grave at this town. The old Jewish cemetery in the town was vandalized.

=== 2020 road tragedy ===
On 6 August 2020 a car crash on the Ovruch-Slovechno highway killed three adults and a 9-month-old infant near the nearby village of Skrebelyichi.

=== 2021 drowning ===
On 28 July 2021 a 14-year-old boy drowned after he went swimming in the village's lake.

== Notable residents ==
- Itsik Kipnis, Jewish writer
- Tsfanya-Gedalya Kipnis, Ukrainian-Israeli painter

== See also ==
- Ovruch Ridge
