= Oleg Budnitskii =

Soviet and Russian historian

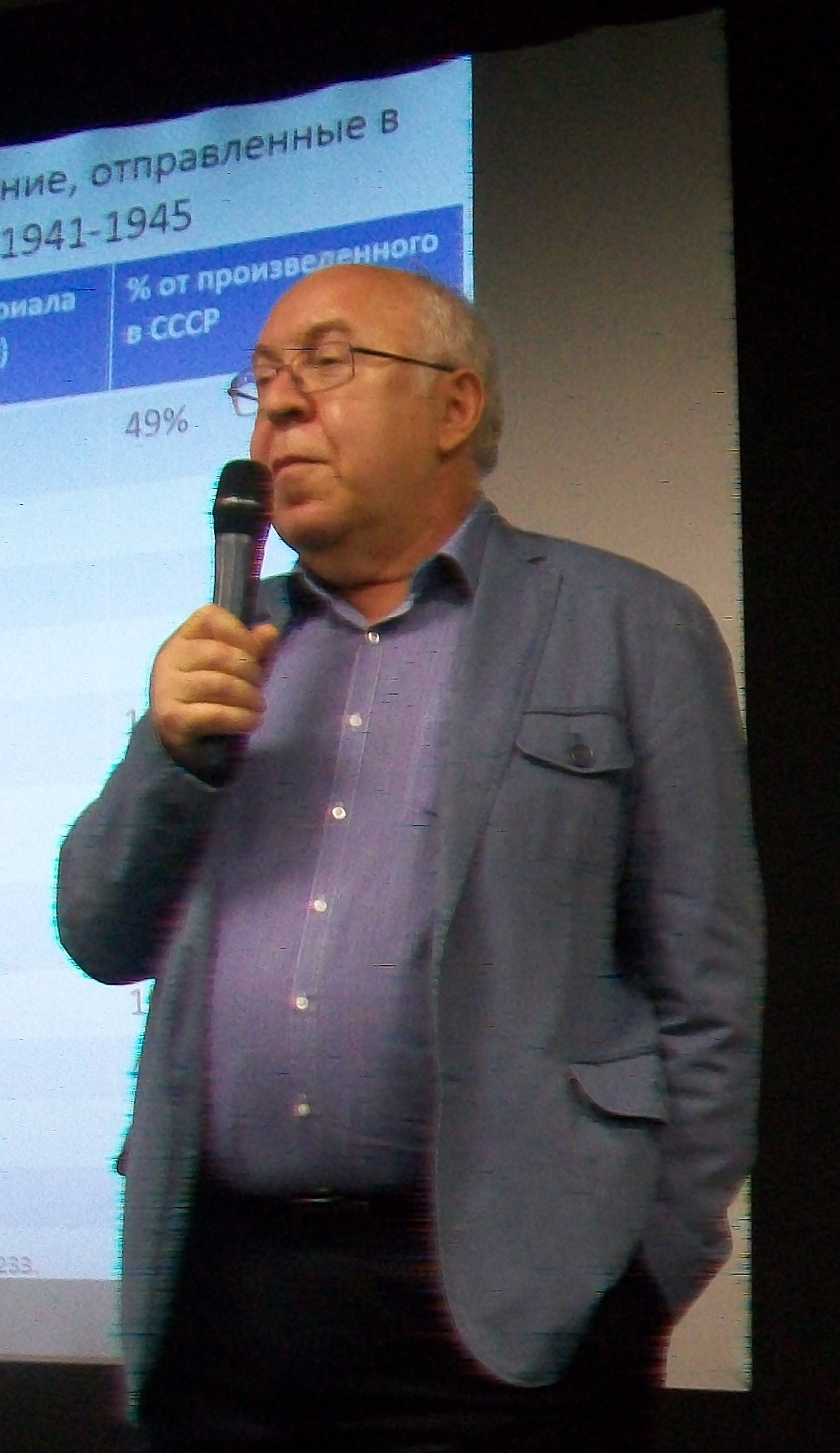
Oleg Budnitskii

Oleg Budnitskii, also Oleg Budnitsky (Russian: Олег Витальевич Будницкий, romanized: Oleg Vitalyevich Budnitsky) is a Soviet and Russian historian specializing in Russian history of the 19th and 20th centuries, specifically, social history of World War II, history of the Russian Revolution and the Russian Civil War, history of terrorism, history of Russian emigration, and history of Russian Jewry.

== Monographs ==
- Терроризм в российском освободительном движении: идеология, этика, психология (вторая половина XIX — начало XX в.). Moscow, ROSSPEN, 2000
  - 2nd edition, expanded Moscow, ROSSPEN, 2016.
- Российские евреи между красными и белыми (1917—1920). Moscow, ROSSPEN, 2005.
- Деньги русской эмиграции: Колчаковское золото. 1918—1957. Moscow, Новое литературное обозрение, 2008.
- Русско-еврейский Берлин (1920—1941). Moscow, Новое литературное обозрение, 2013. (with А. Л. Полян)
- Терроризм в Российской империи: краткий курс. Непрошедшее прошлое. История России. Moscow: Эксмо: Бомбора. 2021. p. 272. ISBN 978-5-04-115860-6.
- Люди на войне. Что такое Россия. Moscow: Новое литературное обозрение. 2021. p. 400. ISBN 978-5-4448-1534-2.
- Другая Россия. Исследования по истории русской эмиграции. Moscow, Новое литературное обозрение, 2021. — 632 pp. — (Historia Rossica). ISBN 978-5-4448-1585-4
- Золото Колчака. Moscow, Новое литературное обозрение, 2022. — 456 pp. ISBN 978-5-4448-1744-5
- Евреи в Российской империи. 1772—1917. Краткий курс. — 2025. — 360 pp. ISBN 978-5-4448-2607-2

== Awards ==
- 2016: Yegor Gaidar Prize, by the Yegor Gaidar Foundation, "for contribution to the development of historical studies in Russia"
- 2018: Fiddler on the Roof Award in the Education category, "for popularizing the study of Jewish history in Russia"
